= Mount Alma, Queensland =

Mount Alma
- Suburb
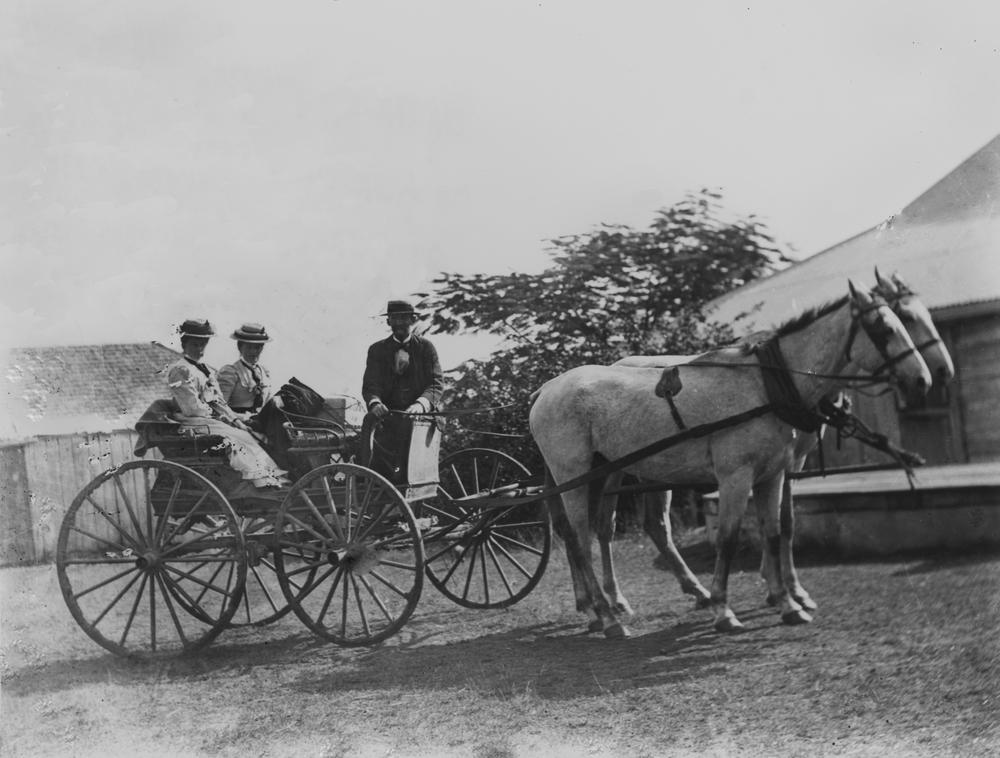
- People in a four wheel carriage, Mount Alma Station, 1890s

- Interactive map of Mount Alma
- Coordinates: 24.0905°S 150.8755°E
- Country: Australia
- State: Queensland
- LGA: Gladstone Region
- Location: 42.7 km (26.5 mi) W of Calliope; 55.4 km (34.4 mi) NW of Biloela; 66.7 km (41.4 mi) S of Gladstone; 123 km (76 mi) S of Rockhampton; 549 km (341 mi) NNW of Brisbane

Government
  - State electorate: Callide
  - Federal division: Flynn

Area
  - Total: 813.5 km^{2} (314.1 sq mi)

Population
  - Total: 59 (2021 census)
  - Density: 0.0725/km^{2} (0.1878/sq mi)
- Time zone: UTC+10:00 (AEST)
- Postcode: 4680
Suburbs around Mount Alma
Ulogie	Raglan; Bracewell	East End
Dumgree	Mount Alma	Wooderson
Dumgree	Tablelands	Diglum

Mount Alma is a rural locality in the Gladstone Region, Queensland, Australia. In the 2021 census, Mount Alma had a population of 59 people.

== Geography ==
The locality is bounded by the Mount Alma Range to the north, the Calliope Range to the west and south-west, and the Boyne Range to the south-east.

The Calliope River rises in the north-west of the locality (23.96086°S 150.69654°E) flowing south-east towards the centre of the locality and then flows north-east to exit the locality to the east (Wooderson).

Upper Calliope is a neighbourhood within the north-east of the locality (24.0333°S 150.9666°E).

Mount Alma has the following mountains:

- Cedric Mountain (23.9490°S 150.7133°E) 699 metres (2,293 ft)
- Fig Tree Hill (24.0376°S 150.7182°E) 830 metres (2,720 ft)
- Mount Grim (24.0221°S 150.8209°E) 229 metres (751 ft)
- Mount Harper (24.0085°S 150.8871°E) 238 metres (781 ft)
- Mount Redshirt (24.0849°S 150.7316°E) 597 metres (1,959 ft)
- Round Mountain (24.1227°S 150.7257°E) 487 metres (1,598 ft)
- The Mole Hill (24.1221°S 150.7476°E) 207 metres (679 ft)

The Dawson Highway enters the locality from the east (Wooderson) and exits to the south-west (Dumgree).

The Moura railway line also enters the locality from the east (Wooderson) and exits to the south-west (Dumgree) with the locality being served by:

- Clarke railway station (24.0652°S 150.9127°E)
- Fry railway station (24.0880°S 150.8216°E)

In the south of the locality are two protected areas:

- Maxwelton State Forest, 1,697 hectares (4,190 acres) at 24.2145°S 150.8600°E
- northern section of Kroombit Tops National Park at 24.2467°S 150.9118°E

Apart from the protected areas, the predominant land use is grazing on native vegetation with a small area of production forestry in the south-west of the locality.

== History ==
Calliope Station Provisional School opened in March 1912 as a half time school in conjunction with Mount Redshirt Provisional School (meaning they shared a teacher). In 1917 it became a full time provisional school. On 1 August 1922 it became Calliope Station State School. It closed on 8 July 1956. It was at 44 Galloway Plains Road (24.0306°S 150.9624°E).

== Demographics ==
In the 2016 census, Mount Alma had a population of 47 people.

In the 2021 census, Mount Alma had a population of 59 people.

== Economy ==
There are a number of homesteads in the locality:

- Bocoolima (24.1783°S 150.9156°E)
- Colenso (24.0466°S 150.7684°E)
- Galloway Plains (24.1204°S 150.9688°E)
- Mount Alma (24.0236°S 150.8712°E)
- Rockfield (24.1162°S 150.8080°E)
- Upper Calliope (24.0251°S 150.9677°E)
- Wyalla (24.1229°S 150.7571°E)

== Education ==
There are no schools in Mount Alma. The nearest government primary schools are Mount Larcom State School in Mount Larcom to the north, Calliope State School in Calliope to the east, and Mount Murchison State School in Mount Murchison to the south-west. The nearest government secondary schools are Calliope State High School in Calliope to the east, Gladstone State High School (to Year 12) in South Gladstone to the north-east, and Biloela State High School (to Year 12) in Biloela to the south-west. There are some parts of Mount Alma too distant from these schools; distance education or boarding school are the alternatives.
