= Pimelea mollis =

Conservation status
- Least Concern (NCA)

Scientific classification
- Kingdom: Plantae
- Clade: Tracheophytes
- Clade: Angiosperms
- Clade: Eudicots
- Clade: Rosids
- Order: Malvales
- Family: Thymelaeaceae
- Genus: Pimelea
- Species: P. mollis

Binomial name
- Pimelea mollis A.R.Bean

Species of shrub

Pimelea mollis is a species of flowering plant in the family Thymelaeaceae and is endemic to southern Queensland. It is a shrub with hairy young stems, elliptic leaves and heads of 24 to 45 white, tube-shaped flowers.

== Description ==
Pimelea mollis is a shrub that typically grows to a height of 0.5–1 m (1 ft 8 in – 3 ft 3 in) and has hairy young stems, the hairs between 1.8 and 2.6 mm (0.071 and 0.102 in) long. The leaves are arranged more or less in opposite pairs, elliptic, 32–49 mm (1.3–1.9 in) long and 11–17 mm (0.43–0.67 in) wide, on a petiole 1.5–2.2 mm (0.059–0.087 in) long. Both surface of the leaves are sparsely to densely hairy. The flowers are borne in leaf axils in heads of 24 to 45 on a densely hairy rachis 4–11 mm (0.16–0.43 in) long, each flower on a pedicel 0.7–1.1 mm (0.028–0.043 in) long. The floral tube is 5.5–7.2 mm (0.22–0.28 in) long and white, the sepals 1.3–1.7 mm (0.051–0.067 in) long and densely hairy on the outside. Flowering has been observed in March and April, and from August to November.

== Taxonomy ==
Pimelea mollis was first formally described in 2017 by Anthony Bean in the journal Austrobaileya from specimens he collected on the Callide Range near Biloela in 2009. The specific epithet (mollis) means "soft", referring to the hairs on the stems and leaves.

== Distribution and habitat ==
This pimelea is found inland from the coast in Southern Queensland between Injune and Nanango in the South to Biloela and Dingo in the north where it occurs in dry rainforest and nearby eucalypt forest.

== Conservation status ==
Pimelea mollis is listed as "least concern" under the Queensland Nature Conservation Act 1992.
