= Taragoola =

- Suburb
- Interactive map of Taragoola
- Coordinates: 24.1080°S 151.2327°E
- Country: Australia
- State: Queensland
- LGA: Gladstone Region
- Location: 10.4 km (6.5 mi) SSE of Calliope; 33.3 km (20.7 mi) S of Gladstone; 123 km (76 mi) SE of Rockhampton; 602 km (374 mi) NNW of Brisbane

Government
  - State electorate: Callide
  - Federal division: Flynn

Area
  - Total: 56.1 km^{2} (21.7 sq mi)

Population
  - Total: 0 (2021 census)
  - Density: 0.000/km^{2} (0.000/sq mi)
- Time zone: UTC+10:00 (AEST)
- Postcode: 4680
Suburbs around Taragoola
Calliope	Benaraby	Benaraby
Calliope	Taragoola	Boynedale
Wooderson	Diglum	Boynedale

Taragoola is a rural locality in the Gladstone Region, Queensland, Australia. In the 2021 census, Taragoola had "no people or a very low population".

== Geography ==
The Gladstone–Monto Road runs along the south-western boundary.

Part of Lake Awoonga (formed by the Awoonga Dam in neighbouring Benaraby) is in the west of the locality.

There is a major limestone quarry in the centre of the locality. Apart from the quarry, the land use is grazing on native vegetation.

== History ==
Taragoola State School opened circa 1919 and closed circa 1934.

The Byellee to Monto railway line passed through the locality with two stations serving the locality:

- Taragoola railway station (24.1006°S 151.2194°E)
- Barmundu railway station (24.1350°S 151.1987°E)

== Demographics ==
In the 2016 census, Taragoola had "no people or a very low population".

In the 2021 census, Taragoola had "no people or a very low population".

== Education ==
There are no schools in Taragoola. The nearest government primary and secondary schools are Calliope State School and Calliope State High School, both in neighbouring Calliope to the north-west.
