= Tablelands, Queensland =

Tablelands, Queensland may refer to:

- Tablelands, Queensland (Gladstone Region), a locality in Queensland
- Tablelands, Queensland (South Burnett Region), a locality in Queensland
- Electoral district of Tablelands, an electoral district in Queensland
- Tablelands Region, a local government area in Queensland
