= Callide =

Callide may refer to:

- Callide, Queensland, a locality in the Shire of Banana, Queensland, Australia
- Electoral district of Callide, an electorate for the Queensland Legislative Assembly, Australia
