= Valentine Plains =

- Suburb
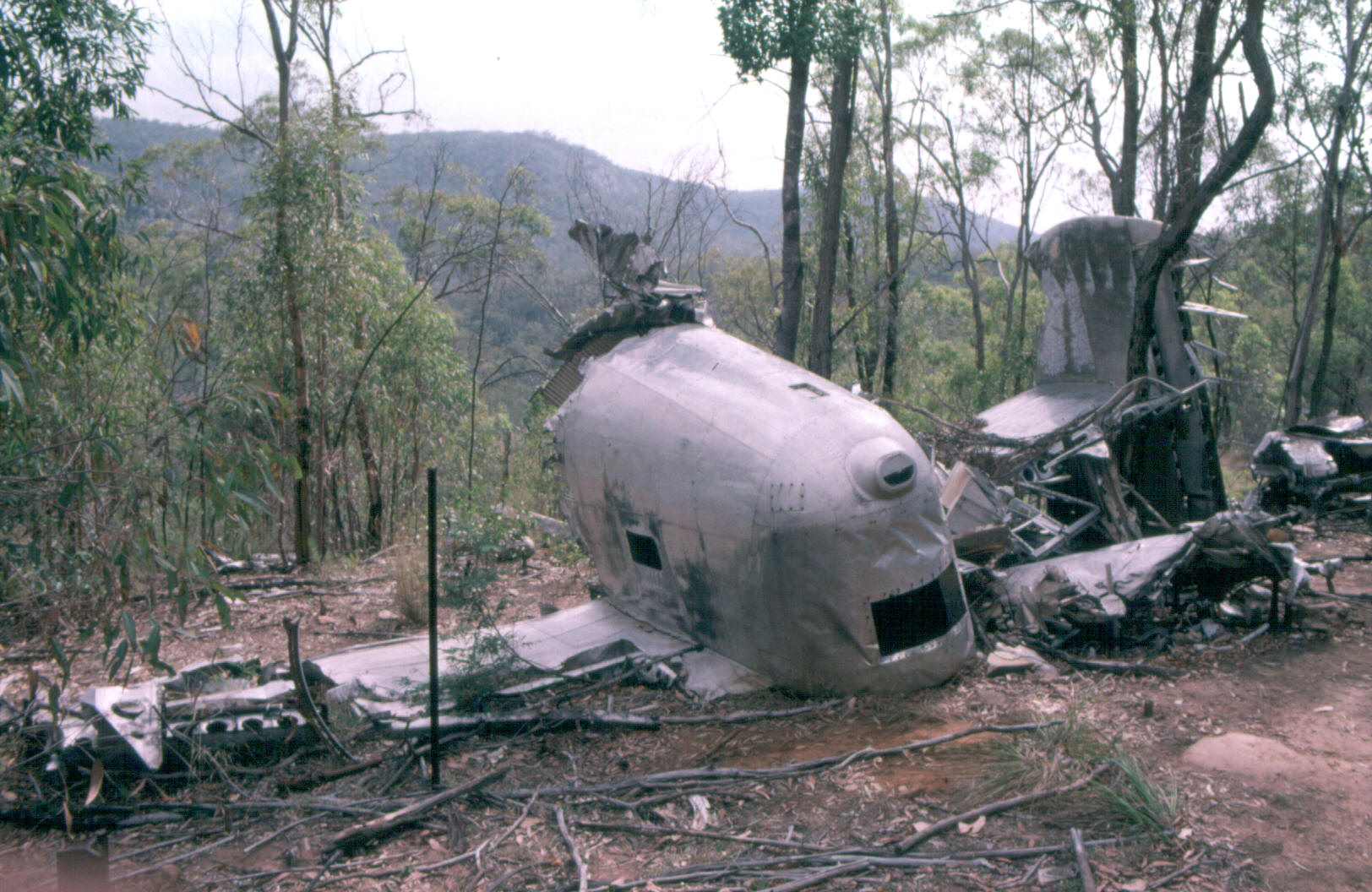
- Wreck site of B-24D Liberator "Beautiful_Betsy", 2011

- Interactive map of Valentine Plains
- Coordinates: 24.4075°S 150.7561°E
- Country: Australia
- State: Queensland
- LGA: Shire of Banana
- Location: 4.5 km (2.8 mi) SE of Biloela; 125 km (78 mi) SW of Gladstone; 147 km (91 mi) S of Rockhampton; 585 km (364 mi) NNW of Brisbane

Government
  - State electorate: Callide
  - Federal division: Flynn

Area
  - Total: 458.5 km^{2} (177.0 sq mi)

Population
  - Total: 373 (2021 census)
  - Density: 0.8135/km^{2} (2.1070/sq mi)
- Time zone: UTC+10:00 (AEST)
- Postcode: 4715
Suburbs around Valentine Plains
Dakenba; Mount Murchison	Dumgree	Tablelands
Biloela; Prospect	Valentine Plains	Tablelands
Thangool	Lawgi Dawes	Cania

Valentine Plains is a rural locality in the Shire of Banana, Queensland, Australia. In the 2021 census, Valentine Plains had a population of 373 people.

== Geography ==
The locality is immediately west of Biloela. The locality is bounded to the north by Callide Creek and Lake Callide, the impoundment of Callide Creek by the Callide Dam. It is bounded to the south-west by Kroombit Creek.

While the name Valentine Plains might suggest relatively flat land, the terrain is mountainous ranging from 180 to 860 metres (590 to 2,820 ft) above sea level with a number of named peaks:

- Amphitheatre Mountain (24.4006°S 150.7974°E) 502 metres (1,647 ft)
- Cave Mountain (24.4332°S 150.8018°E) 394 metres (1,293 ft)
- Mount Kroombit (24.4289°S 150.7265°E) 569 metres (1,867 ft)

The lower elevations are to be found near Biloela and along Callide Creek and Kroombit Creek with elevations generally increasing further to the east.

The south-east of the locality is within Kroombit Tops National Park, which extends into neighbouring Tablelands and Cania and beyond to Boyne Valley. Apart from this protected area, the predominant land use is grazing on native vegetation with some crop growing on the lower elevations in the west of the locality.

== History ==
Valentine Plains Provisional School opened on 8 October 1928. In 1932, it became Valentine Plains State School. It closed on 21 July 1967. It was on Valentine Plains Road (24.4195°S 150.5795°E).

Calvale Provisional School opened on 26 April 1940. In 1947, it became Calvale State School. It closed in December 1956. It was on Calvale Road (approx 24.3749°S 150.6284°E).

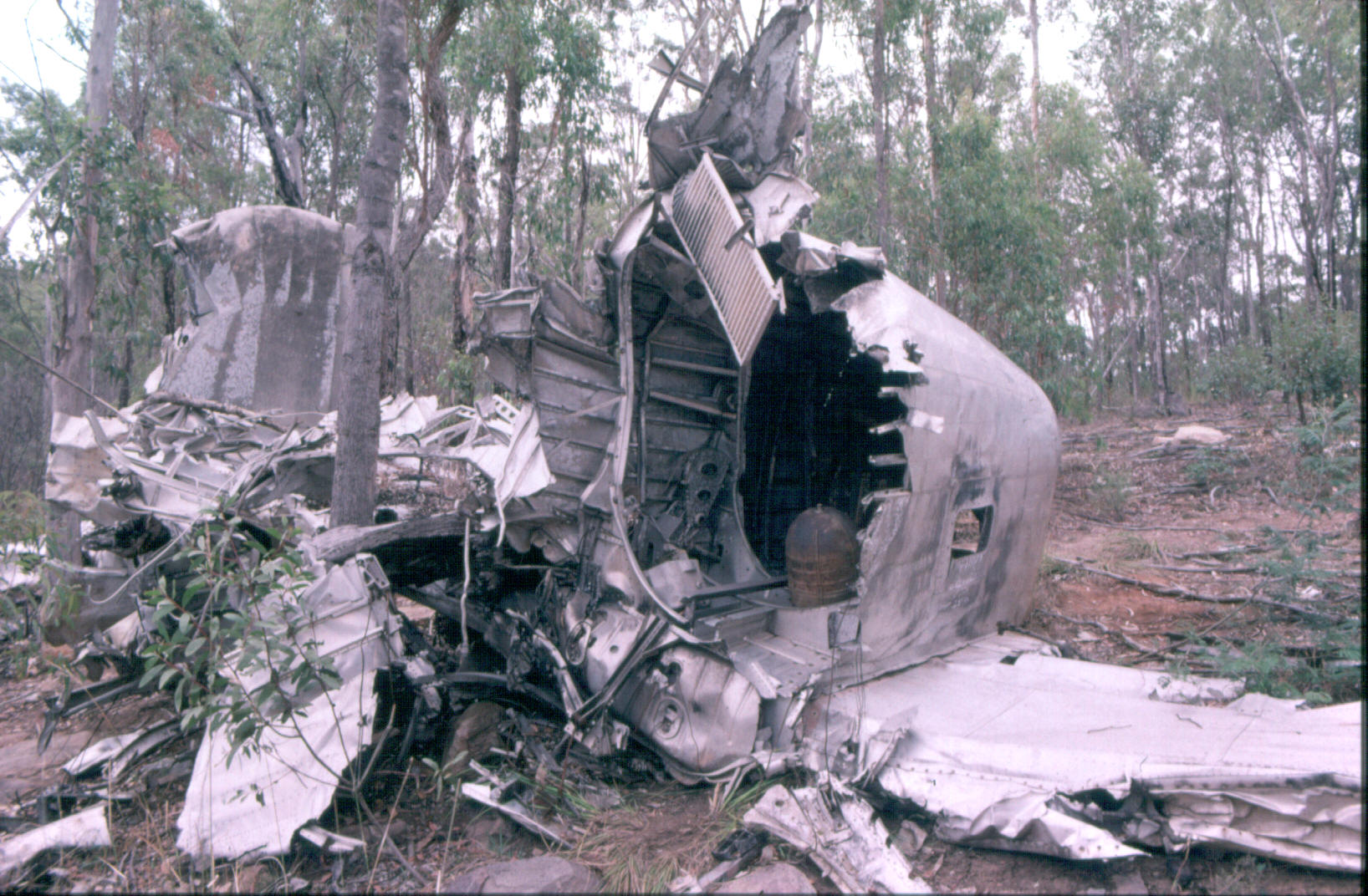
Wreckage of the B-24D Liberator Bomber - Beautiful Betsy

On 2 August 1994, the wreckage of a United States Army Air Forces Consolidated B-24D Liberator, Beautiful Betsy, was discovered in the Valentine Plains section of Kroombit Tops National Park. The aircraft had gone missing in stormy weather on 26 February 1945 while on a "Fat Cat" run from Darwin to Brisbane - transporting men and supplies as part of a regular flight. Eight servicemen lost their lives; six of the men were American aviators and two were British Royal Air Force Spitfire pilots. The crash site is well-presented, with a plaque erected by National Parks (approx 24.46441°S 150.91426°E).

== Demographics ==
In the 2016 census, Valentine Plains had a population of 394 people.

In the 2021 census, Valentine Plains had a population of 373 people.

== Education ==
There are no schools in Valentine Plains. The nearest government primary schools are Biloela State School in neighbouring Biloela to the west, Thangool State School in neighbouring Thangool in the south-west, and Mount Murchison State School in the neighbouring Mount Murchison to the north-west. The nearest government secondary school is Biloela State High School in Biloela.

The Biloela Study Centre of CQ University is at 64 Valentine Plains Road (24.4113°S 150.5213°E).

== Amenities ==
The Valentine Plains branch of the Queensland Country Women's Association meets at the CWA Hall at 271 Valentines Plains Road.

Biloela Golf Club is at 451 Valentine Plains Road (24.4210°S 150.5555°E). It has a 14-hole golf course.

== Facilities ==
Biloela Lawn Cemetery is at 216 Valentine Plains Road (24.4165°S 150.5336°E). It is operated by the Banana Shire Council.
