= Boynedale, Queensland =

Boynedale
- Suburb
- Interactive map of Boynedale
- Coordinates: 24.2322°S 151.2838°E
- Country: Australia
- State: Queensland
- LGA: Gladstone Region
- Location: 31.0 km (19.3 mi) S of Calliope; 54.3 km (33.7 mi) S of Gladstone CBD; 531 km (330 mi) NNW of Brisbane

Government
  - State electorate: Callide
  - Federal division: Flynn

Area
  - Total: 283.8 km^{2} (109.6 sq mi)

Population
  - Total: 13 (2021 census)
  - Density: 0.0458/km^{2} (0.119/sq mi)
- Time zone: UTC+10:00 (AEST)
- Postcode: 4680
Suburbs around Boynedale
Taragoola	Benaraby	Iveragh
Diglum	Boynedale	Bororen
Boyne Valley	Boyne Valley	Boyne Valley

Boynedale is a rural locality in the Gladstone Region, Queensland, Australia. In the 2021 census, Boynedale had a population of 13 people.

== Geography ==
The Lake Awoonga is part of the northern boundary of the locality. It is the impoundment of the Boyne River by the Awoonga Dam.

== History ==
The locality takes its name from the Boyne River, which in turn was named on 14 November 1823 by Surveyor-General John Oxley on the cutter HM Mermaid.

The Gladstone to Monto railway line opened its first section from Byellee (previously known as Boyne Valley Junction) to Many Peaks was opened on 25 July 1910 with Boynedale railway station (24.2160°S 151.2463°E) serving the Boynedale locality. The station closed on 8 December 1997. The line closed to regular services in 2002 with the final train on the line being a steam special run from Monto to Maryborough in 2005.

The locality was officially named and bounded on 27 August 1999.

== Demographics ==
In the 2016 census, Boynedale had a population of 17 people.

In the 2021 census, Boynedale had a population of 13 people.

== Heritage listings ==
Boynedale has a number of heritage-listed sites, including:

- Glengarry Homestead, Gladstone–Monto Road (24.1981°S 151.2415°E)

== Education ==
There are no schools in Boynedale. The nearest government primary school is Nagoorin State School in Nagoorin in the neighbouring Boyne Valley to the south and Calliope State School in Calliope to the north. The nearest government secondary schools are Calliope State High School (to Year 12) in Calliope to the north and Miriam Vale State School (to Year 10) in Miriam Vale to the south-east. However, some students in Boyndale may be too distant to attend these secondary school; the alternatives are distance education and boarding school.

== See also ==
- List of schools in Central Queensland
