= Wooderson =

Wooderson may refer to:

- Sydney Wooderson, an English middle-distance runner
- Wooderson, Queensland, a locality in the Gladstone Region, Queensland, Australia
