= Diglum, Queensland =

Diglum
- Suburb
- Interactive map of Diglum
- Coordinates: 24.2569°S 151.0858°E
- Country: Australia
- State: Queensland
- LGA: Gladstone Region
- Location: 40.1 km (24.9 mi) SW of Calliope; 63.4 km (39.4 mi) SSW of Gladstone CBD; 153 km (95 mi) SSE of Rockhampton; 549 km (341 mi) NNW of Brisbane

Government
  - State electorate: Callide
  - Federal division: Flynn

Area
  - Total: 376.0 km^{2} (145.2 sq mi)

Population
  - Total: 56 (2021 census)
  - Density: 0.1489/km^{2} (0.386/sq mi)
- Time zone: UTC+10:00 (AEST)
- Postcode: 4680
Suburbs around Diglum
Mount Alma	Wooderson	Taragoola
Tablelands	Diglum	Boynedale
Tablelands	Boyne Valley	Boyne Valley

Diglum is a rural locality in the Gladstone Region, Queensland, Australia. In the 2021 census, Diglum had a population of 56 people.

== Geography ==
The Gladstone–Monto Road runs along the north-eastern boundary.

Apart from Futter Conservation Park, a small protected area in the north-west of the locality, the land use is almost entirely grazing on native vegetation.

== History ==
Dan Dan State School opened in 1920 and closed in 1930. Dan Dan Creek is located within Diglum.

== Demographics ==
In the 2016 census, Diglum had a population of 36 people.

In the 2021 census, Diglum had a population of 56 people.

== Education ==
There are no schools in Diglum. The nearest government primary schools are Nagoorin State School in Nagoorin, Boyne Valley, to the south-east and Calliope State School in Calliope to the north. The nearest government secondary school is Calliope State High School in Calliope.
