= Benaraby =

- Town
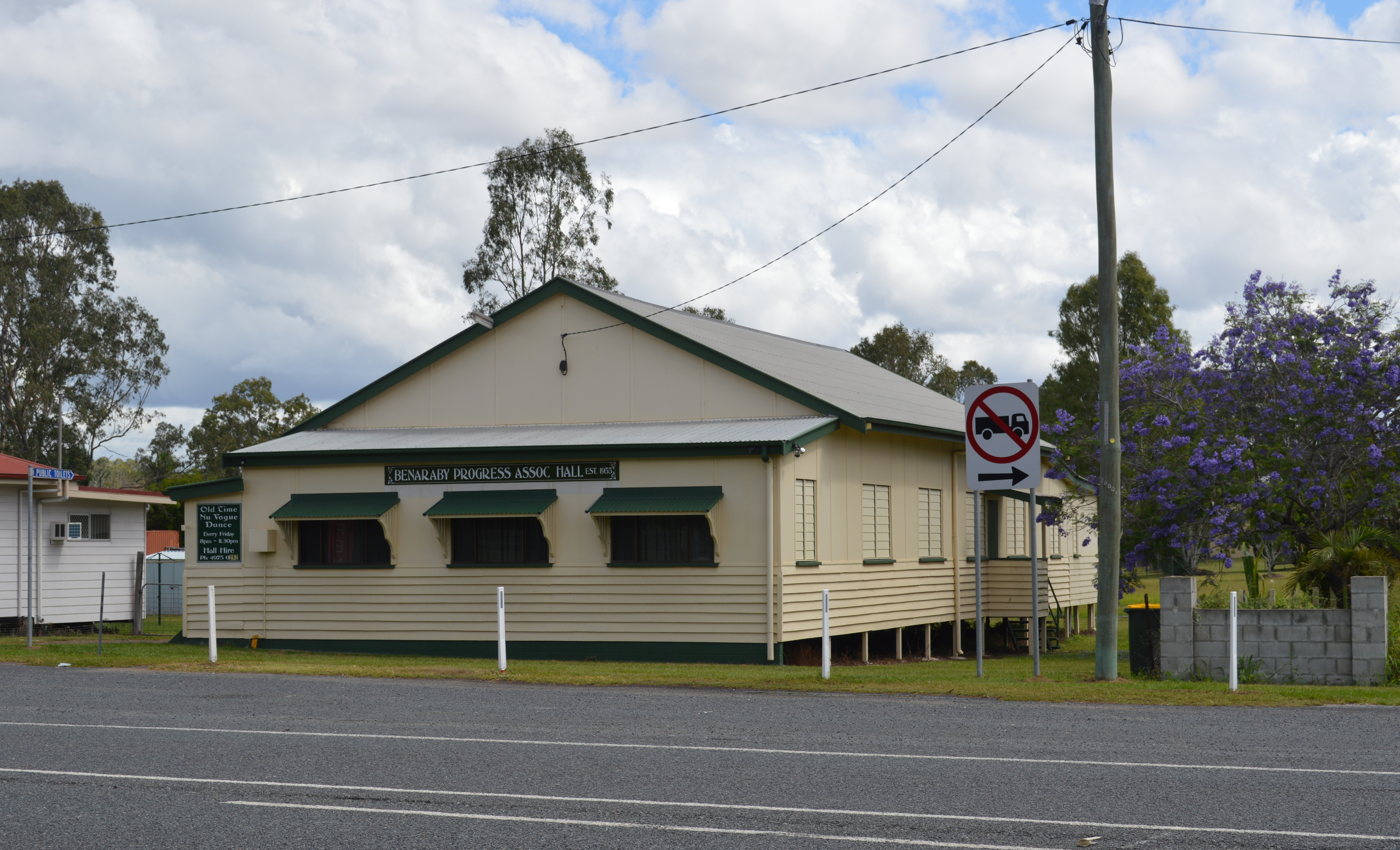
- Benaraby Progress Association Hall, 2017

- Interactive map of Benaraby
- Coordinates: 24.0020°S 151.3166°E
- Country: Australia
- State: Queensland
- LGA: Gladstone Region
- Location: 23.4 km (14.5 mi) S of Gladstone; 124 km (77 mi) SE of Rockhampton; 509 km (316 mi) N of Brisbane

Government
  - State electorates: Callide; Gladstone
  - Federal division: Flynn

Area
  - Total: 105.8 km^{2} (40.8 sq mi)

Population
  - Total: 1,166 (2021 census)
  - Density: 11.021/km^{2} (28.544/sq mi)
- Time zone: UTC+10:00 (AEST)
- Postcode: 4680
Localities around Benaraby
Calliope	Wurdong Heights	Tannum Sands
Calliope	Benaraby	Iveragh
Taragoola	Boynedale	Iveragh

Benaraby is a rural town and locality in the Gladstone Region, Queensland, Australia. In the 2021 census, the locality of Benaraby had a population of 1,166 people.

== Geography ==
The town of Benaraby in the north-east of the locality with two neighbourhoods based around two former railway stations of the same name:

- Alkina (24.0333°S 151.3333°E)
- Marrawing (24.05°S 151.3666°E)

The Bruce Highway enters the locality from the east (Tannum Sands), bypasses the town to the north, exiting to the north (Wurdong Heights).

Lake Awoonga is in the south of the locality and is the impoundment of the Boyne River by the Awoonga Dam. The Boyne River flows north from the dam through the locality, passing east of the town and then forms part of the north-eastern boundary of the locality.

== History ==
Boyne River Provisional School opened on 12 July 1886 and closed in November 1886. It reopened on 24 Aug 1903. In 1907, it was renamed Benaraby Provisional School. On 1 January 1909, it became Benaraby State School.

Benaraby Post Office opened around 1912 (receiving offices known as Boyne Bridge, Boyne River, Annandale and Benaraby had been open from 1890) and closed in 1982.

Originally a rural locality, in recent times it has become more of a residential suburb for the workers in Gladstone, Boyne Island and Tannum Sands.

== Demographics ==
In the 2006 census, the town of Benaraby had a population of 594 people.

In the 2016 census, the locality of Benaraby had a population of 1,219 people.

In the 2021 census, the locality of Benaraby had a population of 1,166 people.

== Education ==
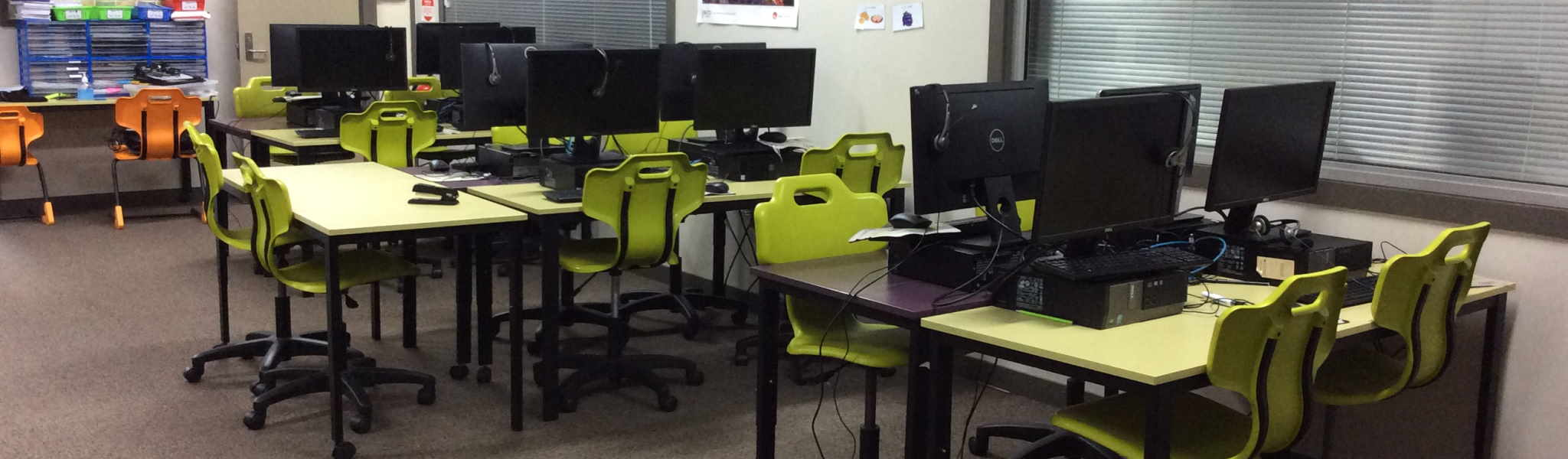
Classroom, Benaraby State School, 2022

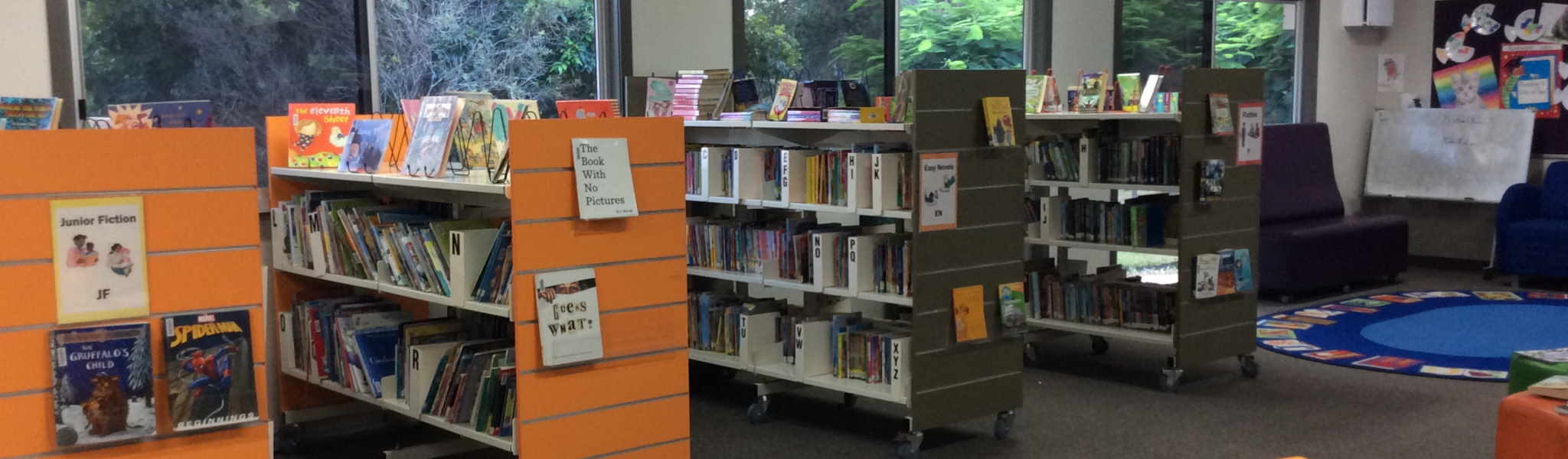
Library, Benaraby State School, 2022

Benaraby State School is a government primary (Prep-6) school for boys and girls at 17 O'Connor Road (24.0037°S 151.3238°E). In 2018, the school had an enrolment of 105 students with 7 teachers (5 full-time equivalent) and 11 non-teaching staff (6 full-time equivalent).

There are no secondary schools in Benaraby. The nearest government secondary school is Tannum Sands State High School in neighbouring Tannum Sands to the north-east.

== Amenities ==
Benaraby contains a petrol station, a primary school, a community hall, a nursery and three accommodation providers.

== "This Big" sculpture ==
In June 2017, a 4.5-metre-tall (15 ft) sculpture called "This Big" was installed at the Caltex Truck & Travel Centre on the Bruce Highway at Benaraby which was officially unveiled in September 2017.

Commissioned by site owner Martin Spinks, the "This Big" sculpture depicts a giant pair of hands measuring a barramundi. Inspired by the Gladstone Region's aluminium industry and fishing culture, it was created by Lump Studio in Melbourne where ten people worked on the sculpture over a period of six months before it was transported to Benaraby where it took three days to install. The sculpture consists of corten steel, aluminium and powder coating. 3D modelling was used to create the hands which consist of 226 pieces of steel welded together. A total of 11 separate aluminium segments make up the barramundi.

The "This Big" sculpture was officially unveiled by Escape with ET host and former rugby league player Andrew Ettingshausen on 23 September 2017. Ettingshausen said the sculpture is not only intended to be a designated highway landmark but to also represent Benaraby as being the gateway to newly created fishing zones and "the real start of the barramundi fishery in Queensland".
