= Dumgree, Queensland =

Dumgree
- Suburb
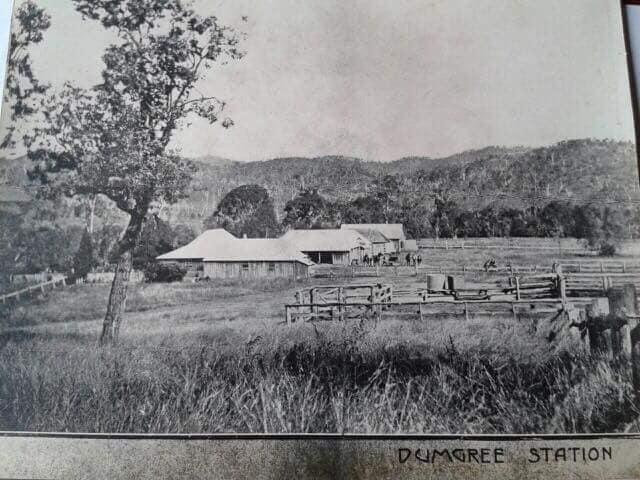
- Dumgree Homestead, circa 1913

- Interactive map of Dumgree
- Coordinates: 24.1713°S 150.6388°E
- Country: Australia
- State: Queensland
- LGA: Shire of Banana
- Location: 33.6 km (20.9 mi) NE of Biloela; 87.6 km (54.4 mi) SW of Gladstone; 145 km (90 mi) S of Rockhampton; 587 km (365 mi) NNW of Brisbane

Government
  - State electorate: Callide
  - Federal division: Flynn

Area
  - Total: 784.5 km^{2} (302.9 sq mi)

Population
  - Total: 63 (2021 census)
  - Density: 0.0803/km^{2} (0.2080/sq mi)
- Time zone: UTC+10:00 (AEST)
- Postcode: 4715
Suburbs around Dumgree
Jambin	Ulogie	Mount Alma
Callide	Dumgree	Mount Alma
Mount Murchison	Valentine Plains	Tablelands

Dumgree is a rural locality in the Shire of Banana, Queensland, Australia. In the 2021 census, Dumgree had a population of 63 people.

== Geography ==
The Dawson Highway enters the locality from the north-east (Mount Alma) and exits to the west (Callide).

The Moura railway line enters the locality from the east (Mount Alma) and exits to the north-west (Jambin). The locality is served by two railway stations:

- Mount Rainbow railway in the east of the locality (24.1427°S 150.7105°E)
- Dumgree railway station in the west of the locality (24.1701°S 150.5648°E)

There are a number of protected areas within the locality (from north to south):

- Don River State Forest in the north of the locality, extending into neighbouring Ulogie to the north
- Calliope Range State Forest in the east of the locality
- Callide Timber Reserve in the south-west of the locality

Dumgree has the following mountains (from north to south):

- Mount Eugenie (24.0553°S 150.5874°E), 565 metres (1,854 ft)
- Mount Gerard (24.0918°S 150.5565°E), 424 metres (1,391 ft)
- Rocky Point Mountain (24.1531°S 150.7857°E), 563 metres (1,847 ft)
- Mount Buckland (24.1749°S 150.7371°E), 595 metres (1,952 ft)
- Blackfellow Mountain (24.1763°S 150.7962°E), 562 metres (1,844 ft)
- Specimen Hill (24.1919°S 150.7662°E), 671 metres (2,201 ft)
- Bottle Tree Mountain (24.1923°S 150.5988°E), 427 metres (1,401 ft)
- Mount Fane (24.2452°S 150.7354°E), 577 metres (1,893 ft)

Apart from the protected areas, the land use in the locality is predominantly grazing on native vegetation. There is mining for coal and oil shale in the south-west of the locality, some of which takes place within the Callide Timber Reserve.

== History ==
John Saunders Bell selected a pastoral run of 300 square miles (780 km^{2}) in 1856. He called it Dumgree after the place in Dumfrieshire, Scotland, where he attended school.

== Demographics ==
In the 2016 census, Dumgree had a population of 55 people.

In the 2021 census, Dumgree had a population of 63 people.

== Education ==
There are no schools in Dumgree. The nearest government primary schools are Mount Murchison State School in neighbouring Mount Murchison to the south-west and Wowan State School in Wowan to the north-west. The nearest government secondary school is Biloela State High School in Biloela to the south-west. Students living in the north-west of Dumgree might be too distant from these schools for a daily commute; the alternatives are distance education and boarding schools.
