= Callide Dam =

Dam in Queensland, Australia

- Location of the dam in Queensland
- Country: Australia
- Location: 11 km (6.8 mi) east of Biloela, Queensland
- Coordinates: 24°21′58″S 150°37′00″E
- Purpose: Irrigation; Industrial water supply
- Status: Operational
- Opening date: 1965
- Built by: Perini-Davis Constructions
- Operator: SunWater

Dam and spillways
- Type of dam: Embankment dam
- Impounds: Callide Creek
- Height (foundation): 37 m (121 ft)
- Length: 2,118 m (6,949 ft)
- Dam volume: 1,487×10^{3} m^{3} (52.5×10^{6} cu ft)
- Spillway type: Controlled
- Spillway capacity: 5,700 m^{3}/s (200,000 cu ft/s)

Reservoir
- Creates: Lake Callide
- Total capacity: 136,370 ML (110,560 acre⋅ft)
- Catchment area: 518 km^{2} (200 sq mi)
- Surface area: 1,240 ha (3,100 acres)
- Maximum water depth: 34.8 m (114 ft)
- Normal elevation: 205 m (673 ft) AHD

The Callide Dam is an earth and rock-fill embankment dam across the Callide Creek, located near Biloela, Queensland, Australia. Completed in 1965, the resultant reservoir, Lake Callide, was formed for the purpose of supplying water for irrigation and the thermal Callide Power Station in Mount Murchison. The dam is operated by SunWater.

The dam is 37 metres (121 ft) high and 2,118 metres (6,949 ft) long. When at full capacity, the reservoir holds 136,370 megalitres (110,560 acre⋅ft) at an average depth of 10.5 metres (34 ft) over a surface area of 1,240 hectares (3,100 acres), drawing from a 518-square-kilometre (200 sq mi) catchment. The irrigated area is approximately 272 square kilometres (105 sq mi).

== History ==
In 1988, gates were added to the spillway to increase the capacity of the dam. SunWater completed a multi-station upgrade program to ensure highest levels of safety for dams of their responsibility. The spillway at the Callide Dam was scheduled to be upgraded in the 'medium-term' range from 2008. In 2021, the spillway gates were to be removed and serviced to address vibration during their operation. In February 2015, the radial spillway gates on the dam automatically opened as a result of heavy rain from Tropical Cyclone Marcia. Severe flooding resulted downstream from the dam. In May 2015, a class action lawsuit against SunWater was launched by residents affected by the flooding; however, it was dropped in February 2016.

The dam's highest recorded level was 102.37% of capacity in March 2017 as a result of heavy rains from ex Tropical Cyclone Debbie.

== Fishing ==
A Stocked Impoundment Permit is required to fish in the dam.

== See also ==
- List of dams and reservoirs in Australia
