= Tablelands, Queensland (Gladstone Region) =

Tablelands
- Suburb
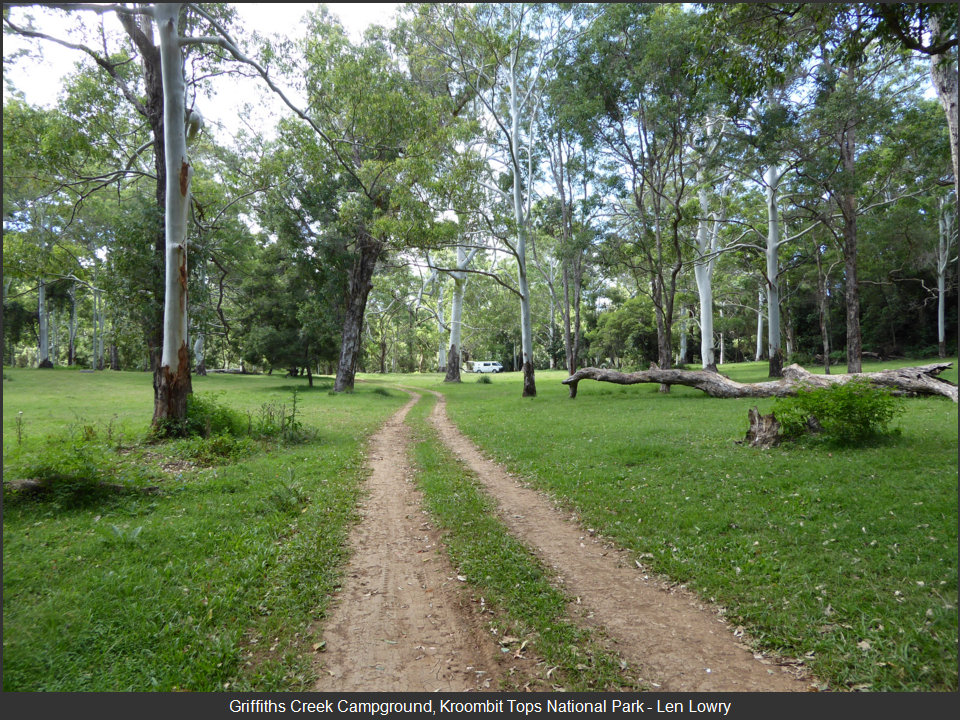
- Griffiths Creek Campground at Kroombit Tops National Park, in Tablelands, 2020

- Interactive map of Tablelands
- Coordinates: 24.3313°S 150.9127°E
- Country: Australia
- State: Queensland
- LGA: Gladstone Region
- Location: 52.0 km (32.3 mi) SW of Calliope; 75.4 km (46.9 mi) SW of Gladstone; 165 km (103 mi) SSE of Rockhampton; 589 km (366 mi) NNW of Brisbane

Government
  - State electorate: Callide
  - Federal division: Flynn

Area
  - Total: 385.6 km^{2} (148.9 sq mi)

Population
  - Total: 0 (2021 census)
  - Density: 0.0000/km^{2} (0.000/sq mi)
- Time zone: UTC+10:00 (AEST)
- Postcode: 4680
Suburbs around Tablelands
Dumgree	Mount Alma	Diglum
Valentine Plains	Tablelands	Boyne Valley
Valentine Plains	Valentine Plains	Cania

Tablelands is a rural locality in the Gladstone Region, Queensland, Australia. In the 2021 census, Tablelands had "no people or a very low population".

== Geography ==
The terrain is mountainous ranging from 320 to 930 metres (1,050 to 3,050 ft), with the following named peaks:

- Mount Rideout (24.3263°S 150.9898°E) 849 metres (2,785 ft)
- Mount Seaview (Futters Hat) (24.2785°S 150.9423°E) 815 metres (2,674 ft)
- Amys Peak (24.3420°S 150.9892°E) 930 metres (3,050 ft)

The centre, east, south, and west of the locality are within the Kroombit Tops National Park. Apart from this, the predominant land use is grazing on native vegetation.

== History ==
Tableland Provisional School opened in 1905 and closed c. 1916. It was on Tableland Road (approx 24.29139°S 150.95093°E).

== Demographics ==
In the 2016 census, Tablelands had "no people or a very low population".

In the 2021 census, Tablelands had "no people or a very low population".

== Education ==
There are no schools in Tablelands. For students in the north-east of the locality, the nearest government primary schools are Calliope State School in Calliope to the north-east and Nagoorin State School in Nagoorin to the east, while the nearest government secondary school is Calliope State High School, also in Calliope.

For students in other parts of the locality, there are no schools close enough for a daily commute. The options are distance education and boarding school.
