= Jambin, Queensland =

Jambin
- Town
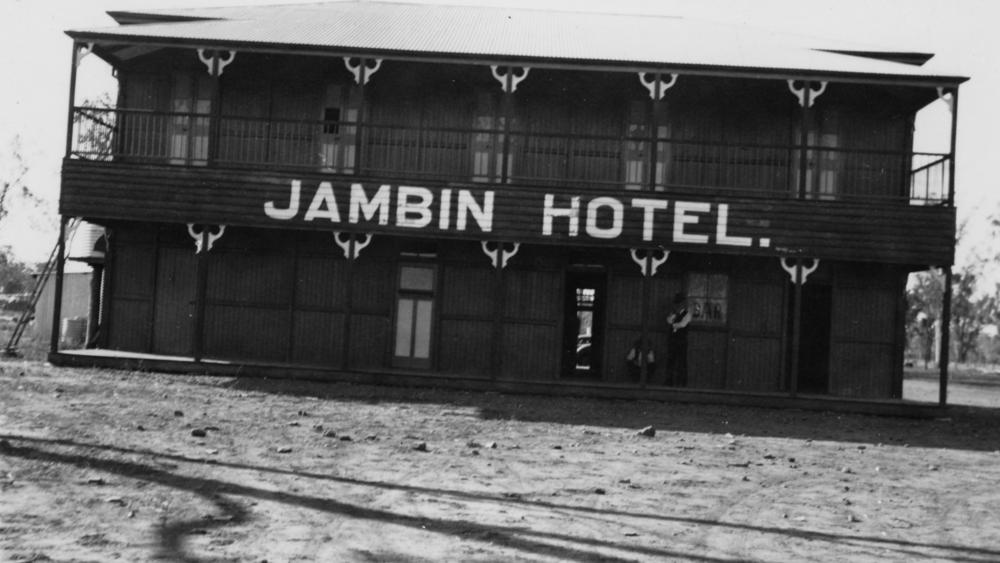
- Jambin Hotel, circa 1920

- Interactive map of Jambin
- Coordinates: 24.1730°S 150.3747°E
- Country: Australia
- State: Queensland
- LGA: Shire of Banana
- Location: 29.1 km (18.1 mi) NNW of Biloela; 115 km (71 mi) S of Rockhampton; 125 km (78 mi) WSW of Gladstone; 597 km (371 mi) NW of Brisbane

Government
  - State electorate: Callide
  - Federal division: Flynn

Area
  - Total: 279.5 km^{2} (107.9 sq mi)

Population
  - Total: 207 (2021 census)
  - Density: 0.7406/km^{2} (1.918/sq mi)
- Time zone: UTC+10:00 (AEST)
- Postcode: 4702
Localities around Jambin
| Goovigen | Ulogie | Dumgree |
| Goovigen | Jambin | Dumgree |
| Greycliffe | Orange Creek | Callide |

Jambin is a rural town and locality in the Shire of Banana, Queensland, Australia. In the 2021 census, the locality of Jambin had a population of 207 people.

== Geography ==
Jambin is located in Central Queensland on the Burnett Highway which runs roughly north–south through the town. Callide Creek is immediately to the west of the town; it is a tributary of the Don River.

The Callide Valley railway line passed through the locality with Jambin railway station (24.1955°S 150.3697°E) serving the town. That section of the line is now closed; the station was abandoned in 1993.

However, other parts of the Callide Valley line in Jamin were integrated into the Moura railway line, which serves the mining industry, connecting mines with the Port of Gladstone. The following stations in Jambin are on the Moura line (from north to south):

- Annandale railway station (24.1917°S 150.4642°E)
- Boundary Hill railway station (24.2062°S 150.4782°E)
- Earlsfield railway station (24.2287°S 150.4161°E)
- Koonkool railway station (24.2380°S 150.4220°E)
- Argoon railway station (24.2541°S 150.4336°E)

All of these stations are operational apart from Argoon which is now abandoned. Boundary Hill station is on a balloon loop that serves the Boundary Hill coal mine (in neighbouring Callide).

== History ==
The town takes its name from the Jambin railway station, which in turn was named on 27 April 1923 by the Queensland Railway Department and is believed to be an Aboriginal word meaning echidna.

Callide Provisional School opened on 24 November 1925. On 1 June 1927, it became Callide State School. It closed in 1971. It was on Callide Road (24.3012°S 150.4588°E). Although it is within the town of Callide, it is within the present-day boundaries of Jambin.

The town first appears on a 1949 survey map.

Jambin was originally established as a supply depot for the railway, which was established in 1924. This opened up the area for new settlers, many of them pursuing dairying. Cream was sent to the butter factory at Wowan.

Jambin Post Office opened on 1 February 1926 (a receiving office had been open from 1924).

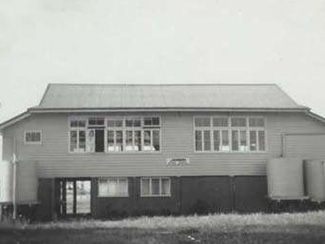
Original school building at Jambin State School, circa 1930

Jambin State School opened on 11 February 1929 with 16 students under principal Kate Collins. The first school building was a high-set two-room structure with a semi-enclosed verandah.

Arogoon (also written as Argoon) State School opened on 30 July 1936, but was renamed Earlsfield State School by October 1936. It closed in 1958. It was on the northern corner of Earlsfield Road and Earlsfield Pit Road (24.2052°S 150.4336°E).

The mobile library service commenced in 2004.

== Demographics ==
The locality of Jambin was created 25 November 2016. The northern part of the new locality was formerly the locality of Smoky Creek and the southern part of the new locality was formerly the locality of Argoon. Therefore, there is no census data available for the locality of Jambin prior to this time. However, in the 2011 census, Smoky Creek had a population of 308 people and Argoon had a population of 295, while in the 2016 census, Smoky Creek had a population of 179 people and Argoon had a population of 151.

In the 2021 census, the locality of Jambin had a population of 207 people.

== Heritage listings ==
Jambin has a number of heritage-listed sites, including:

- Kilbirnie Homestead, Argoon-Kilburnie Road (24.2467°S 150.5056°E)

== Education ==
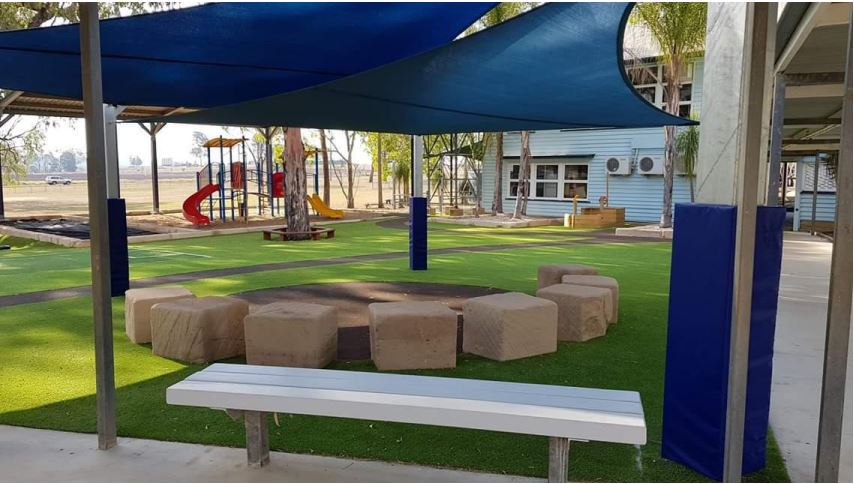
Jambin State School, 2020

Jambin State School is a government primary (Prep-6) school for boys and girls at 25 Jambin Three Ways Road, adjacent to the Burnett Highway (24.1738°S 150.3751°E). In 2017, the school had an enrolment of 26 students with 3 teachers and 5 non-teaching staff (3 full-time equivalent).

There are no secondary schools in Jambin. The nearest government secondary school is Biloela State High School in Biloela to the south.

== Amenities ==
Banana Shire Council operate a fortnightly mobile library service to Jambin and the school.

The Jambin branch of the Queensland Country Women's Association meets in the QCWA Room in the Jambin Hall at 180 Burnett Highway.

== Events ==
Jambin hosts its annual Champagne Campdraft in May each year.

The annual Working Cattle Dog trials are held in June.

Since 2017, the annual King and Queen of CQ Boar Hunting Competition has been held over three days in either late May or early June. In what is claimed to be Australia's largest boar hunting competition, hundreds of competitors compete for prizes in an attempt to cull the boar population while raising money for schools in Jambin and Goovigen. Almost 900 pigs were killed in the 2021 competition which attracted hunters from New South Wales and North Queensland.

== In popular culture ==
The novel "Dust" by Christine Bongers is set around the town of Jambin. In the novel the main character's family, the Vanderbomms, attend church at Jambin.
