= Lake Awoonga =

Dam and water reservoir in Central Queensland, Australia

Awoonga Dam
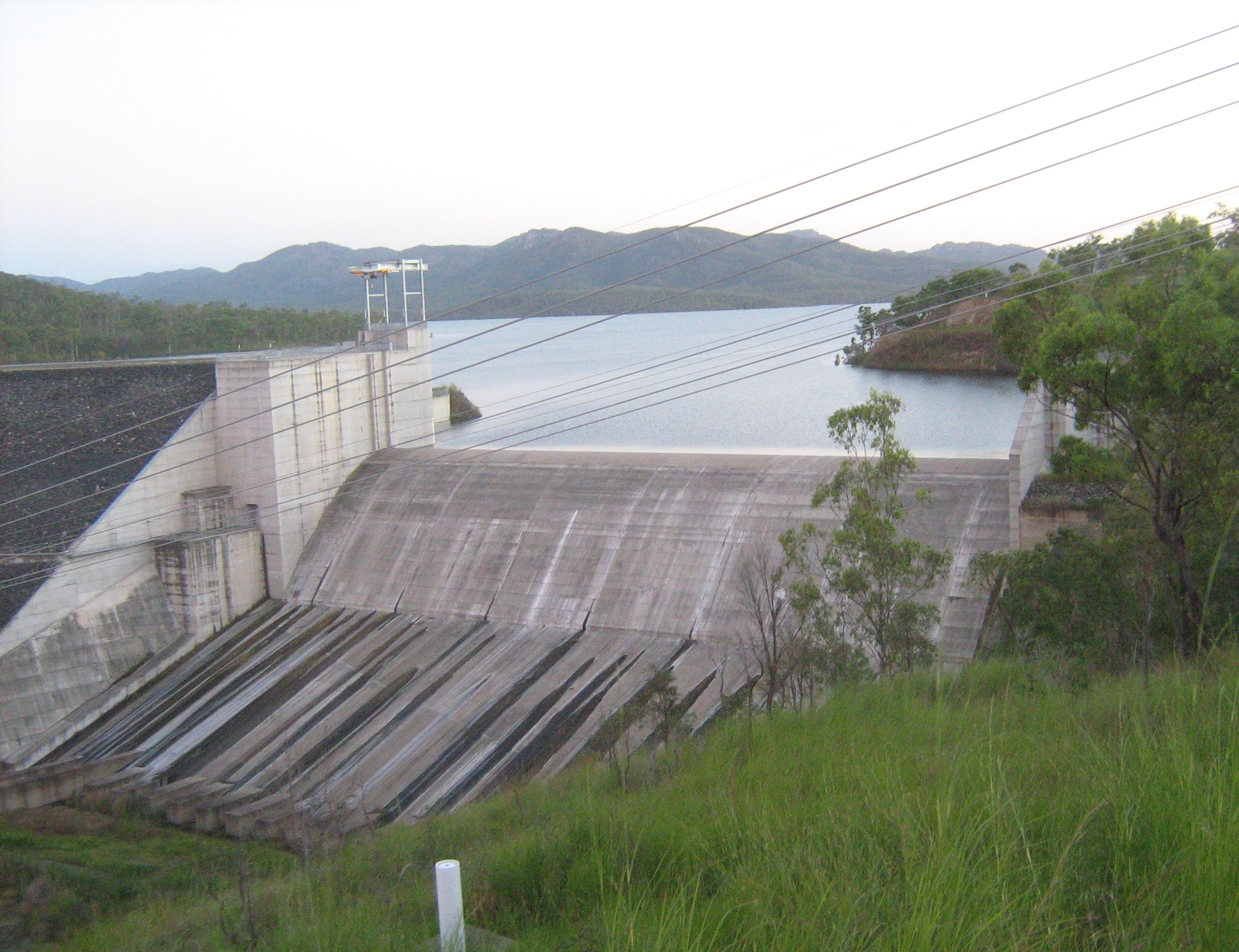
- The dam and reservoir in 2010

- Location of the dam and reservoir in Queensland
- Interactive map of Awoonga Dam
- Country: Australia
- Location: Benaraby, Central Queensland
- Coordinates: 24°04′12″S 151°18′41″E
- Purpose: Water supply
- Status: Operational
- Opening date: 1984
- Built by: Thiess Contractors (1984)
- Operator: Gladstone Area Water Board

Dam and spillways
- Type of dam: Rock-fill dam
- Impounds: Boyne River
- Height (foundation): 53 m (174 ft)
- Length: 858 m (2,815 ft)
- Dam volume: 1,065×10^{3} m^{3} (37.6×10^{6} cu ft)
- Spillway type: Uncontrolled
- Spillway capacity: 8,100 m^{3}/s (290,000 cu ft/s)

Reservoir
- Creates: Lake Awoonga
- Total capacity: 777,000 ML (630,000 acre⋅ft)
- Catchment area: 2,230 km^{2} (860 sq mi)
- Surface area: 6,780 ha (16,800 acres)
- Maximum length: 658 m (2,159 ft)
- Normal elevation: 40 m (130 ft) AHD

The Awoonga Dam is a rock-filled embankment dam across the Boyne River, located near Benaraby, in Central Queensland, Australia, approximately 30 km (19 mi), or 30 minutes drive, from Gladstone. The resultant reservoir is Lake Awoonga, that serves as the main water supply for the Gladstone region. The lake has free recreation areas and recreational fishing is permitted.

== Specifications ==
Originally built across the Boyne River south west of Gladstone in the early 1950s as a 12-metre-high (39 ft) mass concrete weir, it was raised by 6 metres (20 ft) shortly after. In the 1980s it was raised again, as a rockfill structure with a concrete upstream face slab to a full supply level of 30 metres (98 ft) AHD. The dam was raised for a third time in 2002 to its current full supply level of 40 metres (130 ft) AHD. The embankment was formed from rock excavated from a quarry on the side of the dam wall. The embankment is over 650 metres (2,130 ft) long and 54.4 metres (178 ft) high, with a volume of approximately 2 million cubic metres (71×10^{6} cu ft) of rock. This design of the current dam allows for further raising, if necessary, through the addition of gates to the top of the spillway. The maximum capacity of the resultant reservoir is 777,000 megalitres (2.05×10^{11} US gallons). The second raising of the dam was built by Thiess Brothers and was completed in March 1985.

The reservoir reached its lowest level of 7.44% capacity in February 2003, and its highest recorded level of 192.9% (8.3 metres (27 ft) over the spillway) in January 2013 as a result of heavy rain from ex-Tropical Cyclone Oswald. The dam continued spilling from 25 January until early May.

When full, the lake is 40 metres (130 ft) AHD. Approximately 200,000 fish are released each year including barramundi and some mangrove jack. By early 2006 a total of over 2.9 million fish had been released into Lake Awoonga including 2.4 million barramundii, 470,000 sea mullet and 15,000 mangrove jack. These fish were bred at Gladstone Area Water Board's Fish Hatchery facility. As of November 2008, the largest barramundi caught weighed in at 36.5 kilograms (80 lb). Lake Awoonga is one of the only reservoirs in Australia to be stocked with mangrove jack.

== Fauna ==
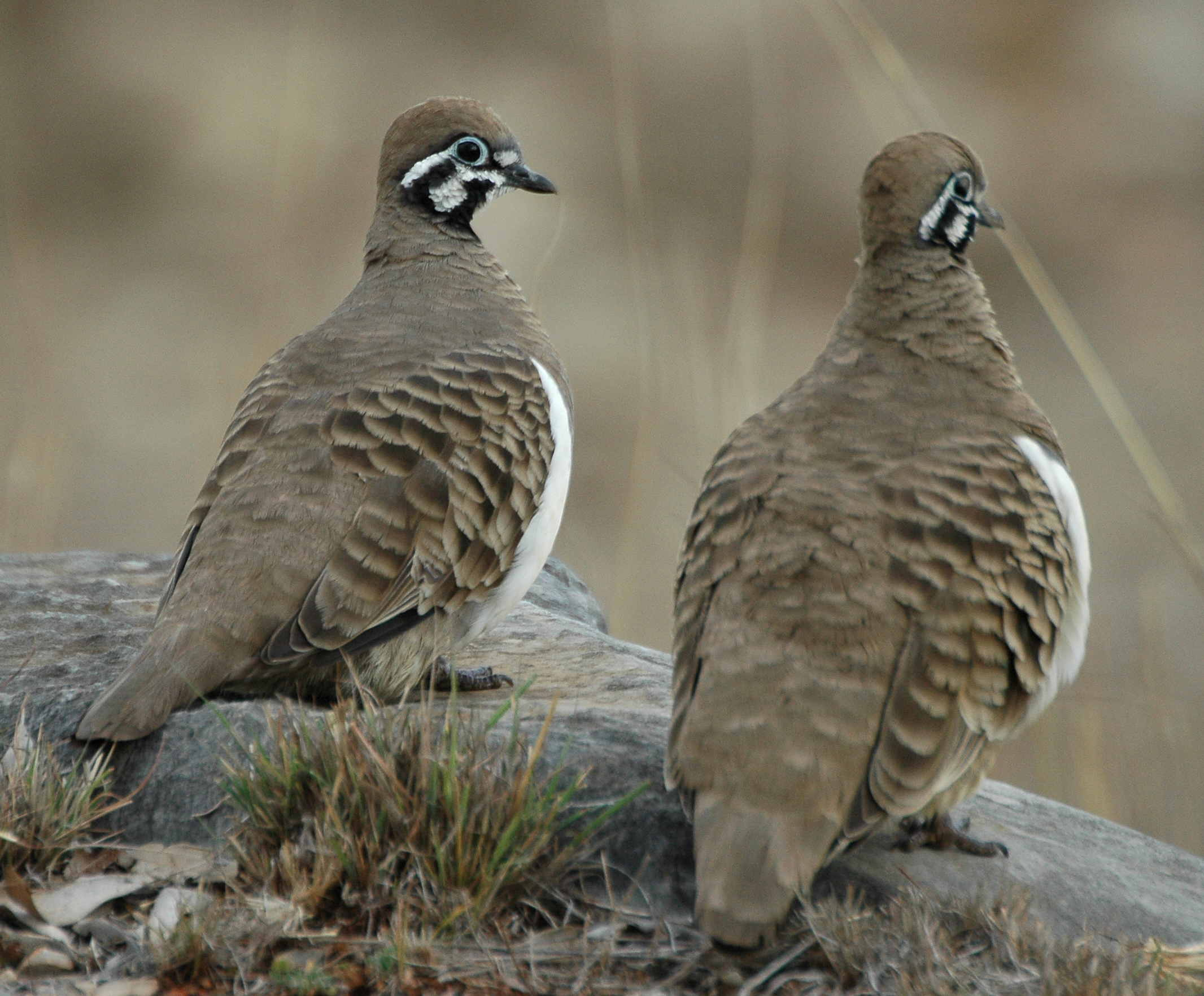
Squatter pigeon

Lake Awoonga is home to an array of small animals, several of which are of conservation significance including the grey-headed flying fox and the yellow-bellied glider. Aquatic vegetation maintains an array of small animals that support the fish, eels, turtles, platypus and birds. Other species of birds, reptiles, and native fauna including bandicoots, rufous bettongs, kangaroos, wallabies, greater gliders, and brushtail possums can be found around the lake.

The lake hosts more than 225 species of birds. Species include the southern squatter pigeon which is listed as vulnerable and a further twenty-seven bird species listed on International Migratory Conservation Agreement Lists.

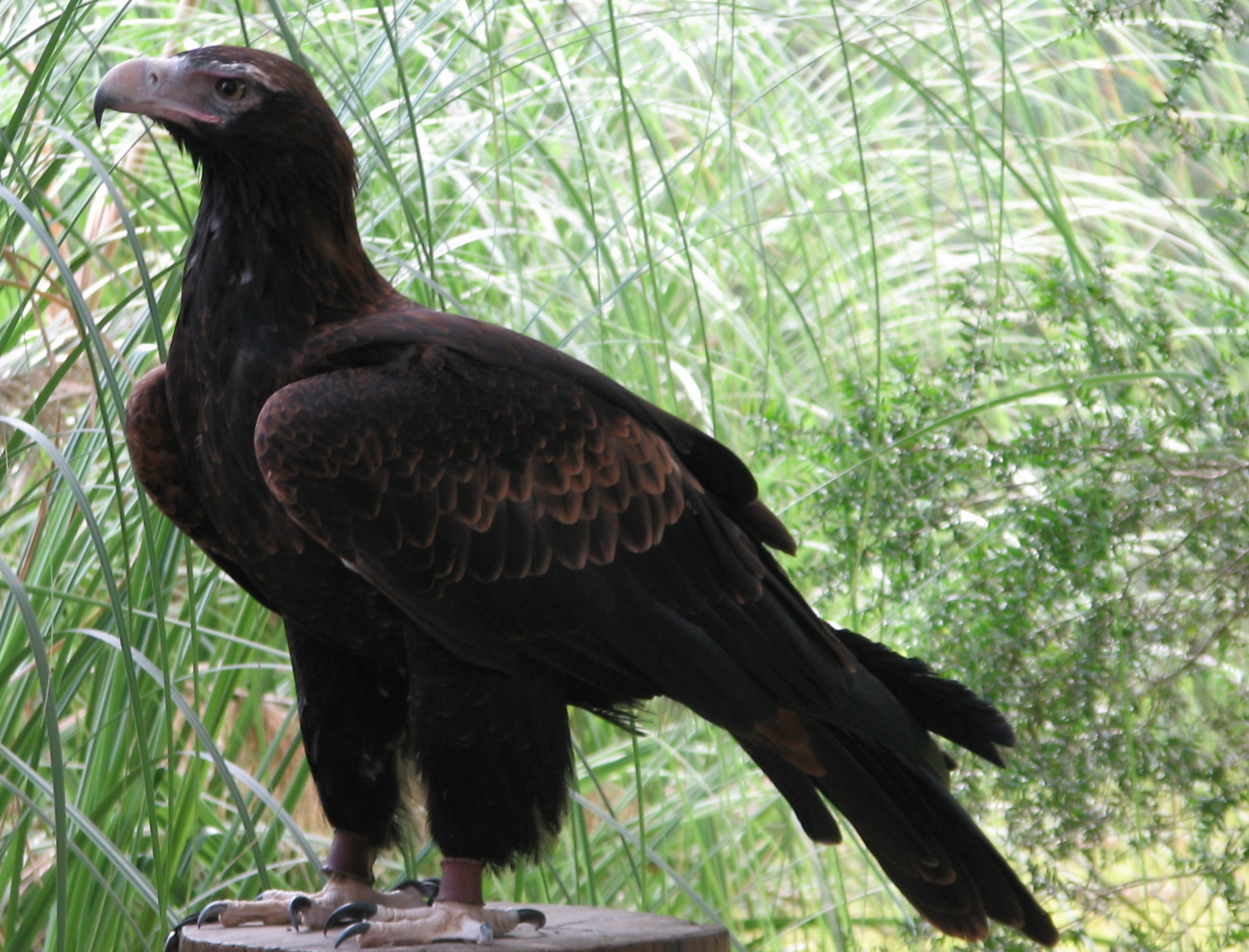
Wedge-tailed eagle

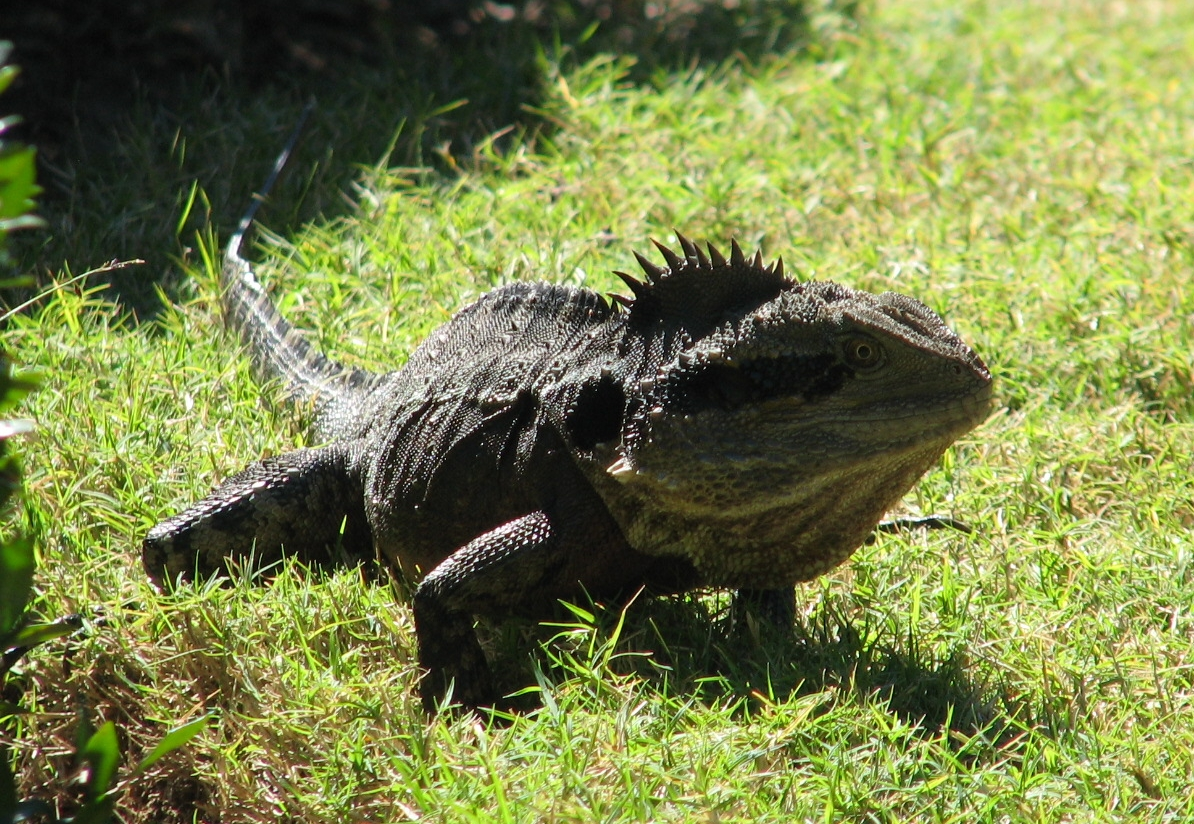
Eastern water dragon

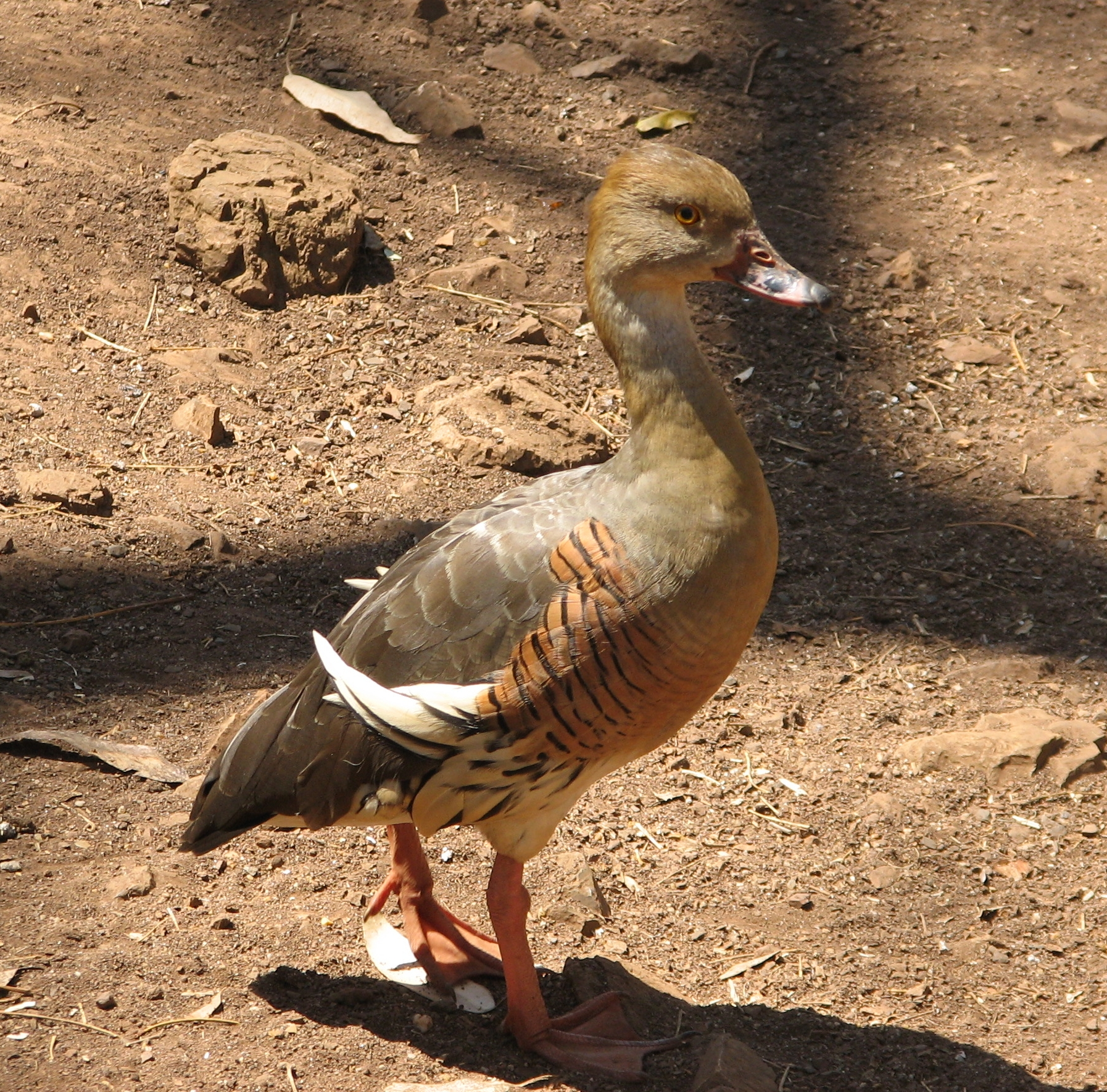
Plumed whistling duck

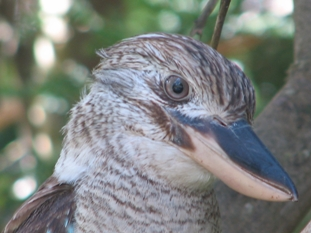
Blue-winged kookaburra

The Gladstone Area Water Board has a fish breeding program in place and breeds barramundi and mangrove jack for stocking into Lake Awoonga as well as some of the surrounding waterways. Approximately 200,000 fish are released into Lake Awoonga each year (200,000 barramundi and small numbers of mangrove jack). The fish are bred at a purpose-built fish hatchery, operated jointly by the Gladstone Area Water Board and the Gladstone Ports Corporation.

The hatchery is one of the largest breeders of barramundi fingerlings in Queensland and their mangrove jack breeding program has resulted in Lake Awoonga holding the largest stocks in Australia with more than 50,000 released. Other fish species include Agassiz's glass perch, banded grunter, barramundi, bony bream, eastern rainbowfish, eeltail catfish, fly-specked hardyhead, forktail catfish, gudgeon, long-finned eel, longtom, mouth almighty, sea mullet, snub-nose garfish and spangled perch. Also present in low numbers are Hyrtl's tandan, mangrove jack, saratoga, silver perch, sleepy cod, sooty grunter, and yellowbelly. Since 1996, over 2.5 million barramundi fingerlings and 470,000 mullet fingerlings have been released into the lake. Barramundi in the 10–25 kg range are regularly caught from the lake.

== Flora ==
More than 415 plant varieties play a vital role in the health of the Lake Awoonga region. Ranging from vine thickets and rainforests to tall woodlands and grassy woodlands, they include over 45 confirmed species of aquatic plants such as ribbon weed, hornwort and sedges found in the shallow water areas. Aquatic plants have an important function in that they provide food and cover for animals, stabilise the river bottom against erosion and recycle nutrients.

Several plants of conservation significance exist in the region Awoonga including Persoonia Amaliae and Eucalyptus melanoleuca which are listed as rare, while Cycas Megacarpa and Grevillea venusta are noted as vulnerable. Banksia integrifolia and Xanthorrhoea latifolia are common protected species that can also be found in the area.

There are a number of declared alien plants and environmental weeds proliferating throughout the river system and the catchment including parthenium, salvinia, cat's claw vine, lantana, oleander and rubbervine. A pest management plan has been developed to supplement the annual weed control programme.

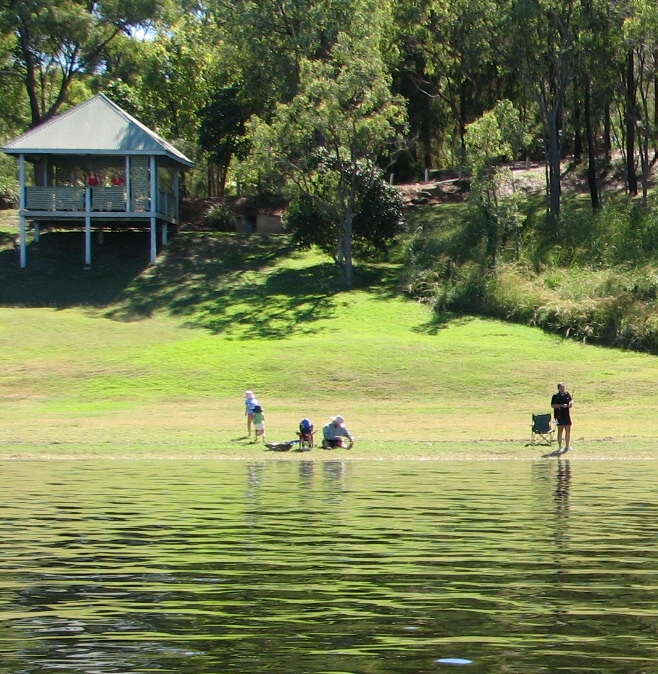
Recreation sheds at Lake Awoonga

The Gladstone Area Water Board has carried out vegetation re-establishment programs in order to replace remnant endangered regional ecosystems impacted by the lake.

== Recreation facilities ==
Swimming is permitted from the shore and there is a 24-hour boat ramp that provides access for sailing, fishing, and skiing etc. Various watercraft, including house boats can be hired and organised. Fishing cruises are also available. The waters of Lake Awoonga are controlled by Queensland Boating and Fisheries Patrol and Queensland Water Police and all users of the lake are required to adhere to the posted speed limits.

The lake is a popular fishing spot, especially for barramundi. The barramundi closed season does not apply to Lake Awoonga, although some limits do apply. Camping is permitted at two places on Lake Awoonga, the Caravan Park and the Boynedale Bush Camp. The main recreation area is provided free to the public and includes picnic shelters, barbecues, walking paths.

The Boynedale Bush camp is a basic camping facility around the southern side of Lake Awoonga, ten minutes from the townships of Many Peaks and Ubobo. Access is via a dirt road from the Gladstone to Monto Road which may become boggy in wet weather. There is no potable water at this site.

== Glengarry Homestead ==
The area inundated by the dam includes much of the Glengarry pastoral station, making it unviable as a pastoral property and so it was purchased by the Gladstone Area Water Board on 1 August 1979. It is expected when the dam is at its highest levels of inundation, the heritage-listed Glengarry Homestead will be on an island within the dam.

== Gallery ==
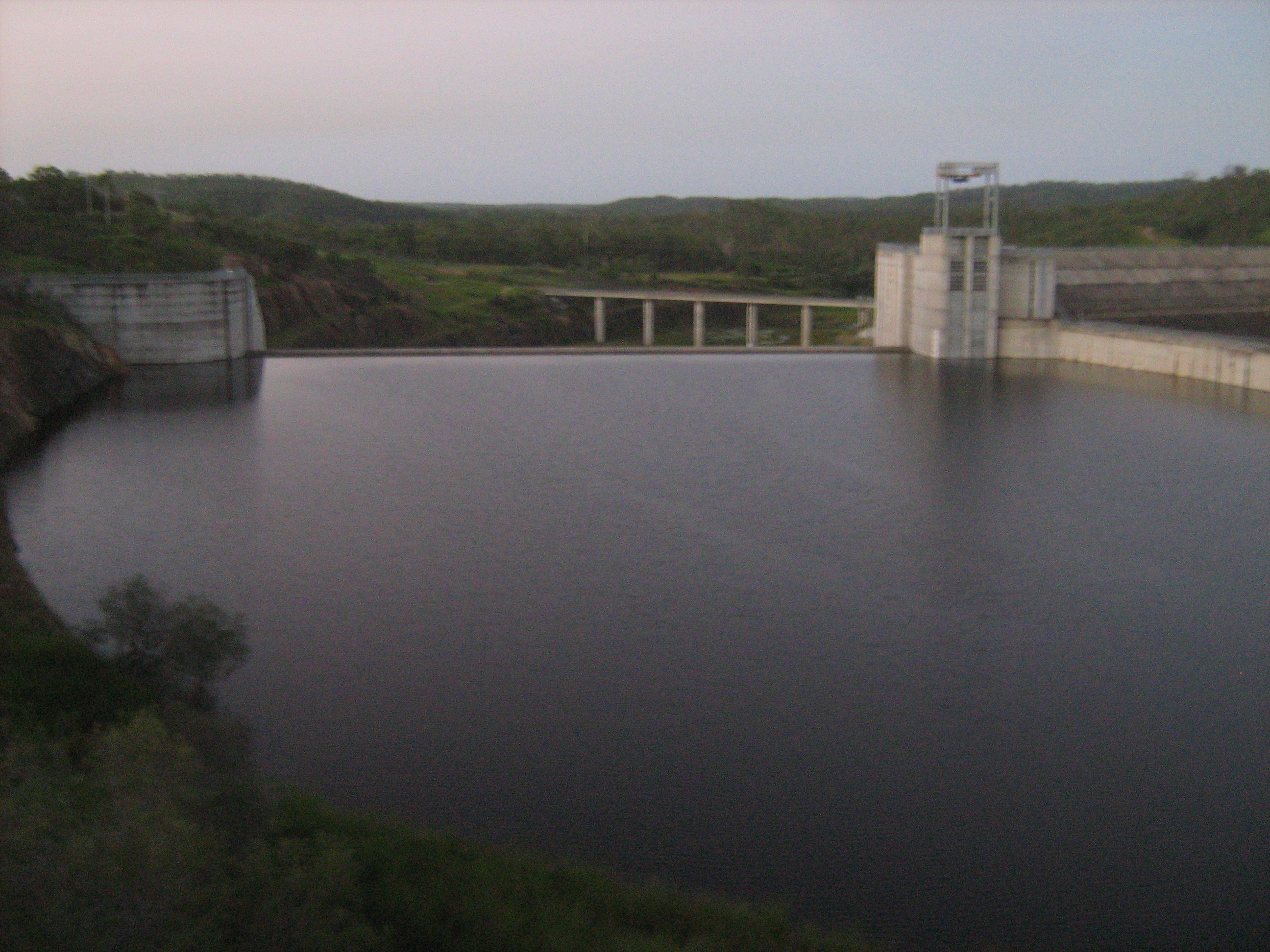
View of wall from observation area

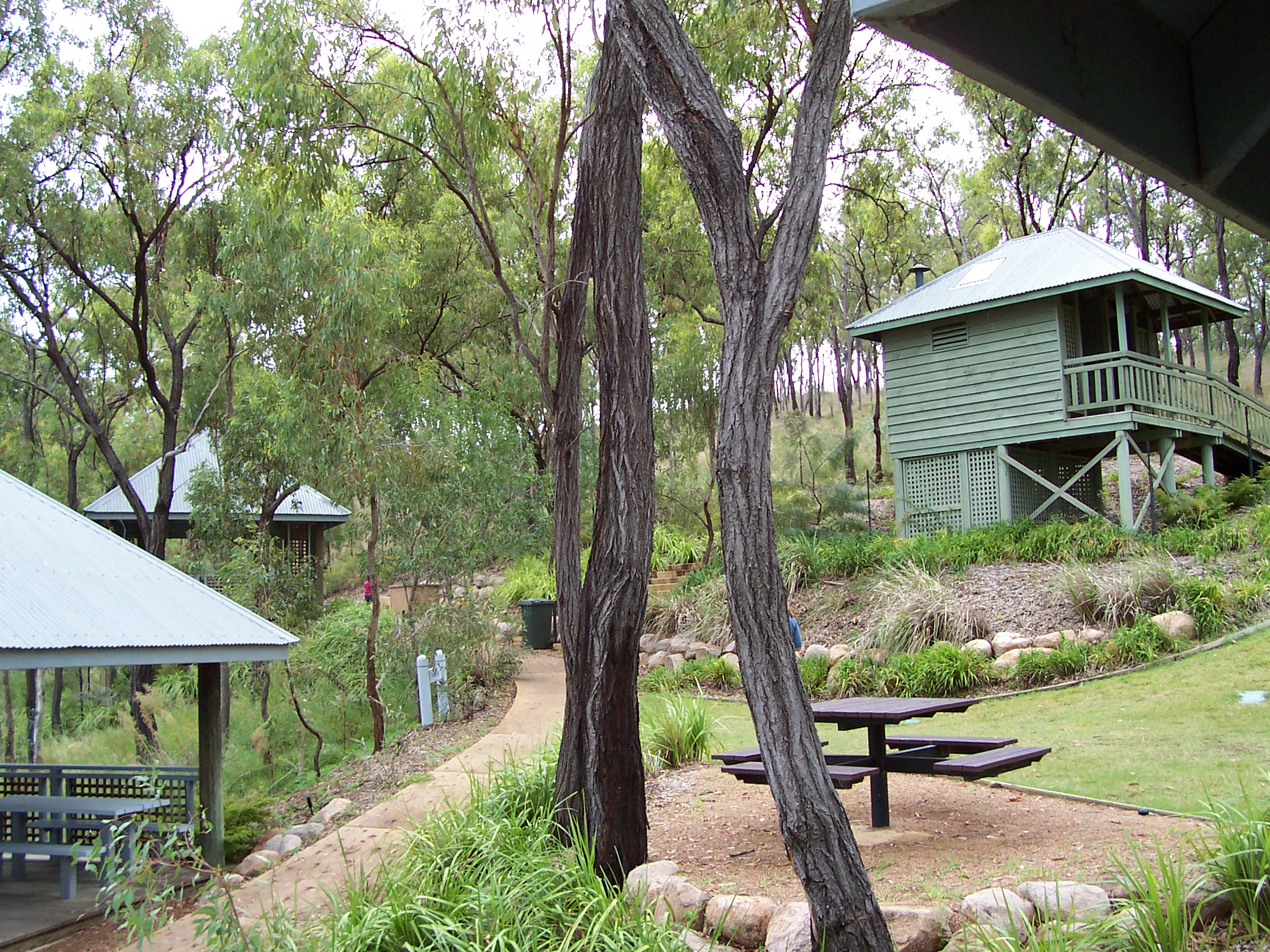
Some of the shelters at Lake Awoonga

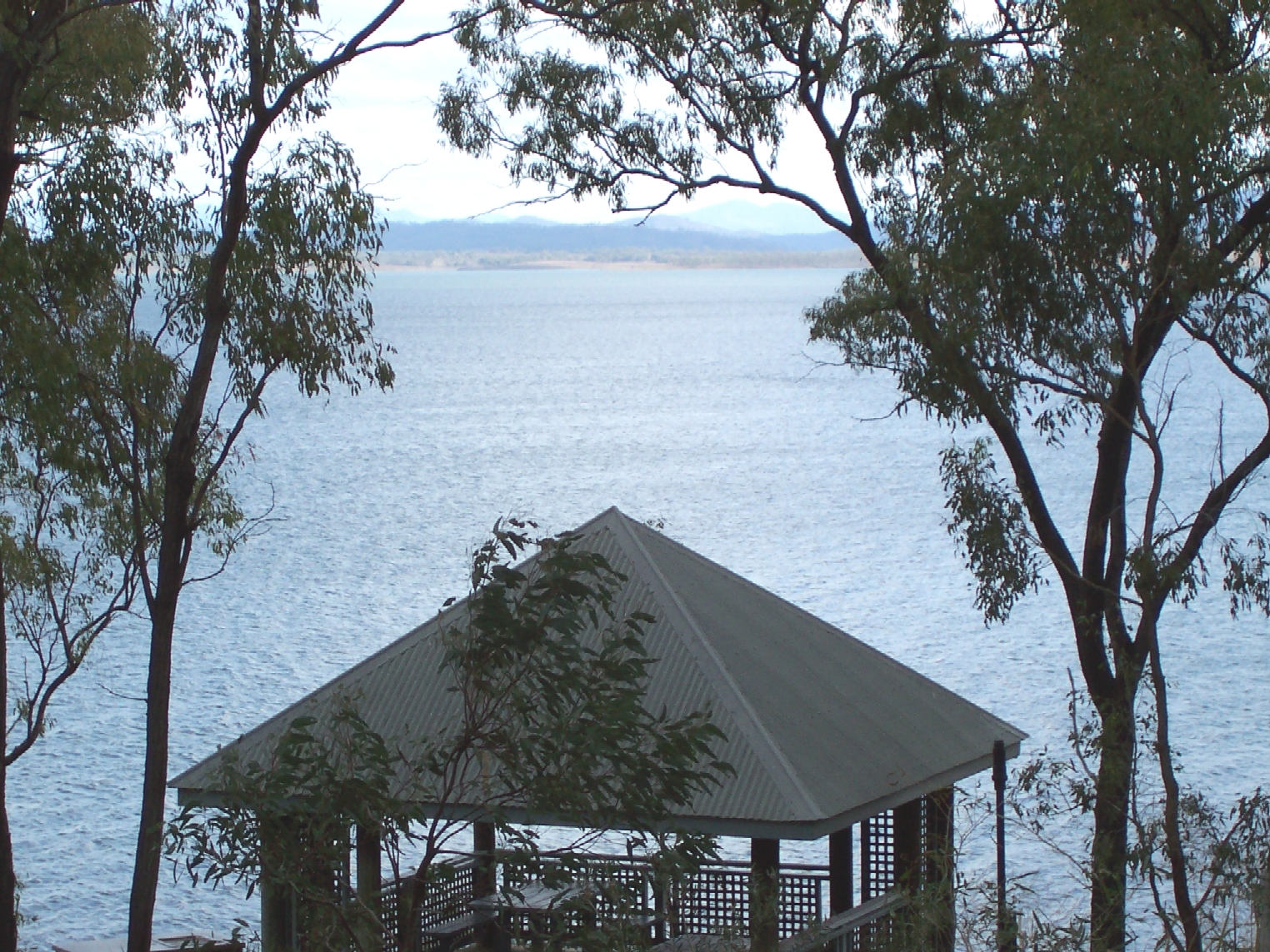
A recreation shelter overlooking the lake

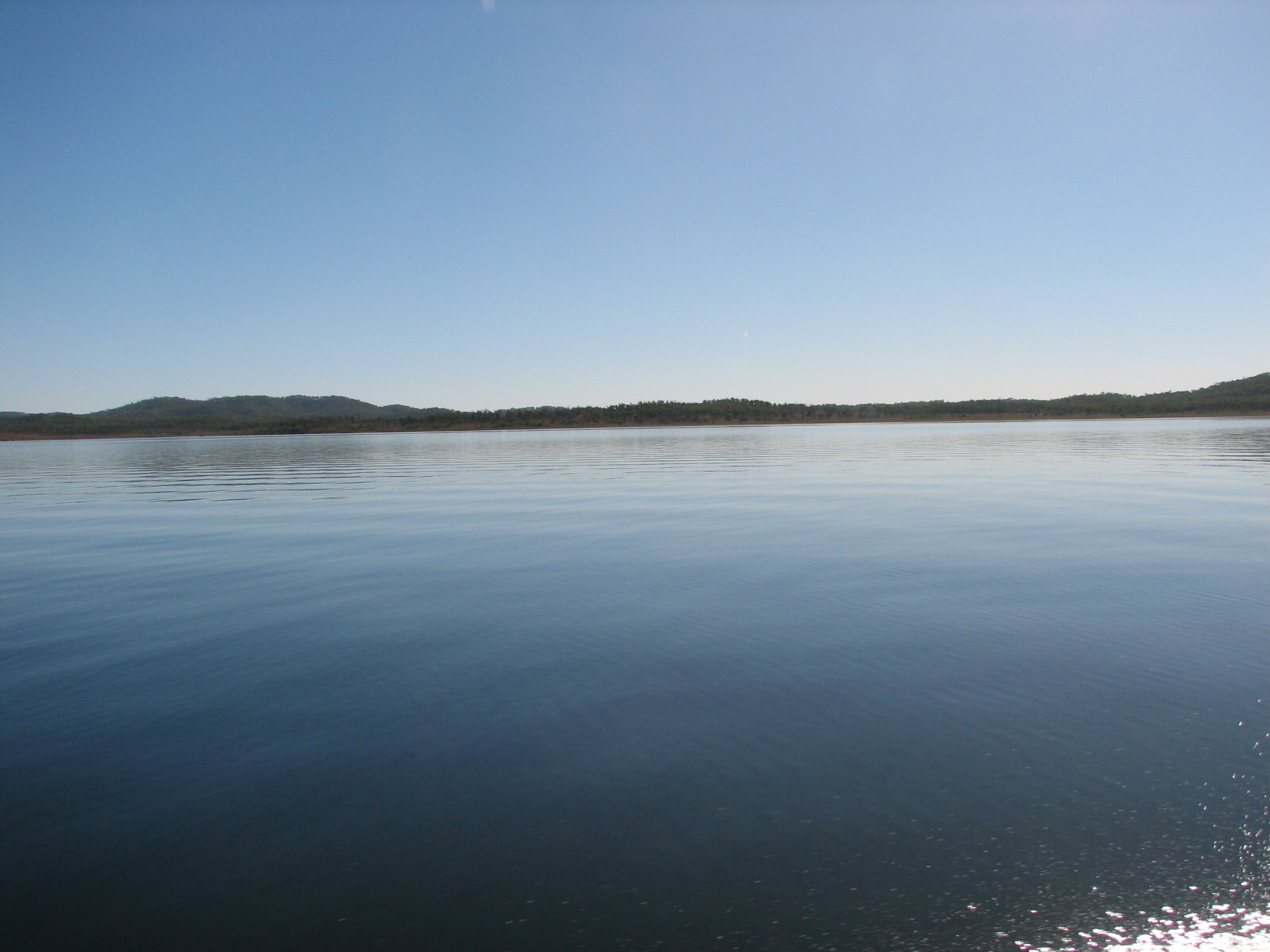
A view of Lake Awoonga while boating

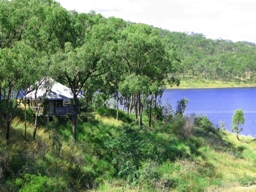
Shelter shed overlooking the lake

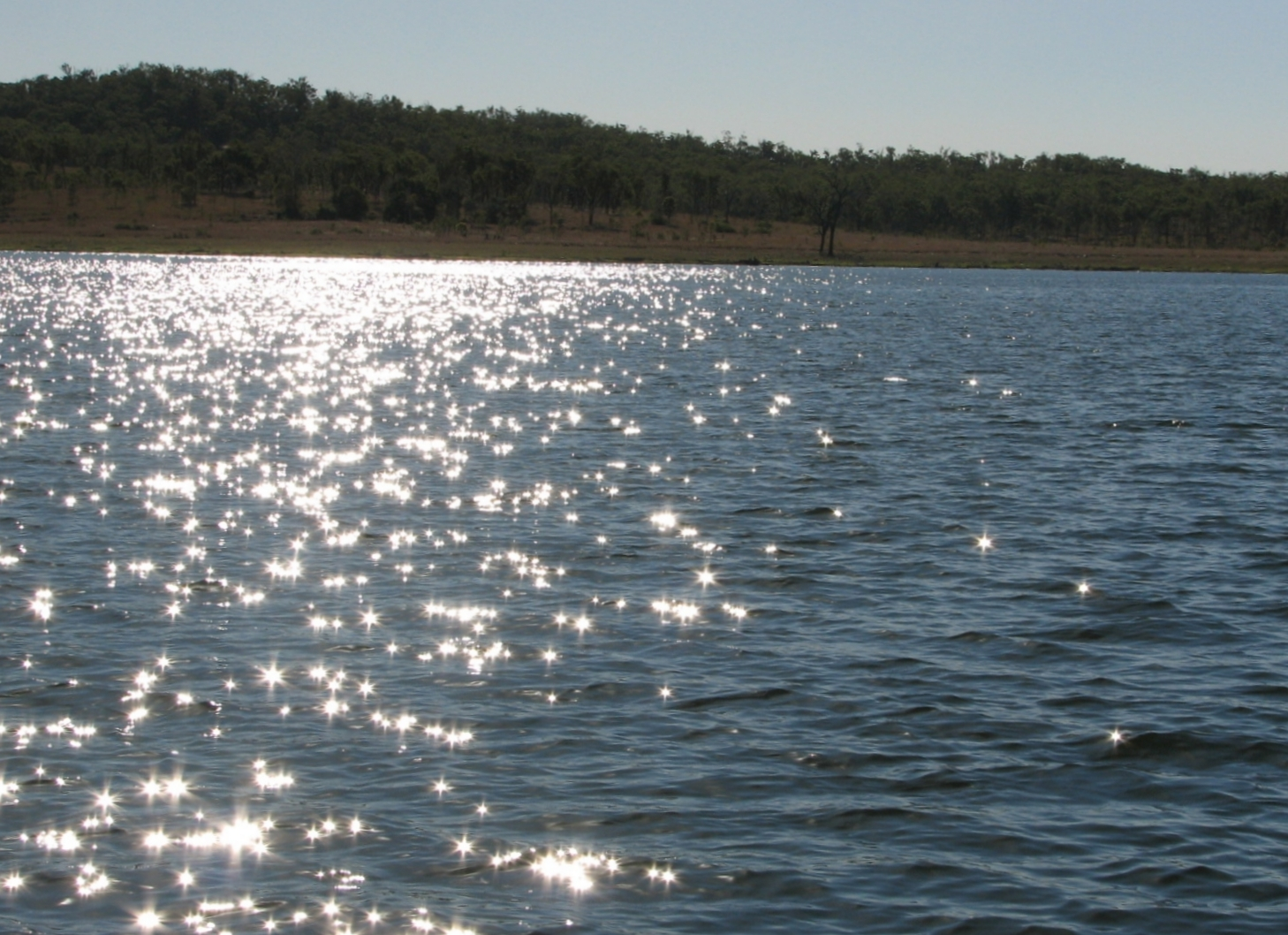
The sun sparkling on the waters of Lake Awoonga

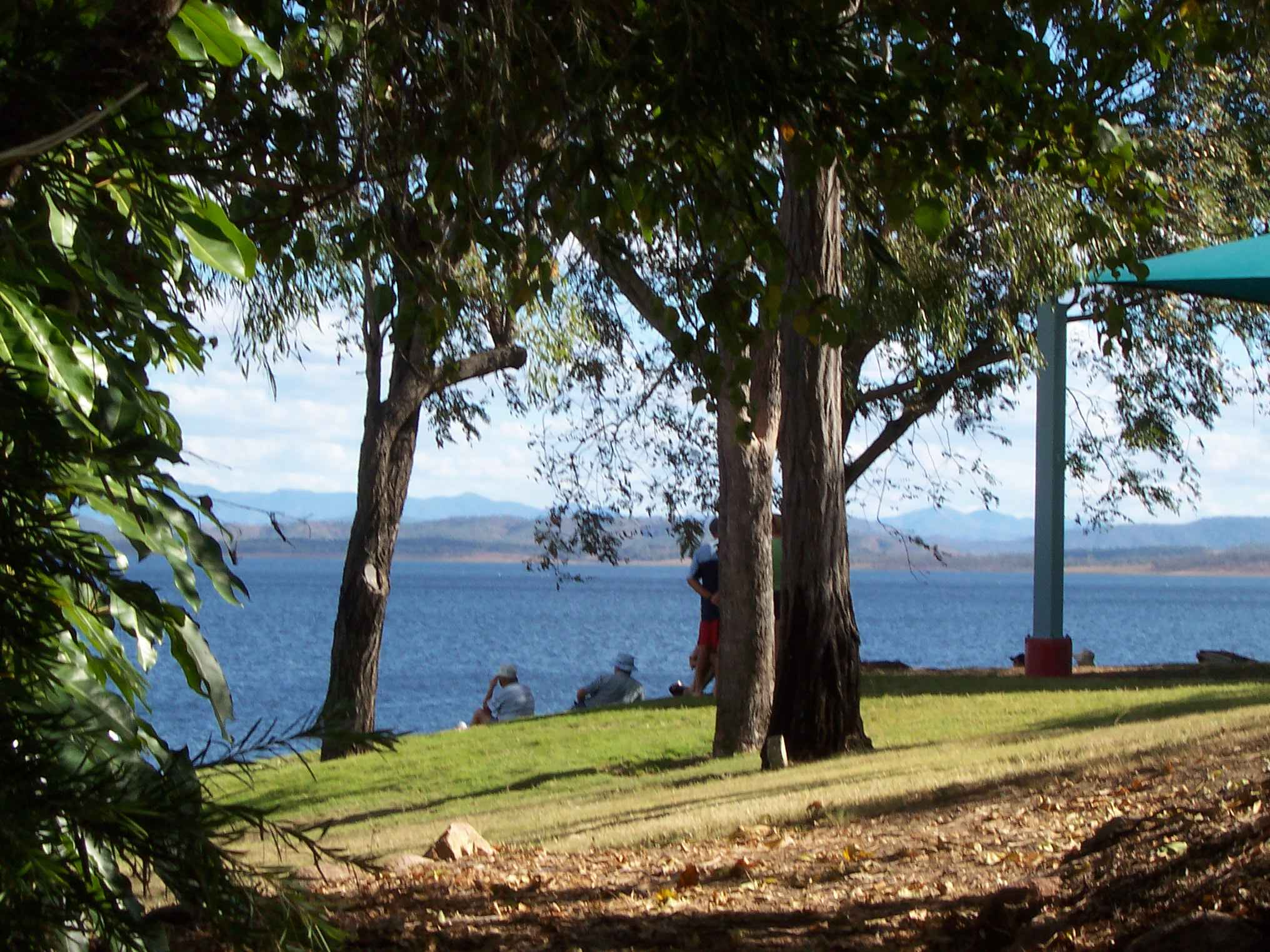
A view of the lake from the recreation area

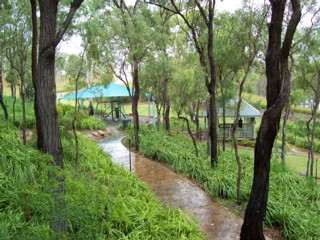
Playground and shelter shed at Ironbark Gully, Lake Awoonga

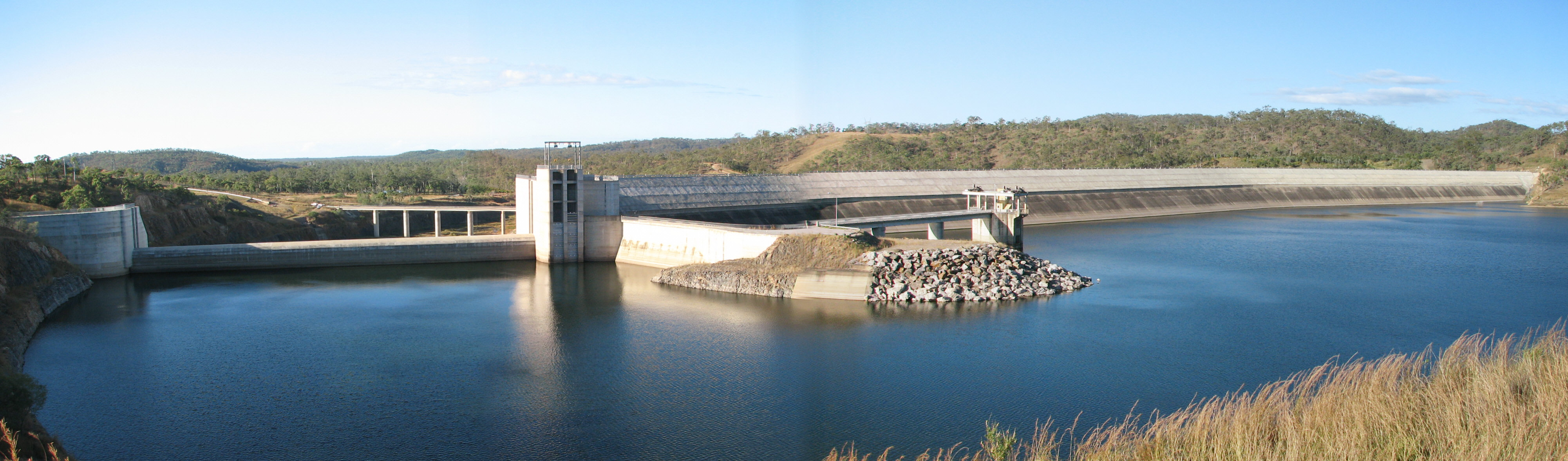
Landscape view of Awoonga Dam and spillway

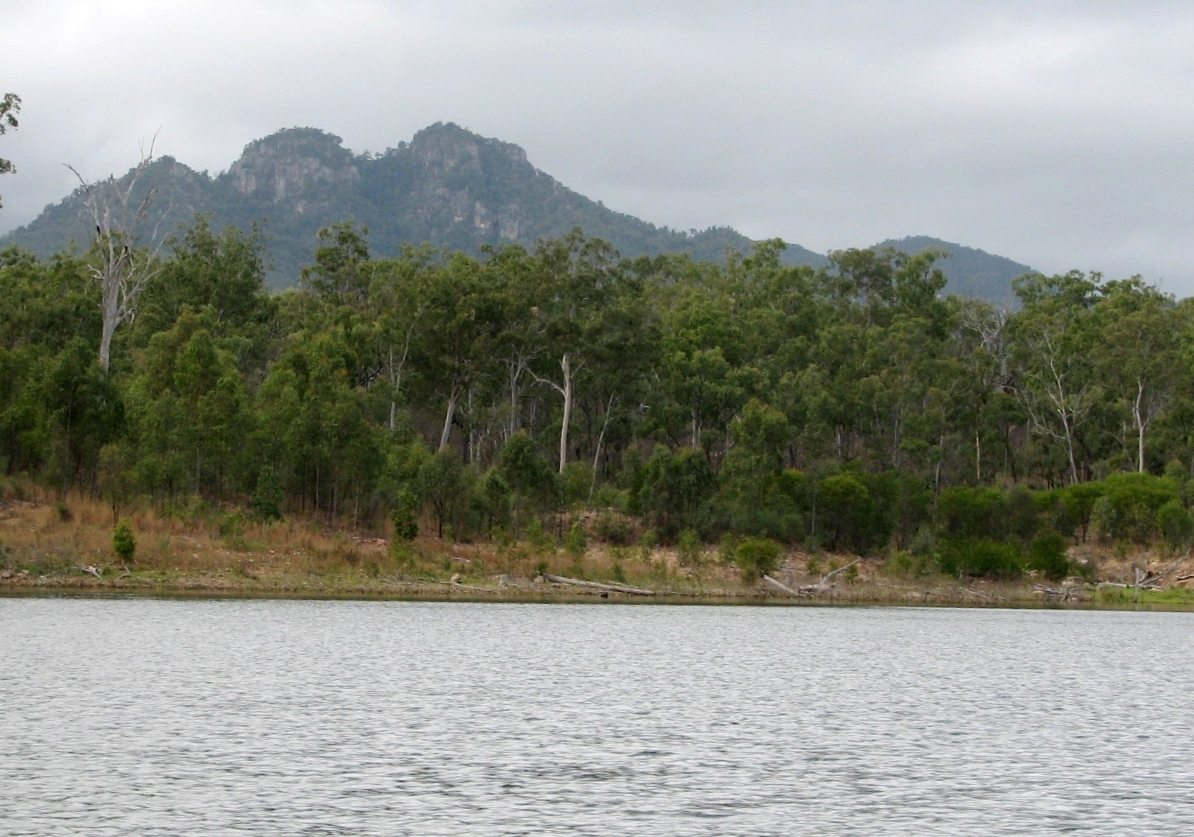
View of Mount Castletower from Lake Awoonga

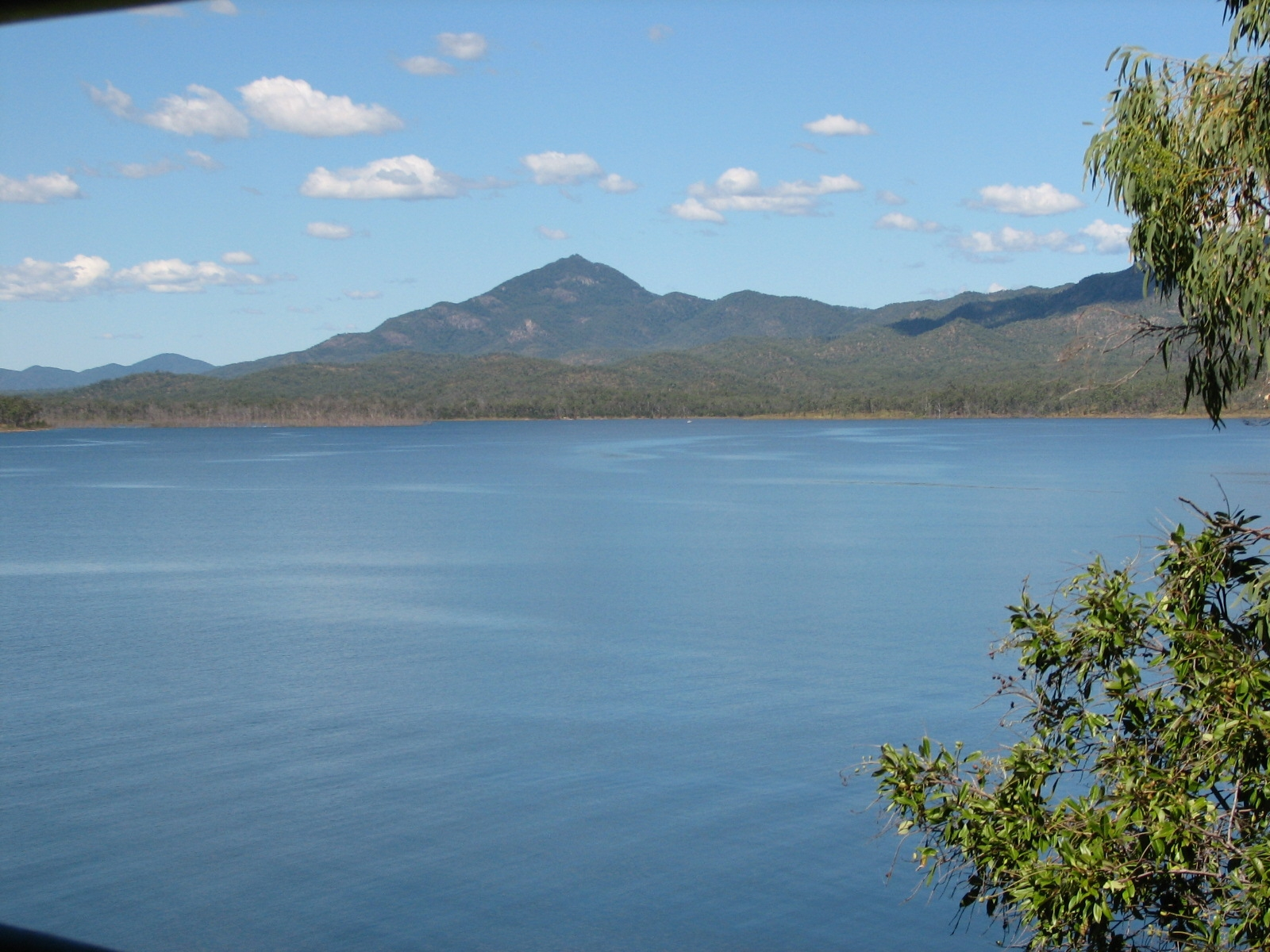
View of Lake Awoonga

== See also ==
- List of dams and reservoirs in Australia
- Boyne Valley, Queensland
- Calliope, Queensland
- Kroombit Tops National Park
- Ubobo, Queensland
- Nagoorin, Queensland
- Builyan, Queensland
- Many Peaks, Queensland
