= Dakenba, Queensland =

Dakenba
- Suburb
- Interactive map of Dakenba
- Coordinates: 24.3411°S 150.505°E
- Country: Australia
- State: Queensland
- LGA: Shire of Banana
- Location: 7.7 km (4.8 mi) N of Biloela; 120 km (75 mi) SW of Gladstone; 136 km (85 mi) S of Rockhampton; 576 km (358 mi) NNW of Brisbane

Government
  - State electorate: Callide
  - Federal division: Flynn

Area
  - Total: 52.9 km^{2} (20.4 sq mi)

Population
  - Total: 127 (2021 census)
  - Density: 2.401/km^{2} (6.218/sq mi)
- Time zone: UTC+10:00 (AEST)
- Postcode: 4715
Suburbs around Dakenba
Callide	Callide	Mount Murchison
Orange Creek	Dakenba	Mount Murchison
Prospect	Biloela	Valentine Plains

Dakenba is a rural locality in the Shire of Banana, Queensland, Australia. In the 2021 census, Dakenba had a population of 127 people.

== Geography ==
The Moura railway line passes from the north-west (Callide) to the east (Mount Murchison). The locality is served by Dakenba railway station (24.3507°S 150.4957°E).

Callide Creek flows from the north-west (Callide) to the south-east (Valentine Plains).

== History ==
Callide Bridge State School opened 10 June 1929, but had a number of name changes in 1929 including Melton and Raeworth before becoming Raedon State School. It closed in 1959. It was at 11 Teys Road (24.3662°S 150.4985°E), now within Biloela but on the locality boundary with Dakenba.

== Demographics ==
In the 2016 census, Dakenba had a population of 116 people.

In the 2021 census, Dakenba had a population of 127 people.

== Education ==
There are no schools in Dakenba. The nearest government primary schools are Mount Murchison State School in neighbouring Mount Murchison to the east and Biloela State School in neighbouring Biloela to the south. The nearest government secondary school is Biloela State High School in neighbouring Biloea to the south.
