= Ribbon weed =

Ribbon weed may refer to:

- Posidonia australis, a species of seagrass found in the ocean off southern Australia
- Stuckenia pectinata (Potamogeton pectinatus), a freshwater plant

== See also ==
- Ribbonleaf pondweed, Potamogeton epihydrus, a freshwater flowering plant
