= Kroombit Tops National Park =

National park in Australia

- IUCN category II (national park)
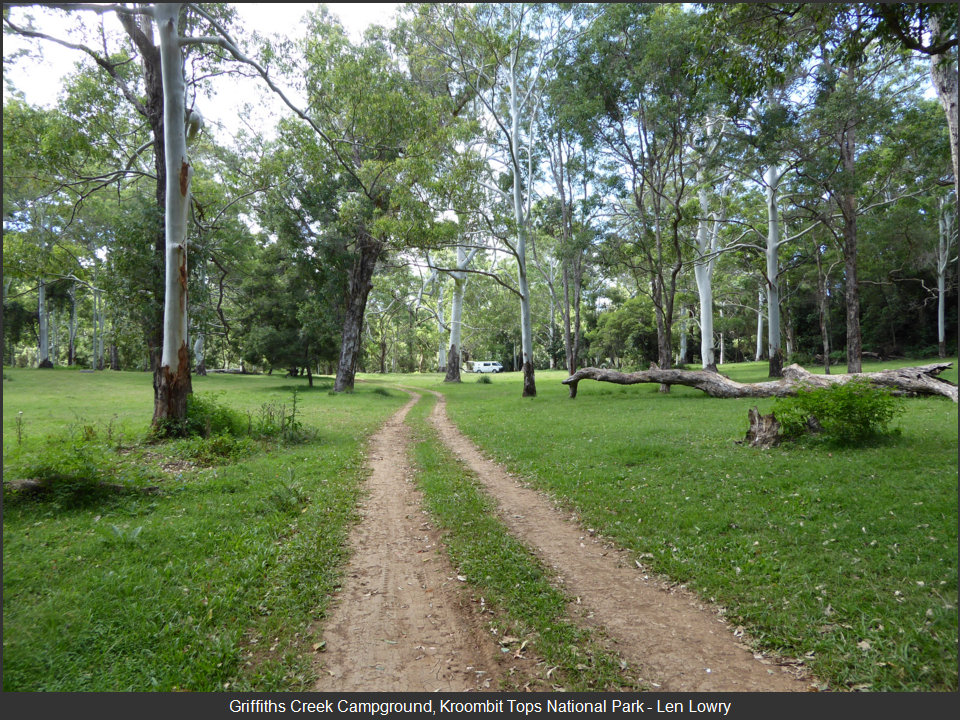
- Griffiths Creek Campground, Kroombit Tops National Park

- Location within Queensland
- Location: Queensland
- Nearest city: Biloela
- Coordinates: 24°24′03″S 150°57′30″E
- Area: 74.6 km^{2} (28.8 sq mi)
- Established: 1974
- Governing body: Queensland Parks and Wildlife Service
- Website: Official website

Kroombit Tops is a national park in Central Queensland, Australia. It is between Monto and Calliope. It is two parts. The largest part is within the localities of Tablelands, Valentine Plains, Cania and Boyne Valley, while the smaller part is in the locality of Mount Alma. It is 399 km northwest of Brisbane. Cania Gorge National Park is located approximately 25 km to the south.

In February 1945, an American Liberator Bomber, "Beautiful Betsy", crashed into what is now Kroombit Tops National Park. The wreckage was discovered on 2 August 1994.

Recreational activities conducted in the park include birdwatching, off-road driving and bushwalking. Camping is permitted.

== Fauna ==
The park provides refuge for the Kroombit tinker frog, which has only been found within the park. The species is so rare that estimates of their number only range in the hundreds; as of November 2020, it was estimated fewer than 200 remained in the wild, all in various discrete areas in the rainforest. However, in the same month, the first froglet of this species was bred in captivity at Currumbin Wildlife Sanctuary, raising hopes that it may be saved from extinction.

In 2013, a new species of marsupial, the silver-headed antechinus, was described, also only found in the national park.

A small population of brumbies roams the park; they are sometimes mustered to reduce numbers.

Abundant in the park is the Kroombit Tops Assassin Spider (Austrarchaea alani).

== Crash site ==
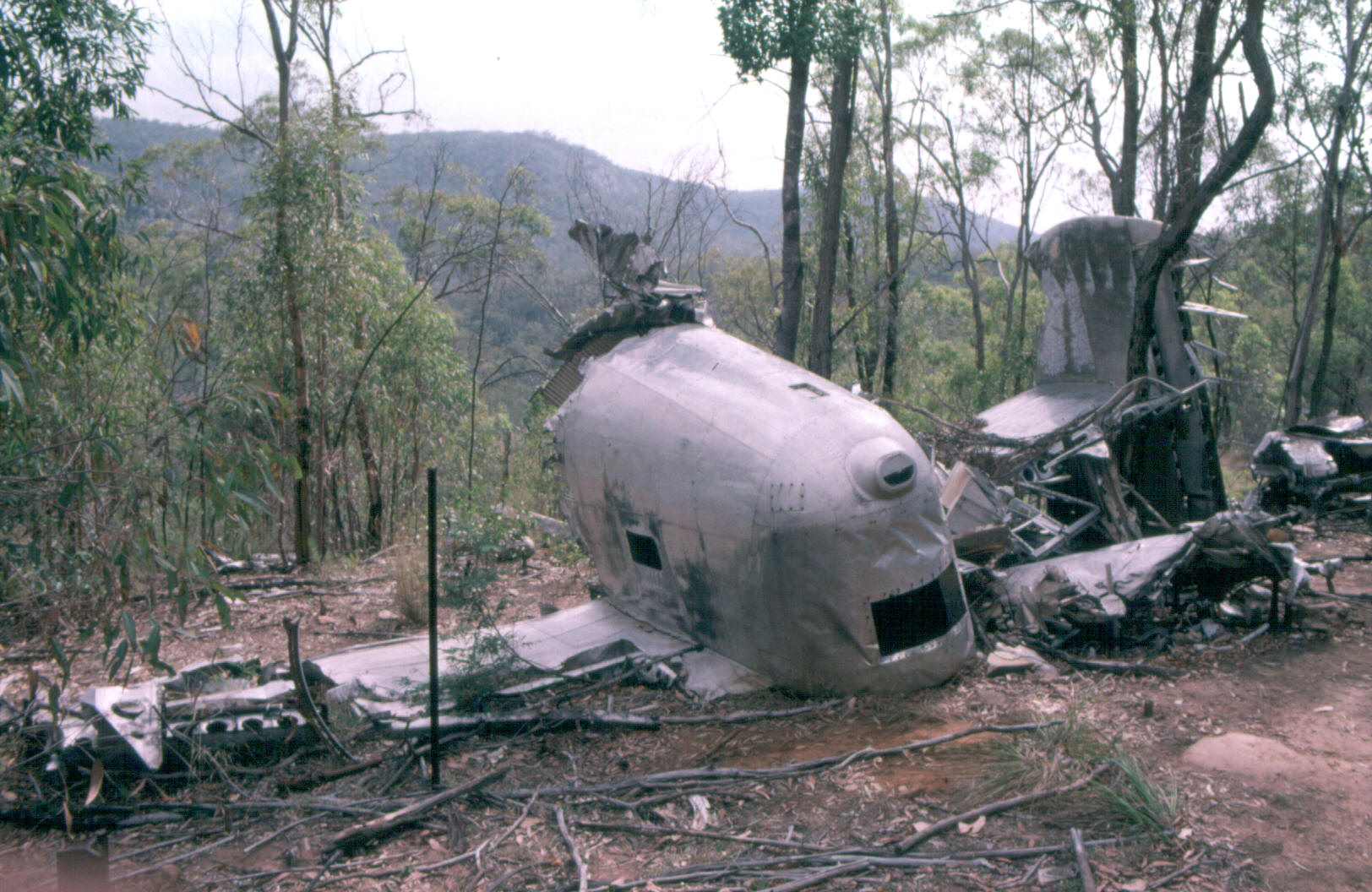
Wreckage of Beautiful Betsy, 2011

On 2 August 1994, the wreckage of a United States Army Air Forces Consolidated B-24D Liberator, Beautiful Betsy, was discovered in the park. The aircraft had gone missing in stormy weather on 26 February 1945 while on a "Fat Cat" run from Darwin to Brisbane – transporting men and supplies as part of a regular flight. Eight servicemen lost their lives; six of the men were American aviators and two were British Royal Air Force Spitfire pilots. The crash site is well-presented, with a plaque erected by National Parks (approx 24.46441°S 150.91426°E).

== See also ==
- Protected areas of Queensland
