= Wooderson, Queensland =

Wooderson
- Suburb
- Interactive map of Wooderson
- Coordinates: 24.1041°S 151.0880°E
- Country: Australia
- State: Queensland
- LGA: Gladstone Region
- Location: 11.7 km (7.3 mi) W of Calliope; 35.7 km (22.2 mi) SW of Gladstone CBD; 125 km (78 mi) SE of Rockhampton; 534 km (332 mi) NNW of Brisbane

Government
  - State electorate: Callide
  - Federal division: Flynn

Area
  - Total: 295.6 km^{2} (114.1 sq mi)

Population
  - Total: 217 (2021 census)
  - Density: 0.7341/km^{2} (1.901/sq mi)
- Time zone: UTC+10:00 (AEST)
- Postcode: 4680
Suburbs around Wooderson
East End	East End	West Stowe
Mount Alma	Wooderson	Calliope
Mount Alma	Diglum	Taragoola

Wooderson is a rural locality in the Gladstone Region, Queensland, Australia. In the 2021 census, Wooderson had a population of 217 people.

== History ==
Wooderson State School opened on 23 August 1945 and closed on 26 February 1960. It was on a 4-acre-32-perch (1.70 ha) site at 306 Wooderson Road (24.1204°S 151.0796°E).

== Demographics ==
In the 2016 census, Wooderson had a population of 188 people.

In the 2021 census, Wooderson had a population of 217 people.

== Education ==
There are no schools in Wooderson. The nearest government primary and secondary schools are Calliope State School and Calliope State High School, both in neighbouring Calliope to the east.
