= Callide, Queensland =

Callide
- Town
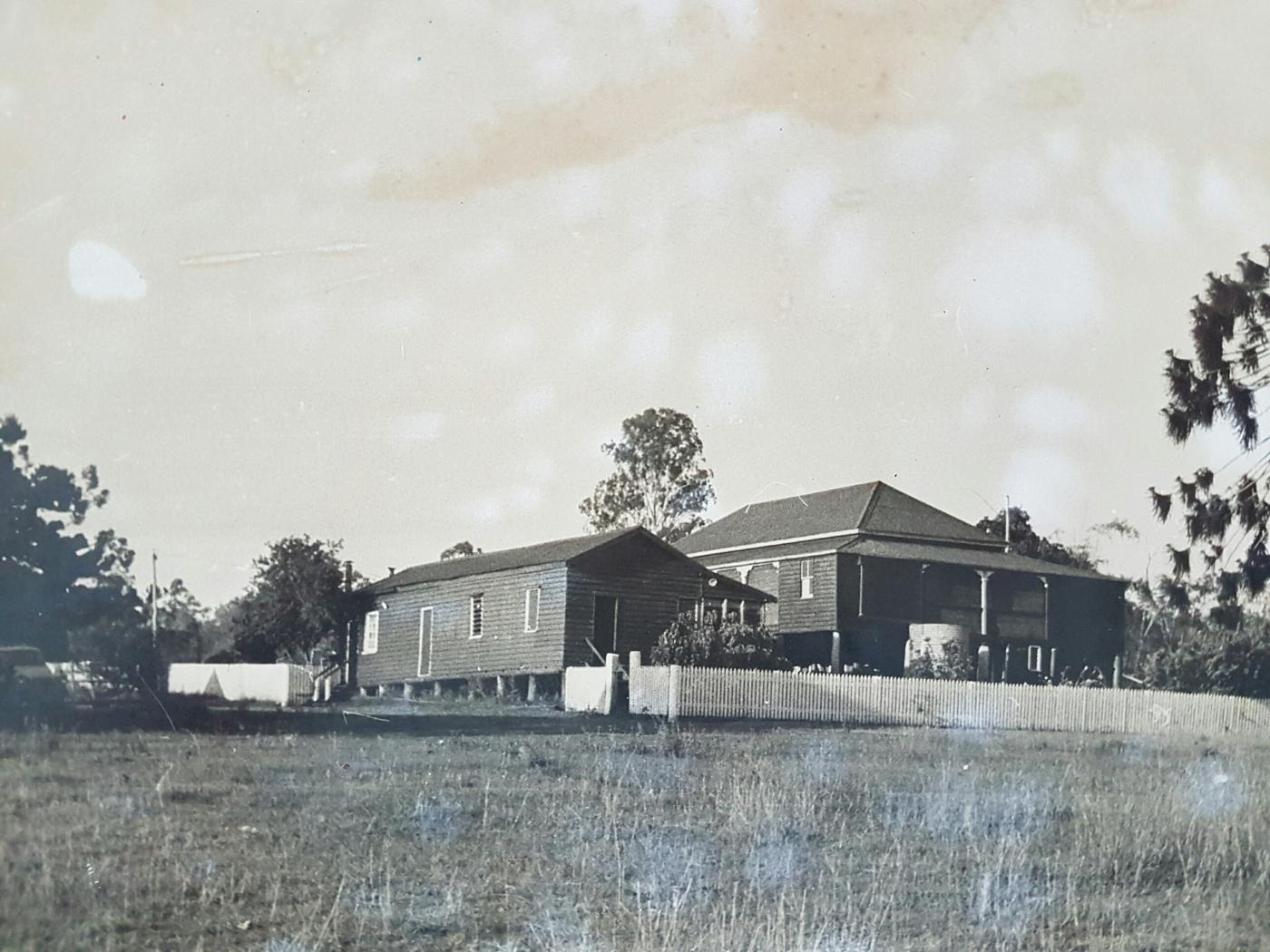
- Kilburnie Homestead, 1950s

- Interactive map of Callide
- Coordinates: 24.3011°S 150.4624°E
- Country: Australia
- State: Queensland
- LGA: Shire of Banana
- Location: 14.8 km (9.2 mi) N of Biloela; 113 km (70 mi) SW of Gladstone; 135 km (84 mi) S of Rockhampton; 548 km (341 mi) NW of Brisbane

Government
  - State electorate: Callide
  - Federal division: Flynn

Area
  - Total: 91.3 km^{2} (35.3 sq mi)

Population
  - Total: 80 (2021 census)
  - Density: 0.88/km^{2} (2.27/sq mi)
- Time zone: UTC+10:00 (AEST)
- Postcode: 4715
Localities around Callide
| Jambin | Jambin | Dumgree |
| Jambin | Callide | Dumgree |
| Orange Creek | Dakenba | Mount Murchison |

Callide is a rural town and locality in the Shire of Banana, Queensland, Australia. In the 2021 census, the locality of Callide had a population of 80 people.

== Geography ==
The Dawson Highway enters the locality from the east (Dumgree) and exits to the south-east (Mount Murchison); it does not pass through or near the town.

The Moura railway line enters the locality from the west (Jambin), passes through the town, and exits the locality to the south (Dakenba). Historically, the town was served by the Callide railway station (24.3018°S 150.4634°E), but it is now abandoned.

The town of Callide is the south-west of the locality on the boundary with Jambin near the railway station. It has had little development.

The land use is a mix of crop growing and grazing on native vegetation.

== History ==
The town takes its name from the creek and pastoral run, originally used by pioneer pastoralist Charles Archer in 1853, who possibly intended to use the Greek word "kalos" meaning good, as a description of the country, which was corrupted to "Calleide" on a later survey.

The Kilburnie Homestead was established in 1885.

Callide Provisional School opened on 24 November 1925. On 1 June 1927, it became Callide State School. It closed in 1971. It was on Callide Road (24.3012°S 150.4588°E). Although it is within the town of Callide, it is within the present-day boundaries of the neighbouring locality of Jambin.

Callide Bridge State School opened 10 June 1929, but had a number of name changes in 1929 including Melton and Raeworth before becoming Raedon State School. It closed in 1959. It was at 11 Teys Road (24.3662°S 150.4985°E), now within Biloela but on the locality boundary with Dakenba.

== Demographics ==
In the 2016 census, the locality of Callide had a population of 86 people.

In the 2021 census, the locality of Callide had a population of 80 people.

== Education ==
There are no schools in Callide. The nearest government primary schools are Mount Murchison State School in neighbouring Mount Murchison to the south-east and Biloela State School in Biloela to the south. The nearest government secondary school is Biloela State High School in Biloela.

== Attractions ==
Kilburnie Homestead at 531 Argoon Kilburnie Road hold a number of open days each year.
