= Mount Murchison, Queensland =

Mount Murchison
- Suburb
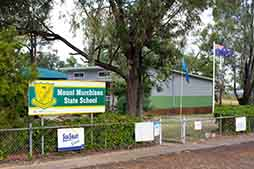
- Mount Murchison State School, 2013

- Interactive map of Mount Murchison
- Coordinates: 24.3358°S 150.5711°E
- Country: Australia
- State: Queensland
- LGA: Shire of Banana
- Location: 9.1 km (5.7 mi) NW of Biloela; 119 km (74 mi) SW of Gladstone; 143 km (89 mi) S of Rockhampton; 566 km (352 mi) NNW of Brisbane

Government
  - State electorate: Callide
  - Federal division: Flynn

Area
  - Total: 76.0 km^{2} (29.3 sq mi)

Population
  - Total: 128 (2021 census)
  - Density: 1.684/km^{2} (4.362/sq mi)
- Time zone: UTC+10:00 (AEST)
- Postcode: 4715
Suburbs around Mount Murchison
Callide	Dumgree	Dumgree
Dakenba	Mount Murchison	Dumgree
Dakenba	Valentine Plains	Valentine Plains

Mount Murchison is a rural locality in the Shire of Banana, Queensland, Australia. In the 2021 census, Mount Murchison had a population of 128 people.

== Geography ==
Callide Power Station is in the south-east of the locality at 1092 Biloela Callide Road (24.3463°S 150.6189°E).

== History ==
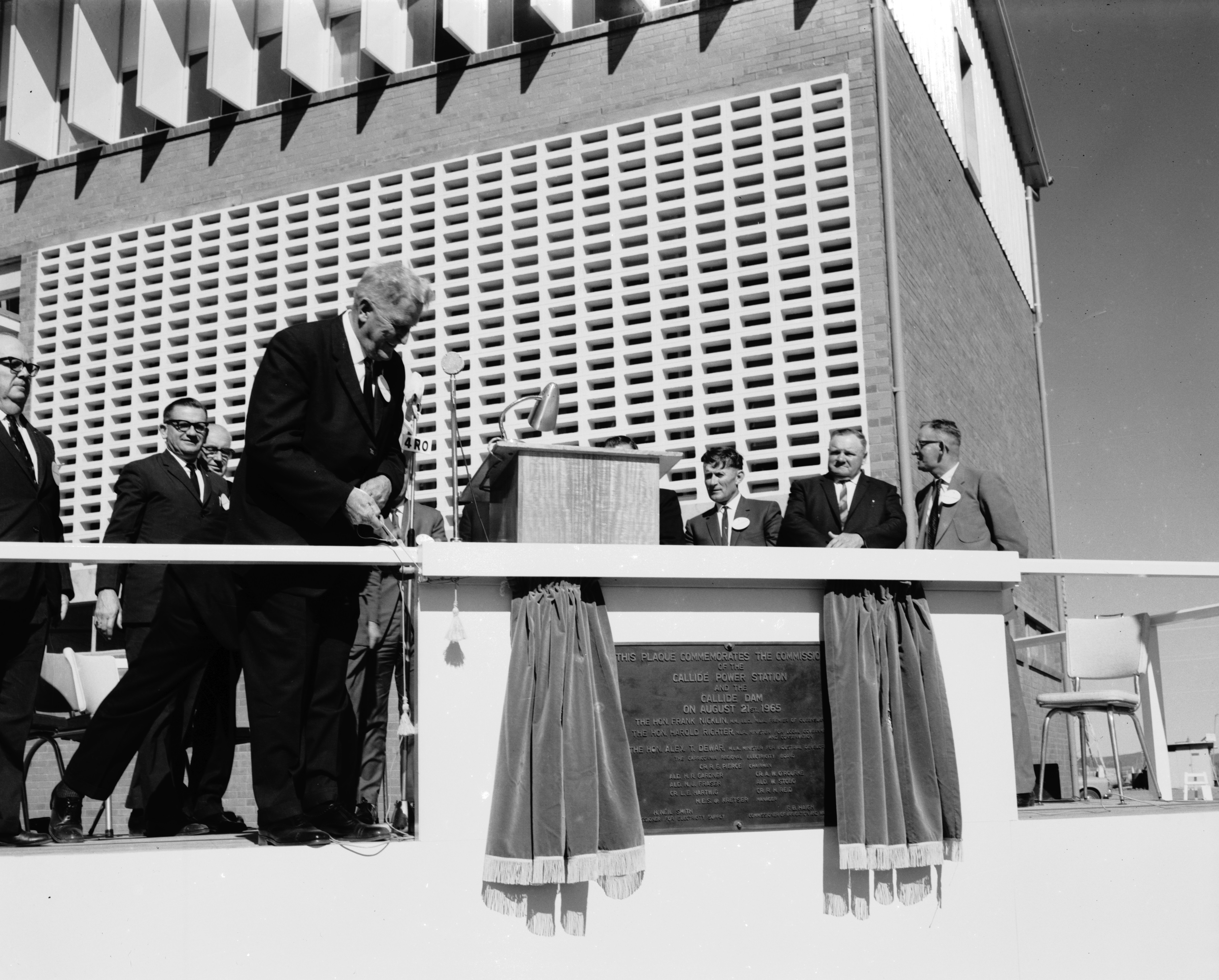
Premier Frank Nicklin opening Callide Power Station, 21 August 1965

Mount Murchison State School opened on 24 April 1935. The new school was built to cater for up to 24 students with a single 18x18 foot classroom with 8 foot verandas front and rear; it was a timber building with a galvanised iron roof and was built on the property of Mr C. G. Skinner. The teacher was Reg Davidson.

Callide Power Station commenced operation in 1965. It was officially opened by Queensland Premier Frank Nicklin on 21 August 1965.

The mobile library service commenced in 2004.

On 25 May 2021, an explosion and subsequent fire at Callide Power Station caused a significant power outage that affected over 375,000 premises.

== Demographics ==
In the 2011 census, Mount Murchison had a population of 226 people.

In the 2016 census, Mount Murchison had a population of 149 people.

In the 2021 census, Mount Murchison had a population of 128 people.

== Economy ==
Callide Power Station is a coal-powered electricity generator with eight steam turbines with a combined generation capacity of 1,720 megawatts (MW) of electricity. As of 2018, generation capacity was 1510 MW.

== Education ==
Mount Murchison State School is a government primary (Prep-6) school for boys and girls at Lot 137 Dawson Highway (24.3338°S 150.5379°E). In 2013, the school had 16 students in a single multi-age class with one teacher. In 2018, the school had an enrolment of 33 students with 3 teachers and 6 non-teaching staff (2 full-time equivalent).

There are no secondary schools in Mount Murchison. The nearest government secondary school is Biloela State High School in Biloela to the south-west.

== Amenities ==
Banana Shire Council operate a fortnightly mobile library service to the school.

Biloela Dirt Riders operate the Stoneyridge Raceway on Cocups Road (24.3567°S 150.6219°E).
