= Moura railway line =

Railway line in Queensland, Australia

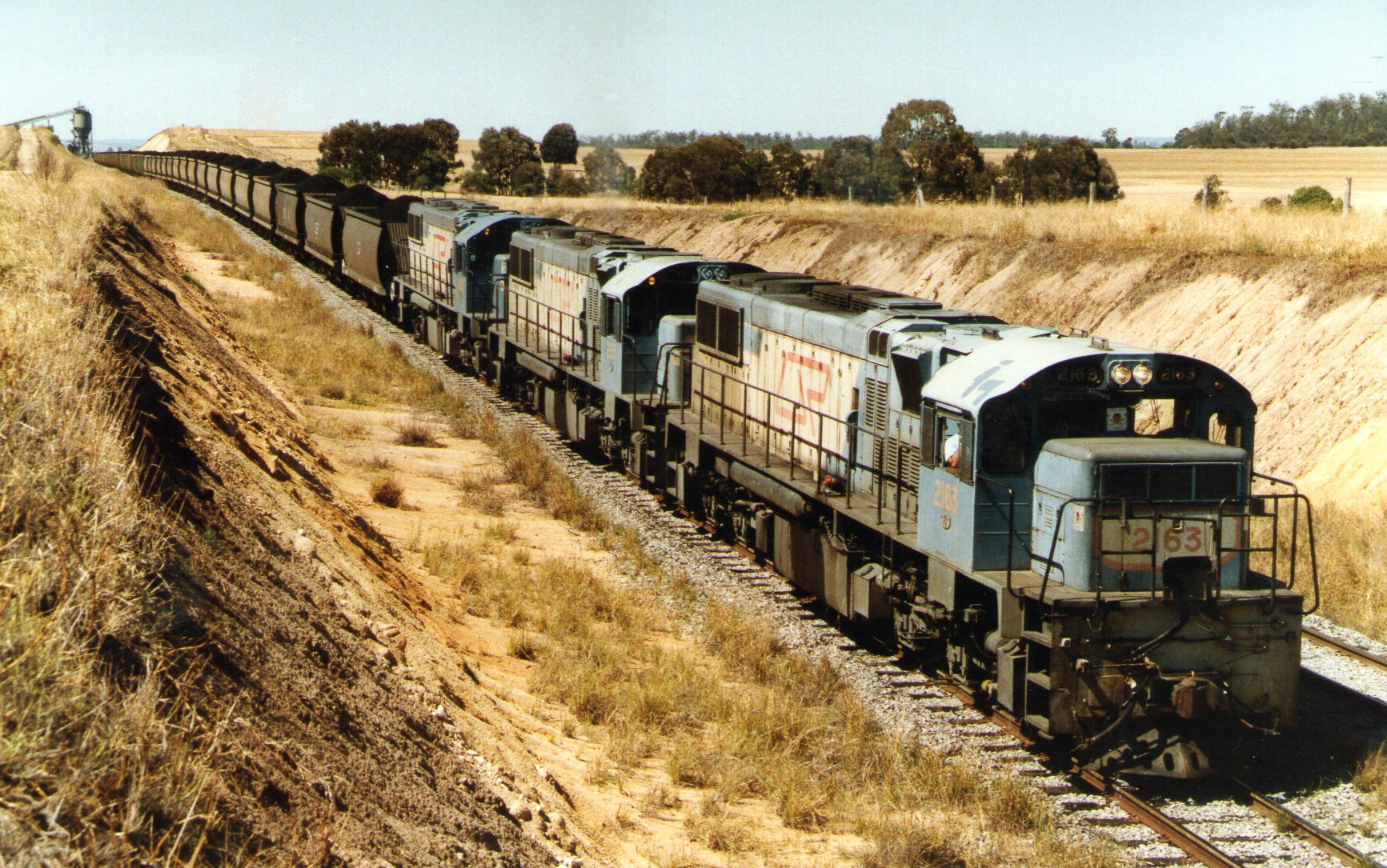
QR loco 2163 and two others haul a coal train away from Boundary Hill loading loop (c. 1991)

The Moura railway line is a railway in central Queensland, connecting several coal mines to the port of Gladstone. It connects the remnants of several lines that previously connected to Rockhampton, originally by a rack railway.

== History ==
The Dawson Valley railway line was built from near Rockhampton, opening in 1898, and the Callide Valley railway line opened in 1917, both having a north–south alignment. In 1953, a spur line opened to serve the Callide Mine, and another to serve the Moura coal mine opened in 1963, both mines shipping coal to Gladstone via Rockhampton, a ~270 km distance. As coal volumes grew a direct line to Gladstone was proposed, and the 151 km Moura Short Line opened in 1968, being the first 'S' (Special) class line in Queensland, with an 18 tonne axle load at the time. It commenced at Graham railway station (in Calliope) on the Monto line, connecting to the Callide Valley line (and the Callide Coalfields) at Earlsfield railway station (in Jambin), and connecting to the Dawson Valley line at Moura Mine Junction, 12 km east of the town of Moura.

Before the Moura Short Line opened, the largest QR steam locomotive, known as a Garratt, could haul a 750-ton coal load to Gladstone via Rockhampton. After the line opened, triple headed diesel hauled trains took 4000 ton coal loads direct to Gladstone.

=== System realignment ===
Additional coal mines were developed in the area, and a 5.6 km line from Annandale to Boundary Hill Mine opened in 1983. A balloon loop and 5.6 km connecting line was opened at Moura Mine in 1994.

As Gladstone is the major port for central Queensland, the majority of freight began to be railed via the new direct line, and the 69 km Kabra-Wowan and 47 km Baralaba-Moura sections of the Dawson Valley line closed in 1987, effectively shifting the network to an east–west alignment.

Further sections subsequently closed such as Thangool-Biloela (11 km) in 1988, Goolara-Theodore (5 km) in 1993, Wowan-Rannes (25 km) and Kooemba-Baralaba (12 km) in 1995, Rannes-Kooemba (25 km) in 1997 and Rannes - Koorngoo (24 km) in 1999.

On 26 June 2013 the Earlsfield-Koorngoo, Dakenba-Biloela and Moura-Goolara sections were closed, leaving the system as a 192 km line from Graham to Moura, with a 29 km branch to Callide Coalfields and ~3 km balloon loops at the Boundary Hill and Moura mines.

=== Present system ===
Today coal is the main freight hauled on the Moura line, with grain from the silos at Moura being significant, if seasonal, traffic. The line from Dakenbah to Biloela has been removed.

The Moura line as far as the Moura balloon loop features 60 kg/m rail on concrete sleepers, a 26.5 tonne axle load, maximum grade of 1 in 63 (~1.6%) eastbound (1 in 50 (2%) westbound), 300m minimum radius curves and a line speed of 80 km/h except for the 10 km section crossing the Calliope Range, which has a 40 km/h speed limit. Beyond that the line has 30 kg/m rail, a 15.75 tonne axle load and a 40 km/h speed limit.

The section from Earlsfield to Callide Coalfields via Dakenba features 53 kg/m rail, a 26.5 tonne axle load and curves with a minimum radius of 160m.

== Proposed southern connection ==
A major coal mine is proposed at Wandoan, with coal to be shipped from Gladstone via the proposed Surat Basin railway, which would connect to the Moura line south of the town of Banana. This proposed line would be well east of Taroom, and pass close to the gold mining town of Cracow.

== See also ==
- Rail transport in Queensland
