= List of schools in Central Queensland =

This is a list of schools in the Central Queensland region of Queensland, Australia, and includes schools in Central West Queensland. The region is centred on the coastal cities of Rockhampton and Gladstone, and the inland towns of Emerald, Longreach and Barcaldine. It includes the following local government areas:

- Shire of Banana
- Shire of Barcaldine
- Shire of Barcoo
- Blackall-Tambo Region
- Shire of Boulia
- Central Highlands Region
- Shire of Diamantina
- Gladstone Region
- Isaac Region
- Shire of Livingstone
- Shire of Longreach
- Rockhampton Region
- Aboriginal Shire of Woorabinda
- Shire of Winton

Prior to 2015, the Queensland education system consisted of primary schools, which accommodated students from Kindergarten to Year 7 (ages 5–13), and high schools, which accommodate students from Years 8 to 12 (ages 12–18). However, from 2015, Year 7 became the first year of high school.

== State schools ==
=== State primary schools ===
Name	Suburb	LGA	Opened	Coords	Notes
Agnes Water State School	Agnes Water	Gladstone	1990	24.2143°S 151.9102°E	At 1 Donohue Drive.
Allenstown State School	Allenstown	Rockhampton	1877	23.3919°S 150.5026°E	13–33 Upper Dawson Road. Listed on the Queensland Heritage Register.
Alpha State School	Alpha	Barcaldine	1886	23.6507°S 146.6422°E	At 11 Milton Street.
Ambrose State School	Ambrose	Gladstone	1914	23.7864°S 150.9218°E	At 39 Gentle Annie Road
Anakie State School	Anakie Siding	Central Highlands	1885	23.5540°S 147.7458°E	At 1 School Lane
Aramac State School	Aramac	Barcaldine	1878	22.9744°S 145.2426°E	At 69 Porter Street. Listed on the Queensland Heritage Register.
Arcadia Valley State School	Arcadia Valley	Central Highlands	1975	25.2550°S 148.8208°E	At 4831 Arcadia Valley Road
Bajool State School	Bajool	Rockhampton	1888	23.6523°S 150.6467°E	At54–60 Toonda Street
Banana State School	Banana	Banana	1871	24.469134°S 150.131069°E	At 32–36 Bramston Street.
Baralaba State School	Baralaba	Banana	1918	24.1810°S 149.8097°E	P–10. At 1 Power Street.
Bauhinia State School	Bauhinia	Central Highlands	1967	24.5666°S 149.2960°E	At 11559 Fitzroy Development Road
Bedourie State School	Bedourie	Diamantina	1960	24.3603°S 139.4713°E	At 3 Timor Street
Benaraby State School	Benaraby	Gladstone	1886	24.0037°S 151.3238°E	At 17 O'Connor Road
Berserker Street State School	Berserker	Rockhampton	1917	23.3654°S 150.5299°E	128–140 Berserker Street. Separate Infants' School 1957–1994. Listed on the Queensland Heritage Register.
Biloela State School	Biloela	Banana	1925	24.3983°S 150.5161°E	At 48 Rainbow Street.
Birdsville State School	Birdsville	Diamantina	1899	25.8984°S 139.3527°E	At 54 Adelaide Street.
Blackwater North State School	Blackwater	Central Highlands	1979	23.5662°S 148.8864°E	Early Childhood-6. At 20 Park Street (corner of William Street).
Blackwater State School	Blackwater	Central Highlands	1877	23.5834°S 148.8778°E	At 11 Wey Street.
Bluff State School	Bluff	Central Highlands	1907		
Bororen State School	Bororen	Gladstone	1900		
Bouldercombe State School	Bouldercombe	Rockhampton	1871	23.5641°S 150.4717°E	At 52599 Burnett Highway.
Boulia State School	Boulia	Boulia	1889		
Boyne Island State School	Boyne Island	Gladstone	1953	23.9501°S 151.3564°E	At 151 Malpas Street.
Builyan State School	Builyan	Gladstone	1922		
Byfield State School	Byfield	Livingstone	1923	22.8412°S 150.6461°E	At 2233 Byfield Road.
Calliope State School	Calliope	Gladstone	1872	24.0048°S 151.2029°E	At 14 Stirrat Street.
Capella State School	Capella	Central Highlands	1883	23.0826°S 148.0247°E	At 41 Huntley Street.
Carmila State School	Carmila	Isaac	1923	21.9135°S 149.4035°E	At 6A Carmila West Road.
Cawarral State School	Cawarral	Livingstone	1874	23.2539°S 150.6756°E	At 125 Annie Drive.
Clarke Creek State School	Clarke Creek	Isaac	1971	22.6365°S 149.2529°E	At 44 May Downs Road.
Clermont State School	Clermont	Isaac	1867	22.8365°S 147.6321°E	On Hetherington Street.
Clinton State School	Clinton	Gladstone	1974		
Comet State School	Comet	Central Highlands	1877		
Coowonga State School	Coowonga	Livingstone	1897		
Coppabella State School	Coppabella	Isaac	1980		
Crescent Lagoon State School	West Rockhampton	Rockhampton	1896		
Denison State School	Emerald	Central Highlands	1997	23.5322°S 148.1512°E	16 Gray Street
Depot Hill State School	Depot Hill	Rockhampton	1920	23.3959°S 150.5176°E	At 53–63 O'Connell Street.
Dingo State School	Dingo	Central Highlands	1876	23.6455°S 149.3302°E	On the corner of Kennedy and Normanby Streets.
Duaringa State School	Duaringa	Central Highlands	1879	23.71590°S 149.66848°E	At 3 Charlotte Street.
Dysart State School	Dysart	Isaac	1973	22.5877°S 148.3475°E	At 4 Garnham Drive.
Emerald North State School	Emerald	Central Highlands	1980	23.5132°S 148.1641°E	On Campbell Street.
Emerald State School	Emerald	Central Highlands	1879	23.5237°S 148.1605°E	On the eastern corner of Anakie Street and School Lane.
Emu Park State School	Emu Park	Livingstone	1890	23.2597°S 150.8207°E	At 26 Fountain Street.
Farnborough State School	Farnborough	Livingstone	1903	23.0763°S 150.7371°E	At 8 Hinz Avenue.
Frenchville State School	Frenchville	Rockhampton	1900		
Gindie State School	Gindie	Central Highlands	1897–1965		Gindie Provisional School (also known as Gindie Siding Provisional School) opened 12 November 1897 with 25 students under head teacher Miss Mary E. Hamilton. It became Gindie State School on 1 January 1909. The school closed in 1949 but later reopened.
Gindie State School	Gindie	Central Highlands	1965-	23.7242°S 148.1408°E	In 1965, the school moved to a new site using a demountable building until a permanent building was completed in 1970. Now at 14 Old Cullen-la-ringo Road (corner of Gregory Highway).
Gladstone Central State School	Gladstone Central	Gladstone	1861		
Gladstone South State School	South Gladstone	Gladstone	1898		
Gladstone West State School	West Gladstone	Gladstone	1966		
Glenmore State School	Kawana	Rockhampton	1889	23.3372°S 150.5148°E	At 241–259 Farm Street.
Gogango State School	Gogango	Rockhampton	1974	23.6647°S 150.0444°E	10 Wills Street
Goovigen State School	Goovigen	Banana	1926		
Gracemere State School	Gracemere	Rockhampton	1871	23.4351°S 150.4539°E	At 1A O'Shanesy Street.
Ilfracombe State School	Ilfracombe	Longreach	1893	23.4890°S 144.5046°E	At 20 McMaster Drive
Isisford State School	Isisford	Longreach	1881	24.2602°S 144.4395°E	At 14 St Helena Street.
Jambin State School	Jambin	Banana	1929	24.1738°S 150.3751°E	At 25 Jambin Three Ways Road, adjacent to the Burnett Highway.
Jericho State School	Jericho	Barcaldine	1888		
Jundah State School	Jundah	Barcoo	1900		
Keppel Sands State School	Keppel Sands	Livingstone	1893	23.3276°S 150.7863°E	At 1325 Keppel Sands Road.
Kilcummin State School	Kilcummin	Isaac	1959		
Kin Kora State School	Kin Kora	Gladstone	1981		Earlier school closed 1963
Lakes Creek State School	Lakes Creek	Rockhampton	1872–1894		On 14 September 1871, residents of the area who were mostly employees of the Central Queensland Meat Preserving Company held a meeting to establish a school in the area at which it was estimated that 25 children would attend the school if established. Although the building was completed in January 1872, Lakes Creek Provisional School did not open until 1 October 1872 but closed in 1874, reopening on 21 May 1877. In July 1894, the Queensland Government decided that the numbers of students in the area warranted a state school.
Lakes Creek State School	Lakes Creek	Rockhampton	1895-	23.3759°S 150.5600°E	In January 1895, Lakes Creek State School opened on the present site at 445 Paterson Street. The growth of the school over the years has resulted in increased land and buildings.
Lochington State School	Lochington	Central Highlands	1961	23.9435°S 147.5253°E	At the Lochington pastoral homestead at 101 Lochington Access Road.
Longreach State School	Longreach	Longreach	1893		
Lowmead State School	Lowmead	Gladstone	1908		Closed 1975–1978
Marlborough State School	Marlborough	Livingstone	1917	22.8118°S 149.8950°E	At 79 Magog Road
Marmor State School	Marmor	Rockhampton	1906		
Milman State School	Milman	Livingstone	1913		
Miriam Vale State School	Miriam Vale	Gladstone	1897	24.3297°S 151.5616°E	P–10. At 15 Roe Street.
Mistake Creek State School	Mistake Creek (now within Clermont)	Isaac	1983	22.9889°S 147.0833°E	At 6652 Alpha Road.
Moranbah East State School	Moranbah	Isaac	1981		
Moranbah State School	Moranbah	Isaac	1971		
Mount Archer State School	Koongal	Rockhampton	1982	23.3581°S 150.5456°E	242 Thozet Road
Mount Larcom State School	Mount Larcom	Gladstone	1882		P–10
Mount Morgan Central State School	Mount Morgan	Rockhampton	1887		Listed on the Queensland Heritage Register
Mount Murchison State School	Mount Murchison	Banana	1935		
Moura State School	Moura	Banana	1940		
Muttaburra State School	Muttaburra	Barcaldine	1884		
Nagoorin State School	Nagoorin	Gladstone	1915	24.3516°S 151.2999°E	At 2 Ubobo Street.
Nebo State School	Nebo	Isaac	1874	21.6897°S 148.6898°E	At 34 Oxford Street.
Orion State School	Orion	Central Highlands	1964	24.2303°S 148.4107°E	At 1002 Ten Chain Road.
Park Avenue State School	Park Avenue	Rockhampton	1901	23.3593°S 150.5071°E	At 5–13 Main Street.
Parkhurst State School	Parkhurst	Rockhampton	1900	23.2958°S 150.5137°E	At 11 Mason Avenue.
Port Curtis Road State School	Port Curtis	Rockhampton	1875		
Prospect Creek State School	Prospect	Banana	1935	24.4211°S 150.4293°E	Originally opened as Torsdale Farm Provisional School. Changed name in 1944. Located at 12935 Dawson Highway.
Ridgelands State School	Ridgelands	Rockhampton	1921	23.2497°S 150.2799°E	At 43 Dalma-Ridgelands Road.
Rolleston State School	Rolleston	Central Highlands	1871	24.4624°S 148.6240°E	At 16 Warrijo Street.
Springsure State School	Springsure	Central Highlands	1870	24.1157°S 148.0885°E	Prep–10 school at 55 Eclipse Street.
St Lawrence State School	St Lawrence	Isaac	1871	22.3449°S 149.5297°E	At 6 Macartney Street.
Stanwell State School	Stanwell	Rockhampton	1873	23.4852°S 150.3215°E	At 10 Teakle Street.
Stonehenge State School	Stonehenge	Barcoo	1900		
Tambo State School	Tambo	Blackall-Tambo	1876	24.8845°S 146.2537°E	Early Childhood - Year 10. 20 Mitchell Street.
Tannum Sands State School	Tannum Sands	Gladstone	1983	23.9509°S 151.3648°E	At 22 Waratah Crescent.
Taranganba State School	Taranganba	Livingstone	1993	23.1546°S 150.7542°E	Taranganba Road.
Taroom State School	Taroom	Banana	1871	25.6389°S 149.8005°E	Prep-10. In Wolsey Street.
Thangool State School	Thangool	Banana	1927	24.4910°S 150.5716°E	At 2 Aerodrome Road.
The Caves State School	The Caves	Livingstone	1904	23.1767°S 150.4593°E	Located at 1 Barmoya Road.
The Hall State School	Wandal	Rockhampton	1910		Girls' and Infants' until 1986
Theodore State School	Theodore	Banana	1924	24.9460°S 150.0750°E	Prep-10. On The Boulevard.
Tieri State School	Tieri	Central Highlands	1983	23.0304°S 148.3441°E	1 Bottlebrush Lane
Tresswell State School	Nandowrie	Central Highlands	1971–1974		On the pastoral property "Tresswell".
Tresswell State School	Nandowrie	Central Highlands	1974-	24.2479°S 147.6065°E	At 5469 Dawson Developmental Road (also known as Tambo Road).
Ubobo State School	Ubobo	Gladstone	1927	24.4067°S 151.3217°E	In Cedarvale Road. In 2017, the school had an enrolment of 12 students with 3 teachers (2 full-time equivalent) and 4 non-teaching staff (2 full-time equivalent). While officially open, since 2019, the school has not been operating as no students are enrolled.
Urandangi State School	Urandangi	Boulia	1994	21.5962°S 138.3359°E	On the Urandangi North Road.
Valkyrie State School	Valkyrie	Isaac	1974	22.0594°S 148.5794°E	Early Childhood- Year 6. At 43092 Fitzroy Developmental Road.
Waraburra State School	Gracemere	Rockhampton	1987	23.4481°S 150.4526°E	At 55 Johnson Road.
Wartburg State School	Wartburg, in Baffle Creek	Gladstone	1913	24.5024°S 151.9309°E	Early Childhood - Year 6. At 585 Coast Road.
Westwood State School	Westwood	Rockhampton	1872		
Windorah State School	Windorah	Barcoo	1888		
Woorabinda State School	Woorabinda	Woorabinda	1928	24.1365°S 149.4561°E	On Carbine Street.
Wowan State School	Wowan	Banana	1900	23.9104°S 150.1938°E	On Don Street.
Yarwun State School	Yarwun	Gladstone	1906	23.8467°S 151.1260°E	At 35 Butler Street.
Yeppoon State School	Yeppoon	Livingstone	1885–1957	23.1299°S 150.7461°E	At 29 Queen Street, listed on the Queensland Heritage Register as Yeppoon State School building.
Yeppoon State School	Yeppoon	Livingstone	1957	23.1253°S 150.7379°E	At 14–16 Tucker Street, also listed on the Queensland Heritage Register as Yeppoon State School.

=== State high schools and colleges ===
Name	Suburb	LGA	Opened	Coordinates	Notes
Barcaldine State School	Barcaldine	Barcaldine	1887		P–12
Biloela State High School	Biloela	Banana	1963		
Blackall State School	Blackall	Blackall-Tambo	1877		P–12
Blackwater State High School	Blackwater	Central Highlands	1973	23.5724°S 148.8827°E	At 26 Elm Street.
Calliope State High School	Calliope	Gladstone	2020		
Capella State High School	Capella	Central Highlands	1989	23.0881°S 148.0304°E	At 35–45 Gordon Street.
Clermont State High School	Clermont	Isaac	1990	22.8277°S 147.6389°E	At 1 Kitchener Street.
Dysart State High School	Dysart	Isaac	1982	22.5840°S 148.3548°E	On Edgerley Street.
Emerald State High School	Emerald	Central Highlands	1969	23.5136°S 148.1582°E	On Old Airport Drive.
Gladstone State High School	West Gladstone	Gladstone	1953		
Glenden State School	Glenden	Isaac	1982		P–12
Glenmore State High School	Kawana	Rockhampton	1975	23.3363°S 150.5167°E	On the corner of the Bruce Highway and Farm Street.
Longreach State High School	Longreach	Longreach	1966		
Middlemount Community School	Middlemount	Isaac	2001		P–12
Moranbah State High School	Moranbah	Isaac	1976		
Mount Morgan State High School	Mount Morgan	Rockhampton	1912		Listed on the Queensland Heritage Register
Moura State High School	Moura	Banana	1976		
North Rockhampton State High School	Frenchville	Rockhampton	1956	23.3521°S 150.5316°E	At 302–328 Berserker Street.
Rockhampton State High School	Wandal	Rockhampton	1919		
Rosedale State School	Rosedale	Gladstone	1896		P–12
Tannum Sands State High School	Tannum Sands	Gladstone	1998	23.9596°S 151.3643°E	At 65 Coronation Drive.
Toolooa State High School	Toolooa	Gladstone	1981		
Winton State School	Winton	Winton	1885	22.3856°S 143.0387°E	P–12. At 71 Cork Street.
Yeppoon State High School	Yeppoon	Livingstone	1969	23.1349°S 150.7355°E	30 Rawlings Street.

=== Other state schools ===
This includes special schools (schools for disabled children) and schools for specific purposes.

Name	Suburb	LGA	Opened	Coords	Notes
Capricornia School of Distance Education	Kawana	Rockhampton	1993	23.3372°S 150.5148°E	Distance education centre at 241–259 Farm Street, co-located with Glenmore State School and Glenmore State High School.
Capricornia School of Distance Education	Emerald	Central Highlands	1993	23.5323°S 148.1520°E	Distanced education centre at the corner Gray and Gladstone Streets, co-located with Denison State School.
Longreach School of Distance Education	Longreach	Longreach	1987		Distance education centre
Rockhampton North Special School	Frenchville	Rockhampton	1977		On site of previous SS
Rockhampton Special School	Rockhampton City	Rockhampton	1976		
Rosella Park School	Gladstone	Gladstone	1971		

=== Defunct state schools ===
Name	Suburb	LGA	Opened	Closed	Coords	Notes
Alsace State School	Alsace	Central Highlands	1977	1987		
Alton Downs State School	Alton Downs	Rockhampton	1890	1964	23.3071°S 150.3869°E	Located at 1247 Ridgelands Road.
Arthur's Creek State School	Baffle Creek	Gladstone	c1910	c1936		See Baffle Creek State School below
Baffle Creek State School	Baffle Creek	Gladstone	1955	1965		There was an earlier school known as Baffle Creek State School which changed name to Arthur's Creek State School. It existed from approximately 1910–1936.
Bariveloe State School	Bariveloe (now in Colosseum)	Gladstone	1927	1947	approx 24.4244°S 151.5246°E	Located on Bariveloe Road just south of Colosseum Creek.
Barmoya East State School	Barmoya	Livingstone	1911	1969	23.14461°S 150.54377°E	Opened 1911 as Barmoya Settlement State School, renamed 1935 Barmoya East State School. Located at 9 C H Barretts Road (corner of East Barmoya Road).
Bathampton State School	Bathampton (now in Clermont)	Central Highlands	1891	1950		
Berajondo State School	Berajondo	Gladstone	1895	1965	24.62758°S 151.83250°E	Opened in 1895 as Milsted Provisional School, became Milstead State School in 1909, renamed Murray's Creek State School in 1911, renamed Berajondo State School in 1931. Located at 173 Dawsons Road.
Berserker Street State Infants School	Berserker	Rockhampton	1957	1994		Merged into Berserker Street State School
Blair Athol State School	Blair Athol	Isaac	1893	1974		
Bogantungan State School	Bogantungan	Central Highlands	1883	1972	23.6501°S 147.2875°E	Located on the west side of Jackson Street.
Bondoola State School	Bondoola	Livingstone	1887	1933	approx 23.1746°S 150.6880°E	1887 opened as Kington Provisional School. 1897 renamed Bondoola Provisional School. It was north of Cobraball Road.
Bondoola State School	Bondoola	Livingstone	1933	1945	23.17460°S 150.68795°E	It was relocated in 1933 to immediately south of the railway station at 54 Bondoola Road.
Boolburra State School	Boolburra	Central Highlands	1874	1926	23.73487°S 149.78337°E	The school reserve of 6 acres 1 rood 10 perches (2.55 ha) was proclaimed in 1883, just north of the Boolburra railway station bounded by Station Road, Dawson Road, and Thomas Street.
Bowman State School	Bowman (now in Ogmore)	Livingstone	1921	1926		Opened as Styx Coal Mine Provisional School. In 1923 reopened at a new location as Bowman State School.
Bracewell State School	Bracewell	Gladstone	1915	2000	23.9290°S 150.8983°E	Located at 1444 Mount Larcom Bracewell Road.
Braeside State School	Braeside (now in Strathfield)	Isaac	1923	1967		
Buckland State School	Buckland	Central Highlands	1909	1959		
Bunerba State School	Bunerba (now in Dululu)	Banana	1922	1996	23.8748°S 150.2979°E	Located at 88 Bunerba School Road.
Buneru State School	Wowan	Banana	1918	1934	23.96828°S 150.16419°E	Located on the south-western corner of Portion 100 on the (now) Leichhardt Highway.
Buneru State School	Wowan	Banana	1934	1962	23.9576°S 150.1492°E	Following flooding in 1928, the decision was made to relocate and enlarge the school, at the south-west corner of Buneru Road and Buneru School Road.
Bungundarra State School	Bungundarra	Livingstone	1912	1950	approx 23.06011°S 150.65378°E	Located on the western side of Bungundarra Road.
Butlerville State School	Mount Larcom	Gladstone	1918	1927	23.7525°S 151.0324°E	Located on a five-acre (2.0 ha) site on the western side of a bend in The Narrows Road.
Callide State School	Callide (now in Jambin)	Banana	1925	1971	24.3012°S 150.4588°E	Located on Callide Road. Although it is within the town of Callide, it is within the present-day boundaries of the neighbouring locality of Jambin.
Calliope Station State School	Mount Alma	Gladstone	1912	1956	24.0306°S 150.9624°E	Located at 44 Galloway Plains Road.
Calliungal North State School	Baree	Rockhampton	1904	1971	23.6130°S 150.39134°E	Also known unofficially as North Culliungal State School and Baree State School, it opened in April 1904, closing in 1929. In 1933 it reopened, closing finally in 1971. It was at 3–5 Calliungal Road.
Calmorin State School	Ridgelands	Rockhampton	1921	1963		Originally opened as Ridgelands Provisional School, renamed Calmorin State School in 1924.
Calvale State School	Valentine Plains	Banana	1940	1956	approx 24.3749°S 150.6284°E	Located on Calvale Road.
Cardbeign State School	Cairdbeign	Central Highlands	circa 1894	circa 1931	24.2255°S 148.1047°E	Located on Dalmally Road. Note the variant spelling.
Carmila West State School	Carmila	Isaac	1924	1965		
Cedar Vale State School	Bracewell	Gladstone	1926	1978	23.9289°S 150.8984°E	Located on a bend in the Mount Larcom Bracewell Road.
Clinker Creek State School	Thangool	Banana	1938	1942	24.56267°S 150.52876°E	Located on the south-west corner of Drumburie Road and Frawleys Road.
Clio District State School	Clio (now in north-east Kynuna)	Winton	1969	1977		
Cockatoo Provisional School	Cockatoo	Banana	Prior to 1958	1963		Operated by a governess in a school provided by local parents unil the Queensland Government provided a teacher from 1958. This school closed in 1963.
Cockatoo State School	Cockatoo (now in Bungaban)	Banana / Western Downs	1984	2000	25.7901°S 150.2604°E	Cockatoo State School opened on 23 January 1984 and closed on 31 December 2000. It was located in the south of Cockatoo, now within neighbouring Bungaban at 1473 Ponty Pool Road.
Coominglah State School	Lawgi Dawes	Banana	circa 1939	circa 1947	24.70892°S 150.81085°E	Located on Burns Road.
Copperfield State School	Copperfield (now in Clermont)	Isaac	1875	1942		Copperfield is an abandoned mining town about 4 km south-west of Clermont (town) on Rubyvale Road.
Coreen State School	Orange Creek	Banana	1933	1951	approx 24.3319°S 150.4009°E	Located on Prospect Creek Goovigen Road. It takes its name from the local parish name.
Corfield State School	Corfield	Winton	1957	1989		
Cracow State School	Cracow	Banana	1933	1997	25.2933°S 150.3010°E	At 11–17 Third Avenue.
Dalma State School	Dalma	Rockhampton	1901	2006	23.3537°S 150.2432°E	Also known as Dalma Scrub State School. Located at 5 Shannen Road.
Dalma Road State School	Alton Downs	Rockhampton	1901	1934	23.3454°S 150.3478°E	At 32 Harding Road (north-west corner of Nicholson Road).
Dawes State School	Lawgi Dawes	Banana	June 1932	October 1932	approx 24.6473°S 150.7477°E	It was located near the proposed Dawes railway station at the intersection of the Burnett Highway and Blackmans Yard Road.
Diamantina State School	Diamantina Lakes	Diamantina	1955	1963		
Dixalea State School	Dixalea	Banana	1923	1938	23.9457°S 150.2923°E	Opened as Dixie State School, it was renamed Dixalea State School in 1924. Located at approx 120 Dixalea Doreen Road.
Don River State School	Dixalea	Banana	1916	1932		Don River State School opened on 21 August 1916 with an initial enrolment of 50 students.
Don River State School	Dixalea	Banana	1932	circa 1954	23.9720°S 150.3080°E	It closed on 25 January 1932, but reopened on 18 April 1933 having been relocated to a more central position on Mcdonalds Road.
Don River State School	Dixalea	Banana	circa 1954	1964	approx 23.9920°S 150.3065°E	It closed again in 1952 and reopened in 1958 before finally closing on 5 June 1964, by which time it had been relocated south of the Don River to Tomlins Road.
Dululu State School	Dululu	Banana	1916	1968	23.8496°S 150.2612°E	Dululu State School opened circa August 1916 and closed on 11 April 1968. It was at 30 Bryant Street.
Earlsfield State School	Earlsfield (now in Jambin)	Banana	1936	1958	24.2052°S 150.4336°E	Opened as Arogoon (also written as Argoon) State School i opened on 30 July 1936, but was renamed Earlsfield State School by October 1936. It closed in 1958. It was on the northern corner of Earlsfield Road and Earlsfield Pit Road.
East End State School	East End	Gladstone	1915	1963		
Edungalba State School	Edungalba (now in Boolburra)	Central Highlands	1915	1974	approx 23.71491°S 149.85919°E	Herbert's Creek State School opened on 26 April 1915, but was renamed Edungalba State School in 1918. It closed on 4 February 1974. It was not in the town of Edungalba, but slightly north-west of the town between Herbert Creek and the railway line (approx 23.71491°S 149.85919°E).
Elphinstone State School	Elphinstone	Isaac	1880	1963		
Etna Creek State School	Etna Creek	Livingstone	1892	circa 1922	approx 23.22511°S 150.48075°E	The first school site was on the Yaamba Road near the intersection with the railway line.
Etna Creek State School	Etna Creek	Livingstone	circa 1922	1950	23.21345°S 150.43203°E	The second school site was at 479 Etna Creek Road.
Evesham State School	Morella (now in Longreach)	Longreach	1967	2009		The school was on Silsoe Road. The school's website was archived.
Fernlees State School	Fernlees (Gindie)	Central Highlands	1951	1953	approx 23.8479°S 148.1214°E	Located on a two-acre (0.81 ha) site off to the west of the Gregory Highway and north of the town.
Figton State School	Colosseum	Gladstone	1904	1917	approx 24.44889°S 151.58488°E	Mount Pleasant Provisional School opened in 1904, being renamed in the same year Figton Provisional School. On 1 January 1909, it became Figton State School. It closed in 1917. It was in the middle of farmland; today this is just north of the Bruce Highway, but the highway did not exist at that time.
Flaggy Rock Creek State School	Flaggy Rock (now in Clairview)	Isaac	1916	1996	21.9682°S 149.4441°E	Opened as Rocky Dam State School. Renamed Flaggy Rock Creek State School in 1920. It was at 85 Flaggy Rock Road.
Garnant State School	Garnant	Rockhampton	1930	1969	23.1902°S 150.2595°E	Located on Evans Road.
Gregory Mine State School	via Blackwater	Central Highlands	1978	1979		
Greycliffe State School	Greycliffe (now Orange Creek)	Banana	1935	1993	24.2661°S 150.3562°E	Located on the corner of Belldeen Greycliffe Road and Prospect Creek Goovigen Road, now within the boundaries of Orange Creek.
Hamilton Creek State School	Hamilton Creek	Rockhampton	1908	1972	23.6746°S 150.4008°E	Located at 50536 Burnett Highway (opposite Golf Links Road).
Hourigan Creek State School	Raglan	Gladstone	1916	circa 1932	approx 23.7378°S 150.7829°E	Located on or near Hourigan Creek Road.
Hut Creek State School	Ambrose	Gladstone	1921	1945	approx 23.8477°S 150.8985°E	Located on Hut Creek Road.
Ilbilbie State School	Ilbilbie	Isaac	1930	1960	21.7151°S 149.3628°E	Located at approx 87133 Bruce Highway.
Jooro State School	Jooro (now in Goovigen)	Banana	1935	1963	24.1105°S 150.1888°E	Located on a five-acre (2.0 ha) site on the east of Claire Lane.
Joskeleigh State School	Joskeleigh	Livingstone	1913	1985	23.3676°S 150.7829°E	Located at 356 Joskeleigh Road.
Kalapa State School	Kalapa	Rockhampton	1915	1996	23.5105°S 150.2682°E	Located at 22 Kalapa Black Mountain Road.
Kariboe Creek State School	Thangool	Banana	1930	1963	24.4631°S 150.5229°E	There was an earlier Kariboe Creek Provision School from 1925 to 1926. Kariboe Creek State School was located at 1 Mullers Lane.
Katherine Creek State School	Katherine Creek (now in Maneroo)	Longreach	1968	1979		
Kokotungo State School	Kokotungo	Banana	1939	1969		
Konara State School	Konara (now Oakey Creek)	Rockhampton	1919	1927	approx 23.7633°S 150.36009°E	Located north of the Konara railway station, between the railway line and the Dee River, just south of the confluence with Fletcher Creek (approx 23.7633°S 150.36009°E), now in Oakey Creek.
Kooingal State School	Kooingal (now in Prospect)	Banana	1931	1956	24.5287°S 150.4271°E	Located at 1382 Crowsdale Camboon Road.
Kroombit Provisional School	Thangool	Banana	1933	1936		
Laidlaw State School	via Longreach	Longreach	1967	1971		
Lake Pleasant State School	Goovigen	Banana	1925	1964	24.09850°S 150.30060°E	Located at 470 Lake Pleasant Road north of the town of Goovigen.
Langmorn State School	Ambrose	Gladstone	1928	1962	23.8185°S 150.8823°E	Located at 187 Langmorn School Road.
Laurinel State School	Mount Gardiner	Central Highlands	1983	1987		
Leichhardt Ward Boys State School	Rockhampton City	Rockhampton	1905	1986		Merged with The Hall Girls' & Infants' School
Machine Creek State School	Machine Creek	Gladstone	1911	1970	23.8378°S 150.9377°E	Located at 540 Mount Larcom Bracewell Road (north-west corner of Ambrose Bracewell Road). The school building was later relocated to the Calliope River Historical Village at River Ranch.
Mackenzie River State School	Mackenzie River	Isaac	1973	2018	22.9503°S 148.9287°E	Mackenzie River State School opened on 21 May 1973, but closed in 2018 after having no students enrol in 2017. It was at 31145 Fitzroy Developmental Road. The school's website was archived.
Mahrigong State School	Corfield	Winton	1966	1981		Mahrigong is a sheep station 56 miles East from Winton.
Maida Hill State School	Maida Hill (now in Opalton)	Winton	1878	1913		
Malakoff Road State School	Theodore	Banana	1913	1965		
Many Peaks State School	Many Peaks	Gladstone	1909	1973	24.5446°S 151.3727°E	Opened 1909 as Nanandu Provisional School, renamed 1909 Many Peaks State School. Located at 5 Wentworth Street.
Mardale State School	Lawgi Dawes	Banana	1935	1964		Lawgi SS until 1952
Miclere Provisional School	Kilcummin	Isaac	1941	1954		Was closed between 6 June 1943 and 24 August 1947. Miclere is now in Kilcummin.
Middlemount State High School	Middlemount	Isaac	1988	2000		Amalgamated into Middlemount Community School
Middlemount State School	Middlemount	Isaac	1980	2000		Amalgamated into Middlemount Community School
Morinish Provisional School	Morinish	Rockhampton	circa 1882	circa 1890		It is not clear if this was the same school closing and reopening or two different schools with the same name.
Morinish Provisional School	Morinish	Rockhampton	circa 1894	circa 1897		It is not clear if this was the same school closing and reopening or two different schools with the same name.
Morinish State School	Morinish	Rockhampton	1902	1928	approx 23.2512°S 150.1566°E	Opened as Morinish No 1 Provisional School, becoming Morinish State School in 1915. It closed in 1928. It was on Morinish Road. In 1930, the school building was relocated to establish Garnant State School.
Morinish No 2 Provisional School	Morinish	Rockhampton	1902	1915		
Mount Chalmers State School	Mount Chalmers	Livingstone	1901	2005	23.2989°S 150.6409°E	Located at 16 School Street.
Mount Scoria State School	Mount Scoria (Thangool)	Banana	1930	1958	approx 24.5330°S 150.6164°E	Located to the immediate north-east of the Mount Scoria railway station.
Nerimbera State School	Nerimbera	Livingstone	1921	2009	23.4006°S 150.5888°E	Located at 4 Graff Road on the corner Nerimbera School Road.
Ogmore State School	Ogmore	Livingstone	1924	1999	22.6225°S 149.6609°E	Opened as Hartley Provisional School, 1933 renamed Ogmore. Located at 2–4 Wilangi Street.
Oyster Creek State School	Oyster Creek	Gladstone	1913	circa 1943	approx 24.4440°S 151.85119°E	On the western side of Oyster Creek Road.
Pasha State School	Pasha	Central Highlands	1975	1977		
Peek-A-Doo State School	Eurombah	Banana	1964	2010	25.9081°S 149.4995°E	Located at 10118 Roma Taroom Road. The school's website was archived.
Pheasant Creek State School	Pheasant Creek	Banana	circa 1919	circa 1921		Pheasant Creek Provisional School opened circa 1919, but closed circa 1921. It was a tent school, which was relocated to Benarabin.
Pheasant Creek State School	Pheasant Creek	Banana	1925	1928		After much local lobbying, in 1925, a new school building was erected and opened as Pheasant Creek State School, but it had closed by 1928 with the building proposed to be relocated to Biloela.
Pheasant Creek State School	Pheasant Creek	Banana	1940	1967	23.81876°S 150.06903°E	Lobbying for a school resumed in 1936. In April 1940, tenders were called for a new school building (possibly funded by the local community), which opened on 29 October 1940. It closed permanently in 1967. It was on the western side of Grantleigh Pheasant Creek Road.
Pink Lily Lagoon State School	Pink Lily	Rockhampton	1872	1971	23.3576°S 150.4704°E	Located at 17 Six Mile Road.
Playfair State	Bushley	Rockhampton	1917	1928	23.5364°S 150.2661°E	The school was located at approximately 213 Sandy Creek Road.
Polmaily State School	Colosseum	Gladstone	1900	1935	24.3885°S 151.5221°E	Polmaily State School was at 664 Blackmans Gap Road, Colosseum.
Raedon State School	Biloela	Banana	1929	1959	24.3662°S 150.4985°E	Originally Callide Bridge SS and briefly renamed Melton and Raeworth before becoming Raedon. Located at 11 Teys Road, now within Biloela but on the locality boundary with Dakenba.
Raglan State School	Raglan	Gladstone	1879	1996	23.7196°S 150.8237°E	Located at 18 Langmorn Street.
Rannes State School	Rannes	Banana	1916	1966	approx 24.10208°S 150.12252°E	Located on the northern side of Goovigen Rannes Road and the railway line.
Red Hill State School	Mount Morgan	Rockhampton	1900	circa 1931	approx 23.6529°S 150.3758°E	Located in the Red Hill neighbourhood of Mount Morgan and is presumably the origin of the name of School Street.
Riverston State School	Taragoola	Gladstone	circa 1936	1960		Coordinates for Riverston are within Lake Awoonga so may have been inundated by the construction of the dam
Rockhampton Central Boys' State School	Rockhampton City	Rockhampton	1862	1963		
Rockhampton Central Girls' State School	Rockhampton City	Rockhampton	1875	1973		
Rockhampton Central Infants School	Rockhampton City	Rockhampton	1876	1962		Merged into Girls' School
Rockhampton North State School	Frenchville	Rockhampton	1871	1966		Split sex 1888–1920
Rocky Crossing State School	Jundah	Barcoo	1988	2003		
Rossmoya State School	Rossmoya	Livingstone	1923	1968	23.02557°S 150.48425°E	Located at 1770 Rossmoya Road.
Rubyvale State School	Rubyvale	Central Highlands	1908	1963		
Sapphire State School	Sapphire	Central Highlands	1904	1939		
Sleipner Junction Provisional School	Nankin	Livingstone	1913	1923		
Spring Creek State School	Spring Creek	Banana	1871	1954		
Spring Creek Upper State School	Spring Creek Upper	Banana	1915	1970		
Struck Oil State School	Struck Oil	Rockhampton	1905	1944	approx 23.61226°S 150.45112°E	Located on the south side of Struck Oil Road.
Styx River State School	Styx (now in Ogmore)	Livingstone	1919	1942	22.5916°S 149.6337°E	Located on Styx Road near the railway station.
Surprise Creek State School	now in Opalton	Winton	circa 1902	circa 1908		
Tableland Provisional School	Tablelands	Gladstone	1905	c. 1916	approx 24.29139°S 150.95093°E	Located on Tableland Road.
Targinnie State School	Targinnie	Gladstone	1923	1968		
Ten Mile Creek Provisional School	Morinish	Rockhampton	1916	circa 1917		
Thompson's Point State School	Thompsons Point	Livingstone	1906	1929		
Tiamby Provisional School	Thangool	Banana	1933	1942	24.6813°S 150.4738°E	Located on the north-eastern corner of 3224 Crowsdale Camboon Road.
Turkey Road State School	Bororen	Gladstone	1921	1931	approx 24.2181°S 151.5305°E	Located on Bates Road.
Turnorville Provisional School	Mackay or Sarina area?		1960	1962		
Ulam South State School	via Bajool	Rockhampton	1894	1925	23.76616°S 150.63318°E	Located on a 5-acre (2.0 ha) site at 1385 South Ulam Road near the junction with Comerford Road.
Ulam Upper State School	via Bajool	Rockhampton	circa 1892	circa 1961		
Valentine Plains State School	Valentine Plains	Banana	1928	1967	24.4195°S 150.5795°E	Located on Valentine Plains Road.
Wallaroo Provisional School	Wallaroo	Central Highlands	circa 1898	1909		
Walterhall State School	Walterhall	Rockhampton	1917	1969		
Wartburg State School	Wartburg	Gladstone	1913	1966		
Wattlebank State School	Barmoya?	Livingstone	1918	1933		Barmoya Central State School opened on 28 August 1918. In February 1930, the school was closed because it had only seven students; it was suggested that the school should be moved to a more central location. In October 1931, it was proposed to relocate the school building to Rossmoya Road where 16 students could attend the school, but some parents thought it was too distant for their children to travel to and from the school each day. In June 1932, it was decided to move the school to Rossmoya Road, but, in March 1933, the government said there were insufficient funds available to move the school at that time.
Wattlebank State School	Wattlebank	Livingstone	1934	1959	23.13030°S 150.45931°E	In September 1933, tenders were called to relocate the school. The school was relocated in January 1934. In 1936, it was renamed Wattlebank State School. It closed in December 1959. It was on the western side of Rossmoya Road in Wattlebank.
West Hill State School	Carmila	Isaac	1925	2004	21.8099°S 149.3710°E	West Hill is an unbounded locality in the north of the locality of Carmila. Located at 14 Red Hill Road. The school website was archived.
Withersfield State School	Withersfield (now within Willows)	Central Highlands	1920	circa 1942	approx 23.5757°S 147.5643°E	Located north of the former town of Withersfield on a five-acre-two-rood-eleven-perch (2.25 ha) site.
Woodbury Provisional School	Woodbury	Livingstone	1923	1925		
Wooderson State School	Wooderson	Gladstone	1945	1960	24.1204°S 151.0796°E	Located on a 4-acre-32-perch (1.70 ha) site at 306 Wooderson Road.
Woolein State School	Woolein	Banana	1918	1924		
Wura State School	Wura	Rockhampton	1924	circa 1944	approx 23.8160°S 150.3273°E	Located between the Wuru railway station and the Dee River.
Wycarbah State School	Wycarbah	Rockhampton	1876	circa 1935	23.54446°S 150.21271°E	Rosewood Crossing Provisional School opened on 31 July 1876. In 1892, it was renamed Wycarbah Provisional School. On 1 January 1909, it became Wycarbah State School. It closed circa 1935. It was at 14 Wycarbah Road.
Yaamba State School	Yaamba	Livingstone	1867	1940	approx 23.1328°S 150.3670°E	Located on the north-west corner of Iris Street and Yaamba Siding Road.
Yalleroi State School	Yalleroi	Blackall-Tambo	1933	1983	24.0674°S 145.7603°E	Located on the south-east corner of Mitchell Street and Flinders Street.
Yaparaba State School	Lawgi Dawes	Banana	1934	1970	approx 24.63521°S 150.70782°E	Located on a bend in Yaparaba School Road to the immediate south of the never-constructed Yaparaba railway station on the never-constructed section of the Callide Valley railway line.
Yaraka State School	Yaraka	Longreach	1920	2009	24.8861°S 144.0754°E	Located at 11 Quilp Street. The school's website was archived.
Yeppoon State Infants School	Yeppoon	Livingstone	1957	1968		Merged into SS

== Private schools ==
=== Catholic schools ===
In Queensland, Catholic primary schools are usually (but not always) linked to a parish. Prior to the 1970s, most schools were founded by religious institutes, but with the decrease in membership of these institutes, together with major reforms inside the church, lay teachers and administrators began to take over the schools, a process which completed by approximately 1990.

Within the region, schools are administered by Catholic Education Office, Diocese of Rockhampton, which was established in 1966 and was the first Catholic Education Office (CEO) in Queensland. They are supported by the Queensland Catholic Education Commission, which is responsible for coordinating administration, curriculum and policy across the Catholic school system. Preference for enrolment is given to Catholic students from the parish or local area, although non-Catholic students are admitted if room is available.

Name	Suburb	LGA	M/F/Co-ed	Years	Opened	Coordinates	Notes
Chanel College	West Gladstone	Gladstone	Co-ed	7–12	1966		
Emmaus College	Park Avenue	Rockhampton	Co-ed	7–12	1983		
Marist College Emerald	Emerald	Central Highlands	Co-ed	7–12	1996	23.5435°S 148.1592°E	At 30 Jeppesen Drive.
Our Lady's Primary School	Longreach	Longreach	Co-ed	P–6	1902		
Our Lady of the Sacred Heart Primary School	Springsure	Central Highlands	Co-ed	P–6	1926		
Rockhampton Flexible Learning Centre	Rockhampton	Rockhampton	Co-ed	7–12			Operated by Edmund Rice Foundation.
Sacred Heart Primary School (Yeppoon)	Lammermoor	Livingstone	Co-ed	P–6	1958		
St Anthony's Catholic Primary School	Norman Gardens	Rockhampton	Co-ed	P–6	1900		
St Benedict's Catholic Primary School	Pacific Heights	Livingstone	Co-ed	P–6	2009		
St. Brendan's College	Adelaide Park	Livingstone	M	7–12	1939	23.1162°S 150.7300°E	139 Adelaide Park Road.
St Brigid's Catholic Primary School	Emerald	Central Highlands	Co-ed	P–6	2014	23.5597°S 148.1696°E	At 6311 Gregory Highway.
St Francis' Catholic Primary School	Tannum Sands	Gladstone	Co-ed	P–6	2005	23.9431°S 151.3609°E	At 1 Francis Way.
St John the Baptist Catholic Primary School	Clinton	Gladstone	Co-ed	P–6	1977		
St Joseph's Catholic Primary School	Barcaldine	Barcaldine	Co-ed	P–6	1896		
St Joseph's Catholic School	Biloela	Banana	Co-ed	P–6	1939		
St Joseph's Catholic Primary School	Blackall	Blackall-Tambo	Co-ed	P–6	1917		
St Joseph's School	Clermont	Central Highlands	Co-ed	P–6	1900	22.8220°S 147.6391°E	At 50 Box Street.
St Joseph's Primary School	Park Avenue	Rockhampton	Co-ed	P–6	1929		
St Joseph's Primary School	Wandal	Rockhampton	Co-ed	P–6	1916		
St Mary's Catholic Primary School	Berserker	Rockhampton	Co-ed	P–6	1900		
St Patrick's School	Emerald	Central Highlands	Co-ed	P–6	1902	23.5233°S 148.1621°E	At 41 Yamala Street.
St Patrick's School	Winton	Winton	Co-ed	P–6	1906	22.3851°S 143.0399°E	At Oondooroo Street.
St Paul's Primary School	Gracemere	Rockhampton	Co-ed	P–6	1988		
St Peter's School	Allenstown	Rockhampton	Co-ed	P–6	1934		
St Ursula's College	Yeppoon	Livingstone	F	7–12	1918	23.1300°S 150.7434°E	42–62 Queen Street.
Star of the Sea School	Gladstone Central	Gladstone	Co-ed	P–6	1902		
The Cathedral College	Allenstown	Rockhampton	Co-ed	7–12	1991	23.3861°S 150.5051°E	At 189 William Street.

=== Independent schools ===
Name	Suburb	LGA	M/F/Co-ed	Years	Category	Opened	Coords	Notes
Carinity Education Rockhampton	Glenlee	Livingstone	Co-ed	7-12	Baptist	1996	23.2526°S 150.4941°E	Special school for students at risk of disengagement with mainstream schooling. At 46 Dawson Road.
Clearview Christian College	Tannum Sands	Gladstone	Co-ed	7–12	Christian	2023	23.9401°S 151.3662°E	At 1 Canoe Point Road. As at 2025, it offers Years 7 to 10, but, by 2027, will offer Years 7 to 12.
Discovery Christian College	Agnes Water	Gladstone	Co-ed	P–12	Christian	2015		
Emerald Christian College	Emerald	Central Highlands	Co-ed	P–12	Christian	2001	23.5528°S 148.1708°E	At 6373 Gregory Highway.
Faith Baptist Christian School	Burua	Gladstone	Co-ed	P–12	Baptist	1998		
Goora Gan Steiner School	Agnes Water	Gladstone	Co-ed	P–6	Steiner			
Heights College	Kawana	Rockhampton	Co-ed	P–12	Assemblies of God	1989		Cathedral of Praise Christian College until 2003
Kingsley College	The Common	Rockhampton	Co-ed	P–12	Christian	1993		Formerly Central Queensland Christian College
Lighthouse Christian School	Norman Gardens	Rockhampton	Co-ed	P–12	Baptist	1994		Formerly Norman Park Christian School
Ontrack College Emerald	Emerald	Central Highlands	Co-ed	7–10	Christian	2018	23.5266°S 148.1614°E	For students who have disengaged from mainstream schools. At 114 Borilla Street.
Redeemer Lutheran College	Biloela	Banana	Co-ed	P–12	Lutheran	1978		
Rockhampton Girls Grammar School	The Range	Rockhampton	F	P–12	Non-denominational	1892		
Rockhampton Grammar School	The Range	Rockhampton	Co-ed	P–12	Non-denominational	1881		
Trinity College	Sun Valley	Gladstone	Co-ed	P–12	Baptist	1985		
Wadja Wadja High School	Woorabinda	Woorabinda	Co-ed	7–12	Aboriginal	1991	24.1332°S 149.4560°E	At 116 Munns Drive.

=== Defunct private schools ===
Name	Suburb	LGA	Category	Years	Opened	Closed	Notes
Capricorn Christian Primary School	Kawana	Rockhampton	7DA	Primary	1972	2001	
Glenden Christian School	Glenden	Isaac	Christian	Primary	1995	1997	
Marian College	Park Avenue	Rockhampton	Catholic girls	High	1964	1983	Merged into Emmaus College
Range Convent High School	Rockhampton City	Rockhampton	Catholic girls	High	1896	1990	Merged into The Cathedral College
Range Convent High School	Woorabinda	Woorabinda	Catholic	High	1987	1990	
Sacred Heart Primary School	Mount Morgan	Rockhampton	Catholic	Primary	1891	1997	
St Faith's School	Yeppoon	Livingstone	Anglican Girls	P–12	1923	1968	
St Joseph's Christian Brothers College	Rockhampton City	Rockhampton	Catholic boys	High	1894	1990	Merged into The Cathedral College
St Mary's School	Taroom	Banana	Catholic	Primary	1920	2015	
St Stanislaus College	Park Avenue	Rockhampton	Catholic boys	High	1958	1983	Merged into Emmaus College
St Stephen's Lutheran College	Glen Eden	Gladstone	Lutheran	P–12	2002	2016	
Stella Maris College	Gladstone	Gladstone	Catholic	High	1966	1976	Became Part of Chanel College

== See also ==
- Lists of schools in Queensland
