= The Narrows, Queensland =

The Narrows
- Suburb
- Interactive map of The Narrows
- Coordinates: 23.6130°S 150.9649°E
- Country: Australia
- State: Queensland
- LGA: Gladstone Region
- Location: 27.6 km (17.1 mi) S of Mount Larcom; 50.9 km (31.6 mi) NNW of Gladstone; 103 km (64 mi) SE of Rockhampton; 587 km (365 mi) NNW of Brisbane

Government
  - State electorate: Gladstone
  - Federal division: Flynn

Area
  - Total: 323.1 km^{2} (124.7 sq mi)

Population
  - Total: 0 (2021 census)
  - Density: 0.0000/km^{2} (0.000/sq mi)
- Time zone: UTC+10:00 (AEST)
- Postcode: 4695
Suburbs around The Narrows
Thompson Point	Coral Sea	Curtis Island
Port Alma	The Narrows	Curtis Island
Marmor; Raglan	Darts Creek; Mount Larcom	Targinnie

The Narrows is a coastal locality in the Gladstone Region, Queensland, Australia. In the 2021 census, The Narrows had "no people or a very low population".

== Geography ==
The waters and inlets of the Coral Sea form the north-western, northern, and north-eastern boundaries. The locality shares its name with The Narrows channel on the north-east of the locality (23.6367°S 151.0678°E) that separates the Queensland mainland from Curtis Island.

The northern part of the locality is wetlands and includes Balaclava Island (23.5836°S 150.9230°E). Strictly Balaclava is three separate islands as narrow channels pass through Balaclava; it has a combined land area of 46.9 square kilometres (18.1 sq mi).

Ramsay Crossing is a ford (23.6410°S 151.0775°E) between the locality and Curtis Island. It is approximately 500 metres (1,600 ft) across.

The northern part of the locality is marshland. The southern part of the locality is a protected area consisting of:

- Rundle Range National Park, 2,170 hectares (5,400 acres)
- Rundle State Forest, 3,860 hectares (9,500 acres) of production forestry
- Rundle Range Resources Reserve, 706 hectares (1,740 acres)

== History ==
Balaclava Island was named in 1864 by Commander J. Jeffrey of the Royal Navy, the captain of the HM Colonial Schooner Pearl, 1864, after the 1854 Battle of Balaclava in the Crimean War, which included the Charge of the Light Brigade.

Rundle Range National Park was gazetted on 16 December 1994 to protect an area of Casuarina cristata and dry rainforest.

Rundle Range Resources Reserve was gazetted on 11 August 2006. It was established to provide a buffer between the national park and the Rundle Shale Oil Project.

== Demographics ==
In the 2016 census, The Narrows had "no people or a very low population".

In the 2021 census, The Narrows had "no people or a very low population".

== Education ==
There are no schools in The Narrows. The nearest government primary schools are Ambrose State School in Ambrose to the south and Mount Larcom State School in Mount Larcom to south. The nearest government secondary schools are Mount Larcom State School (to Year 10) and Gladstone State High School (to Year 12) in West Gladstone to the south-east.

== Amenities ==
There are two boat ramps in the locality, managed by the Gladstone Regional Council. They are in the vicinity of Ramsay Crossing at 23.6385°S 151.0681°E and 23.6431°S 151.0756°E.
