= Bracewell, Queensland =

Bracewell
- Suburb
- Interactive map of Bracewell
- Coordinates: 23.9255°S 150.9063°E
- Country: Australia
- State: Queensland
- LGA: Gladstone Region
- Location: 14.7 km (9.1 mi) SW of Mount Larcom; 46.3 km (28.8 mi) W of Gladstone; 85.8 km (53.3 mi) SE of Rockhampton; 553 km (344 mi) NNW of Brisbane

Government
  - State electorate: Gladstone
  - Federal division: Flynn

Area
  - Total: 143.4 km^{2} (55.4 sq mi)

Population
  - Total: 178 (2021 census)
  - Density: 1.241/km^{2} (3.215/sq mi)
- Time zone: UTC+10:00 (AEST)
- Postcode: 4695
Suburbs around Bracewell
Raglan	Ambrose	Machine Creek
Raglan	Bracewell	East End
Mount Alma	Mount Alma	Mount Alma

Bracewell is a rural locality in the Gladstone Region, Queensland, Australia. In the 2021 census, Bracewell had a population of 178 people.

== Geography ==
Zamia Knob is a mountain in the south of the locality (23.9694°S 150.9175°E), rising to 281 metres (922 ft) above sea level.

The predominant land use is grazing on native vegetation.

== History ==
The Bracewell Public Hall (also known as the Bracewell School of Arts) was opened in January 1914 on Mr Cuthbert's land beside the main road in the town. The building was 45 feet (14 m) by 25 feet (7.6 m). It was at 1237 Mount Larcom Bracewell Road (23.8686°S 150.8966°E).

Bracewell State School opened on 5 July 1915 and closed on 30 June 2000. The school was at 1444 Mount Larcom Bracewell Road (23.8865°S 150.8922°E).

Cedar Vale State School opened on 12 April 1926 and closed on 15 December 1978. It was on a bend in the Mount Larcom Bracewell Road (23.9290°S 150.8983°E).

== Demographics ==
In the 2011 census, the population of Bracewell and its neighbour East End was 462 people.

In the 2016 census, Bracewell had a population of 196 people.

In the 2021 census, Bracewell had a population of 178 people.

== Education ==
There are no schools in Bracewell. The nearest government primary schools are Ambrose State School in neighbouring Ambrose to the north and Mount Larcom State School in Mount Larcom to the north-east. The nearest government secondary schools are Mount Larcom State School (to Year 10) in Mount Larcom and Gladstone State High School (to Year 12) in West Gladstone to the east.

== See also ==
- List of schools in Central Queensland
