= Clifford Harry Thompson =

Australian geomorphologist (1926–2005)

Clifford Harry Thompson AM (1 April 1926 – 8 May 2005) was an Australian geomorphologist and principal research scientist with the Commonwealth Scientific and Industrial Research Organisation (CSIRO). Thompson's extensive research into coastal soils was influential in establishing K'gari (Fraser Island) as a World Heritage Site and in the development and management of the Cooloola National Park, Queensland. In 2004, he was awarded an Order of Australia in recognition of his contribution to soil science as a researcher and educator, and as an advisor in land management practices and conservation issues.

== Early life and education ==
Born in the Central Queensland town of Rockhampton, Thompson grew up on a fruit and dairy farm in Ambrose near Mount Larcom, Queensland, attending the local public school. In 1940, he won a scholarship to Gatton Agricultural College, completing a diploma of horticulture in 1944 and remaining at the college to teach horticulture until 1946.

== Career ==
In 1946, Thompson joined CSIRO, where he worked various projects in New South Wales, Victoria, and Tasmania, before settling back at the Queensland Plant and Soils laboratory located in St Lucia, Brisbane. At St Lucia, Thompson met Betty Kennedy, who was a senior typist with the CSIRO. They married on the 15 April 1950.

In the latter part of Thompson's career, he worked predominantly for the CSIRO Division of Soils and later the Division of Water Research. He worked extensively around Australia in soil mapping, mine rehabilitation, and interpreting soils in land-use surveys. Thompson's work on podzol development and the multidisciplinary research on the dunes at Cooloola, Queensland, are internationally recognised.

== Later life ==
After retirement, Thompson continued his coastal soils research as an Honorary Fellow within CSIRO Tropical Agriculture and CSIRO Sustainable Ecosystems. He was influential in establishing Fraser Island as a World Heritage Site and in the development and management of the Cooloola National Park.

== Honours ==
Thompson's contribution to soil science and the sustainable management of soil systems was recognised with the award of an Order of Australia in the Queen's Birthday Honors List, 14 June 2004 at Government House, Brisbane.

On 4 April 2007, the then-Environment Minister Lindy Nelson-Carr for the Queensland government announced a scholarship program to support scientific research related to the Fraser Island World Heritage Area in honour of Thompson's work. The Cliff Thompson Memorial Scholarship program awarded $10,000 a year to a postgraduate project for one to five years duration and was offered through the Queensland EPA. Queensland National Parks & Wildlife named a patrol boat the C H Thompson in honour of Thompson's scientific contribution to the Cooloola Coast area.
