= Machine Creek, Queensland =

Machine Creek
- Suburb
- Interactive map of Machine Creek
- Coordinates: 23.8333°S 150.9397°E
- Country: Australia
- State: Queensland
- LGA: Gladstone Region
- Location: 6.5 km (4.0 mi) SW of Mount Larcom; 38 km (24 mi) W of Gladstone; 77.5 km (48.2 mi) SE of Rockhampton; 545 km (339 mi) NNW of Brisbane

Government
  - State electorate: Gladstone
  - Federal division: Flynn

Area
  - Total: 34.0 km^{2} (13.1 sq mi)

Population
  - Total: 131 (2021 census)
  - Density: 3.853/km^{2} (9.98/sq mi)
- Time zone: UTC+10:00 (AEST)
- Postcode: 4695
Suburbs around Machine Creek
Ambrose	Ambrose	Mount Larcom
Ambrose	Machine Creek	East End
Bracewell	Bracewell	East End

Machine Creek is a rural locality in the Gladstone Region, Queensland, Australia. In the 2021 census, Machine Creek had a population of 131 people.

== Geography ==
The locality presumably takes its name from the watercourse Machine Creek which flows through the south-east of the locality.

The Bruce Highway runs along the northern boundary.

Butchers Corner is a neighbourhood in the south of the locality (23.85°S 150.9333°E).

Goat Hill (23.8384°S 150.8980°E) is in the south-west of the locality and rises to 191 metres (627 ft) above sea level.

The land use is predominantly grazing on native vegetation.

== History ==
Machine Creek State School opened on 27 July 1911 under head teacher Olivia Kettle. The school closed on 10 July 1970 due to low student numbers. It was at 540 Mount Larcom Bracewell Road (north-west corner of Ambrose Bracewell Road, 23.8378°S 150.9377°E). The school building was later relocated to the Calliope River Historical Village at River Ranch.

== Demographics ==
In the 2016 census, Machine Creek had a population of 120 people.

In the 2021 census, Machine Creek had a population of 131 people.

== Education ==
There are no schools in Machine Creek. The nearest government primary schools are Ambrose State School in neighbouring Ambrose to the north and Mount Larcom State School in neighbouring Mount Larcom to the north-east. The nearest government secondary schools are Mount Larcom State School (to Year 10) in neighbouring Mount Larcom and Gladstone State High School in West Gladstone to the east.

== See also ==
- List of schools in Central Queensland
