= Darts Creek, Queensland =

Darts Creek
- Suburb
- Interactive map of Darts Creek
- Coordinates: 23.7211°S 150.9538°E
- Country: Australia
- State: Queensland
- LGA: Gladstone Region
- Location: 41.6 km (25.8 mi) WNW of Gladstone; 75.6 km (47.0 mi) SE of Rockhampton; 547 km (340 mi) NNW of Brisbane

Government
  - State electorate: Gladstone
  - Federal division: Flynn

Area
  - Total: 73.7 km^{2} (28.5 sq mi)

Population
  - Total: 165 (2021 census)
  - Density: 2.239/km^{2} (5.798/sq mi)
- Time zone: UTC+10:00 (AEST)
- Postcode: 4695
Suburbs around Darts Creek
The Narrows	The Narrows	The Narrows
Raglan	Darts Creek	Mount Larcom
Raglan	Ambrose	Mount Larcom

Darts Creek is a rural locality in the Gladstone Region, Queensland, Australia. In the 2021 census, Darts Creek had a population of 165 people.

== Geography ==
Apart from a strip of rural residential housing along Darts Creek Road, the predominant land use is grazing on native vegetation.

== Demographics ==
In the 2016 census, Darts Creek had a population of 160 people.

In the 2021 census, Darts Creek had a population of 165 people.

== Education ==
There are no schools in Darts Creek. The nearest government primary school is Ambrose State School in neighbouring Ambrose to the south. The nearest government secondary schools are Mount Larcom State School (to Year 10) in neighbouring Mount Larcom to the south-east and Gladstone State High School (to Year 12) in West Gladstone to the south-east.
