= Rundle Range National Park =

National park in Australia

- IUCN category II (national park)
- Location within Queensland
- Location: Queensland
- Nearest city: Mount Larcom
- Coordinates: 23°39′38″S 150°58′24″E
- Area: 21.70 km^{2} (8.38 sq mi)
- Established: 1993
- Governing body: Queensland Parks and Wildlife Service

Rundle Range is a national park in Central Queensland, Australia, 471 km northwest of Brisbane. The park protects portions of the Calliope River and Fitzroy River drainage basins within the Brigalow Belt bioregion.

Two rare or threatened species have been identified in the with the park. These are glossy black-cockatoo and the southern squatter pigeon.

== See also ==
- Protected areas of Queensland
