= East End, Queensland =

East End
- Suburb
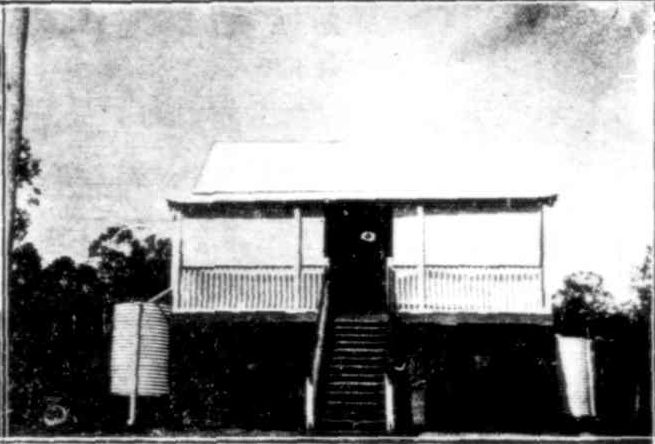
- Willmott State School, 1924

- Interactive map of East End
- Coordinates: 23.9°S 151.0055°E
- Country: Australia
- State: Queensland
- LGA: Gladstone Region
- Location: 8.0 km (5.0 mi) S of Mount Larcom; 38.8 km (24.1 mi) W of Gladstone; 80.5 km (50.0 mi) SE of Rockhampton; 542 km (337 mi) NNW of Brisbane

Government
  - State electorate: Gladstone
  - Federal division: Flynn

Area
  - Total: 184.1 km^{2} (71.1 sq mi)

Population
  - Total: 88 (2021 census)
  - Density: 0.4780/km^{2} (1.238/sq mi)
- Time zone: UTC+10:00 (AEST)
- Postcode: 4695
Suburbs around East End
Machine Creek	Mount Larcom	Aldoga
Bracewell	East End	West Stowe
Mount Alma	Wooderson	West Stowe

East End is a rural locality in the Gladstone Region, Queensland, Australia. In the 2021 census, East End had a population of 88 people.

== Geography ==
The Bruce Highway enters the locality from the south-east (West Stowe) and exits to the north (Mount Larcom).

East End railway station is a railway station on the Blackwater railway system (23.8755°S 150.9672°E).

== History ==
The area was originally known as Wilmott after a squatter called Wilmott who brought two flocks of sheep into the area in 1855. One flock was situated near a lagoon approximately 1/2 mile (0.80 km) long, now called Wilmot Lagoon (23.8519°S 150.9838°E).

Willmott State School opened on 26 April 1915. In 1936, it was renamed East End State School. The school closed in 1963. It was located at 23.8782°S 150.9439°E.

== Demographics ==
In the 2011 census, East End was included with neighbouring Bracewell; together they had a population of 462 people.

In the 2016 census, East End had a population of 59 people.

In the 2021 census, East End had a population of 88 people.

== Heritage listings ==
East End has a number of heritage-listed sites, including:

- Mount Larcombe Station Original Homestead Site, 52780 Bruce Highway (23.87877°S 151.02224°E)

== Education ==
There are no schools in East End. The nearest government primary schools are Mount Larcom State School in neighbouring Mount Larcom to the north and Yarwun State School in Yarwun to the east. The nearest government secondary schools are Mount Larcom State School (to Year 10) in neighbouring Mount Larcom, Gladstone State High School (to Year 12) in West Gladstone to the east, and Calliope State High School (to Year 12) in Calliope to the south-east.

== See also ==
- List of schools in Central Queensland
