= Ambrose, Queensland =

Ambrose
- Town
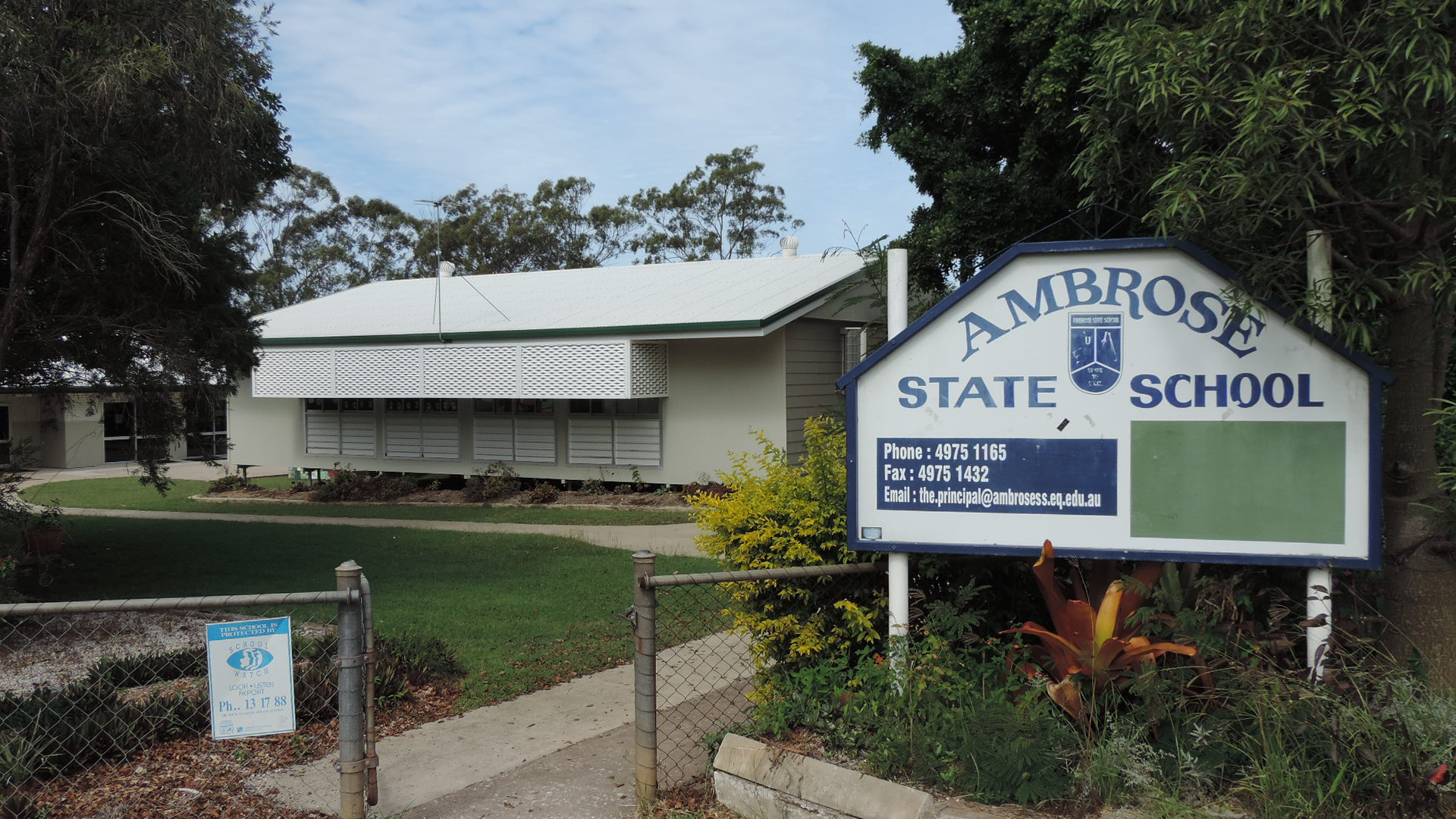
- Ambrose State School, 2014

- Interactive map of Ambrose
- Coordinates: 23.7830°S 150.9263°E
- Country: Australia
- State: Queensland
- LGA: Gladstone Region
- Location: 38.3 km (23.8 mi) NW of Gladstone; 97.2 km (60.4 mi) SE of Rockhampton; 545 km (339 mi) NNW of Brisbane

Government
  - State electorate: Gladstone
  - Federal division: Flynn

Area
  - Total: 63.1 km^{2} (24.4 sq mi)

Population
  - Total: 217 (2021 census)
  - Density: 3.439/km^{2} (8.907/sq mi)
- Time zone: UTC+10:00 (AEST)
- Postcode: 4695
Localities around Ambrose
Raglan	Raglan	Darts Creek
Raglan	Ambrose	Mount Larcom
Raglan	Bracewell	Machine Creek

Ambrose is a rural town and locality in the Gladstone Region, Queensland, Australia. In the 2021 census, the locality of Ambrose had a population of 217 people.

== Geography ==
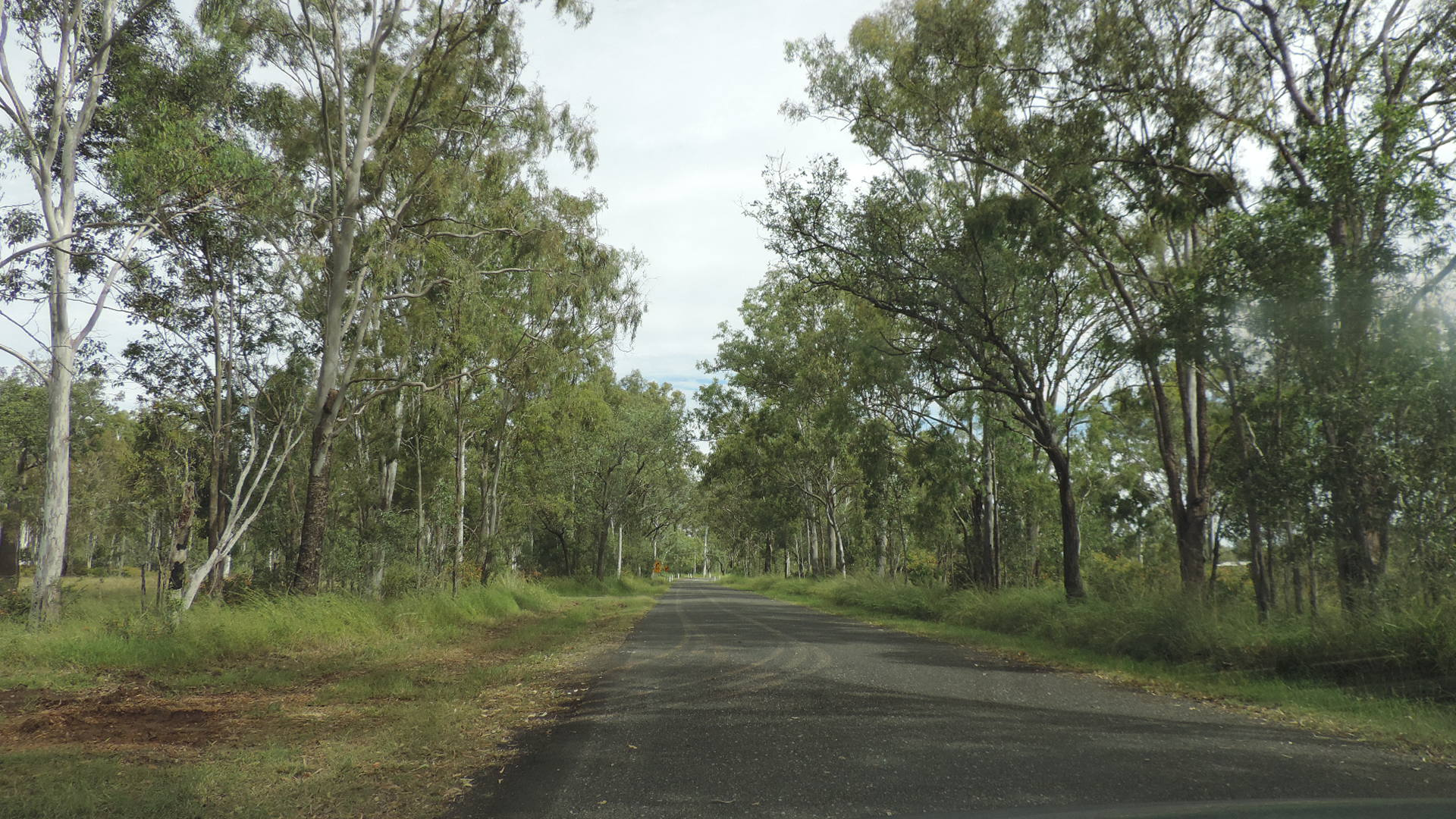
Rural scenery, Ambrose, 2014

The Bruce Highway and North Coast railway pass through the northern part of the locality; the town centre is close to both. Most of the land is in the locality is used for grazing cattle.

== History ==
The town is named after Henry Gilbert Ambrose (1876–1950), an early settler in the area.

Ambrose Provisional School opened in December 1913 with 12 students. On 1 December 1914, it became Ambrose State School. It celebrated its centenary in 2014.

Langmorn Creek Crossing Provisional School opened on 20 October 1915 but closed circa 31 January 1916. It reopened as Langmorn Provisional School circa January 1926. On 1 January 1931, it became Langmorn State School. It closed on 26 October 1941, but reopened on 26 October 1944. It closed finally on 11 May 1962. It was at 187 Langmorn School Road (23.8185°S 150.8823°E).

Ambrose Post Office opened on 1 November 1915 (a receiving office had been open since 1910) and closed in 1977.

Hut Creek State School opened on 17 November 1921 and closed on 28 February 1945. It was on Hut Creek Road (approx 23.8477°S 150.8985°E).

== Demographics ==
In the 2011 census, the locality of Ambrose had a population of 545 people.

In the 2016 census, the locality of Ambrose had a population of 218 people.

In the 2021 census, the locality of Ambrose had a population of 217 people.

== Education ==
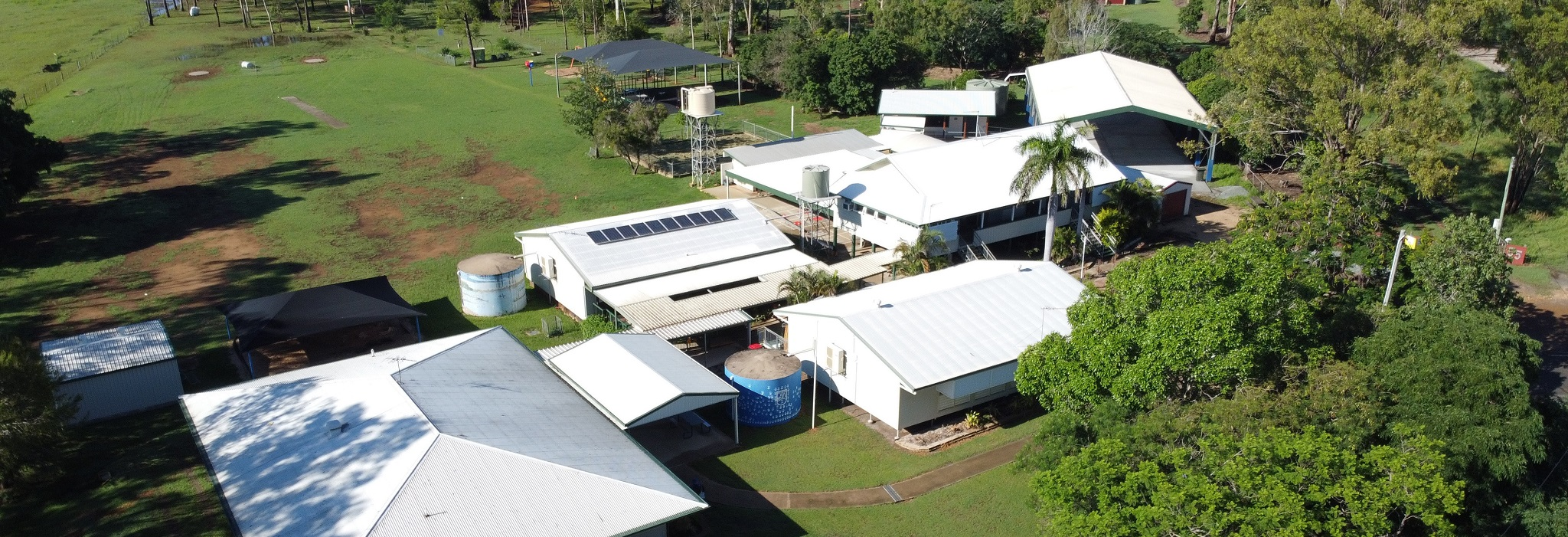
Ambrose State School, circa 2022

Ambrose State School is a government primary (Prep-6) school for boys and girls at 39 Gentle Annie Road (23.7864°S 150.9218°E). In 2017, the school had an enrolment of 84 students with 6 teachers (5 full-time equivalent) and 7 non-teaching staff (4 full-time equivalent). In 2018, the school had an enrolment of 75 students with 6 teachers (5 full-time equivalent) and 7 non-teaching staff (4 full-time equivalent).

There are no secondary schools in Ambrose. The nearest government secondary school is Mount Larcom State School (to Year 10) in neighbouring Mount Larcom to the east. For secondary schooling to Year 12, the nearest government secondary school in Gladstone State High School in West Gladstone to the south-east.

== Community groups ==
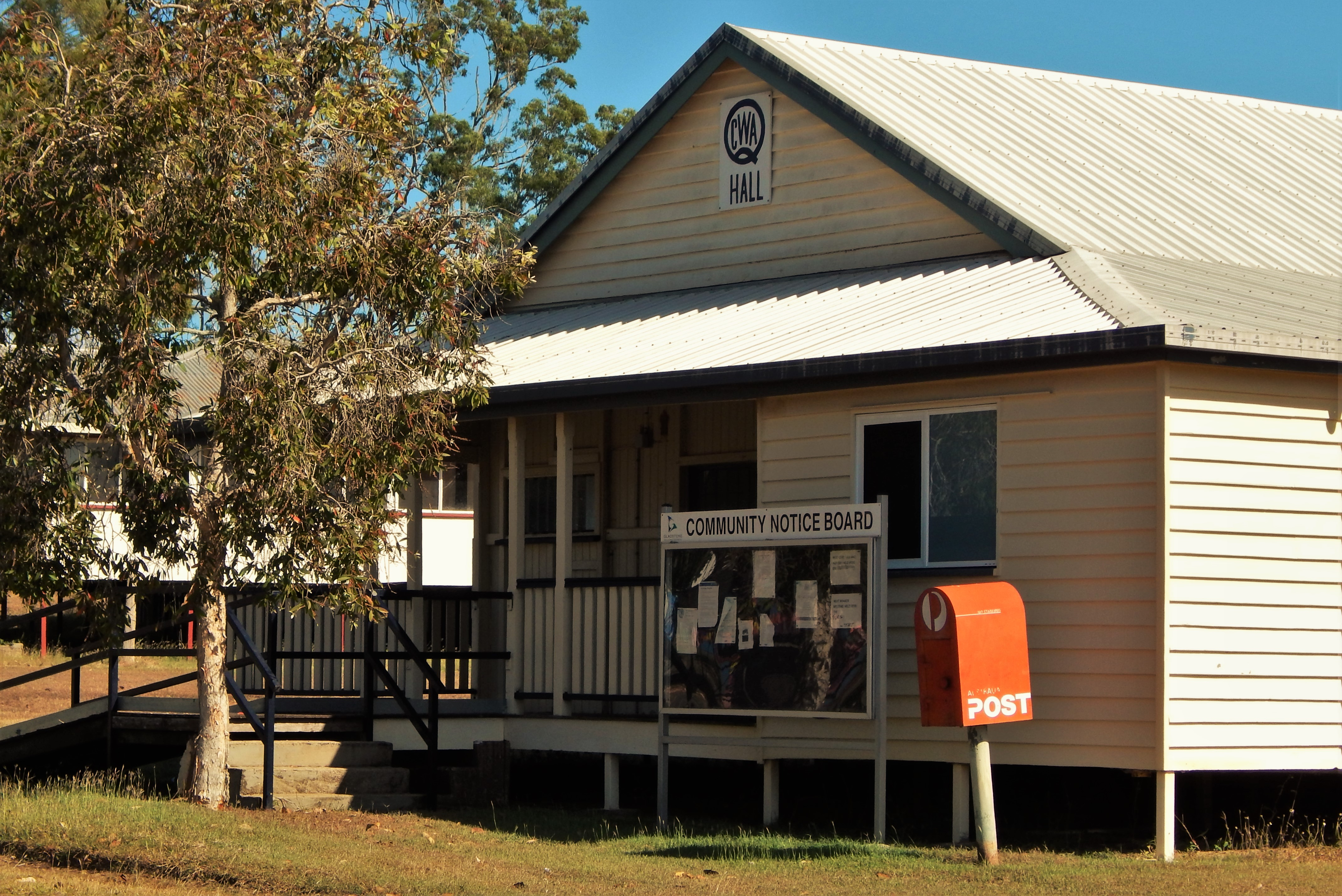
Ambrose QCWA Hall, 2022

The Ambrose branch of the Queensland Country Women's Association meets at the QCWA Hall at 36 Gentle Annie Road (23.7859°S 150.9224°E).

== Notable people ==
Notable people from or having lived in Ambrose include:

- Clifford Harry Thompson, geomorphologist and CSIRO principal research scientist

== See also ==
- List of schools in Central Queensland
