= Allenstown State School =

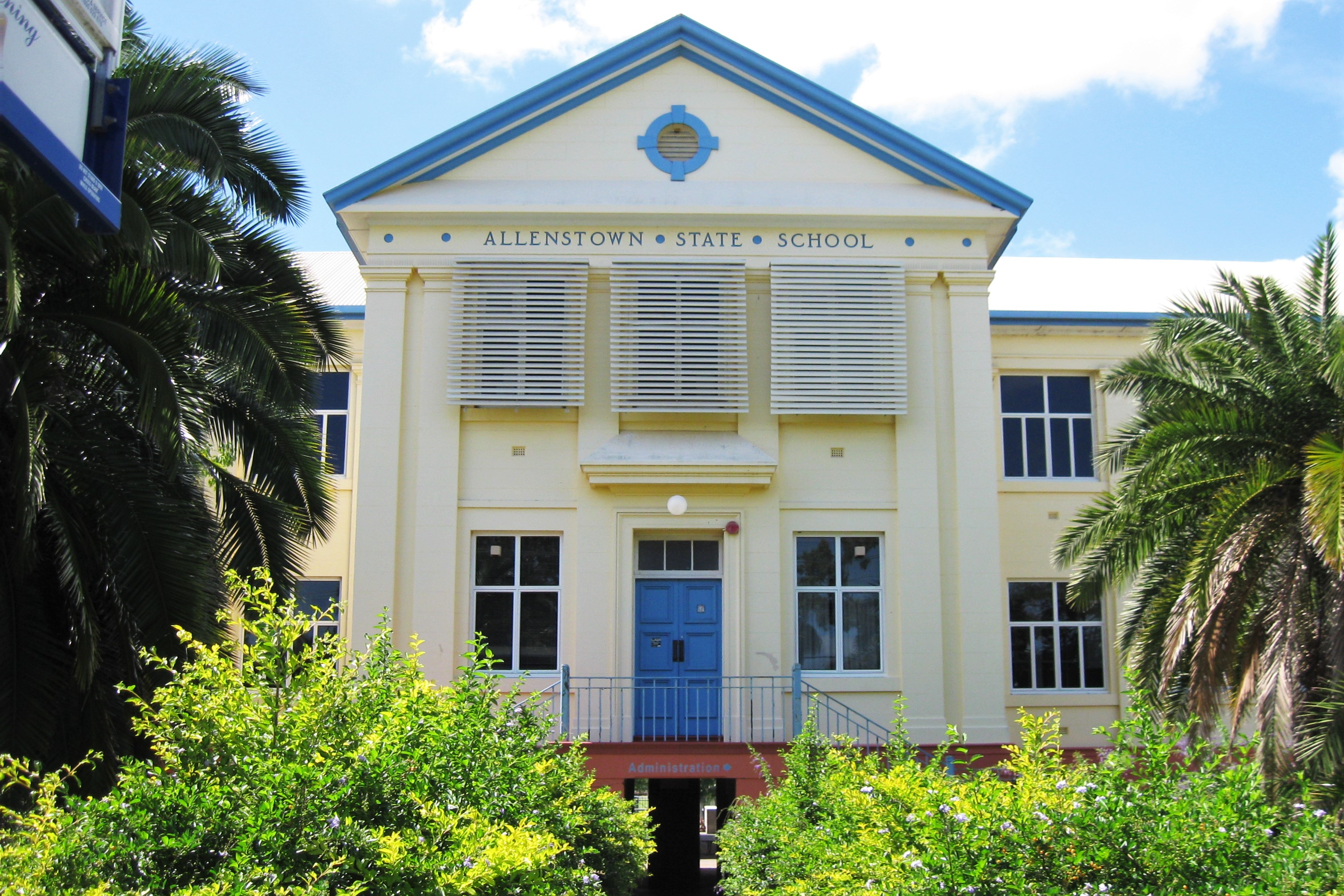
- Allenstown State School, 2013

- Location within Queensland
- 23.3917°S 150.5044°E
- Location: 13–33 Upper Dawson Road, Allenstown, Rockhampton, Rockhampton Region, Queensland, Australia

History
- Design period: 1870s–1890s (Late 19th century)
- Built: 1884, 1884, 1890–1892, 1936, 1939

Site notes
- Architectural style: Classicism

Queensland Heritage Register
- Official name: Allenstown State School
- Type: state heritage
- Designated: 20 September 2019
- Reference no.: 650232
- Type: Education, research, scientific facility: School-state
- Theme: Educating Queenslanders: Providing primary schooling
- Builders: Department of Public Works

Allenstown State School is a heritage-listed state school at 13–33 Upper Dawson Road, Allenstown, Rockhampton, Rockhampton Region, Queensland, Australia. It was built in 1884 by Department of Public Works. It was added to the Queensland Heritage Register on 20 September 2019.

== History ==
Allenstown State School was established on its current site in 1877. The school is important in demonstrating the evolution of state education and its associated architecture. It retains:

- two timber playsheds built 1884
- the Clayton Memorial, a sandstone monument to a teacher built by 1892
- a swimming pool built in 1931
- a front garden built by 1932
- a playing field created in 1936
- a substantial Depression-era brick school building built in 1939
- a parade ground created by 1948

The school is a prominent landmark in the area and has a strong association with the surrounding community.

The Rockhampton area is traditionally part of the lands of the Darumbal people. After the short-lived 1858 Canoona gold rush, Rockhampton was proclaimed a town and declared a "port of entry" in that year. Emerging as an important regional centre, the Municipality of Rockhampton was proclaimed in 1860 and it remained the principal port for central Queensland for nearly a century.

Allenstown, a suburb 2 kilometres (1.2 mi) south of the centre of Rockhampton was named after William Allen, a merchant and leading elder of the Primitive Methodist Church. Allen purchased, subdivided, and sold land here in 1864. Houses, a store, and Patrick Egan's Merry Jig Hotel followed. By 1873, the area had developed to the point that there were 50–60 school-age children, who walked between 1 and 2 miles (1.6 and 3.2 km) to the already overcrowded Rockhampton Central State School in William Street, Rockhampton (closed in 1973).

The establishment of schools was considered an essential step in the development of early communities and integral to their success. People from the surrounding community often donated land and labour for a school's construction and the school community contributed to maintenance and development. Schools became a community focus, a symbol of progress, and a source of pride, with enduring connections formed with past pupils, parents, and teachers.

In February 1873, a school reserve of nine acres, 1 rood and 16 perches (3.78ha) was declared at Allenstown. A school committee of Rockhampton community members was formed in July 1875 and fundraising from the community began. Tenders were called for a timber-framed teaching building and teacher's residence in October 1876, and Allenstown State School opened on 16 July 1877. As student numbers immediately outstripped the building's capacity, a wing was added to the existing building in 1879.

In 1884, two playsheds were built at Allenstown State School. The Queensland education system recognised the importance of play in the school curriculum. Playsheds were standard designs, free-standing shelters with fixed timber seating between posts and doubled as teaching space when required. These structures were timber-framed and generally open-sided with hipped roofs, and became a characteristic feature of early Queensland timber schools. Although the school had sourced an original design for a long "double" playshed from a Rockhampton architect in 1879, for both girls and boys, the Department of Public Instruction did not approve the design and recommended two playsheds (40' x 22'6"/12.2m x 6.8m) of standard hipped roof design be built, supplied by the Department of Public Works (DPW). The two were built by Rockhampton contractor Wiley Holmes at the rear (east) of the buildings with one (for girls) near the north boundary and one (for boys) near the south. In 2019, they are two of four of the oldest-known extant playsheds of their type in Queensland; the others being at Toowoomba South State School and Hemmant State School, all built in 1884.

The school grounds at Allenstown were beautified by trees, gardens, and playing fields from at least 1890. School grounds were an important component of Queensland state schools. The early and continuing commitment to play-based education, particularly in primary school, resulted in the provision of outdoor play space and sporting facilities, such as playing fields and tennis courts. Trees and gardens were planted to shade and beautify schools, often for Arbor Day celebrations. Aesthetically designed gardens were encouraged by regional inspectors, and educators believed gardening and Arbor Days instilled in young minds the value of hard work and activity. To celebrate the first Arbor Day in 1890 at Allenstown State School, 27 trees (jacarandas and bamboo) were planted and small garden plots were added along Upper Dawson Road. Students cultivated the plots and the best kept were awarded prizes at end of year celebrations from 1891.

A memorial was added to the garden at the front of the school after the drowning death of teacher William Francis Nassau Clayton in 1890. Clayton drowned in a boating accident off Peak Island in Keppel Bay on 2 January 1890. The school principal Frederick Smith and student Patrick (Walter) Mooney survived the accident. By 1892, the sandstone monument was located "in this garden [on Upper Dawson Road]...in front of the entrance to it", and comprised a pillar and urn, surmounted by a fountain, approximately 8 ft (2.5m) tall, funded by Rockhampton school teachers and Allenstown students. It was later moved a number of times within the school grounds, standing in three locations in the front garden until c. 1953, and then standing in at least two locations behind the school buildings, before it was moved to stand at the rear of Block A, near Block C, by 2018. Between 2006 and 2018, a new pedestal was carved for the monument's urn, to match the original. At some time, the fountain was removed.

The area continued to develop in the early 20th century. Transport improved from 1909, with the introduction of an electric tramway system in Rockhampton (the only regional city in Queensland to have a tram system), with one route having a terminus in Upper Dawson Road near the school. Allenstown State School expanded. New timber wings were added in 1899 and 1909, and the school buildings were raised and asphalt laid underneath in 1907. From July 1913, the school offered high school classes, which appears to have been a short-term venture. In 1915 a new building, an open-air annexe (Block C in 2019), was opened to accommodate infants classes. The 51 ft by 25 ft open-air annexe included a wall and a verandah on its south side, with the other three walls divided into 12 sections, with rollers for canvas blinds. Erected by Pugh Bros, it cost £814.

The front garden was maintained and enhanced over time. Trees were planted here for Arbor Day in 1911; the school won the district's second prize in 1911, and equal first in 1913, in the Department of Education's annual "State School Gardens" competition. In 1912, there were still shallow waterholes running north–south across the grounds, to the east of the fence located just east of the playsheds and toilets. The remainder of the grounds were unfenced at this time. By 1922, the garden beds had been removed. From 1926, the Allenstown State School Help Association raised funds for school improvements, through three years of fetes held at the school. These improvements included "laying out a garden in the front of the school". The Curator of the Rockhampton Botanic Gardens offered his advice, and work commenced in early 1927. The garden space was enlarged, and trees and shrubs were planted, donated by the Mayor of Rockhampton through the Botanic Gardens Trust. The garden is shown in a sketch dated 10 May 1929. It shows the front garden stretched along the entire front of the site and having a symmetrical layout of long rectangles with narrow flowerbed borders and a central path from Upper Dawson Road to the buildings, but does not show any central symmetrical cluster palms. However, photographs of Block A in the late 1930s appear to show palms, similar to those existing in 2019, in the front garden either side of the central path.

There were other grounds improvements in the 1920s and early 1930s. By 1929, sports' facilities for the school's 630 students included ground "marked for football", a concrete cricket pitch, two basketball courts and an ant-bed tennis court. A school swimming pool opened in early 1931, and two red coloured concrete paths with black and white mosaic tile insets was laid by February 1932, forming a T-shape through the front garden and from Caroline Street to Margaret Street.

By the end of 1934, the Department of Public Instruction had approved a new brick building to replace the existing teaching buildings - except two, which were to be relocated within the site to accommodate infants' classes. The construction of substantial brick state school buildings during the 1930s, in prosperous or growing centres, was part of the Queensland Government's commitment to provide unemployment relief during the Great Depression.

Commencing in 1929 and extending well into the 1930s, the Great Depression caused a dramatic reduction of building work in Queensland and brought private building work to a standstill. In response, the Queensland Government provided relief work for unemployed Queenslanders. Extensive funding was given for improvements to school grounds, including fencing and levelling ground for play areas, begun by mid-1930. This work created many large school playing fields, which prior to this period were mostly cleared of trees but not landscaped. These playing fields became a standard inclusion in Queensland state schools and a characteristic element. At Allenstown, relief workers were employed to fill the lower (eastern) area of the school reserve during 1936 to form a large, levelled playing field. In the school's centenary year this was named the Tom Hogan playing field, after a former teacher and deputy principal of the school from 1952 to 1980.

From 1932, the Queensland Government also embarked on an ambitious and important public building program to provide impetus to the economy during the Great Depression. The building program was designed to promote the employment of local skilled workers, the purchase of local building materials, and the production of commodious, low maintenance buildings, which would be a long-term asset to Queensland, such as large brick state school buildings The building programme included: government offices, schools, colleges, university buildings, courthouses and police stations, hospitals and asylums, and gaols.

The Department of Public Works (DPW) and Department of Public Instruction were extremely enthusiastic about the 1930s brick school buildings, which were considered monuments to progress embodying the most modern principles of the ideal education environment. These Depression-era brick school buildings form a recognisable and important type of school architecture, exhibiting many common characteristics. Frequently, they were two storeys of classrooms above an open undercroft and built to accommodate up to 1000 students. They adopted a symmetrical plan form and often had a prominent central entry. The plan arrangement was similar to that of timber buildings, being only one classroom deep, and accessed by a long straight verandah or corridor. Some classrooms were commonly divided by folding timber partitions and the undercroft was used as covered play space, storage, ablutions, and other functions. Almost all Depression-era brick school buildings faced the primary boundary road, regardless of solar orientation.

The new Depression-era brick school building at Allenstown State School, to accommodate 512 students, was designed by the DPW. Construction commenced in late January 1938 and was finished in 1939. Built in place of the earlier timber buildings but retaining the front gardens and its path, the building was a symmetrical, three-storey structure facing Upper Dawson Road in a neo-classical style. It accommodated open play spaces on the ground floor, with ablutions in single-storey blocks at both ends. Classrooms on the first and second floors - six per floor - were accessed by an enclosed corridor running along the front (western side). An entrance bay with branching stair projected at the centre of the front elevation, accommodating an entrance hall and teacher's rooms on the first floor and a smaller, seventh classroom and teacher's room on the second floor. On both levels, some classrooms could be connected for student assembly via folding partitions (four classrooms on the first floor, three on the second floor) and one first floor classroom had a raised floor and acted as a stage at the end of the assembly space. Cloakrooms and stairwells were at each end of the building.

The building was completed with rendered walls and had a red fibre-cement corrugated sheet-clad roof with a tall ventilation fleche. Construction materials were sourced locally wherever possible: the bricks were from JG O'Shanesy (Kabra brickworks) and steel and sand was locally sourced. The exterior was stucco scored to mimic ashlar, and the description of the building on opening shows its "cream plaster walls and red fibro-concrete roof".

The new brick building was officially opened on 29 July 1939 by James Larcombe, MLA for Rockhampton, Minister for Transport and Acting Minister for Mines. A brass plaque bearing a portrait of the school committee patron, WH Rudd, was unveiled. Larcombe's speech praised the "splendid" new building as "a fine landmark [that] raised the prestige of the Allenstown district" and symbolised "the dignity, the power and the beauty of education", particularly in contrast to the "ignorant and barbaric" actions occurring in Europe at the time. The opening ceremony included a very successful and well-attended fete organised by the school staff and students. The building had been constructed using day labour, and by its opening had cost £21,691 - with a further £150 required to complete the work. The building was occupied after the August vacation, 1939. In 2019 it is called Block A.

To accommodate construction of Block A, the three oldest timber school buildings were removed from the site but the 1909 building was retained and moved slightly to the east, behind Block A. The northern playshed was probably relocated at this time, and was re-erected at the centre of the school grounds, south of the swimming pool. In 1940, the 1909 wing was moved again, along with the 1915 open-air annexe (Block C), northeast to face Caroline Street. Both timber buildings were rotated and reconfigured for use by 180 infants. The open-air annex was rotated so that its southern verandah was on the north side. A verandah was added to the west end of the annexe after 1947, and c. 1955 a classroom extension was added to its east end.

During World War II (WWII), cotton was grown on the land at the corner of Caroline Street and Upper Dawson Road as well as the playing field at the eastern half of the site; the cotton was sold to donate to patriotic funds. Trenches were also dug at the school during the war, while camouflage nets were made in Block A . The Allenstown State School Help Association decided to insert brass tablets in the main building to commemorate staff and past pupils who had served in both world wars. On Friday nights in summer after the war, the swimming pool was used by the Allenstown Swimming Club, and in winter a boxing ring was installed over the pool for matches open to the public. The swimming pool had a new concrete floor lining added in 1990 and was relined in 2007, but it retains its original size, which was noted as 75 ft by 25 ft (23m by 7.6m).

After WWII, the grounds were regularly improved and by 1948 a parade ground had been established at the rear of Block A. Characteristic of Queensland schools, the parade ground was a large open area for outdoor assemblies of the student body conducted by school staff. In c. 1953 a circular garden with central flagpole and memorial plaque was added at the southeast corner of the parade ground to celebrate Queen Elizabeth II's coronation. The parade ground surface was bituminised in c. 1955.

Allenstown State School celebrated its 75th anniversary in 1952 with a well-attended day of speeches delivered on the parade ground, a concert, and games. Soon after, the front garden was adjusted by staff members to have symmetrical lawns and gardens with a central path, building on the existing 1930s layout.

Over time changes were made to Block A. The cloakrooms at both ends of the second floor were changed in 1969, with partitions added to form storerooms. By this time, a tuckshop had been added in the ground floor open play area. In 1972, a library was opened in one first floor classrooms of Block A, called the Pat O'Shanesy Memorial Library. By 1978 toilets were added to the second floor cloakrooms with windows cut into the side walls. In 1978 the folding partitions were removed from the second floor, bagracks were added to the corridor on both classroom levels, and some plasterboard partitions were added to the first floor to form a staff room. This staffroom had expanded to absorb a neighbouring classroom by 1997, when the second floor included a new central wall and the removal of other walls; and the insertion of concertina doors, creating two large rooms divisible into four classrooms. Block A was reroofed in 1989. Changes to the first floor from 1997 created administration offices in the central part of the building, which became a single space in 1998.

The Rockhampton community has celebrated the long history of the Allenstown State School. On 16 July 1977, the school held an 8-day long celebration including a fete and open day and fireworks. A large commemorative stone with plaque was unveiled in the front garden by Nev Hewitt, MLA for Auburn; between 2009 and 2019, the stone was moved slightly west in the front garden and rotated 180 degrees. The school also published a centenary book. In 1998 a plaque was added at the swimming pool, which was renamed the David Coughran Memorial Swimming Pool, in recognition of a teacher who had taught at the school from 1972 to 1997. The school marked its 125th anniversary in 2002, with a number of celebrations held between May and July. The school also published a commemorative history tour of the site in 2009.

In 2019, the school continues to operate from its original site. It retains its two 1884 playsheds; the Clayton Memorial (by 1892); the 1930s swimming pool, front garden, playing field, and Depression-era brick school building; and parade ground (by 1948). Allenstown State School is important to Rockhampton as a key social focus for the community, and includes memorials to prominent community members associated with the school. Generations of students have been taught there, and many social events have been held in the school's grounds and buildings since its establishment.

== Description ==
Allenstown State School occupies a 3.75ha site covering a full city block in Allenstown, a central suburb of Rockhampton. The flat, rectangular site comprises a complex of teaching buildings at the western end and a playing field at the eastern end.

=== Front garden (by 1932) ===
The front garden is the principal entry to the school and it forms a forecourt and open setting for Block A. West to east it extends from the front boundary of the school on Upper Dawson Road, to the front (west) elevation of Block A. North to south it extends approximately 35m from a netball court to an administration building (built 2007).

=== Block A (1939) ===
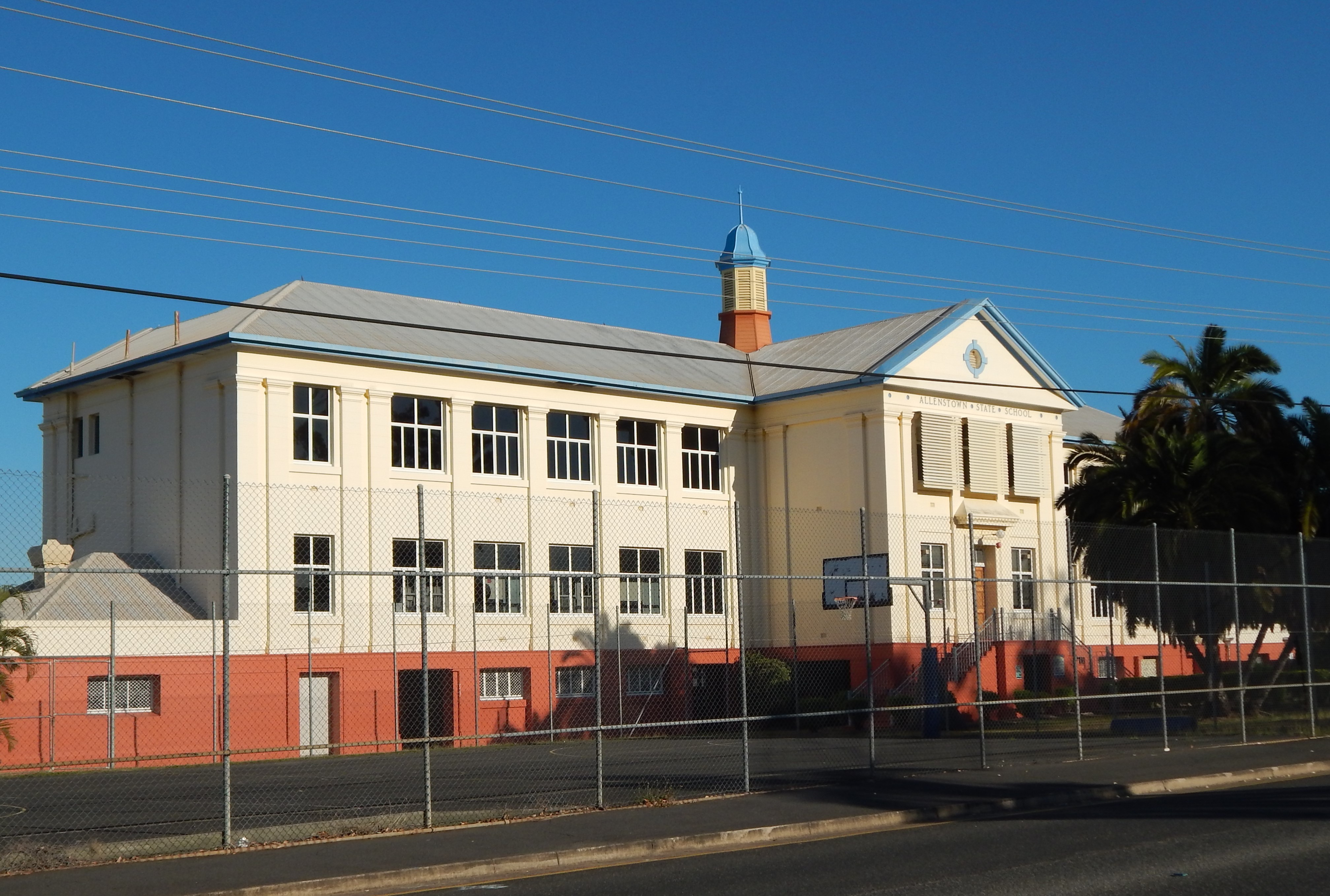
Block A, 2021

Block A is the main building, standing centrally at the front of the site and facing west across the front garden to Upper Dawson Road. It is a three-storey, masonry teaching building, long and narrow, with its long sides facing west and east. It has a hipped roof and features a tall, central ventilation flèche.

The front elevation is symmetrically composed and features classically influenced design elements. It has a prominent centred entrance bay with a tall gable pediment and pilasters, emulating a temple front, and first floor entrance doors accessed by branching stairs.

Single-storey sections at both ends of the building accommodate toilets. The ground floor is largely open for a play area, accessed through a series of large openings along both long sides. The first and second floors accommodate a series of classrooms accessed by a long corridor on the western side and stairwells at both ends of the building.

=== Parade ground (by 1948) ===
The parade ground is a rectangular flat space on the eastern side of Block A, measuring approximately 50m by 19m. It extends the entire length of Block A (excluding the single-storey toilet blocks), and Block A's ground floor open play area connects directly to the parade ground though a series of openings in Block A on this side. It stretches east to Block C, south to Block D, and north to Block B.

=== Clayton Memorial (by 1892) ===
The Clayton Memorial comprises a stone urn standing on a stone pillar with inscription. It stands in the parade ground.

=== Playsheds (1884) ===
Two playsheds stand in the school grounds. These are open-sided, timber-framed, 10-post shelters with concrete floors and hip roofs. One stands on the southern edge of the school site near Margaret Street and another stands in the centre of the school site, south of the swimming pool. Both are highly intact.

=== Swimming pool (1931) ===
The swimming pool is a rectangular, concrete in-ground swimming pool standing to the northeast of the parade ground, near Caroline Street.

=== Playing field (1936) ===
The playing field is a large, open, grassed, flat area at the eastern half of the school site. It is fringed by shade trees planted near the school boundary, contributing to the attractive landscape character of the field.

=== Views ===
Block A is a prominent building in the relatively low scale neighbourhood and is highly visible from all sides, contributing to its landmark quality in the flat landscape of the surrounding area.

== Heritage listing ==
Allenstown State School was listed on the Queensland Heritage Register on 20 September 2019 having satisfied the following criteria.

The place is important in demonstrating the evolution or pattern of Queensland's history.

Allenstown State School, established in 1877, is important in demonstrating the evolution of state education and its associated architecture in Queensland. The place retains excellent, representative examples of a Depression-era brick school building (Block A, 1939) and two playsheds (1884), which were architectural responses to prevailing government educational philosophies, set in landscaped grounds with gardens, memorials, and assembly and sport areas, including: a swimming pool (1931); front garden (by 1932); playing field (1936); and parade ground (by 1948).

The place is important in demonstrating the Queensland Government's state-wide relief work programs during the 1930s that stimulated the economy and provided work for men unemployed as a result of the Great Depression. Constructed using relief labour, Block A and the playing field are representative examples of the type of work performed under the program.

The place is important in demonstrating the principal characteristics of a particular class of cultural places.

Block A is an excellent, substantial, and intact example of a Depression-era brick school building, and is important in demonstrating the principal characteristics of the type. These include: a handsome edifice standing at the front of the school; symmetrical three-storey form with two levels of classrooms and teachers' rooms above an undercroft of open play spaces; a linear layout of the classroom levels with rooms accessed by a corridor; loadbearing masonry construction; prominent projecting central entrance bay; and high quality design to provide superior educational environments that focus on abundant natural light and ventilation. It demonstrates the use of stylistic features of its era, which determined its roof form, joinery, and decorative treatment.

The playsheds are excellent, early, and intact examples of Department of Public Works' school playsheds and are important in demonstrating the principal characteristics of the type. These include its: free-standing, open-sided shelter form; hipped timber-framed roof supported on braced timber posts; and timber perimeter seat.

The place is important because of its aesthetic significance.

Through its elegant composition of formal and decorative elements, substantial size and materials, and fine craftsmanship, the intact Block A has aesthetic significance due to its expressive attributes, by which the Department of Public Works sought to convey the concepts of progress and permanence.

The place is also significant for its streetscape contribution and as a landmark within the flat landscape of the area. Viewed from Upper Dawson Road, and the adjoining Caroline and Margaret Streets, Block A's assertive massing, classically influenced design, and elegant composition are appreciable. Block A is set back from Dawson Road behind a formal and symmetrical front garden of the same period and both contribute to the school's dignified and prominent presence in the streetscape.

Important views to Block A and its fleche from within the grounds, including open, axial views from the playing field, reinforce the dominant presence of Block A within the school.

The place has a strong or special association with a particular community or cultural group for social, cultural or spiritual reasons.

Allenstown State School has a strong and ongoing association with past and present pupils, parents, staff members, and the wider Rockhampton community. Established in 1877, initially through the efforts and fundraising of the community, this early Rockhampton school has sustained its use for more than 140 years. The place is important for its contribution to the educational development of Rockhampton, with generations of children taught at the school, and has served as a prominent venue for social interaction and community focus, including memorials to school staff members, and public celebrations of the school's anniversaries throughout its history. The strength of association is demonstrated through repeated community volunteer action, donations, and an active Parents and Citizens Association.
