= Targinnie =

- Suburb
- Interactive map of Targinnie
- Coordinates: 23.7269°S 151.1019°E
- Country: Australia
- State: Queensland
- LGA: Gladstone Region
- Location: 21.7 km (13.5 mi) WNW of Gladstone CBD; 98.3 km (61.1 mi) SE of Rockhampton; 556 km (345 mi) NNW of Brisbane

Government
  - State electorate: Gladstone
  - Federal division: Flynn

Area
  - Total: 158.5 km^{2} (61.2 sq mi)

Population
  - Total: 31 (2021 census)
  - Density: 0.196/km^{2} (0.507/sq mi)
- Time zone: UTC+10:00 (AEST)
- Postcode: 4694
Suburbs around Targinnie
The Narrows	Curtis Island	Curtis Island
Mount Larcom	Targinnie	Curtis Island
Aldoga	Yarwun	Curtis Island

Targinnie is a coastal locality in the Gladstone Region, Queensland, Australia. In the 2021 census, Targinnie had a population of 31 people.

== Geography ==
Although a coastal locality, Targinnie is separated from the Coral Sea by Curtis Island with the shallow passage between Targinnie and the island being The Narrows.

== History ==
The locality takes its name from the Targinia pastoral run, created in 1863. The second settler in the area later sought to undertake sheep farming, adding to existing fruit growing.

Mining for ironstone lode was proposed in 1906, after discovery of magnetite in April 1902. Gold was being extracted in the area by 1908, after initial prospecting in 1901 and the associated 1876 Langmorn and Ulam goldfields.

The locality was served by the Targinie railway station by 1904, although there was a local complaint of no secured building for uncollected goods received by train.

Targinnie Provisional School opened in 1902. In 1903 it was renamed Pyealley Provisional School. It closed in 1905.

Targinnie Goldfield Provisional School opened in 1903. On 1 January 1909 it became Targinnie Goldfield State School. It closed in 1918. Targinnie State School opened on 19 March 1923 and closed on 13 December 1968.

Targinnie residents socialised with the Yarwun community for dances and sports such as cricket as well as a joint business chambers such as the Yarwun Targinnie Fruit Association for producers. In one 1909 cricket match of men versus women, the males bowled, batted and fielded left handed, and used axe handles as the cricket bats.

Additional to dairying, in the 1930s one crop being grown in the area was tomatoes. This added to the mangoes, pineapples, passion fruit, and citrus produce.

Within the Shire of Calliope, the township commenced raising moneys in May 1934, to officially open a public hall on 19 December 1936. Measuring 30 feet (9.1 m) x 40 feet (12 m) size with 10 feet (3.0 m) walls, with weather boards and fibro-cement walls, the floor was spotted gum timber with a 10 feet (3.0 m) full-width verandah.

The town also had at one time the Targinnie Sports Club, a cemetery, and a Country Women's Association (with Yarwun).

Old Believer's Church was built in 1995 from timber. It was established by group of Old Believers who had migrated from Harbin, China in the 1950s. It has subsequently closed. It was at Targinnie Road (23.803313°S 151.1121°E).

On 15 October 2010, the locality name which was originally called after the Parish of Targinie (one 'n') was amended to reflect the common usage of two 'n's.

== Demographics ==
In the 2016 census, Targinnie had a population of 68 people.

In the 2021 census, Targinnie had a population of 31 people.

== Education ==
There are no schools in Targinnie. The nearest government primary schools are Yarwun State School in neighbouring Yarwun to the south and Mount Larcom State School in neighbouring Mount Larcom to the west. The nearest government secondary schools are Mount Larcom State School (to Year 10) and Gladstone State High School (to Year 12) in West Gladstone to the south-east.

== Facilities ==
Targinnie Cemetery is at 433 Targinnie Road (23.8044°S 151.1132°E). Burials in this cemetery took place between 1922 and 1938. This cemetery is closed to further burials.
