= Mount Larcom, Queensland =

Mount Larcom
- Town
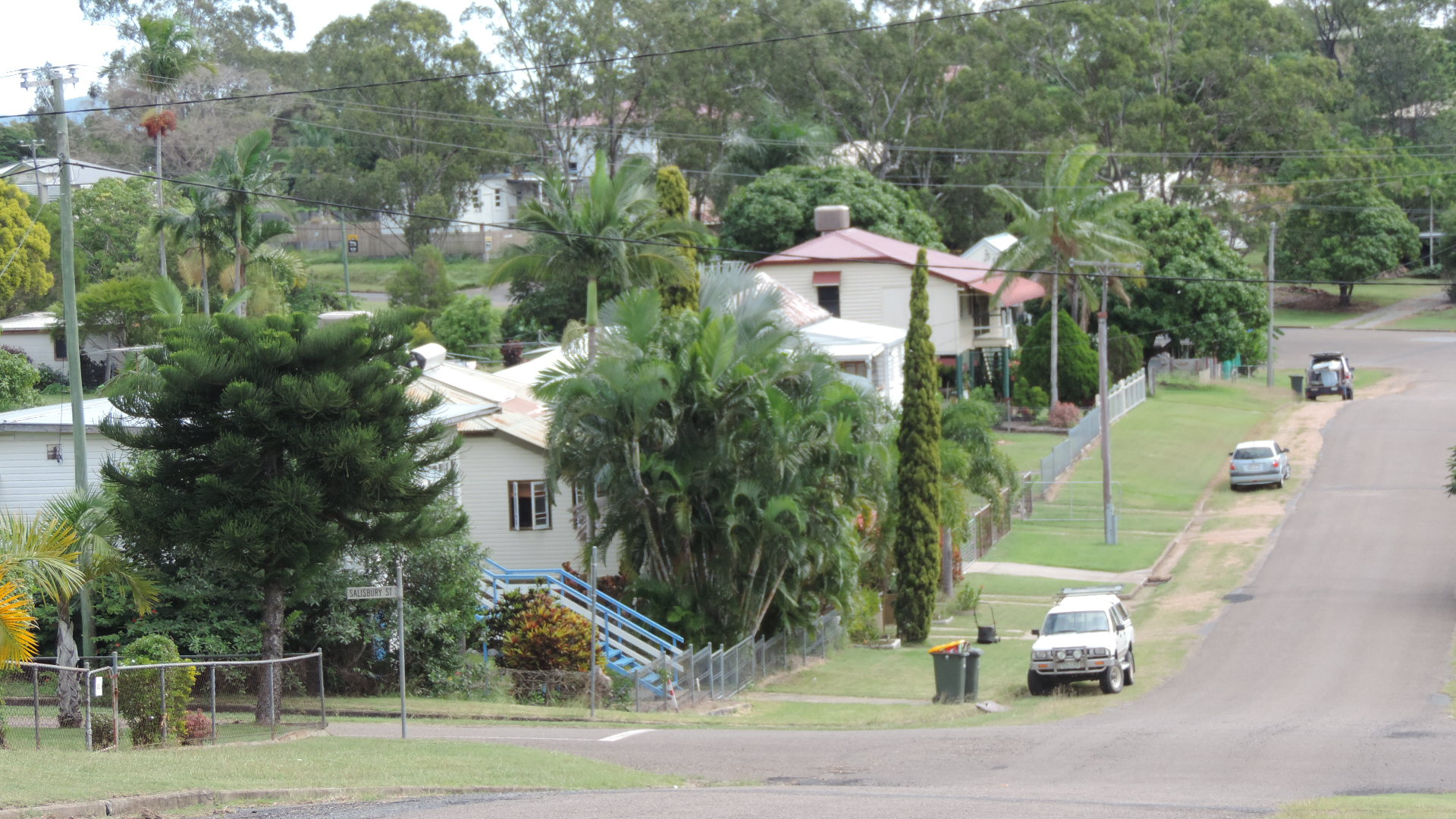
- Gladstone Street, 2014

- Interactive map of Mount Larcom
- Coordinates: 23.8102°S 150.9786°E
- Country: Australia
- State: Queensland
- LGA: Gladstone Region
- Location: 32.3 km (20.1 mi) WNW of Gladstone; 76 km (47 mi) SE of Rockhampton; 543 km (337 mi) NNW of Brisbane

Government
  - State electorate: Gladstone
  - Federal division: Flynn

Area
  - Total: 84.3 km^{2} (32.5 sq mi)

Population
  - Total: 332 (2021 census)
  - Density: 3.938/km^{2} (10.200/sq mi)
- Time zone: UTC+10:00 (AEST)
- Postcode: 4695
Localities around Mount Larcom
Darts Creek	The Narrows	Targinnie
Ambrose	Mount Larcom	Targinnie
Machine Creek	East End	Aldoga

Mount Larcom is the name of a mountain, a rural town and locality in the Gladstone Region, Queensland, Australia. In the 2021 census, the locality of Mount Larcom had a population of 332 people.

== Geography ==
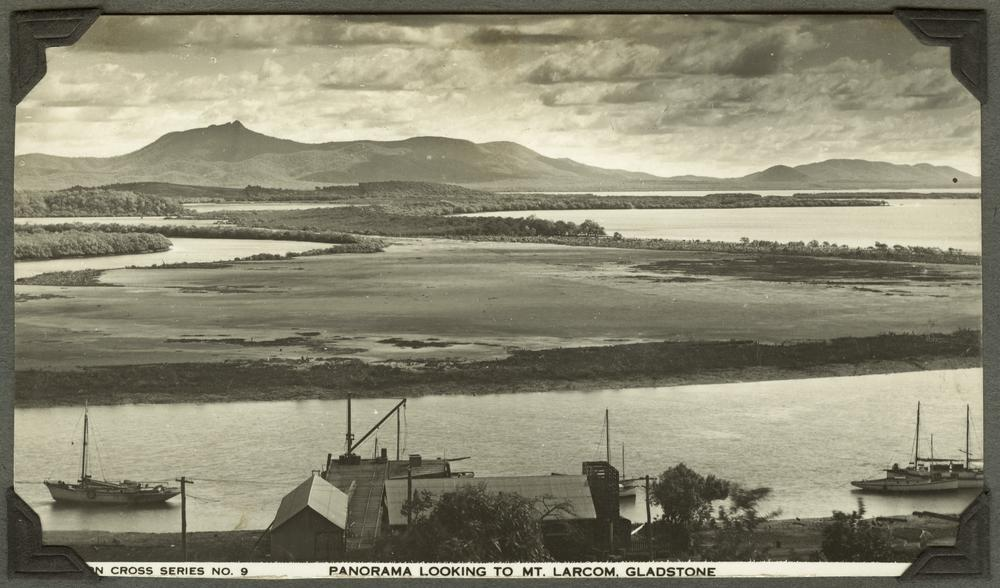
Panoramic view looking towards Mt. Larcom, Gladstone, 1937-1938

The town is in the south-western corner of the locality is at the junction of the Bruce Highway and Gladstone–Mount Larcom Road (State Route 58) approximately 70 kilometres (43 mi) south of the city of Rockhampton.

The mountain, rising to 632 metres (2,073 ft), is 10.8 kilometres (6.7 mi) east of the town in the locality of Targinnie, but is a dominant feature on the horizon, especially from the town of Gladstone.

The locality of Mount Larcom has the following mountains:

- Bottle Tree Hill (23.8148°S 150.9702°E) 120 metres (390 ft)
- Curley (23.7873°S 151.0007°E) 264 metres (866 ft)
- Limestone Hill (23.7720°S 150.9736°E) 110 metres (360 ft)

The North Coast railway line enters the locality from the south (East End / Aldoga) and passes through the town which is served by Mount Larcom railway station (23.8078°S 150.9787°E). The line then forms the south-west boundary of the locality with Machine Creek before exiting to the exits to the west (Ambrose).

== History ==
Commander Matthew Flinders named Mount Larcom (the mountain) on 4 August 1802, after a Royal Navy colleague Captain Thomas Larcom. For most of the colonial period the spelling for the name of the region around the mountain was Mount Larcombe. It reverted to the spelling of Mount Larcom in the early 1900s.

In 1854, the region was made available for pastoral farming by the colonial British Government of New South Wales. The following year, William Young, a Scottish colonist who was previously a storekeeper at Gayndah, established the Mount Larcombe sheep station.

Frontier conflict occurred between British colonists and the Aboriginal residents at Mount Larcombe. William Young gave food and clothing to the local Aboriginal people in exchange for their land and their labour shearing his sheep, but also drove them away when they were not needed. He once kicked and pointed a gun at an Aboriginal man for not leaving a hut when told to. Native Police troopers were stationed on the property and in November 1855 they opened fire on a group of Aboriginal people at Mount Larcombe killing one. It was thought that some of the people shot at were involved in an attack a month earlier on the Native Police barracks located at nearby Rannes. In late December 1855, those that survived the shooting mounted a revenge attack on Mount Larcombe, taking sheep and supplies, and killing five station-hands including three men, one woman and an Aboriginal servant. William Young was away at Gladstone at the time reporting the drowning death of his superintendent. He was quickly informed of the killings and a punitive expedition was organised under the command of Lieutenant John Murray of the Native Police. Murray's group set out and later surrounded a camp of sleeping Aboriginal people at Hourigan's Creek. They subsequently killed a large number of people there and then tracked down other groups of Indigenous people in the following weeks as far as the northern banks of the Fitzroy River shooting them as they found them. Mount Larcombe sheep station was subjected to another series of killings in 1858. In October of that year, another three station-hands were killed by Aboriginal people. Second Lieutenant Frederick Wheeler of the Native Police was ordered to investigate the killings. Wheeler together with his troopers and William Young tracked down several camps of Aboriginal people but was only able to take seven female prisoners. Wheeler wrote in his report that they "were not able to shoot any...cannot say whether any of the murderers are amongst the mob, but they must all suffer, for the innocent must be held responsible for the guilt of others...going to Gladstone tomorrow but do not suppose to be able to shoot any." After resupplying at Gladstone, Wheeler set out again along the coastal estuaries where "some firing took place but unluckily no blacks were shot." Lieutenant John Murray with his own detachment of troopers then joined with Wheeler's group at Mount Larcombe and together set out on a large punitive expedition to the upper reaches of the Calliope River. Murray later reported that they came upon a large camp of Aboriginal people in that region and shot dead five of them, expressing disappointment that not more had been killed. Heavy rain interrupted further punitive measures and Wheeler and Murray returned to their barracks. Murray left instructions to Wheeler to conduct further operations to track down Aboriginal people when resupplied and the weather improved.

Mount Larcombe Provisional School opened on 13 November 1882, but closed for some time during the 1890s due to low student numbers. In 1909, it was upgraded to be Mount Larcombe State School and was renamed Mount Larcom State School in 1913. In 1964, a secondary department (Years 8-10) was added to the school.

In 1909, township allotments were advertised for sale as 'Mt Larcombe Estate', with the map showing the Gladstone railway station adjacent to the property.

Mount Larcom Post Office opened by December 1909 (a receiving office had been open from 1904, first known as Mount Larcombe).

Butlerville State School opened on 18 February 1918 but closed circa 1919. In 1922, it reopened and closed permanently in 1927. The school was located on a 5-acre (2.0 ha) site on the western side of The Narrows Road (23.7525°S 151.0324°E).

The first of Mount Larcom's annual agricultural shows was held on 8 October 1919. It was opened by George Carter, the Member of the Queensland Legislative Assembly for Port Curtis.

All Saints Anglican Church opened on Thursday 29 September 1921.

On Sunday 16 July 1922, the Catholic church was opened by Bishop of Rockhampton Joseph Shiel. It was named for Our Lady of Mount Carmel. The land cost £64 and the church building cost £441.

The ambulance station first opened in 1924; its replacement opened on 20 December 2001.

The Mount Larcom library building opened in 2004.

== Demographics ==
In the 2011 census, the locality of Mount Larcom had a population of 278 people.

In the 2016 census, the locality of Mount Larcom had a population of 361 people.

In the 2021 census, the locality of Mount Larcom had a population of 332 people.

== Heritage listings ==
Mount Larcom has a number of heritage-listed sites, including:

- 52780 Bruce Highway (now in East End): Mount Larcombe Station Original Homestead Site (23.87877°S 151.02224°E)
- Popenia Road: Mount Larcom Cemetery
- The Narrows Road: Mount Larcom Showground

== Transport ==
Mount Larcom railway station is on the North Coast railway line, with long-distance passenger trains operated by Queensland Rail stopping here and a direct line to Gladstone.

== Education ==
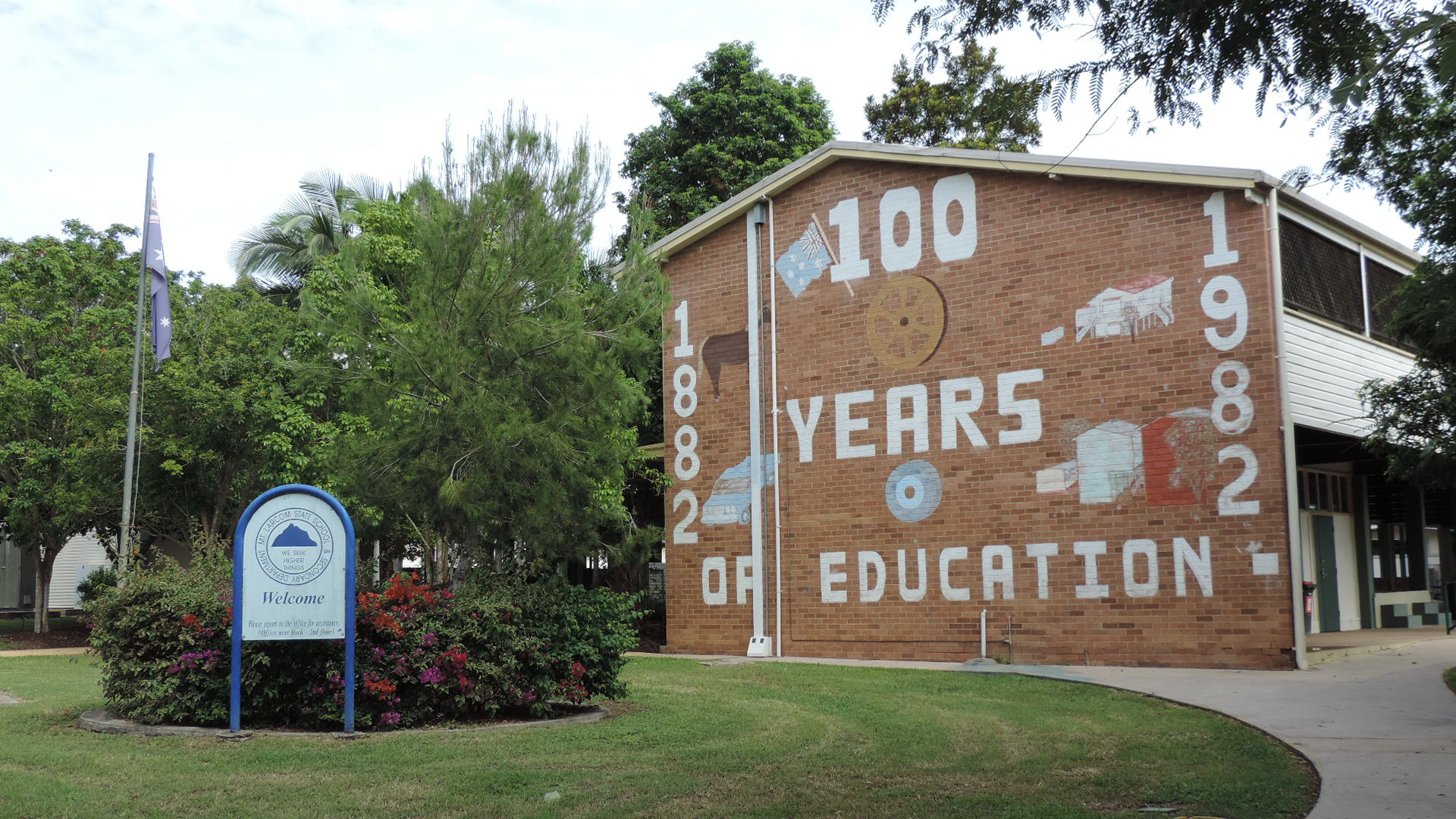
Mount Larcom State School, Raglan Street, Mount Larcom, 2014

Mount Larcom State School is a government primary and secondary (Prep-10) school for boys and girls at Raglan Street (23.8071°S 150.9745°E). In 2013, the school had 89 pupils and 10 teachers. In 2018, the school had an enrolment of 73 students with 12 teachers (10 full-time equivalent) and 10 non-teaching staff (7 full-time equivalent).

For secondary education to Year 12, the nearest government secondary school is Gladstone State High School in West Gladstone to the south-east.

== Amenities ==
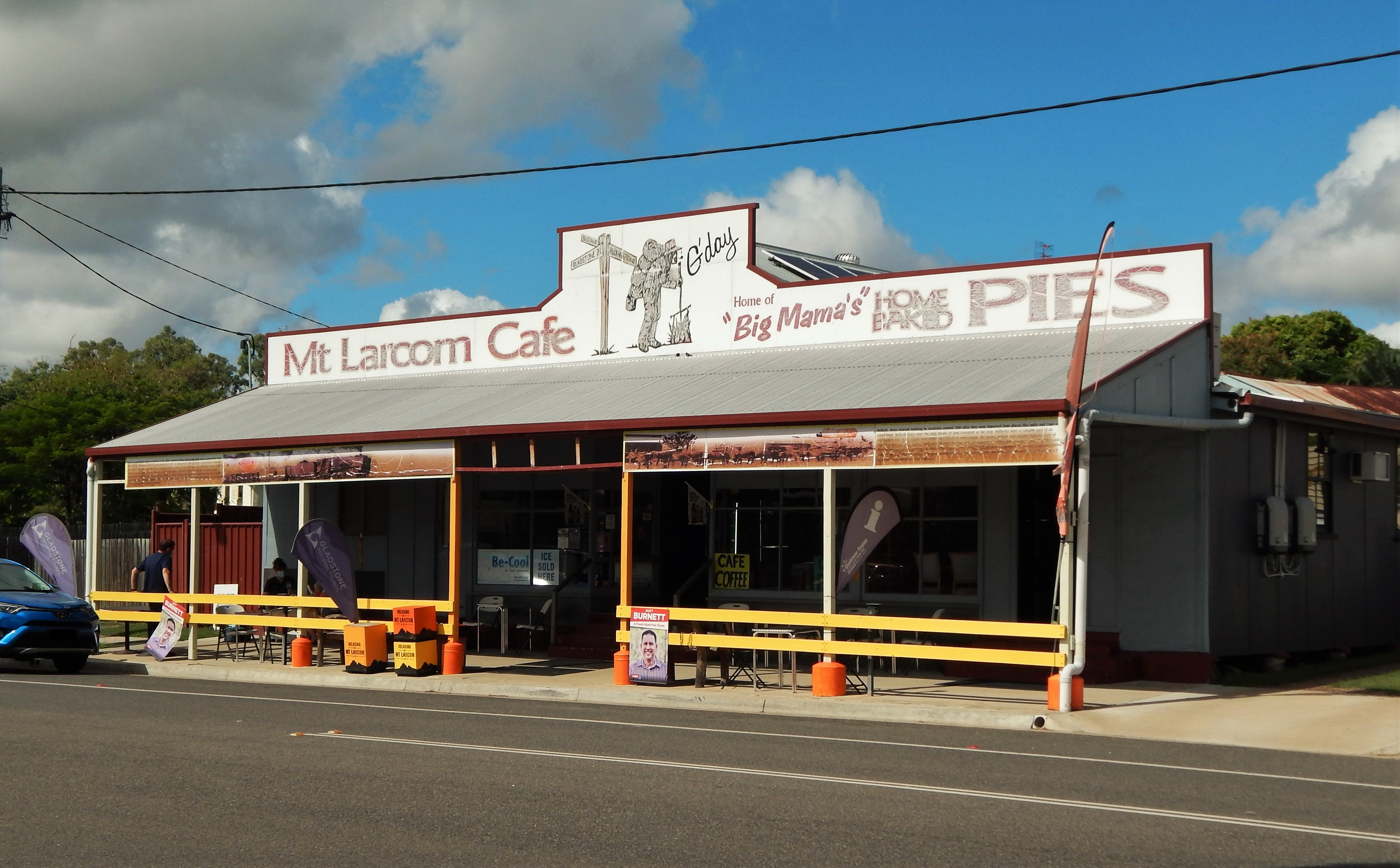
Pie shop in Mount Larcom, Queensland, Australia

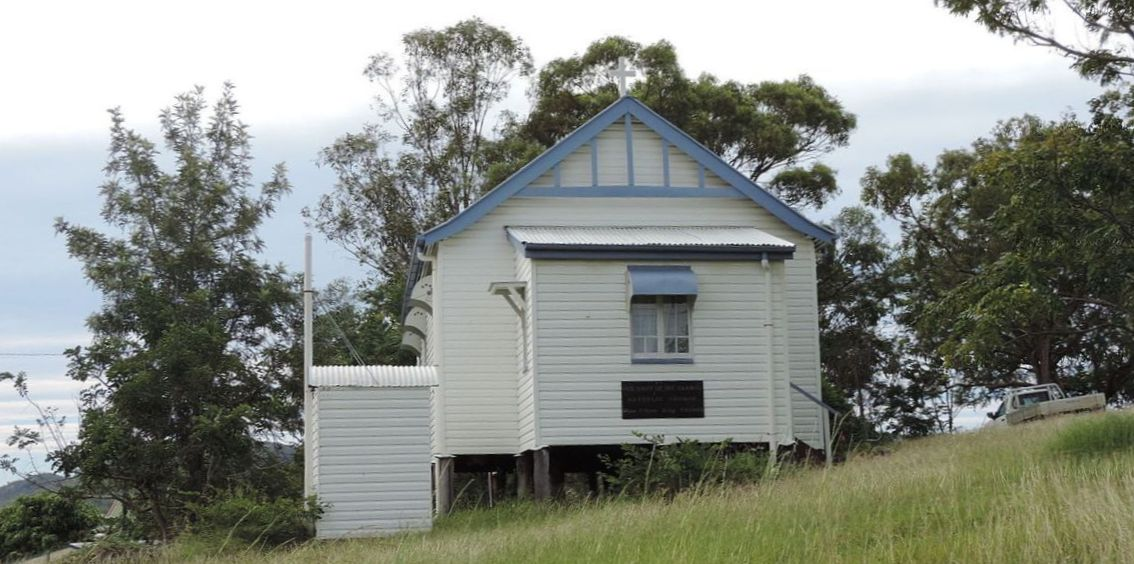
Our Lady of Mount Carmel Catholic Church, 24 Balfour Street, Mount Larcom, 2014

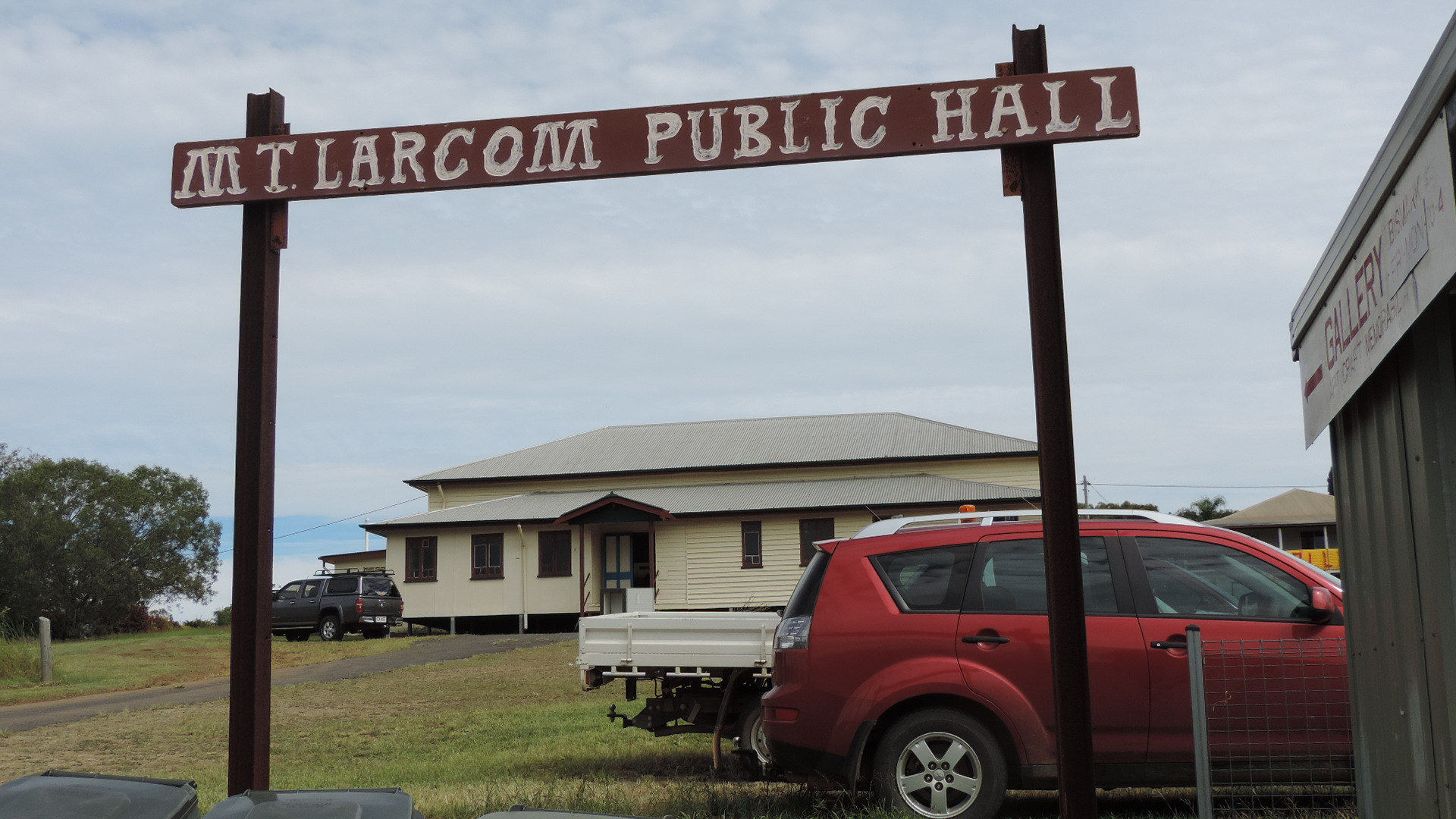
Public hall, 2014

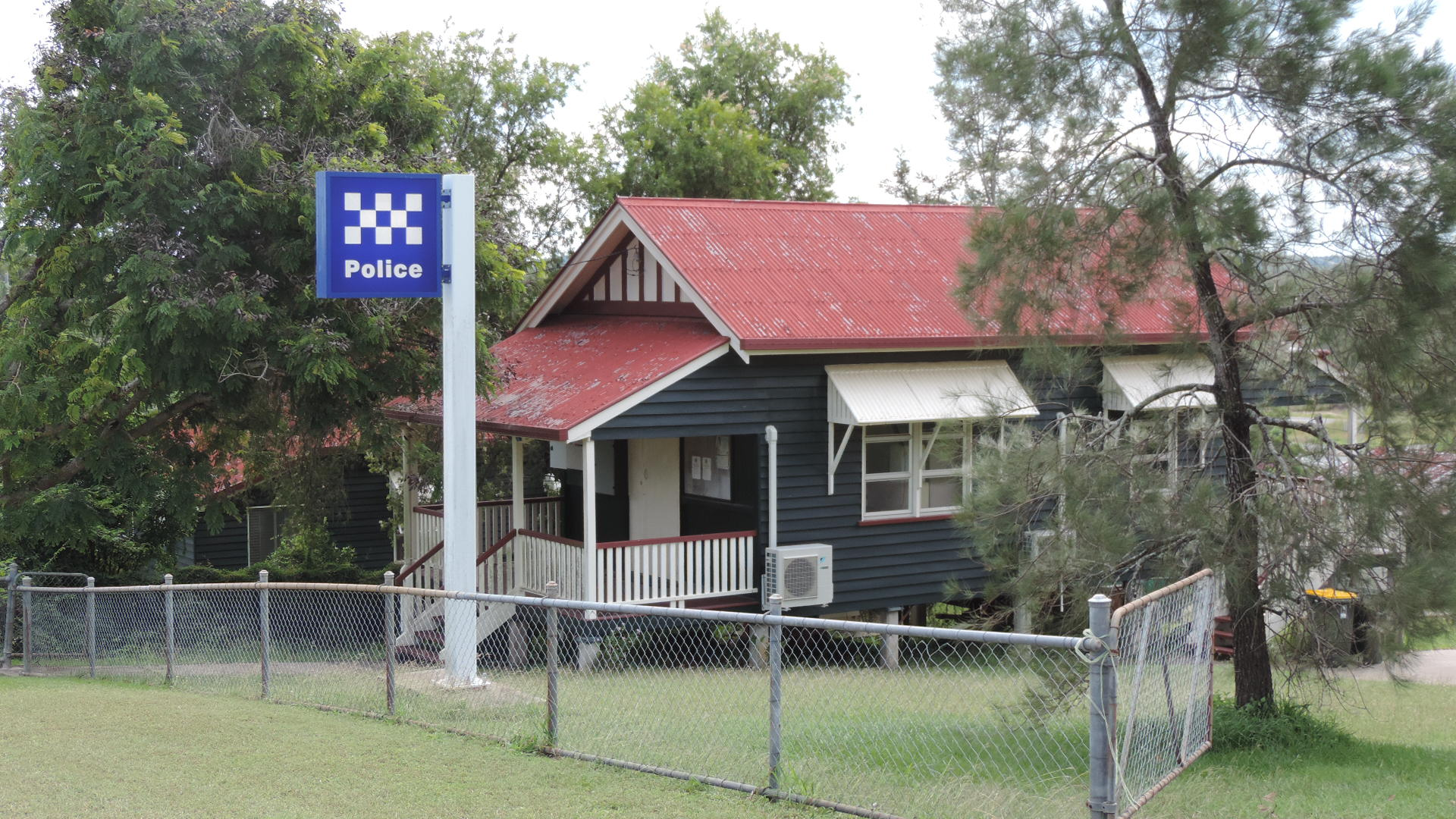
Police station, 2014

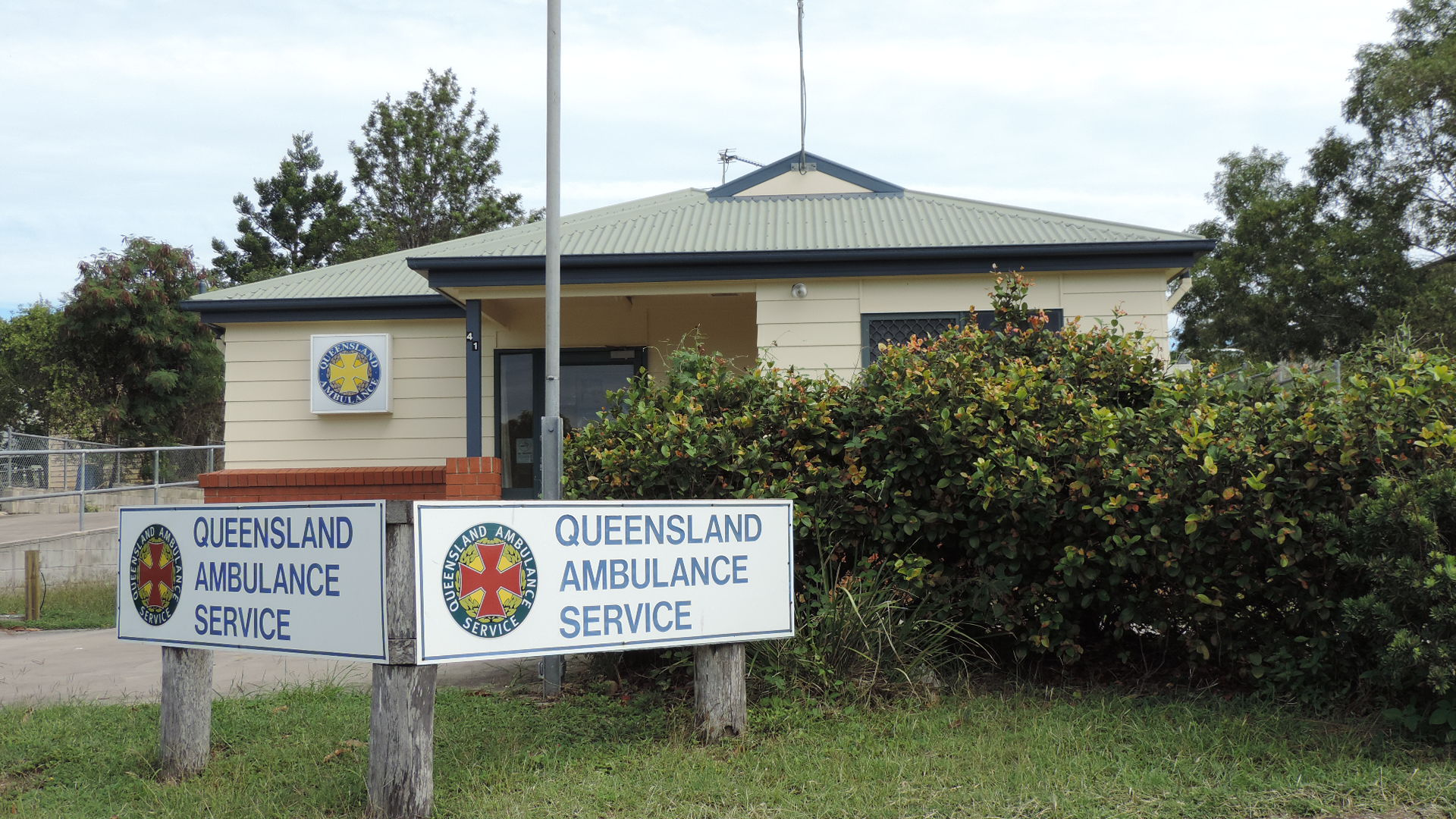
Ambulance station, Raglan Street, Mount Larcom, 2014

The Mount Larcom Library is on Raglan Street; it is operated by the Gladstone Regional Council.

There is a Catholic church, Our Lady of Mount Carmel, at 16 Balfour Street (23.81359°S 150.98051°E). Each month there is a mass and a lay-led liturgy.

All Saints Anglican Church is at 57 Raglan Street (23.80906°S 150.97746°E).

There is a public hall in Raglan Street.

Despite its small population, Mount Larcom has a police station (Gladstone Street), an ambulance station (Raglan Street), a volunteer Rural Fire Service and a volunteer State Emergency Service group. However, the nearest hospitals are in Gladstone and Rockhampton. Being located near the junction of two highways, a common emergency is vehicle crashes.

The Mount Larcom branch of the Queensland Country Women's Association meets at 4 King George Street (23.81142°S 150.97841°E).

== Events ==
The Mount Larcom and District Show Society organise an annual agricultural show in June each year. In 2014, in addition to the livestock competitions, there are other activities including a ute muster, woodchopping and fireworks.

== See also ==
- List of schools in Central Queensland
