= Raglan Homestead =

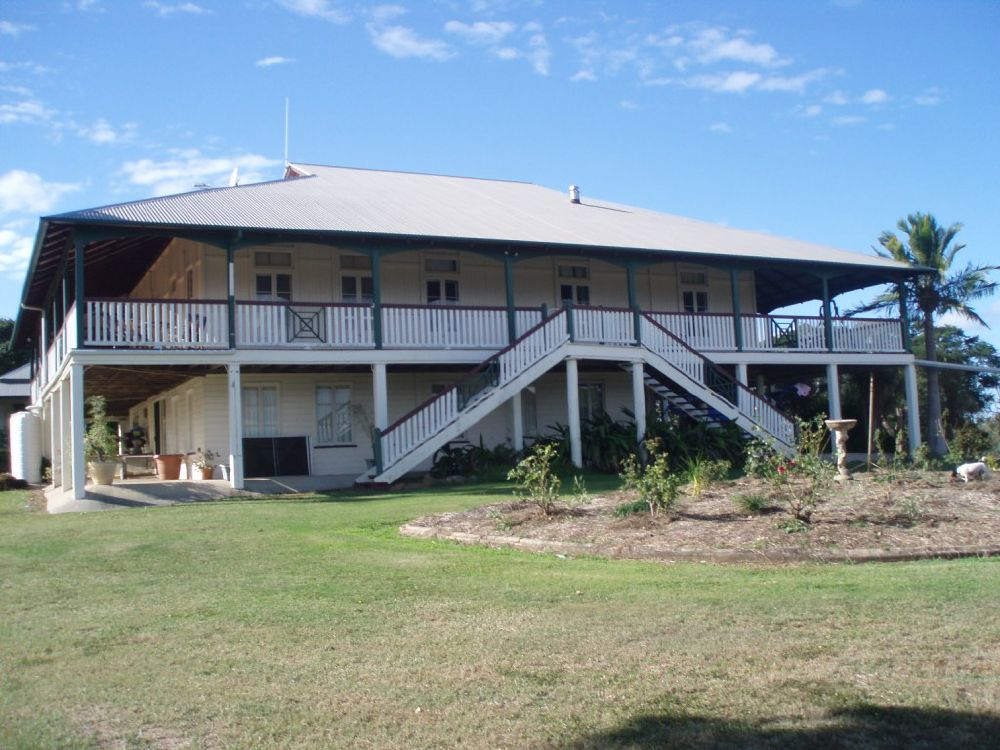
- Raglan Homestead, 2009

- Location within Queensland Location within Australia
- 23.7328°S 150.8828°E
- Location: Raglan Station Road, Raglan, Queensland, Australia

History
- Design period: 1840s - 1860s (mid-19th century)
- Built: c. 1857 - 1913

Queensland Heritage Register
- Official name: Raglan Homestead, Raglan Station Road
- Type: state heritage (archaeological, landscape, built)
- Designated: 21 October 1992
- Reference no.: 600389
- Significant period: 1850s-1870s (historical); 1850s-1910s (fabric)
- Significant components: out building/s, residential accommodation - main house, stables, shed/s, views from, hut/shack

Raglan Homestead is a heritage-listed homestead at Raglan Station Road, Raglan, Queensland, Australia. It was built from c. 1857 to 1913. It is also known as Raglan Station. It was added to the Queensland Heritage Register on 21 October 1992.

== History ==
Raglan Station, located just north of Larcom (earlier Larcombe) Vale Creek in the Port Curtis hinterland, was established in 1857 by James Landsborough. The present main residence at Raglan Homestead was erected in 1913, but there are other earlier structures within the complex, including a slab hut that may date to the establishment of the station, and a c. 1886 timber cottage.

The area was explored by Charles and William Archer in 1853 and in 1856 by William Landsborough (who in 1861–1862 was to lead one of the official relief expeditions in search of the missing explorers Burke and Wills). It was incorporated within the Port Curtis Pastoral District, proclaimed in January 1854, which included the County of Raglan, named in honour of Lord Raglan, a British hero of the Crimean War (1853–1856). Frontier violence ensued as squatters moved into the district and in 1855 five persons on Mount Larcom Station were killed by Aborigines.

In early 1856, by way of reprisal for the killing of the five people at Mt Larcombe, John Murray, commander of the local Native Mounted Police, together with other heavily armed settlers, formed a death squad which surrounded a group of around 200 Aboriginal people near Hourigan Creek at Raglan and slaughtered them. A minority who escaped were pursued to Keppel Bay and again attacked, being either shot down in cold blood or driven into the sea. It was reported that the posts around the flower garden at Raglan Homestead were for many years adorned with the skulls of the Aboriginal massacre victims and that later these skulls were hung on the walls of the tool shed.

The brothers James and John Landsborough, originally from Stevenston in Scotland, had taken up sheep-raising in the New England district of New South Wales in the 1840s, but in the 1850s decided to search for better pastures to the north. Between 1854 and 1858 James and John in partnership, and their younger brother William in partnership with others, took up a number of Wide Bay-Burnett pastoral leases. From the late 1850s they began transferring their interests to the Port Curtis district, commencing with James Landsborough overlanding sheep onto Raglan run in 1857. The run was situated on Raglan Creek midway between Gladstone and Rockhampton, in the County of Deas Thompson. James had just reached the station and was constructing the first slab hut on the Raglan Homestead site, above the Larcom Vale Creek crossing, when John Macartney visited him on 30 December 1857. The first Raglan wool clip was ready by February 1859, when the Archer's boat the Jenny Lind sailed up Raglan Creek to move the cargo to Gladstone.

A mail service between Port Curtis (Gladstone) and Rockhampton via Raglan Station commenced in 1859. Coaches subsequently used this route, and a change station operated at Raglan Head Station until Parson's Inn was opened near Black's Crossing on Raglan Creek c. 1885.

John and James Landsborough gained the official lease of the 30-square-mile (78 km^{2}) Raglan run in January 1860. About this time James, who had married Georgiana Sothers in Maitland in 1849 and had a young family, erected a new dwelling on Raglan: an exposed-stud timber building of two rooms with a wide surrounding verandah and a detached kitchen at the south-west corner.

In 1862 James acquired sole interest in Raglan and Larcom Vale runs and by 1863 the Raglan Station he had developed comprised at least seven runs - Raglan, Larcom Vale, San Jose, Stevenston, Trafalgar, Meringo and Lodi - approximately 200 square miles (520 km^{2}) in total, bounded to the north by the Bajool Scrub and Gracemere station, to the south by the Bracewell Scrub and Mount Larcom station, to the west by the Dee Range, and to the east by coastal mudflats. He continued to run sheep at Raglan, cared for mainly by recent Chinese immigrants.

However, in 1865 he relinquished his interest in Raglan to take up Sonoma station near Bowen Downs (held by William Landsborough and others) in the Kennedy pastoral district. The leases to Larcom Vale, San Jose, No.2 Stevenston, and Trafalgar were transferred in mid-1865 to AH Richardson, General Manager of the Australian Joint Stock Bank. By February 1867 John Ward was occupying Raglan station, raising cattle. By March 1868, White and Ronald held the leases to Raglan (30 square miles) and Marengo (25 square miles) in the Port Curtis Pastoral District, and AH Richardson still held Larcom Vale, Trafalgar, and San Jose.

The telegraph line between Rockhampton and Port Curtis Island in Keppel Bay was constructed via Raglan Station in 1867 and in the same year the Raglan and Langmorn goldfields were proclaimed, resulting in a small, brief "rush" on the station. A few shops and hotels were constructed to service these goldfields, but little evidence of these survives.

In 1868 the Raglan leases passed to the Bank of New South Wales, which in 1869 consolidated the property under the provisions of the Crown Lands Alienation Act of 1868 and sold the south-western portion to brothers Thomas and George Creed, who named their property Langmorn, which they operated as a cattle station. From accounts in Thomas Creed's diaries, there appears to have been a continuing relationship between the two properties, with landmarks on Raglan also being used by Langmorn occupants as meeting and resting points. At the time of the 1 September 1871 Queensland census, there were four houses on Raglan Station accommodating 20 persons (16 males and 4 females), and at Langmorn there were 2 houses sheltering 10 persons (7 males and 3 females). Part of the resumed portion of Raglan was thrown open to selection as homestead areas in 1876.

Between c. 1869 and c. 1874 Raglan was occupied as a cattle run by David Wilson, initially in partnership with Richard Elliot Palmer, but obtaining sole interest early in 1873. His DW2 remains a station brand. He applied for the Raglan Head Station block, located on the north side of Larcom Vale Creek, as a pre-emptive selection of 836 acres (338 ha), but did not obtain title and in June 1874 the freehold was purchased by Archibald Menzies of Melbourne, who also acquired the Raglan leasehold of about 80 square miles (210 km^{2}). At this time improvements at Raglan Homestead were valued at over £1,000 and comprised: a dwelling house (c. 1860) and garden, store, kitchen, bachelors' quarters, men's hut (possibly the original 1857 hut), fowl house, sheep classing yard, wool shed, other stockyards and extensive fencing. Between late 1878 and mid-1885 Raglan Station was managed by John A Menzies, who erected a small weatherboard school at Raglan Homestead, where his children were tutored.

In mid-1885 the Raglan lease and the head station freehold were transferred to Thomas McKellar of Melbourne whose agent, JA McKellar, managed the property and applied in September 1885 to bring Raglan under the provisions of the Crown Lands Act 1884. For this purpose the consolidated Raglan Station was assessed as comprising 71 square miles (180 km^{2}) available for subdivision, with the land capable of running 37 head of cattle to the square mile. In June 1887, 45 square miles (120 km^{2}) of the run (much of this marine plains and scrub lands) was resumed for closer settlement, although this was not opened for selection until 1899. The remainder was leased to Thomas McKellar. About 1886 McKellar added a two-roomed cottage wing to the c. 1860 house.

By December 1892 Thomas McKellar had returned permanently to Scotland and in March 1893 transferred his interest in Raglan, including the head station freehold, to his brother Ernest Edward McKellar, who initially resided on the property. By April 1898 John N Menzies, whose father had managed Raglan station from 1878 to 1885, had returned to Raglan as manager, a position he held for eleven years.

Following the devastating drought of 1902, EE McKellar was left with a run reduced to five-sixths of its original area and in 1909 made the decision to dispose of Raglan Station, selling to John Murray Macdonald on 18 February 1910.

JM Macdonald (only he chose this spelling of the family name McDonald) had sold his Ben Ean vineyard, cellar and distillery in New South Wales to Lindeman's Wines Ltd with a four-year management contract to early 1912, allowing him "cash in hand" to travel north in search of a cattle property. On purchase of Raglan he still had two years of his contract to fulfil with Lindemans, so an agreement was made with Frederick William Tyrrell, who acted as managing partner until John and his wife Harriet (Hettie), arrived at Raglan in May 1912. Title to the Raglan Homestead block was transferred to JM Macdonald in June 1912.

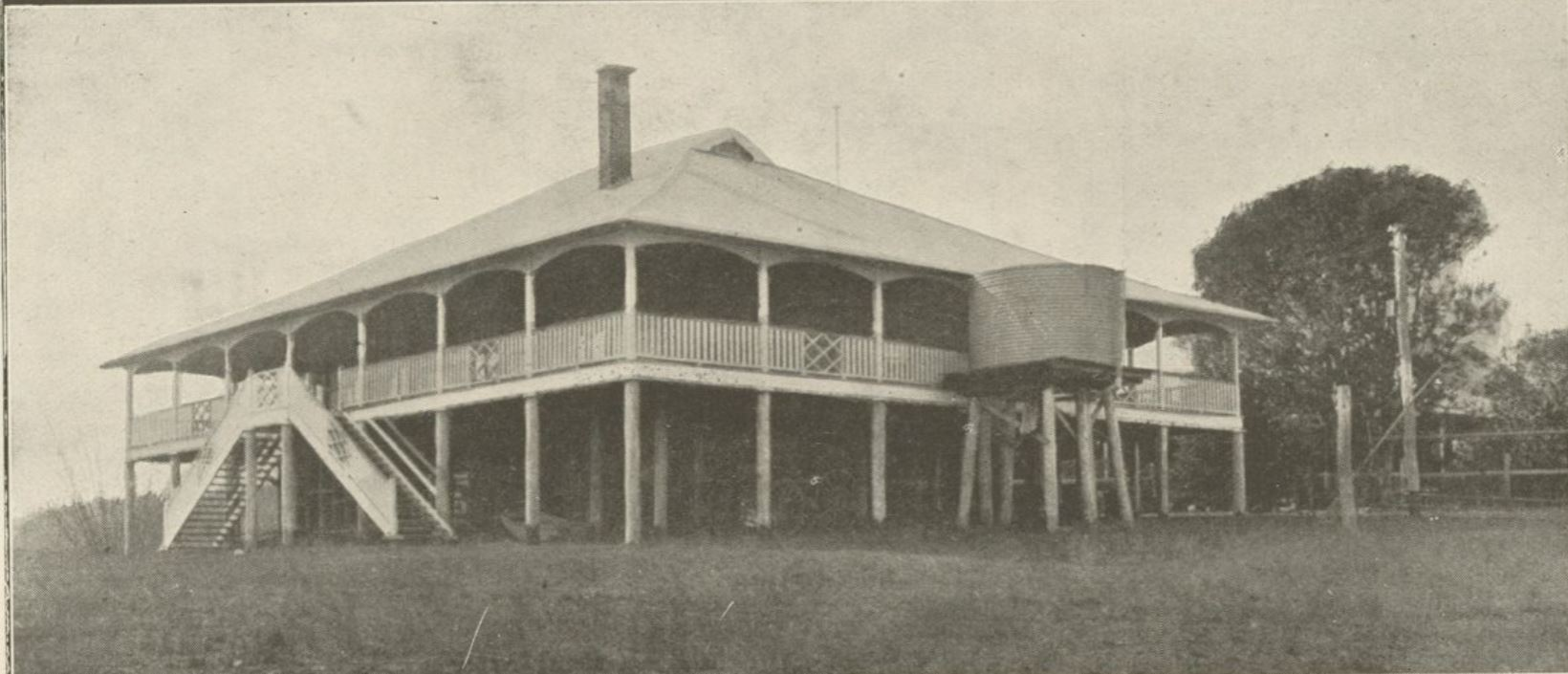
The Homestead at Raglan, 1917

In 1913, a new residence was constructed at Raglan Homestead for the Macdonalds, just south of the c. 1886 cottage wing and c. 1860 house, overlooking Larcom Vale Creek. The substantial timber residence was designed by Fredrick Eckersley Boddington, an architect based in Rockhampton from 1911 to 1915, and was constructed by contractors Taylor and McKenzie. A sawmill was set up on the creek below the house where all the hardwood timber was milled. The house was built on high timber stumps and comprised 42 squares, over half of which were taken up by a 10-foot (3.0 m) deep encircling verandah. The front (southern) elevation had a centrally-positioned divided stair leading to the verandah. Both the verandah and the stair had a simple slatted timber balustrade with some cross-braced timber panels for a decorative effect. The hipped roof, which extended in bungalow fashion over the verandahs, had gablets to the eastern and western ends and was clad with corrugated galvanised iron.

The internal layout of the 1913 house incorporated two large living spaces in the centre: a front (southern-facing) dining room 24 by 16 feet (7.3 m × 4.9 m) and the only room in the house to contain a fireplace; and behind this, on the northern side of the building, a tropical lounge 24 by 24 feet (7.3 m × 7.3 m), separated from the rear verandah by lattice timber panels and walk-through openings. On the western side of this room, steps led to the sub-floor. The eastern side of the building contained a main bedroom at the front, small office, and another bedroom at the rear; the western side was the service wing, with maid's bedroom at the front (separated from the dining room by a hall leading to the front verandah), pantry and kitchen. Ceilings throughout were 12 feet (3.7 m) in height, to encourage air circulation. With the exception of the office and the pantry, all the other rooms opened via French doors to the verandahs. Interior partitions were of vertically jointed tongue-in-groove timber boards.

During John and Harriet Macdonald's ownership of Raglan, John's nephew Hector McDonald worked on Raglan between 1920 and 1924. Three other overseers were employed: Eric White, who came from Ben Ean in New South Wales; Charlie Mayne who was at Raglan from the 1920s to 1931; and Archie Stewart who stayed for over 32 years from October 1931. The c. 1860 house was demolished about 1930.

After Hettie's death in 1938 John Macdonald, who had no children, relied increasingly on Archie Stewart and his wife Jane. On his death on 26 December 1957 at the age of 94, John Macdonald left a portion of Raglan Station to the Stewarts but the bulk of his estate, including Raglan Homestead, passed as the John and Hettie Macdonald Trust to the Presbyterian Church of New South Wales, to be used to build homes for the aged. The trust was divided when the Uniting Church was formed in Australia in the 1970s, and is now known as the Macdonald Homes for the Presbyterian Church and McDonald Homes for the Uniting Church, with over 70 houses built in Sydney.

In February 1961 the Presbyterian Church sold Raglan Station to John's nephew and executor, Hector McDonald and his wife Betty and eldest son Ian, who had completed a degree at the Gatton Agricultural College in 1958. The family took up residence there in April 1962. In 1969 Hector and Betty retired to a property near Warwick, leaving Ian and his family on Raglan. In the 1970s Ian McDonald made a number of changes at the homestead, including demolition of the c. 1878 school house and relocation of part of the old kitchen to the north-east corner of the cattle yards in 1970, and relocation of the slab hut (possibly dating to 1857) from in front of the 1913 house to beside the horse yard, to function as a saddle shed.

In 1983 Raglan Station passed out of the McDonald family and was acquired by the Olive family in 1986. The roof and verandah of the main residence were reconstructed following a severe storm on 7 November 2000.

== Description ==
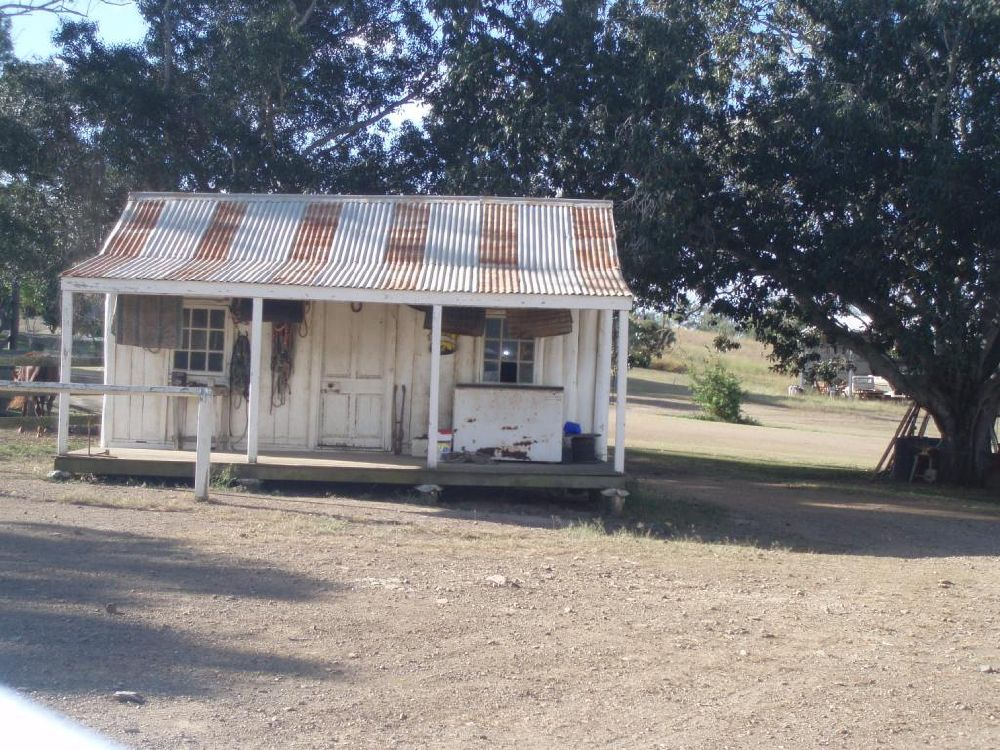
Slab hut, 2009

Raglan Homestead is located to the north-east of Raglan Creek and just north of Larcom Vale Creek, approximately halfway between Rockhampton and Gladstone on the old coach road, which is now by-passed by the Bruce Highway. The complex is located six kilometres from the highway in an easterly direction. Early structures within the complex include a slab hut (possibly dating to 1857), a c. 1886 timber cottage, a 1913 residence, sheds and stables.

The main residence (1913) is a high set, timber-framed house (exposed stud) lined with vertically jointed tongue-in-groove timber boards. French doors with breezeways and timber-framed sash windows are located along each elevation and open to the verandah which surrounds the building on all sides and offers sweeping views of the surrounding country. Internally, the homestead retains much of its original vertically jointed timber partition walls and timber ceilings.

A low-set, timber-framed cottage (c. 1886) clad with weatherboards, with a stepped verandah and a hipped roof clad with corrugated iron, is located just north of the main house. There are back-to-back fireplaces with timber surrounds in the wall between the two rooms, but the chimney is no longer extant.

The slab hut (possibly dating to 1857) is a single-storeyed, timber- framed structure with a gable roof clad with corrugated iron, set on the ground a short distance from the main house. The building has a timber floor and walls constructed of vertical slabs, the tops of which are set in morticed top bearers. The upper sections of the side elevations are clad with corrugated iron. A stepped verandah with a skillion roof is located to one side of the hut. Two nine-pane windows are located in the front elevation. The entrance to the hut, a panelled timber door, is located in this elevation.

A large, two-storey volume shed constructed with bush timbers and clad with corrugated iron is located near the slab hut.

Also located near the slab hut is a stables, which is timber-framed and clad with corrugated iron, with large double timber doors located along one elevation. Attached to the stables is a timber-framed shed and set of timber yards.

Other later sheds and holding yards have been constructed on the homestead site. These are not considered to be of cultural heritage significance.

A large tamarind tree remains, originally central to the front garden of the c. 1860 house.

== Heritage listing ==
Raglan Homestead was listed on the Queensland Heritage Register on 21 October 1992 having satisfied the following criteria.

The place is important in demonstrating the evolution or pattern of Queensland's history.

Raglan Homestead and Slab Hut illustrates the pattern of early European exploration and settlement of Queensland where the development of pastoral properties preceded agriculture and the establishment of towns. As an early homestead in central Queensland which has remained in continuous use, it has important associations with the development of the pastoral industry in Queensland.

The place has potential to yield information that will contribute to an understanding of Queensland's history.

Due to its age and intact nature, Raglan Homestead and Slab Hut has the potential to yield information on the way in which such properties were run and evidence for the building techniques used over several generations, thus contributing to an understanding of Queensland's history.

The place is important in demonstrating the principal characteristics of a particular class of cultural places.

Raglan Homestead and Slab Hut is significant in that it demonstrates the principal characteristics of a 19th-century homestead well, including the residential buildings, associated outbuildings, fences and mature trees.

The place is important because of its aesthetic significance.

The homestead complex contains structures which are well designed and made examples of traditional buildings which are pleasing in form, materials and detail and mature trees which contribute visually to the setting and provide a landmark in the area.

The place has a special association with the life or work of a particular person, group or organisation of importance in Queensland's history.

Raglan Homestead and Slab Hut has a special association with the life and work of the MacDonald family, who, as early pastoralists contributed to the development of the area.
