= J. T. S. Bird =

John Theophilus Symons (JTS) Bird (1842 - 1932) was an Australian journalist, historian, author and gold prospector.

== Early life ==
Bird was born in Buckland Brewer, Devon in England on 10 May 1842.

He was trained as a newspaper printer and compositor in Devon, and worked on local newspapers in Torquay including The Chronicle and The Recorder.

Bird and his two younger brothers departed England for Australia on 4 March 1863 aboard the migrant ship Beejapore, arriving in Keppel Bay on 25 June 1863.

The day after Bird arrived, he commenced work at The Morning Bulletin in Rockhampton as a compositor. He remained at the newspaper until late 1866 when he decided to pursue gold mining on the various goldfields around the local area.

== Gold Mining ==
During the 1867-1870 period of gold mining in Queensland, Bird spent time on goldfields around Rockhampton, Bouldercombe, Raglan, Canoona, Peak Downs and as far south as Gympie.

Bird's best success was found at Ridgelands, to the west of Rockhampton, in 1867 when he and his prospecting partner Arthur Hoskings discovered gold within the granite and slate deposits in the area. Their find prompted scores of other hopeful prospectors to descend on the area which helped establish a small township at Ridgelands.

Bird and Hosking applied for a £500 reward from the government for discovering a new goldfield but were rewarded with the smaller amount of £200, becoming the first people in Queensland to be rewarded for finding gold.

It was during a gold mining expedition on the Gympie goldfields, he married his wife Kezia Seymour at Maryborough, Queensland on 4 April 1868.

After his marriage, Bird decided to travel to the Gilbert River in Far North Queensland but only made it as far as Mackay where he recommenced newspaper work at The Daily Mercury, effectively ending his gold mining aspirations.

== Newspaper career ==
Bird had returned to Rockhampton by 1870, and rejoined the staff at The Morning Bulletin. He recommenced worked in the composing room at the newspaper where he became foreman and overseer by 1875.

Following this, Bird moved into more editorial roles and due to his gold mining experience was appointed editor of the newspaper's mining columns. As mining editor, Bird became one of the first to write about the gold which was found at Mount Morgan in 1882, resulting in the construction of Mount Morgan Mine.

Bird also became The Morning Bulletin's sports editor, writing the newspaper's local sports columns using the pen name Veno.

During his newspaper career, Bird was appointed chairperson of the Printing Trade Board on numerous occasions.

In 1909, he concluded working as overseer of the newspaper's mechanical staff after being in the position for 38 years. The staff at the newspaper presented Bird with a purse of sovereigns as a token of hope that Bird's purse would be full for the remainder of his life. Bird said he was surprised at the gesture as although he was finishing in the composing room, he was still intending to work at the newspaper in a less physically demanding role.

Following the death of his wife in February 1918, Bird decided to leave Rockhampton to reside in Brisbane, ending a 55-year association with The Morning Bulletin. Upon his departure from The Morning Bulletin, the employees of the newspaper gathered in the composing room to make speeches, and farewell gift presentations to Bird.

Despite living in Brisbane, Bird still submitted work to The Morning Bulletin as a freelance contributor until about twelve months before his death in 1932.

== Historical Research ==
=== The Early History of Rockhampton ===
Throughout his time with The Morning Bulletin, Bird researched and wrote about the early history of Central Queensland, from European settlement up until about 1870. His efforts culminated when all his newspaper research was collated into a book he authored called The Early History of Rockhampton.

The Early History of Rockhampton was first published by The Morning Bulletin in 1904. The book has been republished several times since. Most recently, the book was republished by Coorooman Press in 2016. Original copies of the 1904 publication are considered to by valuable, worth approximately $1500 each. Several copies are held in the "Rare Books" section in the John Oxley Library at the State Library of Queensland in Brisbane.

=== Critical reception ===
In her own book, Rockhampton: A History of City & District, Queensland historian Dr Lorna McDonald OAM described Bird as Rockhampton's first historian despite never receiving formal training as either a historian or journalist.

McDonald said that despite occasional inaccuracies, The Early History of Rockhampton was a very rare pre-World War I publication and the best of its kind in Queensland. Dr McDonald also states that Bird was a versatile writer, with his writing reflecting the resilience of human memory and his inability to gain access to official records.

However, Dr McDonald accused Bird of lacking complete objectivity, citing the omission of at least one prominent Rockhampton pioneer due to a conflict between Bird and the man's son.

Bird has also been posthumously criticised for the negative way he wrote about and portrayed local indigenous tribes and for omitting events where Aboriginal people were murdered.

Bird had planned a revised second edition of his book, but it never eventuated due to the outbreak of World War I in 1915.

== Death ==
After suffering from decling health including a stroke, Bird died in Brisbane on 7 May 1932.

His wife and five of their seven children had predeceased him. His funeral was held at the Toowong Cemetery.

== Legacy ==
Bird Court, a street in the Rockhampton suburb of Frenchville is named after J.T.S. Bird.
