= List of shipwrecks in 1863 =

The list of shipwrecks in 1863 includes ships sunk, foundered, grounded, or otherwise lost during 1863.

table of contents
1863
Jan	Feb	Mar	Apr
May	Jun	Jul	Aug
Sep	Oct	Nov	Dec
Unknown date

== Unknown date ==
List of shipwrecks: Unknown date in 1863
Ship	State	Description
Acacia	United Kingdom	The barque was wrecked at Hokiang, China.
Adeline	Flag unknown	The ship was wrecked in the Falkland Islands. She was on a voyage from Havana, Cuba to Valparaíso, Chile.
Adrien	Flag unknown	The lugger sank at Gurnard's Head, Cornwall, England, with the loss of four of the five crew.
African	United Kingdom	The ship was wrecked in Champion Bay.
Alcyone	United States	The 88-ton schooner capsized during a gale at the Noyo River in Noyo Harbor at Fort Bragg, California, Confederate States of America either between 12 and 16 January or on 17 February.
Alhambra	United States	The 187-ton sternwheel paddle steamer burned on the Mississippi River at Commerce, Missouri.
Alice and Mary	Flag unknown	The full-rigged ship was wrecked on the coast of Texas, Confederate States of America.
Antagonist	(United Kingdom of Great Britain and Ireland) New South Wales	The barque was wrecked in the Torres Straits.
Argo	Confederate States of America	American Civil War: The sternwheel paddle steamer was burned by the sidewheel paddle steamer USS Linden (United States Navy) in Mississippi about 75 nautical miles (139 km) up the Sunflower River in mid-1863.
Argosy	Confederate States of America	American Civil War: The steamer was burned on the Sunflower River in mid-1863 to prevent her capture by Union forces.
Artizan	United Kingdom	The paddle steamer was abandoned at Killaloe, County Clare.
Beejapore	United Kingdom	The clipper was lost in the Pacific Ocean during a voyage from Keppel Bay, Queensland, to Callao, Peru.
Belle Creole	United States	The sidewheel paddle steamer sank in the Ohio River near West Columbia, West Virginia during the winter of 1863-1864.
Belle Peoria	United States	The sidewheel paddle steamer was wrecked in the Missouri River at Fort Buford in the Dakota Territory sometime between 1862 and 1864. She was repaired and returned to service.
Blossom	Flag unknown	The full-rigged ship was wrecked in the Gulf of Mexico off the coast of Texas.
California	Confederate States of America	American Civil War: The 77-ton schooner was scuttled as a blockship at the Dog River Bar in Mobile Bay, Alabama, in 1862 or 1863.
Caroline	Flag unknown	The 80-ton schooner was wrecked in Mendocino County, California.
Carrier Dove	United States	The clipper ran aground near Valentia Island, County Kerry, United Kingdom. She was refloated, repaired and returned to service.
Catalonian	United Kingdom	The cargo ship was wrecked.
Catherine	Flag unknown	American Civil War, Union blockade: During an attempt to run the Union blockade, the schooner was stranded at Sabine Pass on the border between Louisiana and Texas sometime during the American Civil War.
Charm	Confederate States of America	American Civil War: The sidewheel paddle steamer sank in the Mississippi River sometime in 1863 while lashed to the sidewheel paddle steamer Paul Jones (Confederate States of America). Her wreck was burned to the waterline.
Clara	Hamburg	The brig was driven ashore in the Yangtze-kiang.
Cleveland	United Kingdom	The ship ran aground off "Tanong Bolus". She was on a voyage from China to London. She was refloated with assistance from HMS Rifleman (Royal Navy).
Cochief	United States	The 69-ton schooner was wrecked on Fish Rock at Point Arena, California, on either 30 January 1863 or 30 January 1865.
Colombo	United States	The vessel was wrecked off Jamaica in early 1863.
Colonel Clay	Confederate States of America	American Civil War: The 257-ton sidewheel paddle steamer was scuttled as a blockship at the Dog River Bar in Mobile Bay, in 1862 or 1863.
Courier	United States	The 165-ton sternwheel paddle steamer was lost.
Dr. Kane	United States	The 191-ton sternwheel paddle steamer struck a snag and sank in deep water in the Ohio River 300 yards (274 meters) below the public wharf at Cairo, Illinois, sometime during the American Civil War.
Duke of Malakoff	United Kingdom	The ship was abandoned in the Pacific Ocean off Valdivia, Chile. She was on a voyage from the Chincha Islands, Chile to Belle Isle.
Eagle	Flag unknown	The schooner may have been stranded on the coast of California during 1863. If so, she was refloated and returned to service.
Far West	Flag unknown	The two-masted schooner was stranded at Russian Gulch, California on either 15 January or 17 February.
Francis Helen, or Francis Ellen	Flag unknown	Carrying a cargo of railroad ties and pilings, the schooner drifted ashore in Bell Creek, California either during April or on 6 October.
Frigate Bird	Flag unknown	The full-rigged ship was lost at Applegate Cove on the coast of Washington Territory.
Gazelle	United States	The ship was wrecked in the Palawan Passage. She was on a voyage from Batavia, Netherlands East Indies to San Francisco, California.
General McNeil	Flag unknown	The sternwheel paddle steamer struck a snag and sank in the Missouri River at Howards Bend near St. Louis, Missouri, sometime during the 1860s.
Grand Duke	Confederate States Army	American Civil War: The sidewheel paddle steamer burned on the Red River of the South at Shreveport, Louisiana, late in 1863.
Jeanie Deans	United Kingdom	The ship was wrecked in the Torres Strait between the Fitzroy Islands and Green Island, Tasmania.
Jesus Ramos	Chile	The barque was presumed to have foundered.
Juliana	France	American Civil War, Union blockade: The sloop was captured by United States Navy forces at Galveston, Texas, and sunk by the gunboat USS Owasco (United States Navy).
Lady Abercrombie	United Kingdom	The ship was lost near the mouth of the Congo River, Africa. Her crew were rescued.
Lucy	United Kingdom	The barque was lost in Duncan's Channel. Her crew were rescued by Hydaspes (United Kingdom). Lucy was on a voyage from Calcutta, India to Colombo, Ceylon.
Maggie Johnston	Flag unknown	The schooner was stranded on the coast of San Mateo County, California.
Marens	Flag unknown	The brig sank in the James River sometime during the American Civil War.
Mary Martin	Flag unknown	The schooner was stranded on the coast of San Mateo County, California.
Matilda	Confederate States of America	The schooner was wrecked in Matagorda Bay.
Morning Star II	flag unknown	American Civil War, Union blockade: The 198-ton sidewheel paddle steamer was burned by Confederates off the coast of Texas.
Nanjemoy	Confederate States of America	American Civil War: The full-rigged ship was sunk with no cargo aboard in shallow water in the Coan River while operating as a blockade runner sometime between 1861 and 1863. The armed tug USS Yankee (United States Navy) refloated her as a prize on 15 July 1863.
Neptune	Confederate States of America	The schooner sank in the Hillsborough River near Tampa, Florida.
Nevada	United States	The sidewheel paddle steamer struck a snag in Steamboat Slough upstream from Rio Vista, California, while racing the steamer New World (United States). She then ran into a bank in Cache Slough in quicksand and sank without loss of life.
North	United States	The 232-register ton sidewheel paddle steamer was lost in late 1863.
Osiris	Confederate States of America	American Civil War: The 145- or 183-ton sidewheel paddle steamer, operated as a ferry by the Confederate Quartermaster Department o between Charleston, Castle Pickney, and Sullivan's Island, was destroyed by a fire allegedly set by Union sympathizers sometime during the American Civil War (1861–1865).
Parana	United Kingdom	The ship was attacked by pirates off Hong Kong. Her crew were murdered and the ship was burnt.
Paul Jones	Confederate States of America	American Civil War: The sidewheel paddle steamer sank in the Mississippi River sometime in 1863 while lashed to the sidewheel paddle steamer Charm (Confederate States of America). Her wreck was burned to the waterline.
Return	Flag unknown	The schooner foundered in Lake Erie off Long Point, Province of Canada, British North America.
Rochebrune	France	The ship was wrecked on the Asra Pruta Shoal, off Singapore, Straits Settlements. She was on a voyage from Saigon, French Cochinchina to Shanghai, China.
Rowena	United States	The 435-ton sidewheel paddle steamer was lost on the Mississippi River. She either struck a snag and sank just above Cape Girardeau, Missouri, at either Buffalo Island or Devil Island on 18 April or she burned on 13 May.
Sam Gaty	United States	The 294-ton sidewheel paddle steamer sank in the Mississippi River at Island No. 92 either in September or on 1 October. She was later refloated.
Shawmut	Flag unknown	The full-rigged ship was lost on Bird Rock off San Francisco.
CSS Slidell	Confederate States Navy	The gunboat was lost on the Tennessee River in Tennessee sometime before 6 February.
Stephen Decatur	United States	The 308-ton sidewheel paddle steamer sank in the Mississippi River at Devil's Island below St. Louis, Missouri, sometime between 1862 and 1865. She later was refloated.
St. Jean	United Kingdom	The ship was wrecked off Timor, Netherlands East Indies. She was on a voyage from Manila, Spanish East Indies to Melbourne, Victoria.
Success	United States	The fishing schooner was lost on the Nova Scotia shore.
Sultan	United Kingdom	The whaler, a barque, was lost in ice off the coast of Greenland. Her crew were rescued.
Time and Truth	United Kingdom	The ship was wrecked at Bluff Harbour, New Zealand.
T. W. Roberts	United States	American Civil War: The 288-ton sidewheel paddle steamer was burned at Shreveport, Louisiana, to prevent her capture by Confederate forces.
CSS Talomico	Confederate States Navy	American Civil War: The armed sidewheel paddle steamer sank accidentally at Savannah, Georgia, in 1863.
Undaunted	United Kingdom	The ship was lost in the Torres Strait. She was on a voyage from Sydney, New South Wales to Calcutta.
Vermont	Flag unknown	The 255-ton steamer was lost, probably in the Great Lakes.
Victoria	United States	The four-masted schooner was burned at Port Famine, Mexico in 1863 or 1864.
William B. Romer	United States	The pilot schooner was wrecked on submerged rock – later named Romer Shoal – in New York Harbor sometime during the American Civil War. One pilot lost his life in the wreck.
Wythe	Flag unknown	The schooner sank in the James River sometime during the American Civil War.
Unidentified barge	United States	Carrying a cargo of coal, the barge was sunk in the Mississippi River off Point Pleasant, Missouri, sometime before 2 December 1863.
Unidentified floating drydock	United States	American Civil War The floating dry dock was burned by Confederate forces on the Mississippi River at Walnut Bend in August or September 1863.
Unidentified schooners	Confederate States of America	American Civil War: Confederate forces scuttled a number of schooners as blockships before 7 December to obstruct Skull Creek in South Carolina.
