= List of shipwrecks in 1864 =

The list of shipwrecks in 1864 includes ships sunk, foundered, grounded, or otherwise lost during 1864.

table of contents
← 1863 / 1864 / 1865 →
Jan	Feb	Mar	Apr
May	Jun	Jul	Aug
Sep	Oct	Nov	Dec
Unknown date

== Unknown date ==
List of shipwrecks: Unknown date 1864
Ship	State	Description
All Serene	United States	The ship capsized in the Fiji Islands. She was on a voyage from Puget Sound to Sydney, New South Wales.
Amelia	(United Kingdom of Great Britain and Ireland) Straits Settlements	The ship was wrecked in the Paracel Islands.
Australia	United Kingdom	The ship was lost in the Bali Strait. She was on a voyage from Shanghai, China to Liverpool, Lancashire.
Avalon Cleary	(United Kingdom of Great Britain and Ireland) British North America	The sealer was lost in Green Bay. Her crew survived.
Bannolong	(United Kingdom of Great Britain and Ireland) British North America	The sealer was lost in Green Bay. Her crew survived.
Belle Creole	United States	The sidewheel paddle steamer sank in the Ohio River near West Columbia, West Virginia, during the winter of 1863-1864.
Belle Peoria	United States	The sidewheel paddle steamer was wrecked in the Missouri River at Fort Buford in the Dakota Territory sometime between 1862 and 1864. She was repaired and returned to service.
Blanco	United States	The 170-ton brig capsized off the coast of Oregon off the mouth of the Siletz River and washed ashore at the river′s mouth, where Native Americans looted and burned her wreck. Her crew disappeared and were rumoured to have been killed by Native Americans.
Brandt	Flag unknown	The vessel was lost either on 19 October or 26 November, either in Yaquina Bay or off Ediz Hook, Washington Territory.
Breadalbane	United Kingdom	The ship was wrecked at Bellambi, New South Wales.
Brothers	(United Kingdom of Great Britain and Ireland) British North America	The sealer was lost in Green Bay. Her crew survived.
Carolina	Confederate States of America	American Civil War, Union blockade: The merchant ship sank in the Gulf of Mexico after departing Galveston, Texas.
Catherine	Flag unknown	American Civil War, Union blockade: During an attempt to run the Union blockade, the schooner was stranded at Sabine Pass on the border between Louisiana and Texas, Confederate States of America sometime during the American Civil War.
CSS Columbus	Confederate States Navy	American Civil War: The screw steamer was burned and sunk in the Ogeechee River in Georgia, 5 nautical miles (9.3 km) above the wreck of the sidewheel paddle steamer CSS Nashville (Confederate States Navy).
Convey	United States	The 350-ton steamer burned and sank in 12 feet (3.7 m) of water in Pensacola Bay off Pensacola, Florida, Confederate States of America.
Cordelia Ann	United States	The sternwheel paddle steamer struck a snag and sank in the Ohio River below Grandview, Indiana, during the summer of 1864.
Dr. Kane	United States	The 191-ton sternwheel paddle steamer struck a snag and sank in deep water in the Ohio River 300 yards (270 m) below the public wharf at Cairo, Illinois, sometime during the American Civil War.
Elizabeth	Flag unknown	The full-rigged ship was lost at Manasquan, New Jersey.
Elizabeth	(United Kingdom of Great Britain and Ireland) British North America	The sealer was lost in Green Bay. Her crew survived.
Ellwood	United States	The 21-ton sidewheel ferry sank on the St. Francis River in Arkansas in the autumn of 1864. She later was refloated.
Enterprise	Flag unknown	The full-rigged ship was lost at Point Chehalis on the coast of Washington Territory.
Evanthes	(United Kingdom of Great Britain and Ireland) British North America	The sealer was lost in Green Bay. Her crew survived.
Explorer	United States	The barge was torn from her moorings and sank during a flood on the Colorado River at Pilot Knob, California, near Yuma, Arizona.
Falcon	Norway	The brig ran aground on the East Barrow Sand, in the North Sea off the coast of Essex, United Kingdom. She was refloated with assistance from the tug Amazon and the smack Increase (both United Kingdom).
Fanny	Flag unknown	The sloop lost her masts, became waterlogged, and was wrecked on the coast of Washington Territory off Shoalwater Bay or Willapa Bay. Her hulk later capsized and sank after Pacific (Flag unknown) rammed it.
Fanny Lewis	Flag unknown	The 273-ton brig was wrecked off Fort Fisher, North Carolina, Confederate States of America.
CSS Gallego	Confederate States Navy	American Civil War: The schooner was run aground in a sinking condition by Confederate forces on the James River below the obstructions at Drewry's Bluff, Virginia, in late 1864. She was refloated on 18 January 1865, repaired, and returned to service.
General McNeil	Flag unknown	The sternwheel paddle steamer struck a snag and sank in the Missouri River at Howards Bend near St. Louis, sometime during the 1860s.
Gillum	United States	The steamer was wrecked during a voyage from New Orleans, Louisiana, to Matamoros, Mexico. Nine members of her crew were rescued from one of her boats in the Gulf of Mexico off Sabine Pass by the armed screw steamer USS Circassian (United States Navy) on 3 September. The schooner Cora (Flag unknown) picked up the rest of her crew.
Harriet Ridley	(United Kingdom of Great Britain and Ireland) British North America	The sealer was lost in Green Bay with the loss of all hands.
Hartford	Flag unknown	The barque was wrecked on the Humboldt Bar in Humboldt Bay on the coast of California in either October 1861 or October 1864.
Helena Lavinia	(United Kingdom of Great Britain and Ireland) British North America	The sealer was lost in Green Bay. Her crew survived.
J. E. Murcock	Flag unknown	The schooner may have been stranded in Mendocino County, California, during 1864.
J. H. Done	United States	American Civil War: The 211-ton sternwheel paddle steamer was lost on the Arkansas River at Scotia, Arkansas.
CSS John F. Carr	Confederate States Navy	The 200-ton sidewheel cottonclad gunboat may have been wrecked in Matagorda Bay on the coast of Texas.
John Rumsey	United States	The 39-ton steamer was lost at St. Paul, Minnesota.
Lady Prudhoe	United Kingdom	The ship foundered off Cape Horn, Chile. Her crew were rescued.
La Salle	United States	The 196-ton sternwheel paddle steamer struck a snag and sank in the Mississippi River at Cape Girardeau, Missouri, in either August or late September.
Lilledale	(United Kingdom of Great Britain and Ireland) British North America	The sealer was lost in Green Bay. Her crew survived.
Louis	Glag unknown	The ship foundered in Lake Boden. Attempts to raise her by means of air bags were unsuccessful.
Louisa	United States	The 250-ton sidewheel paddle steamer was scuttled in the Missouri River at South Point, Missouri, after her cargo caught fire.
Louisville	United States	The 288-ton sternwheel paddle steamer struck a snag and sank below Sioux City, Iowa, and Fort Randall in Dakota Territory in either April or May.
Marens	Flag unknown	The brig sank in the James River sometime during the American Civil War (1861-1865).
Martha	Norway	The whaler was crushed by ice and sank off Greenland. Her crew survived.
Mary Lou	United States	Carrying a cargo of whiskey, the steamer was lost on the Missouri River below Omaha, Nebraska Territory.
Monio	Flag unknown	The brig was lost near Manasquan, New Jersey.
Noyo	United States	The 95-ton schooner was wrecked on Coos Bay Bar in Coos Bay off the coast of Oregon and burned to the waterline.
Ocean Bird	United States	The barque either was lost in the Pacific Ocean southwest of Cape Flattery on the coast of Washington Territory on 19 March, or she disappeared on 3 April.
Orion	United States	The 138-ton sternwheel paddle steamer struck a snag and sank in the Missouri River at Eureka Landing, Missouri.
Osiris	Confederate States of America	American Civil War: The 145- or 183-ton sidewheel paddle steamer, operated as a ferry by the Confederate Quartermaster Department on the coast of South Carolina between Charleston, Castle Pickney, and Sullivan's Island, was destroyed by a fire allegedly set by Union sympathizers sometime during the American Civil War (1861-1865).
Packet	(United Kingdom of Great Britain and Ireland) British North America	The sealer was lost in Green Bay with the loss of all hands.
Pride of the Huon	(United Kingdom of Great Britain and Ireland) New Zealand	The schooner, operated by the Canterbury Provincial Government was lost while leaving harbour on New Zealand's South Island West Coast, probably at Martins Bay, sometime prior to March 1864. The crew survived the wreck, but one died on the arduous trek across mountainous country to the nearest town, Queenstown.
Rialto	United States	The sternwheel paddle steamer sank in the Missouri River at the mouth of Bee Creek, about 2 nautical miles (3.7 km) downstream of Weston, Missouri.
Shannon	(United Kingdom of Great Britain and Ireland) British North America	The sealer was lost in Green Bay. Her crew survived.
Stephen Decatur	United States	The 308-ton sidewheel paddle steamer sank in the Mississippi River at Devil's Island below St. Louis, Missouri, sometime between 1862 and 1865. She was later refloated.
Superior	(United Kingdom of Great Britain and Ireland) British North America	The sealer was lost in Green Bay. Her crew survived.
Victoria	United States	The four-masted schooner was burned at Port Famine Slough in Mexico in 1863 or 1864.
William B. Romer	United States	The pilot schooner was wrecked on submerged rock – later named Romer Shoal – in New York Harbor off New York sometime during the American Civil War. One pilot lost his life in the wreck.
Wythe	Flag unknown	The schooner sank in the James River sometime during the American Civil War.
Twelve barges	United States	American Civil War: The barges Buena Vista, Commodore Stockton, Fort (112 tons), John McHale (122 tons), John Mitchell (114 tons), Margaret and Rebecca (125 tons), Mary Ann, Mary Linda (116 tons), Musadora (123 tons), Pilgrim (126 tons), Richard Vaux (120 tons), and Rolling Wave (112 tons) and two unnamed barges (all United States) were purchased to be scuttled as blockships at Trent's Reach in the James River by Union forces and were loaded with 60 short tons (54.4 metric tons/tonnes) of stone each. Three of the barges sank while under tow from Baltimore, Maryland, to Hampton Roads, Virginia, sometime after 13 July, two sank at Hampton Roads, five were scuttled on 20 July at Trent′s Reach, and two were scuttled later in Trent's Reach. Which of the barges sank in which location and when was not recorded.
Unidentified large boat	Confederate States of America	American Civil War: The boat was destroyed by the vessel Brinker (United States) in the James River ca. December 1864.
