= George Creed =

Australian politician

George Albert Creed OAM (9 February 1940 - 29 November 2010) was an Australian politician, best known for his work in local government in Queensland.

He is notable for serving as the final mayor of Calliope Shire Council and as the first mayor of Gladstone Regional Council.

== Early life ==
Creed was born in Rockhampton. He completed his primary education through correspondence while growing up on "Cecilwood", near Raglan before attending Rockhampton Grammar School.

He married Leonie Dunning on 5 September 1964 after which they moved into their home at "The Old Station", a cattle property where Creed bred Brahman cattle. George and Leonie Creed had three children.

To make ends meet during the 1970's beef slump, Creed commenced employment at Queensland Alumina in Gladstone while Leonie worked as a teacher aide at Mount Larcom State School.

== Local government ==
Prompted by his dissatisfaction with Calliope Shire Council at the time, he became interested in local politics and decided to follow in the footsteps of his grandfather who served as a councillor from 1907 to 1929 during which time he was chairman from 1908 to 1910 and again in 1914.

Creed was first elected as a councillor on Calliope Shire Council on 27 March 1976, becoming mayor on 18 July 1995 succeeding Liz Cunningham.

He served as Calliope Shire mayor until the amalgamations on 15 March 2008 which saw the Calliope and Miriam Vale shires merge with Gladstone City Council to form the new Gladstone Regional Council. Creed was opposed to the amalgamation of the local government areas.

In 2008, Creed was elected as the inaugural mayor of Gladstone Regional Council, winning with 54.16% of the vote, beating opponents Len Smith, Karen Sorensen and Stephen Mills.

However, he was diagnosed with lung cancer on 24 December 2009 and was required to undergo chemotherapy. His ill health prompted his resignation from the position on 21 September 2010 which triggered a by-election which was won by Gail Sellers.

== Other roles ==
Creed held various positions with a range of organisations including as director of the Gladstone Ports Corporation, as a member of the Gladstone Economic and Industry Board, as chairman of the Gladstone-Calliope Counter Disaster Committee, president of The Old Station Flying Club and as a member of the Gladstone-Calliope Aerodrome Board.

Creed was a volunteer fire fighter with the rural fire brigade for over 45 years, for which he received the Volunteer Medal.

He was also a pilot, obtaining his fixed-wing license in 1986. He is credited with establishing The Old Station Fly-in and Air Show in 1992, as an event to raise money for the Royal Flying Doctor Service and the Capricorn Helicopter Rescue Service.

== Death ==
Creed died on 29 November 2010 at Rockhampton Mater Hospital, prompting a range of tributes from community and political leaders including Kevin Rudd, Anna Bligh, Paul Neville, Liz Cunningham and Ken O'Dowd.

His funeral was held on "The Old Station" which was attended by numerous notable dignitaries. Creed was then buried on his property, "Langmorn".

== Recognition ==
For his services as a volunteer fire fighter and fire warden, Creed was awarded the National Medal and National Medal - 1st clasp in 1994.

In 2001, Creed was awarded the Centenary Medal in recognition of his distinguished service to local government.

Creed was awarded the Medal of the Order of Australia in the 2006 Australia Day Honours in recognition for his service to Calliope Shire and for his contributions to the region's development.

In 2011, the terminal at Gladstone Airport was named the Creed-Kanofski Terminal in honour of Creed and chief executive officer Graeme Kanofski in honour of their roles in the airport's expansion and redevelopment.
