= Raglan, Queensland =

Raglan
- Town
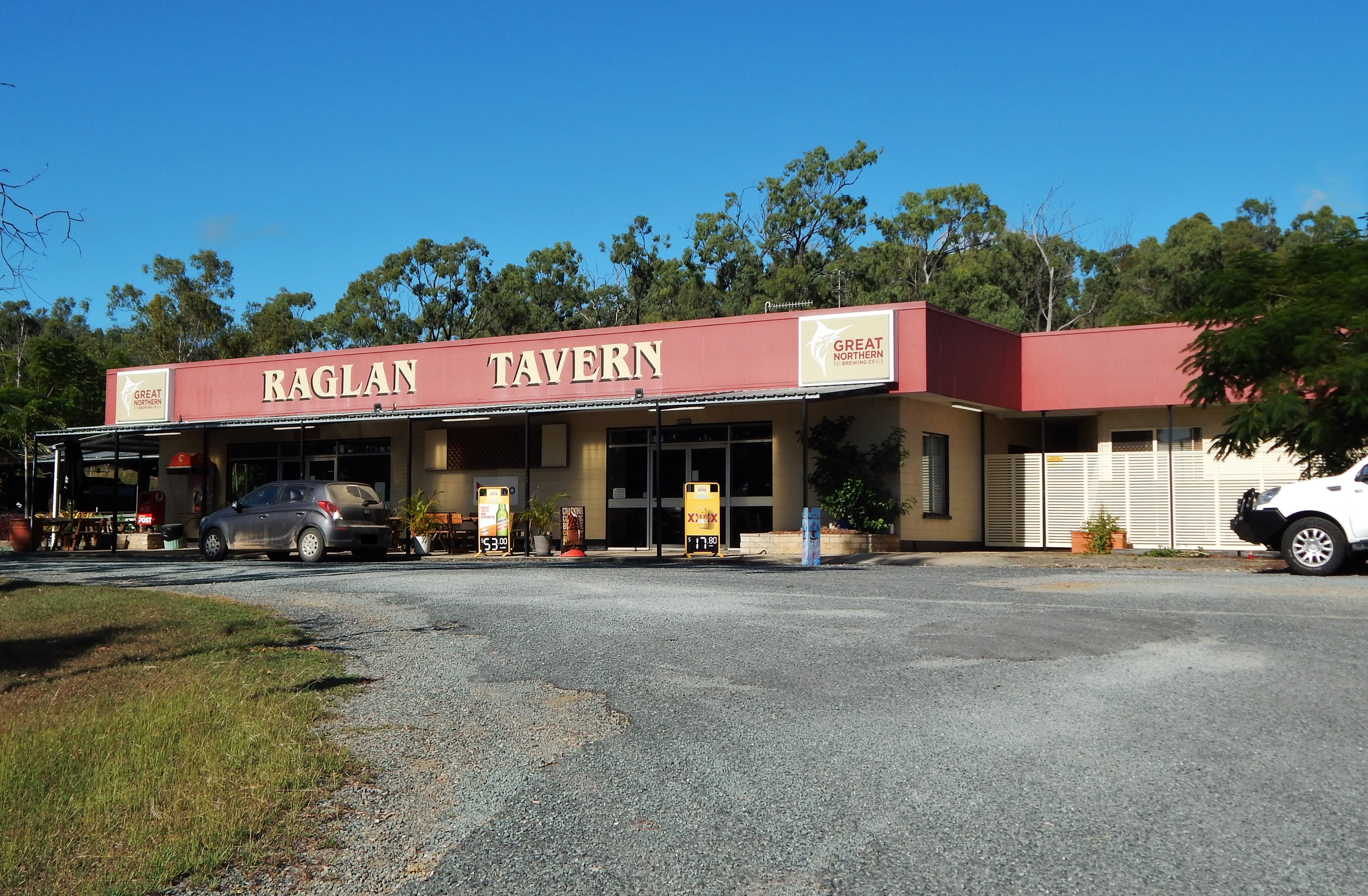
- Raglan Tavern, 2022

- Interactive map of Raglan
- Coordinates: 23.7161°S 150.8188°E
- Country: Australia
- State: Queensland
- LGA: Gladstone Region
- Location: 20.4 km (12.7 mi) NW of Mount Larcom; 52.0 km (32.3 mi) NW of Gladstone; 56.0 km (34.8 mi) SE of Rockhampton; 559 km (347 mi) NNW of Brisbane

Government
  - State electorate: Gladstone
  - Federal division: Flynn

Area
  - Total: 596.6 km^{2} (230.3 sq mi)

Population
  - Total: 143 (2021 census)
  - Density: 0.2397/km^{2} (0.6208/sq mi)
- Time zone: UTC+10:00 (AEST)
- Postcode: 4697
Localities around Raglan
Marmor	The Narrows	Darts Creek
Bajool	Raglan	Ambrose
Ulogie	Mount Alma	Bracewell

Raglan is a rural town and locality in the Gladstone Region, Queensland, Australia. In the 2021 census, the locality of Raglan had a population of 143 people.

== Geography ==
The town of Raglan is located in the north of the locality. It is on Raglan Creek, which flows into Keppel Bay.

The locality contains the following mountains:

- King Solomon Spur (23.8515°S 150.6162°E) 230 metres (750 ft)
- Marble Mountain (23.9004°S 150.6556°E) 330 metres (1,080 ft)
- Mount Alma (23.9594°S 150.8047°E) 748 metres (2,454 ft)
- Mount Bennett (23.8927°S 150.7686°E) 409 metres (1,342 ft)
- Mount Bomboolba (23.7801°S 150.6980°E) 412 metres (1,352 ft)
- Mount Despair (23.7931°S 150.8105°E) 290 metres (950 ft)
- Mount Erebus (23.7809°S 150.7911°E) 350 metres (1,150 ft)
- Mount Holly (23.7714°S 150.8283°E) 256 metres (840 ft)
- Mount Wendy (23.9348°S 150.6667°E) 657 metres (2,156 ft)

These ranges are a significant source of marble and calcite, and the South Ulam mine is located there.

The Bruce Highway enters the locality from the east (Ambrose), passes through the town along Raglan Street, and exits to the north-west (Marmor).

The North Coast railway line runs roughly parallel and north of the highway and passes through the locality with the following stations (from east to west):

- Epala railway station (23.7600°S 150.8797°E)
- Amos railway station (23.7423°S 150.8406°E), now abandoned
- Raglan railway station (23.7181°S 150.8197°E) serving the town

Amos is a neighbourhood in the locality (23.7333°S 150.85°E) in the vicinity of the Amos railway station.

There are two airstrips in the locality:

- Mt Bennett station airstrip (23.9070°S 150.7625°E)
- The Old Station airstrip (23.8220°S 150.8238°E)

The land use is predominantly grazing on native vegetation with some crop growing.

== History ==
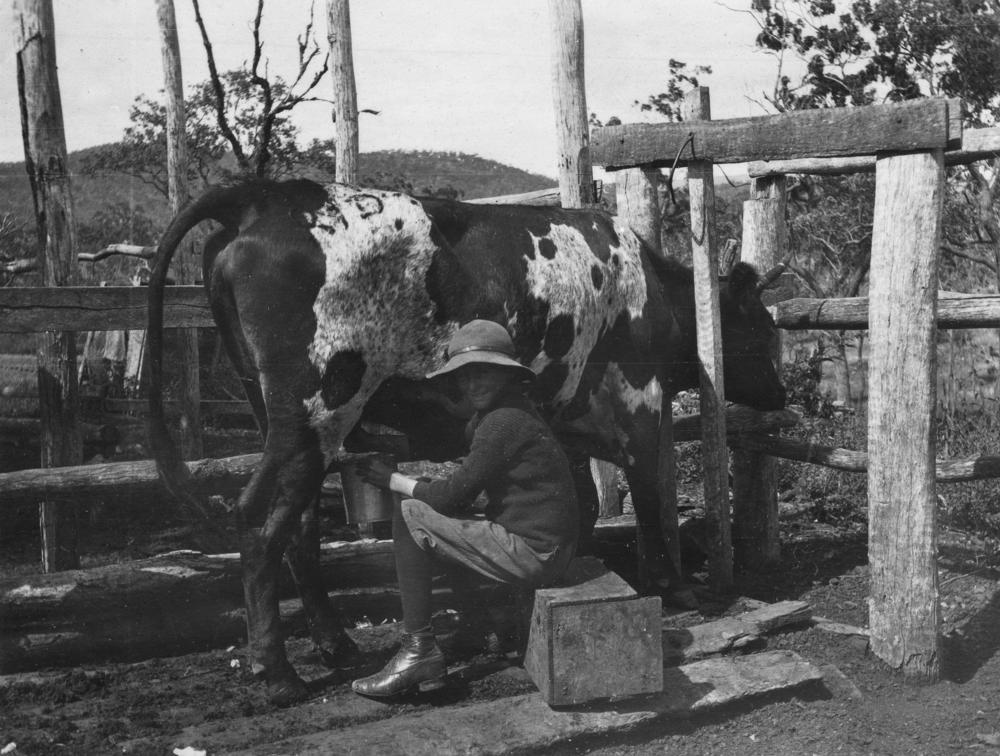
Milking the cow at Ambrose's farm, Raglan, 1912

The region was first declared as the County of Raglan and opened for British pastoral squatting in January 1854. The name Raglan was in honour of Fitzroy James Henry Somerset, First Baron Raglan (1788-1855), first Commander in Chief British Army in Crimea.

British occupation began in early January 1856 during a punitive expedition led by Lieutenant John Murray of the Native Police. Murray was tracking down local Aboriginal tribes suspected of involvement in the killing of five people at nearby Mount Larcombe sheep station. With a posse comitatus of around twenty armed and mounted men, including troopers, constables and colonists, Murray surrounded a "large mob" of about a hundred Aboriginal people camped on a creek near to where the township of Raglan now stands. At the break of dawn, Murray's group attacked the camp and "bullets from a score or more carbines wrought death," with those being shot at running "from side to side in their frantic efforts to escape." Only a few escaped and these "were pursued and either shot or driven into the waters of [Keppel] Bay." A participant later wrote that the ammunition they used during the attack had become exhausted and that they had to use their rifles as clubs. Many of the Aboriginal people were killed or terribly wounded but no casualties were recorded amongst Murray's group.

The creek where this occurred was named Hourigan's Creek after the man who fired the first shot of the massacre. This shot was at "a huge savage who [was] seen to get up and stretch himself," the rest of the Aboriginal camp still being asleep. The creek is still called Hourigan's Creek and is still used for shooting with the Raglan Target Sports Association complex being located on its banks. An early resident of Raglan recorded that when he first came to the area he noticed that "the skulls of black warriors...had been made into an ornamental border for a large flower bed in the garden" of the homestead of Raglan Station.

Raglan was established as a pastoral sheep station in 1857 by William Landsborough who held it for several years before selling it on. The allotments for the township of Raglan were first surveyed in 1865.

Gold was found in Raglan in 1867. In August 1867 a nugget of gold was found. Described as "a monster", it was 16 inches (41 cm) long and 4 inches (10 cm) wide, weighing 30 pounds (14 kg) and worth £1,400. There were around 300 gold diggers active at the Raglan goldfield at that time.

Raglan Creek Provisional School opened on 4 August 1879, but closed on 31 October 1879. It reopened on 5 March 1883, and became Raglan Creek State School on 1 January 1909. In 1911 it was renamed Raglan State School. The school closed on 13 December 1996. The school was at 18 Langmorn Street (23.7196°S 150.8237°E).

Langmorn Creek Crossing Provisional School opened on 20 October 1915 but closed circa 31 January 1916. It reopened as Langmorn Provisional School circa January 1926. On 1 January 1931 it became Langmorn State School. It closed on 26 October 1941, but reopened on 26 October 1944. It closed finally on 11 May 1962. It was at 187 Langmore School Road, now in Ambrose (23.8185°S 150.8823°E).

Hourigan Creek State School opened in 1916 and closed circa 1932. It was located on or near Hourigan Creek Road (approx 23.7378°S 150.7829°E).

The Raglan Memorial Hall was built in about 1932 and was used for dances until 1990, after which it stood idle. It was relocated to the Calliope River Historical Village in March 2002 and officially re-opened by George Creed, the mayor of Calliope Shire.

== Demographics ==
In the 2011 census, the locality of Raglan Raglan was included with neighbouring Ambrose and together had a population of 545 people.

In the 2016 census, the locality of Raglan had a population of 146 people.

In the 2021 census, the locality of Raglan had a population of 143 people.

== Heritage listings ==
Raglan has a number of heritage-listed sites, including:

- Langmorn Homestead, Langmorn Road (23.8352°S 150.7544°E)
- Parson's Inn, Raglan Station Road (23.7407°S 150.8448°E)
- Raglan Homestead, Raglan Station Road (23.7328°S 150.8828°E)

== Education ==
There are no schools in Raglan. The nearest government primary schools are Marmor State School in neighbouring Marmor to the north-west, Ambrose State School in neighbouring Ambrose to the east, and Bajool State School in neighbouring Bajool to the west. The nearest government secondary schools is Mount Larcom State School (to Year 10) in Mount Larcom to the south-east. For secondary education to Year 12, the nearest government secondary schools are Gladstone State High School in West Gladstone, Gladstone, to the south-east and Rockhampton State High School in Wandal, Rockhampton, to the north-east.

== Facilities ==
Raglan Cemetery is at 75 Hourigan Creek Road (23.7159°S 150.8082°E).

== Amenities ==
The Old Station is a flying club at 123 Langmorn Road (23.8222°S 150.8125°E) near The Old Station airstrip.

== See also ==
- List of schools in Central Queensland
