= Cape Manifold =

Headland in Queensland, Australia

- Coordinates: 22°41′S 150°50′E
- Country: Australia
- State: Queensland

Cape Manifold (22°41′S 150°50′E) is a coastal headland in central Queensland, Australia.

It was named by Captain Cook when he saw it from Keppel Bay (to the south) on 27 May 1770, "from the Number of high Hills over it". He spelt it both Manyfold and Manifold in different journal entries; today Manifold is usual.
