= Port Famine =

Port Famine may refer to:

- Port Famine, Sonora, a 19th-century steamboat landing and woodyard on the lower Colorado River in Sonora, Mexico
- Puerto del Hambre ("Port Famine"), also known as Ciudad del Rey Don Felipe, a historic settlement site in Chile on the Strait of Magellan
