= Parson's Inn =

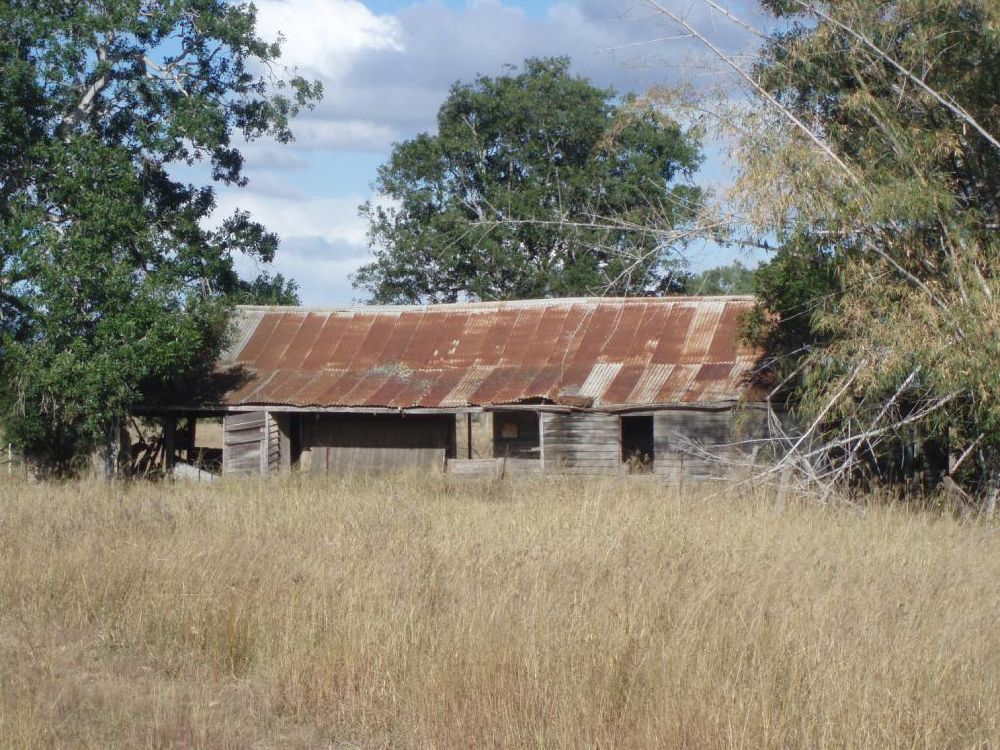
- Parson's Inn, from Raglan Station Road, 2009

- Location within Queensland Location within Australia
- 23.7407°S 150.8448°E
- Location: Raglan Station Road, Raglan, Gladstone Region, Queensland, Australia

History
- Design period: 1870s - 1890s (late 19th century)
- Built: c. 1885 - 1950s

Queensland Heritage Register
- Official name: Parson's Inn
- Type: state heritage (archaeological, built)
- Designated: 31 July 2006
- Reference no.: 600388
- Significant period: 1880s-1950s (fabric) c. 1885-1900s (historical use)
- Significant components: tank stand, sawpit, yards - livestock, residential accommodation - main house, shed - milking, mill - wind

Parson's Inn is a heritage-listed former hotel at Raglan Station Road, Raglan, Gladstone Region, Queensland, Australia. It was built from c. 1885 to 1950s. It was added to the Queensland Heritage Register on 31 July 2006.

== History ==
The former Parson's Inn buildings are timber vernacular structures located approximately 5 kilometres (3.1 mi) south of Raglan on the old coach road, now bypassed by the Bruce Highway. The proprietor of this wayside inn from 1885 until the early 1900s was Edwin Parson, and the property has remained in the possession of members of his family.

The area in which the inn is situated was surveyed for pastoral settlement in 1855, and most of County of Clinton was soon taken up as runs producing wool. This included Raglan, which was selected by William Landsborough and by 1857 was occupied by James and John Landsborough. By 1865, cattle were established in the district and soon replaced sheep. By 1867, there were over 180 runs in the district, and a goldfield was proclaimed at Raglan, just south of Mount Holly. Miners from this field were later to frequent Parson's Inn, paying for their rations in gold. Following the Crown Lands Alienation Act in 1868, the huge early runs were broken up and resumed for selection as smaller grazing properties. The number of cattle being raised and transported in the Port Curtis area increased following the setting up of the Lakes Creek meatworks in 1871.

Edwin Parson's name first appears in the Post Office Directory of 1874 as being at Long Morn. He selected 517 acres (209 ha) at Black's Crossing, Raglan, in 1873 and an adjoining selection of 667 acres (270 ha) in 1874. On 5 May 1979, a mention is made in the diary of Stephen Creed of Langmorn station of an E Parsons "in charge of 169 fat bullocks to be delivered to Brisbane by road", which may well refer to Edwin Parsons. The purchase of his selections was finalised in 1881.

Black's Crossing was the local name for a section of Raglan Creek crossed by a stock route. The places where major routes crossed watercourses were often used as camps by drovers and carriers and were excellent locations for inns that catered to travellers. These were places where one could obtain food and accommodation for people and horses, where it was usually possible to obtain the services of a blacksmith, leave or collect messages and gain information on the condition of the road ahead. The inns were also a social amenity as a source of company and conviviality on the road. Their services made the development of regular supply routes possible, which in turn made a major contribution to the way in which areas were opened up for European settlement.

Parson obtained a license for a hostelry named the Raglan Hotel at Black's Crossing in 1885. Although his name appears in most documents as Parsons, it is spelt on the hotel's signboard on a 19th-century photograph without the "s". He had not held a publican's license before, and the license was in his name until 1902. It then passed to Joseph Jones and was held briefly by David Parsons in 1905, after which no further licenses were issued. It is probable that the inn operated only during the period when there was sufficient traffic on this road to support it. The route was also used for mail, a post office having opened in Raglan in 1879, although the mail was carried on horseback until 1887, when a weekly coach served the route.

It is not certain whether the building was constructed as an inn or whether an existing building was modified, but it had both slabs and sawn boards for wall cladding at an early stage of its existence. A saw pit is still visible behind the building. In the use of bush pole frames for the building and window openings, pit sawn weatherboards, pegged floorboards, adzed slabs and other details, the inn provides examples of a range of early building techniques and demonstrates what could be achieved in a remote spot using the materials available to hand.

The hotel is described in a diary of Lady Lamington, wife of the Governor of Queensland Lord Lamington between 1896 and 1901. In 1897, while travelling privately to meet her husband at Rockhampton on his return from New Guinea, her boat encountered bad weather, and it was agreed that she, her husband's secretary and his wife should hire a vehicle and driver and travel the last section overland. They stayed one night at the Raglan Hotel, "a wooden hut with some small trees nearby." The hotel was run by a woman and her children, one of whom had recently died and who she had buried, presumably in the vicinity of the inn. Lady Lamington remembered that:

"We were shown into the house, one rather small centre room with a sort of counter on one side for a bar, and behind this room were two or three bedrooms. The floor and walls were of planks which had shrunk after being put up, so we could with little effort, see what was going on in the next room, and as the floor was the same, I used to see the chickens scratching the ground under the floor between the short wooden piles on which the little Hotel!!! was built. The walls had coloured and uncoloured illustrations from different newspapers stuck on them in places, which made one's room a little more private. There was only one bedroom and a sort of press with a bed in it. We had only one very small basin between us for our ablutions. It was easy to empty it by just opening a wooden window, but not so easy to get the water to fill it again. I have seen a good deal during my travels but sitting there in the little Bush shanty listening to this good woman's stories was very touching. Next morning I was woke up by hearing the children bringing in the cows for milking"

A photograph, which survives, was taken of the inn on this occasion by Pascoe Stuart, the Governor's secretary. Since then, rooms have been added to the ends of the building, but the simple rectangular form and open area at the front remain.

In 1904, some of Parson's land was resumed for the railway, which opened in 1910. A new certificate of title was issued to him in 1904 for 491 acres (199 ha) giving his address as Sunnyside, Raglan. Although the inn was no longer licensed, it appeared as a hotel in the Post Office Directory until 1909 and may still have been used to accommodate travellers. The introduction of the railway no doubt cut traffic considerably on the old road and Edwin Parson was listed in the Post Office Directory as a selector before he died in 1911. The property was left to Walter Parsons, who leased it to John Patrick Mitchell in 1912 for 21 years.

The Port Curtis Dairy Association was formed in 1906 and opened a dairy co-operative in Gladstone and in Rockhampton in 1928. This provided the opportunity for the development of the dairy industry in the area. For many years, until the late 1950s, the property on which Parson's Inn was located was run as a dairy farm. Walter Parsons lived in a 2 storeyed house nearby, the frame of which is still standing, while a family who worked on the farm occupied the inn. The property passed to Edwin Miles Parsons in February 1961. In 1970, it was surrendered to the Crown and a new Deed of Grant issued on 31 March 1971 for 491 acres (199 ha) to allow for road resumptions. The land passed to the current owner, also a family member, in 1982.

It has been over 35 years since the building was occupied, and it was used until recently for storing hay. A storm is said to have removed much of the cladding from the rear about 10–15 years ago. The stables behind the inn, recorded in the National Trust's survey of 1981, have gone with no visible trace. The small pole-framed building standing in yards near the house is said to have been used as a dairy. Its age is unknown, but it may be contemporary with the inn as similar construction techniques have been employed. No family documentation relating to the inn is known to survive.

== Description ==
Parsons Inn is located a little south of Raglan Creek, halfway along the old coach road between Gladstone and Rockhampton, which has been bypassed. The former inn is set parallel with the road and is a single-storeyed timber building on low stumps.

The building has a frame of bush poles and was originally clad at least partially with slabs, although most of these seem to have been replaced many years ago with weatherboards. The broken back roof is clad in corrugated iron. The front has an open verandah section in the centre and rooms on either side of this. These rooms have been extended. Behind this is a large room with lined walls and ceiling. At the rear are small rooms and a veranda which has lost most of its cladding and a section of roof.

The windows are between uprights of bush timber, as are the doors. The floors are of pit-sawn boards fastened to the bearers in places with large rectangular wooden pegs cut from pieces of pit-sawn timber. The sawpit is still visible close behind the building, though it has been filled in for safety reasons. Some sections originally open have been built in. The front wall, most interior walls and the ceilings of the main section are clad with beaded boards. The main room is lined with wide plain boards and has a stencilled dado on the end walls. The upper wall is pale blue and the lower wall pinkish grey, divided by a pink line and a grey/pink stencilled anthemion pattern above. Some boards that carried part of this design have been removed.

The former residence is a two-storeyed timber-framed building clad with weatherboards, with verandahs to both levels at each end and a galvanised iron roof. This building is now little more than a frame and is leaning precariously.

Beyond this house is a small weatherboard-clad building with a pole frame standing in the remains of a post and rail enclosure. A roofed open area adjoins the building and leads into the yard section. There is a windmill and a water tank on stumps alongside.

It is thought that there are graves some distance behind the inn, but these were not located. The area around the inn is of value as an archaeological site, which may yield further information on the way in which such early wayside inns were operated.

== Heritage listing ==
Parson's Inn was listed on the Queensland Heritage Register on 31 July 2006, having satisfied the following criteria.

The place is important in demonstrating the evolution or pattern of Queensland's history.

The former Raglan Hotel, or Parson's Inn, illustrates the pattern of European settlement in Queensland as a wayside inn serving early an early route for the movement of livestock, essential supplies and mail. Such inns were an important element in the settlement of remote areas.

The place demonstrates rare, uncommon or endangered aspects of Queensland's cultural heritage.

The inn is rare in Queensland, as although many such travellers' inns were built, few examples using local materials, such as this one, have survived. It is thought that no other example of the technique used to peg the floor boards to the bearers has been identified in Queensland.

The place has potential to yield information that will contribute to an understanding of Queensland's history.

The inn, its subsidiary structures and the area around them which formed part of the inn yards have the potential to reveal information about the operation of early hotels in Queensland.

The place is important in demonstrating the principal characteristics of a particular class of cultural places.

The former Parson's Inn is a good example of its kind and preserves many examples of early building techniques.

The place has a special association with the life or work of a particular person, group or organisation of importance in Queensland's history.

The inn has associations with several generations of the Parsons family, who were early settlers in the area.
