= Bajool, Queensland =

Bajool
- Town
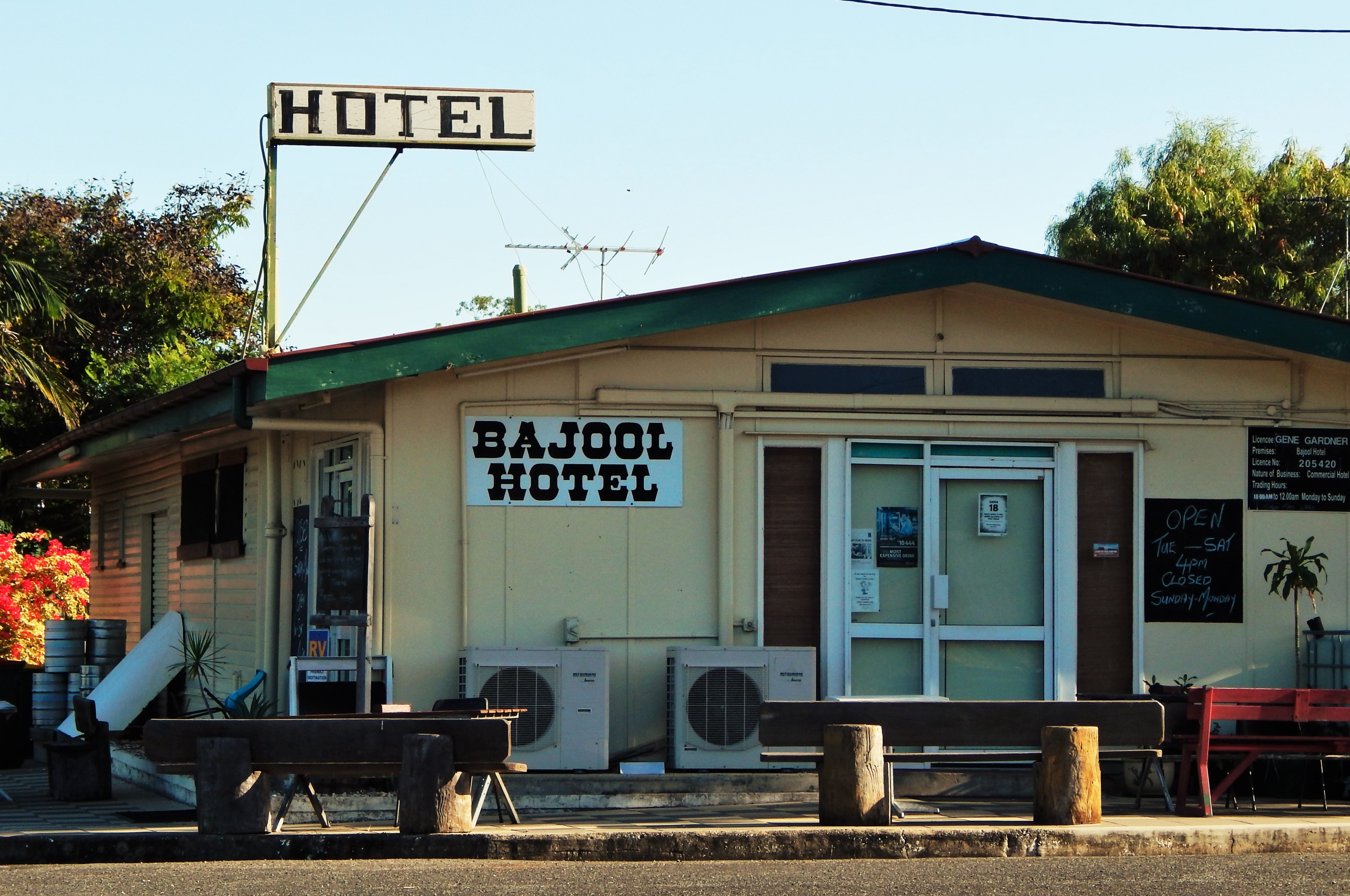
- Bajool Hotel, 2022

- Interactive map of Bajool
- Coordinates: 23.6511°S 150.6419°E
- Country: Australia
- State: Queensland
- LGA: Rockhampton Region
- Location: 35.9 km (22.3 mi) SSE of Rockhampton; 40.6 km (25.2 mi) NW of Mount Larcom; 55.3 km (34.4 mi) E of Mount Morgan; 597 km (371 mi) NNW of Brisbane

Government
  - State electorate: Mirani
  - Federal division: Flynn

Area
  - Total: 588.4 km^{2} (227.2 sq mi)

Population
  - Total: 447 (2021 census)
  - Density: 0.7597/km^{2} (1.9676/sq mi)
- Time zone: UTC+10:00 (AEST)
- Postcode: 4699
Localities around Bajool
| Bouldercombe; Struck Oil | Midgee | Port Alma |
| Limestone; Nine Mile Creek | Bajool | Marmor |
| Fletcher Creek | Ulogie | Raglan |

Bajool is a rural town and locality in the Rockhampton Region, Queensland, Australia. In the 2021 census, the locality of Bajool had a population of 447 people.

== Geography ==
Bajool is located on the Bruce Highway, 35 kilometres (22 mi) south of Rockhampton and 74 kilometres (46 mi) north of Gladstone. Eight-Mile Creek flows to the east of the town.

The North Coast railway line enters the locality from the west (Marmor) and exits to the north (Midgee) with two railway stations serving the locality (from north to south):

- Archer railway station (23.5839°S 150.5838°E)
- Bajool railway station, serving the town (23.6517°S 150.6447°E)

The Bruce Highway runs almost parallel and immediately south of the railway line, except that it bypasses the town to the west.

The locality has the following mountains:

- Beschs Hill (23.8161°S 150.5509°E) 528 metres (1,732 ft)
- Mount Gindiwarra (23.7756°S 150.7100°E) 398 metres (1,306 ft)
- Mount Helen (23.8072°S 150.5936°E) 633 metres (2,077 ft)
- Mount Hopeful (23.7299°S 150.5339°E) 634 metres (2,080 ft)
- Mount Kelly (23.8012°S 150.6506°E) 310 metres (1,020 ft)
- Mount Mccamley (23.8035°S 150.6556°E) 319 metres (1,047 ft)

== History ==
The town takes its name from the Bajool railway station which was named by the Queensland Railways Department in 1903 using the Aboriginal name for the lagoon on the Archer brothers' property Gracemere. The name of the lagoon has also been written as Padgole and Badul. It has been suggested that the meaning of the name was Big Fella water hole or stop here.

A provisional school opened on 12 March 1888 at Eight Mile Creek under teacher Mr Beck (brother of J. Beck, chairman of the Fitzroy Shire Council); it closed in 1892. The school reopened on 30 September 1895 with teacher Michael Donovan, but closed again on 18 September 1896. On 5 February 1900, a part-time provisional school was established in a private home at a short-lived mining field called San Jose with 10 students under teacher William MacLean. On 2 September 1902, another part-time school was opened in conjunction at the home of Mr H. Cross in Bajool with 6 students. In August 1903, the two part-time schools were combined into Bajool Provisional School with 31 students in another building on Cross's property. In 1903 the school closed for a while and the land it was using was resumed for the railway line from Gladstone to Rockhampton. However, the railway enabled Bajool to grow. The school re-opened on the southern side of Mill Street in late 1904, and became Bajool State School in 1909.

Ulam Upper Provisional School opened circa 1892. On 1 January 1909, it became Ulam Upper State School. It closed circa 1961.

In 1892, local people in South Ulam applied for a school as there were 21 children in the area. However, disagreements as to the size and location of the school site delayed obtaining government approval. By December 1893, the school building was completed, having been fully funded by local people as they received no government money. Ulam South Provisional School opened on 22 January 1894. On 1 January 1909, it became Ulam South State School. It closed in 1925. It was on a 5-acre (2.0 ha) site at 1385 South Ulam Road near the junction with Comerford Road (23.76616°S 150.63318°E).

== Demographics ==
In the 2011 census, the locality of Bajool had a population of 543 people.

In the 2016 census, the locality of Bajool had a population of 455 people.

In the 2021 census, the locality of Bajool had a population of 447 people.

== Education ==
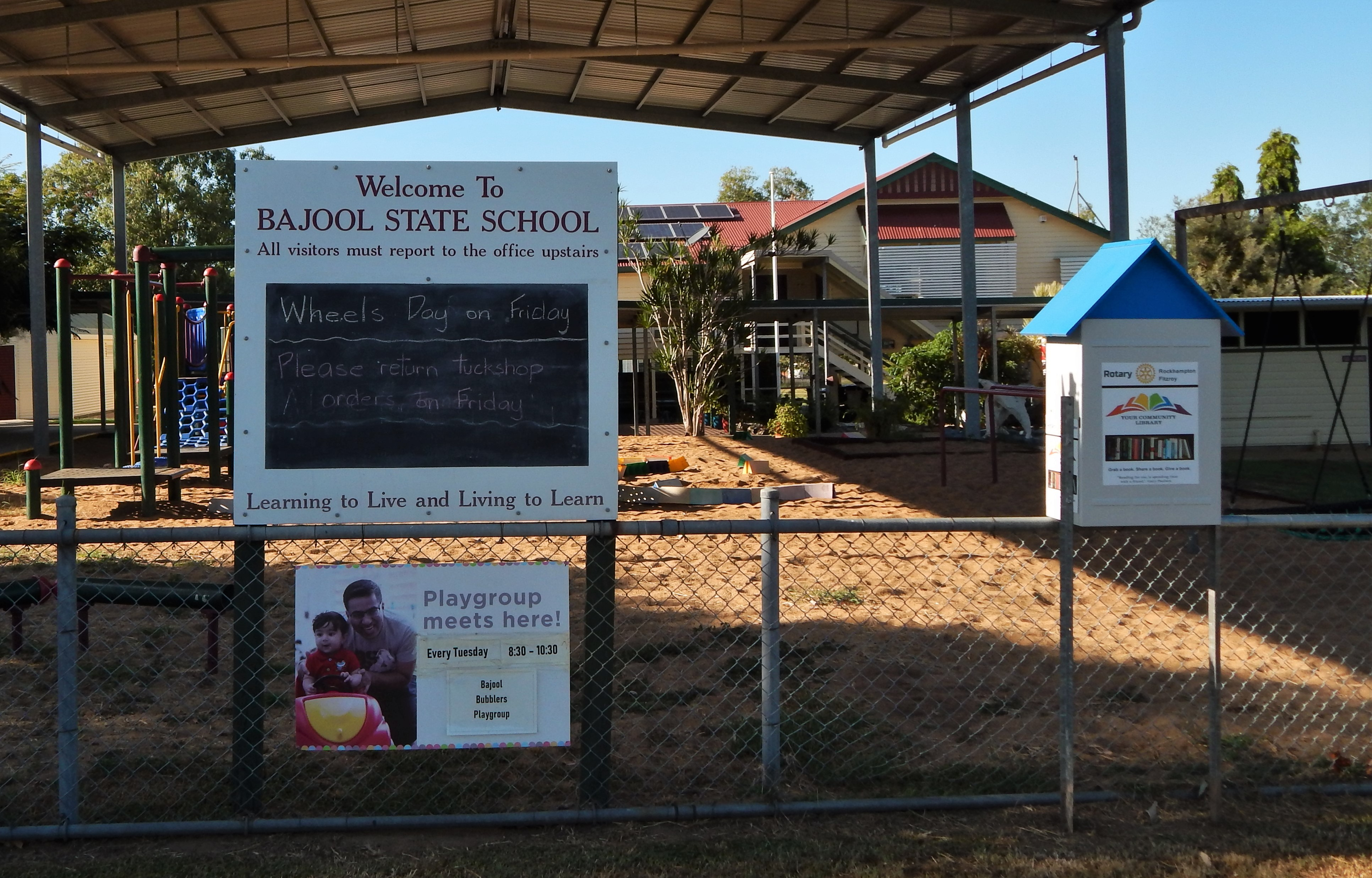
Bajool State School, 2022

Bajool State School is a government primary (Prep–6) school for boys and girls at 54-60 Toonda Street (23.6523°S 150.6467°E). In 2012, the school had 39 students and 2 teachers. In 2018, the school had an enrolment of 40 students with 4 teachers (3 full-time equivalent) and 5 non-teaching staff (2 full-time equivalent).

There are no secondary schools in Bajool. The nearest government secondary schools are Mount Larcom State School (to Year 10) in Mount Larcom to the south-east, Mount Morgan State High School (to Year 12) in Mount Morgan to the west, and Rockhampton State High School (to Year 12) in Wandal, Rockhampton, to the north.

== Facilities ==
Bajool is the site of one of four Queensland Government explosives reserves (also known as "magazines"). The magazine is about 29 kilometres (18 mi) by road from the shipping wharf at Port Alma. From 1912 to 1986 a rail line ran from Bajool to Port Alma.

Bajool Cemetery is at 18 School Road (23.6519°S 150.6485°E).

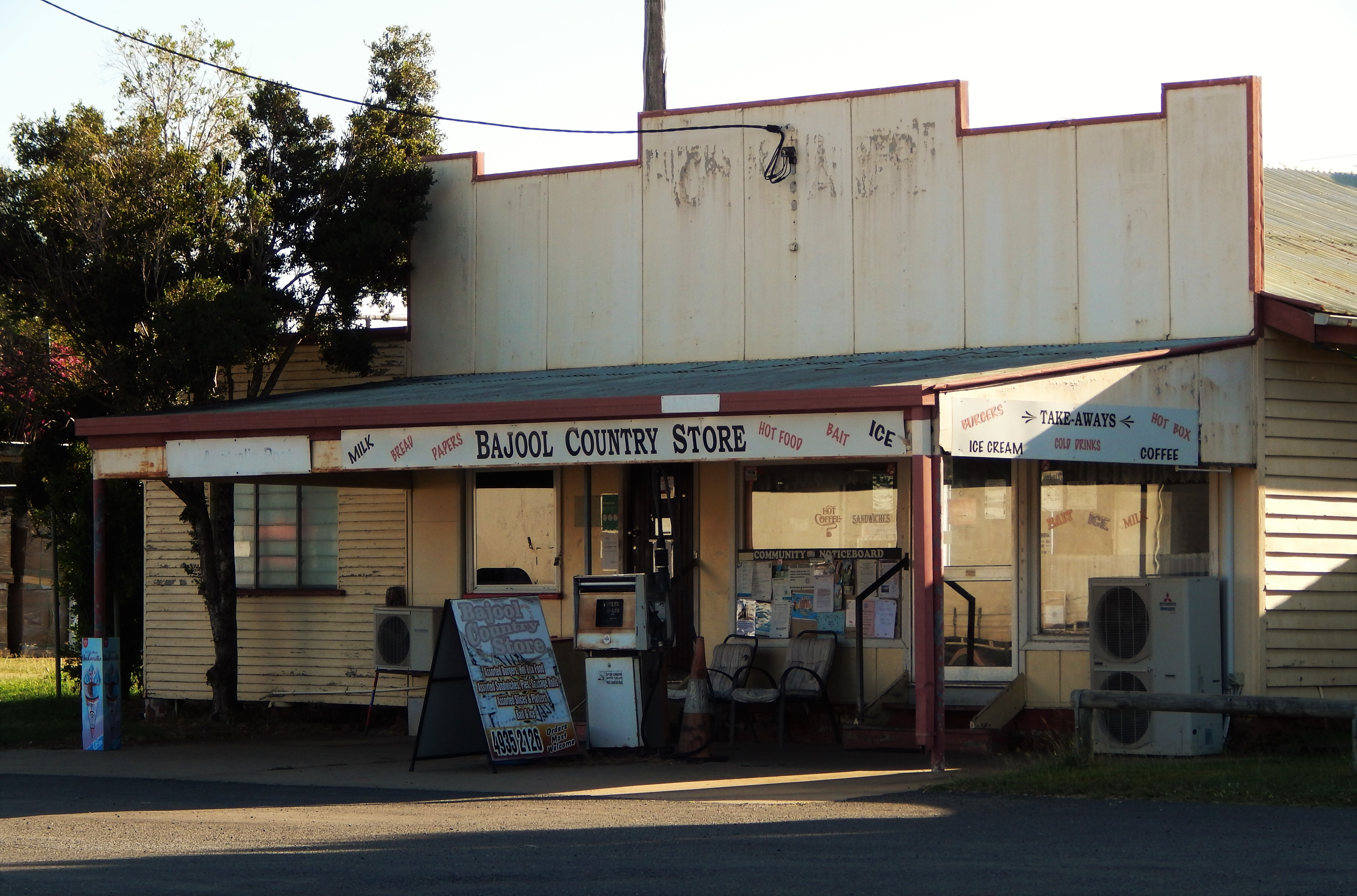
Bajool Country Store, 2022
