= Langmorn Homestead =

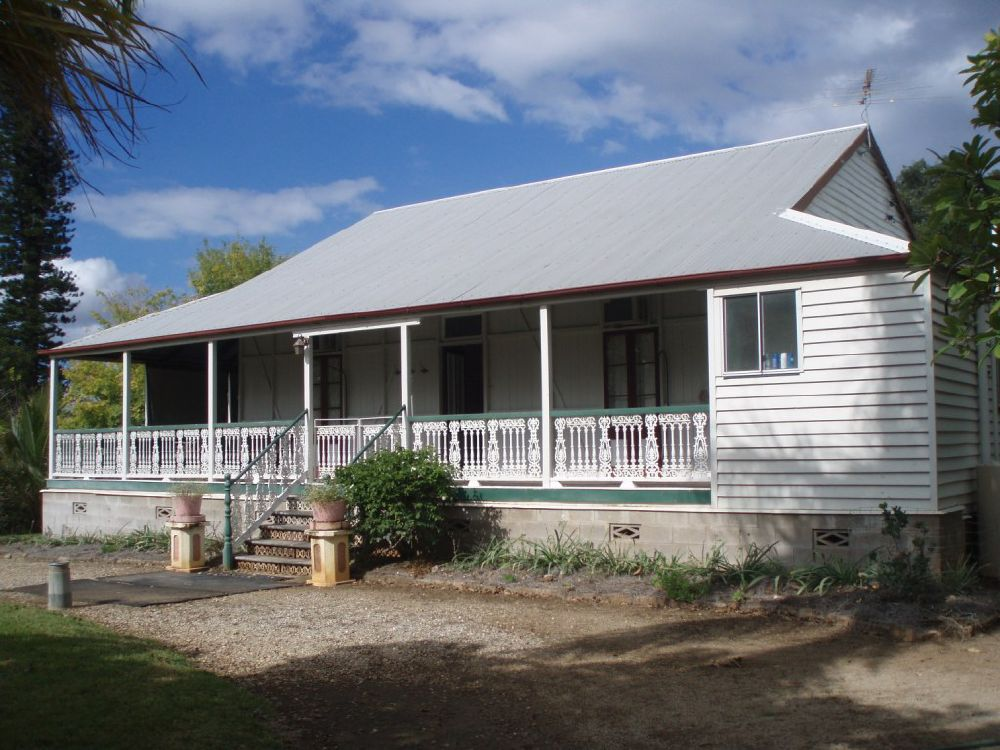
- Langmorn Homestead, 2009

- Location within Queensland Location within Australia
- 23.8352°S 150.7544°E
- Location: Langmorn Road, Raglan, Gladstone Region, Queensland, Australia

History
- Design period: 1870s - 1890s (late 19th century)
- Built: 1873 - 1926

Queensland Heritage Register
- Official name: Langmorn Homestead
- Type: state heritage (built, archaeological)
- Designated: 21 October 1992
- Reference no.: 600387
- Significant period: 1870s (historical); 1870s-1920s (fabric)
- Significant components: stables, trees/plantings, graveyard, out building/s, residential accommodation - main house, grave marker, fencing

Langmorn Homestead is a heritage-listed homestead at Langmorn Road, Raglan, Gladstone Region, Queensland, Australia. It was built from 1873 to 1926. It was added to the Queensland Heritage Register on 21 October 1992.

== History ==
Langmorn Homestead is the residence and associated outbuildings of a pastoral property located in the Port Curtis Hinterland and was established in 1869 by Thomas Creed and his family.

The region in which Langmorn is located was first explored by Charles and William Archer in 1853. Two years later, William Landsborough also explored the region, taking up the run of Raglan in the same year. It was managed by Landsborough’s sons, James and John, with James occupying the property with his family. By 1862, he had acquired sole ownership of Raglan which then comprised 200 square miles on which sheep were run. By 1865, Raglan had been sold and passed wholly into the ownership of the Bank of New South Wales by 1868. In this year the Crown Land Alienation Act was passed which enabled the Government to resume half the area of large runs to permit closer settlement. The Bank consolidated the property in 1869, selling the south western portion to brothers Thomas and George Creed. They named the new property Langmorn and operated it as a cattle run. From accounts in Thomas Creed's diaries, there appears to have been a continuing relationship between the two properties, with landmarks on Raglan also being used by Langmorn as meeting and resting points.

Thomas Creed first arrived in Australia from England in 1853. He unsuccessfully prospected for gold at Ballarat, later entering a partnership in the farming industry. In 1857 he returned to England, where he married Edith Allen. The new Mrs Creed's parents had left her a property in Jamaica which the Creeds took over in 1859. However, in 1868 they returned to England and then sailed for Brisbane with their two small sons, arriving in Moreton Bay on 23 January 1869. When George Creed arrived by a later boat, the brothers travelled north in October to inspect Langmorn Station before purchase. On 14 December 1869, the family moved to Langmorn.

At first the Creeds lived in an existing house, presumably built for Raglan, but in May 1873 a homestead was constructed for them by a Mr Pershouse. In 1877 this was substantially enlarged by William Semfel with assistance from station workers. Timber for the construction and additions to the homestead was cut on the property, although pine planks were ordered for the later work from the Calliope Sawmill.

The area of Langmorn's land was substantially reduced during the late 19th century due to resumptions in relation to the various Land Acts of the period. In 1905 the residence was enlarged by building a new timber structure adjacent to the old; the space where the verandahs of the two abutted becoming an open living area. The addition had four rooms and provided a new formal entrance for the house. This effectively reorientated the residence because the new entrance faced north, while the front of the first house looked east. In 1910 Thomas and George Creed secured ownership of the homestead block at auction. Thomas Creed died at Langmorn in 1911, at the age of 85. Four of his five sons remained on the property, dividing it into four parts, each with its own homestead. The additional three homesteads being named Prior Park, Cecilwood and Cleveden.

Further work continued on the Langmorn homestead building until 1917, when the verandahs were partially enclosed. A large concrete stable building was constructed in 1926.

The current owners, members of the Creed family, have owned the property since 1998. The buildings are very intact and new sheds on the site have been constructed using bush pole frames and corrugated iron roofs in a similar manner to the original buildings. New work has been dated, continuing a family tradition begun in 1873.

== Description ==
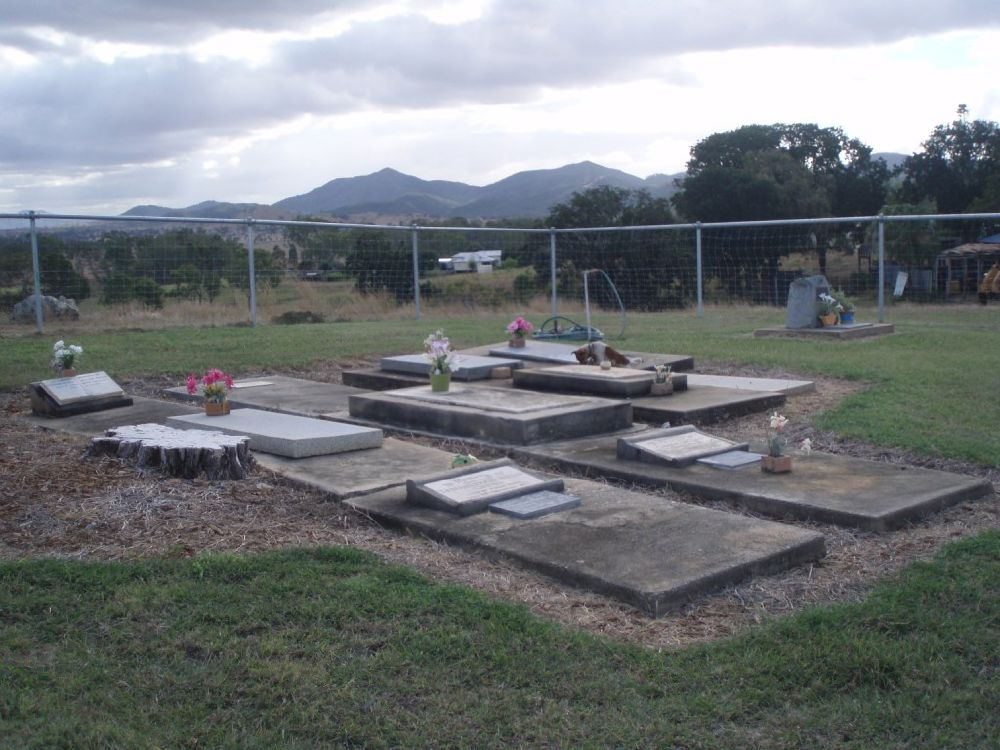
Graveyard, 2009

The Langmorn homestead complex is sited on a hill and can be seen from a distance because the specimen trees around the homestead and along the drive serve as visual markers. The complex comprises the main house, cottage, a number of outbuildings, a family graveyard and mature plantings.

The residence consists of a rectangular 1870s building looking north east with a 1900s extension adjoining it on the north west. This later structure provides a formal front entrance to the house and is approached by a circular drive around a lawn with trees and a rockery fountain. It is constructed of timber with exposed studs. The gambrel roof is clad with corrugated iron. The verandah to the front and north eastern side has balustrading formed of cast iron panels, that on the south west has been built in to create a bedroom, bathroom and toilet. The central entrance opens on to a hall from which bedrooms open out on either side. To the rear there is a third bedroom and a library.

A large open area is formed between the two buildings which comprise the residence where their roofs touch. This building has a hipped roof clad originally with shingles which can still be seen under the roofing iron. The core structure of the earlier building is timber with exposed studs. It comprises three main rooms and has French lights opening onto a verandah which surrounds it. This is now enclosed and has small rooms to what was formerly the rear. The section along the former is built in with fibrous cement panels in the lower section with windows in metal frames above. Kitchen cabinets have been built into the south east corner of the verandah. The post at this corner is carved with the inscription "TC GC 1873". That on the northern corner is similarly carved with "T Creed 1877".

Behind the main building is a courtyard area which has a small slab building, formerly a staff bathroom, now used as a toilet for visitors. There is a weatherboard clad cottage to the south of the main building. It is set on low stumps, has a gabled roof with new metal cladding and has verandahs all round, sections at the front having been built in. It has 12 pane windows and the interior walls are to partition height only. It is currently used as a souvenir shop.

There is an L-shaped concrete stable building behind the house which is marked with the date "1926." It has a hipped, metal clad roof and large timber doors. The walls are rough cast and have metal framed multiple-panel windows set within moulded concrete surrounds. Situated to the west of the stables is a small building constructed of timber slabs on a pole frame with a gabled roof. This is believed to be the oldest building on the site.

To the south-east of the stables and behind a large modern vehicle shed is a small timber building which the family believe to have been the original homestead. This has a frame clad with weatherboards and a gabled roof extended out to form a verandah supported on timber posts. The interior is divided into two by a partition extending only to wall height.

Situated on a rise to the south of the homestead is the family graveyard. It the highest point in the complex and commands a fine view across the valley. The earliest burial is that of Edith Augusta Creed, who died on 21 May 1873 aged 1 year and 8 months. It also contains the burials of several generations of the Creed family, including those of Thomas (1826–1911) and Edith Creed (1838–1881) Creed. The memorials are inscribed slabs and the area is encircled by a timber fence with a pair of metal gates.

== Heritage listing ==
Langmorn Homestead was listed on the Queensland Heritage Register on 21 October 1992 having satisfied the following criteria.

The place is important in demonstrating the evolution or pattern of Queensland's history.

Langmorn homestead illustrates the pattern of early European exploration and settlement of Queensland where the development of pastoral properties preceded agriculture and the establishment of towns. As an early homestead in central Queensland which has remained in continuous use, it has important associations with the development of the pastoral industry in Queensland.

The place demonstrates rare, uncommon or endangered aspects of Queensland's cultural heritage.

Because Langmorn has continued in the ownership of one family and is well documented, the homestead complex provides an uncommonly good and intact record of an evolving pastoral property established in the mid 19th century.

The place has potential to yield information that will contribute to an understanding of Queensland's history.

Due to its age and intact nature, Langmorn has the potential to yield information on the way in which such properties were run and evidence for the building techniques used over several generations, thus contributing to an understanding of Queensland's history.

The place is important in demonstrating the principal characteristics of a particular class of cultural places.

It is a demonstrates the principal characteristics of a 19th-century homestead well, including the residential buildings, associated outbuildings, graves, fences and mature trees.

The place is important because of its aesthetic significance.

The homestead complex contains structures which are well designed and made examples of traditional buildings which are pleasing in form, materials and detail and mature trees which contribute visually to the setting and provide a landmark in the area.

The place has a special association with the life or work of a particular person, group or organisation of importance in Queensland's history.

Langmorn homestead has a special association with the life and work of the Creed family, who, as early pastoralists contributed to the development of the area.
