= Beejapore (1851) =

History

United Kingdom
- Name: Beejapore
- Namesake: Beejapore, India
- Owner: Willis & Company
- Launched: 1851
- Identification: Official Number: 24022
- Fate: Lost 1863

General characteristics
- Class & type: Full-rigged ship

The Beejapore was a 1,676 ton full-rigged clipper built at Saint John, New Brunswick in 1851.

== Construction and design ==
She and her sister ship Marco Polo measured 184 feet (56 meters) in length, with a beam of 36 feet (11 meters), and draught of 29 feet (8.8 meters). She displaced 1,676 tons and had three decks.

== Emigrant ship ==
Under the command of John L. McLay, Beejapore departed England in 1851 arriving in New York City on 19 November 1851. Transporting passengers she left Liverpool on 12 October 1852 and arrived in Port Jackson, Australia on 6 January 1853, with the ship being placed in quarantine due to an outbreak of measles on board. During the voyage 56 emigrants were buried at sea - 55 of them children or infants. She left Port Jackson on 18 March and headed for Callao, Peru.

She made another voyage in 1857 to Sydney and another in 1863 to Keppel Bay near Yeppoon and Moreton Bay near Brisbane in Queensland.

== Fate ==
While on the 1863 voyage from Keppel Bay to Callao she was lost.
