= Keppel Bay =

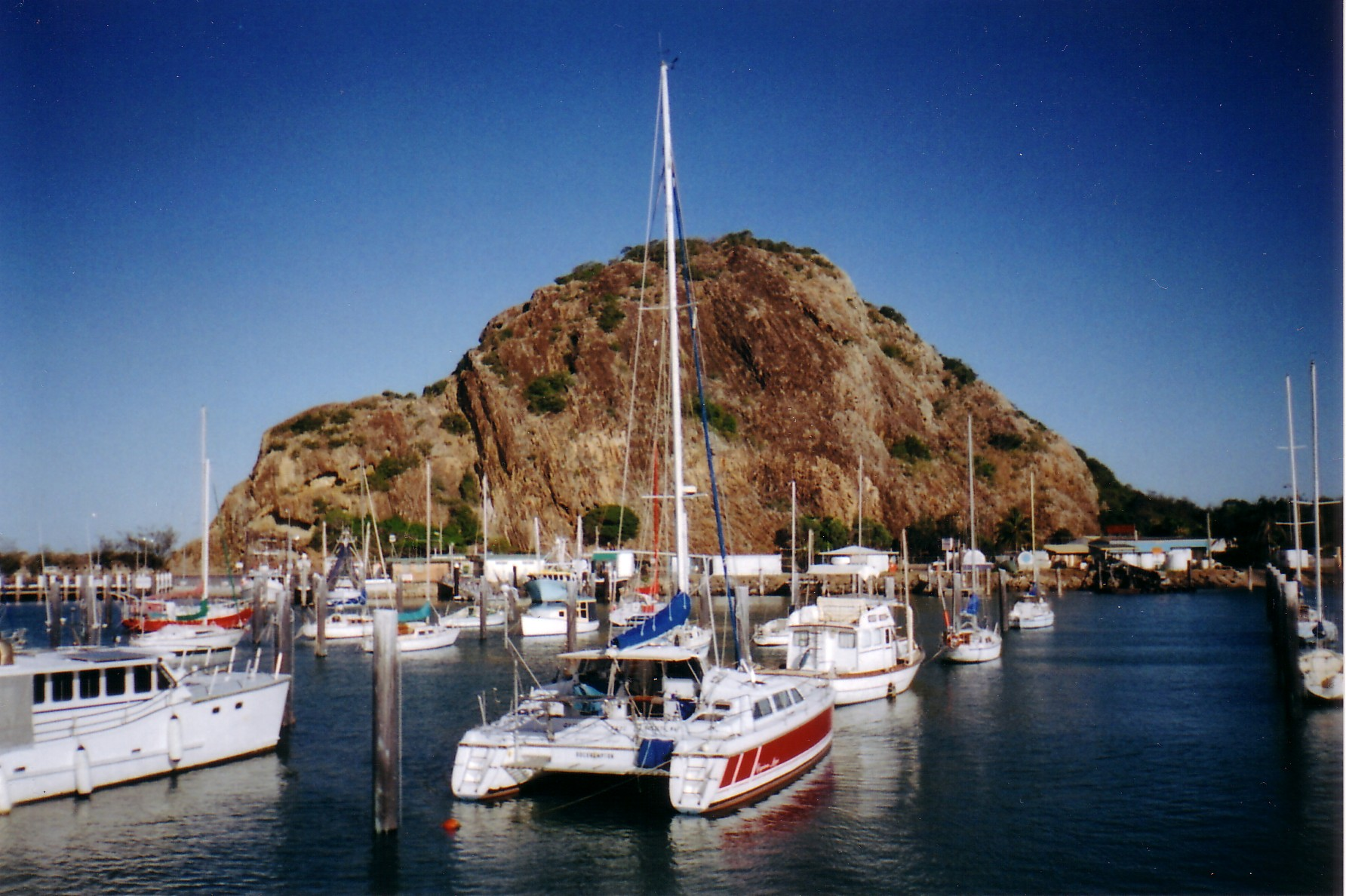
- Boats anchored at Rosslyn Bay Harbour, on Keppel Bay

- Location within Queensland
- Location: Central Queensland
- Coordinates: 23.389°S 150.898°E
- River sources: Fitzroy River
- Ocean/sea sources: Coral Sea
- Basin countries: Australia

Keppel Bay is a bay in Central Queensland, Australia, at the mouth of the Fitzroy River on the coast of the Coral Sea.

== Extent ==
Keppel Bay extends from Station Point on Curtis Island (23.4500°S 151.0167°E) in the Gladstone Region to Zilzie Point at Zilzie (23.2797°S 150.8247°E) in the Shire of Livingstone.

== Islands ==
The named islands in Keppel Bay from north to south are:

- Round Rock off Zilzie (23.2990°S 150.8321°E)
- Flat Rock off Coorooman (23.3142°S 150.8489°E)
- Girt Island off Keppel Sands / Joskleigh (23.3561°S 150.8137°E)
- Shelly Knob off Curtis Island (23.5005°S 150.9869°E)
- Satellite Island in the Fitzroy River mouth off Port Alma (23.5075°S 150.7136°E)
- Mackenzie Island in the Fitzroy River mouth off Thompson Point (23.5108°S 150.8641°E)
- Egg Island in the Fitzroy River mouth off Thompson Point (23.5219°S 150.8306°E)
- Mud Island in the Fitzroy River mouth off Thompson Point (23.5266°S 150.8516°E)
- Balaclava Island in the Fitzroy River mouth off The Narrows (23.5836°S 150.9230°E)

Despite the name, the islands in Keppel Bay Islands National Park are not within Keppel Bay but are to the north and east of the bay.

== History ==
Keppel Bay was named by Captain Cook when he was there on 27 May 1770, after Admiral Augustus Keppel of the British Royal Navy.

== View ==
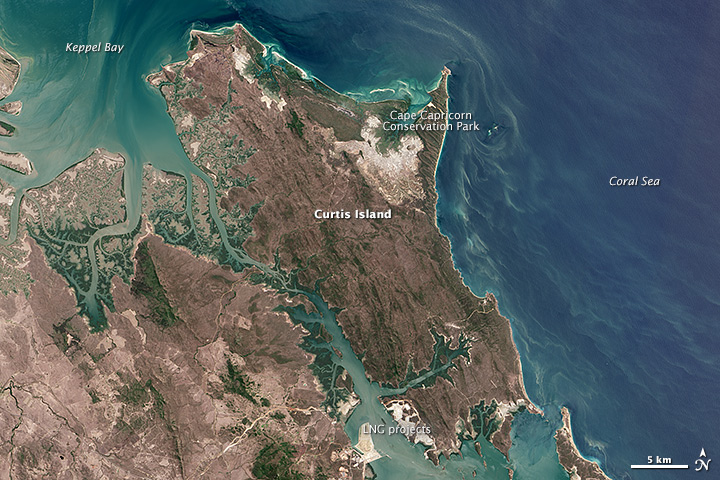
Keppel Bay & Curtis Island

== See also ==
- Great Keppel Island
- Cape Manifold
- Pumpkin Island
