= Mount Scoria Conservation Park =

Protected area in Queensland, Australia

Coordinates: 24°31′58″S 150°36′01″E

Mount Scoria Conservation Park is a park near Thangool, Queensland in Central Queensland, Australia, about 17 kilometres (11 mi) south-east of Biloela. It is within the traditional lands of the Gangulu aboriginal people. It features Mount Scoria, a mountain whose peak is about 150 metres (490 ft) above the surrounding plains. The mountain was once an active volcano, approximately 20 to 26 million years ago.

It features unusual and impressive basalt columns, the same type which make up the Giant's Causeway, Ireland. As the volcano's lava cooled, it formed distinct columns or pillars with five to eight sides, called columnar basalt. When hit on the tops with a hammer, the columns make musical notes of varying pitch.

Activities conducted in the park include animal and birdwatching as well as bushwalking.

== See also ==
- Protected areas of Queensland
- List of places with columnar basalt
