= Rawbelle, Queensland =

Rawbelle
- Suburb
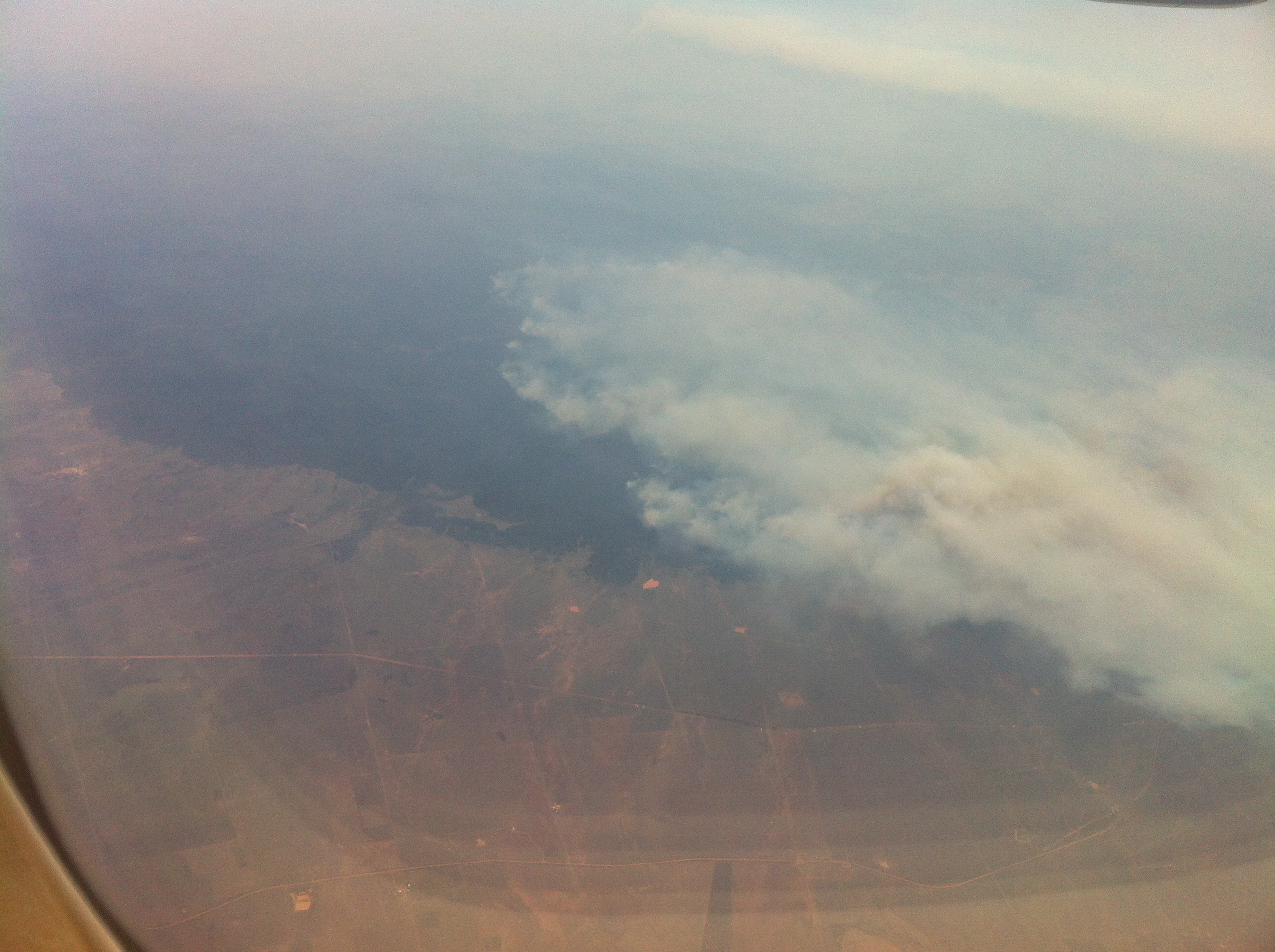
- Aerial view of a bushfre at Rawbelle

- Interactive map of Rawbelle
- Coordinates: 24.9747°S 150.7316°E
- Country: Australia
- State: Queensland
- LGA: North Burnett Region
- Location: 72.6 km (45.1 mi) W of Monto; 81.1 km (50.4 mi) S of Biloela; 202 km (126 mi) SW of Gladstone; 203 km (126 mi) NW of Gayndah; 547 km (340 mi) NNW of Brisbane

Government
  - State electorate: Callide
  - Federal division: Flynn

Area
  - Total: 962.5 km^{2} (371.6 sq mi)

Population
  - Total: 51 (2021 census)
  - Density: 0.0530/km^{2} (0.1372/sq mi)
- Time zone: UTC+10:00 (AEST)
- Postcode: 4630
Suburbs around Rawbelle
Camboon	Harrami	Coominglah
Camboon	Rawbelle	Coominglah Forest
Eidsvold West	Eidsvold West	Wuruma Dam

Rawbelle is a rural locality in the North Burnett Region, Queensland, Australia. In the 2021 census, Rawbelle had a population of 51 people.

== Geography ==
Rawbelle has the following mountains:

- Mount Clairvoyant (25.0128°S 150.6333°E) 454 metres (1,490 ft)
- Mount Runsome (25.0392°S 150.6535°E) 454 metres (1,490 ft)
- Red Mountain (25.0184°S 150.7242°E) 447 metres (1,467 ft)
- The Pinnacle (25.0285°S 150.6895°E) 401 metres (1,316 ft)

There are a number of protected areas in the locality:

- two sections of the Montour State Forest in the north-west of the locality, which extend into neighbouring Camboon
- Trevethan State Forest in the south-west of the locality which extends into neighbouring Eidsvold West
- Hefferon State Forest in the south of the locality

Apart from these protected areas, the land use is grazing on native vegetation.

== History ==
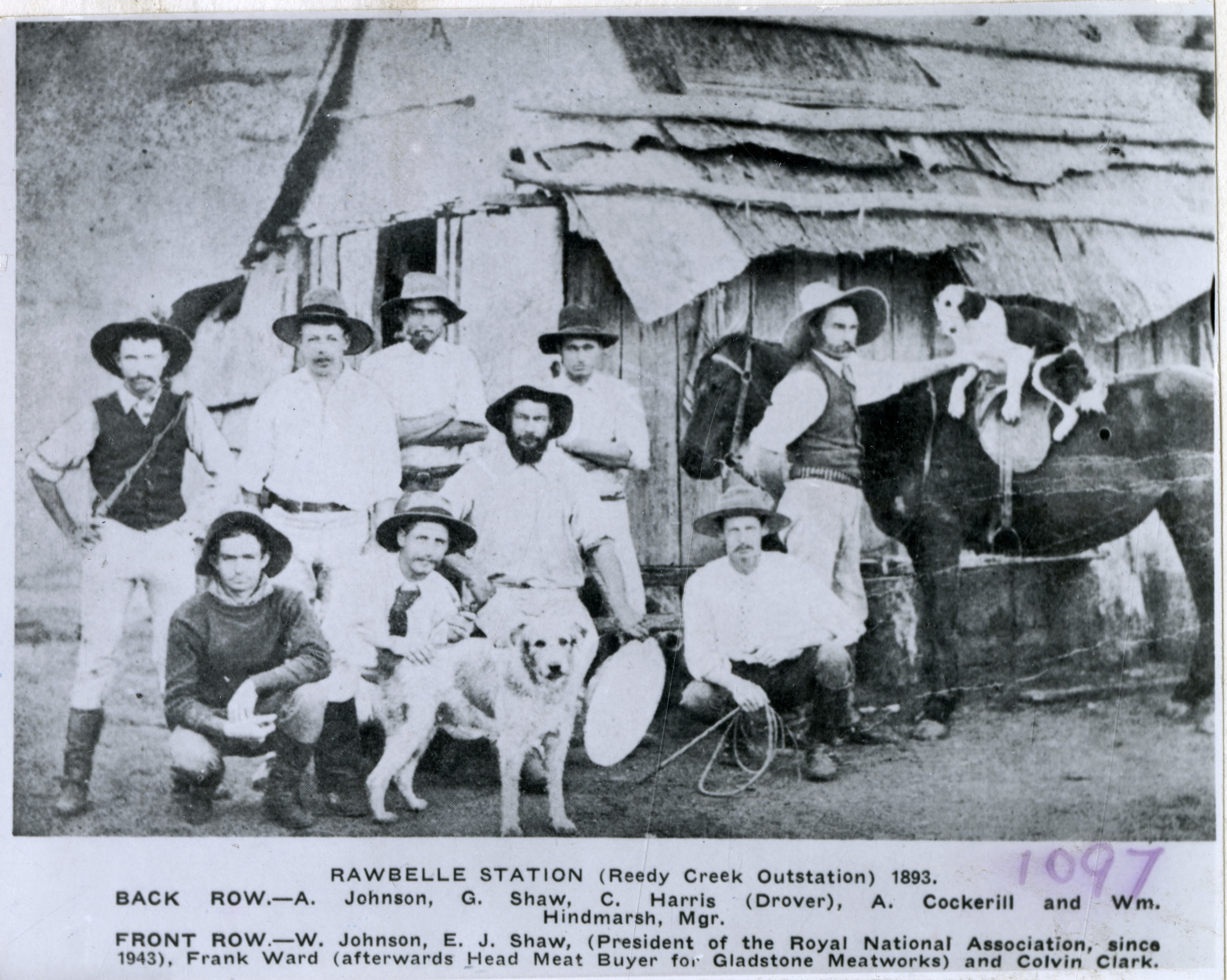
Reedy Creek outstation on Rawbelle pastoral station, 1893

Rawbelle pastoral station was established by Adolphus Henry Trevethan in 1848 with the homestead on the southern bank of the Nogo River, now marked by a date palm and a plaque. In March 1852, Trevethan was killed by local Aboriginal people. The homestead site was moved further north in 1890. The land of Rawbelle station was reduced by the Upper Burnett and Callide Valley Land Settlement Scheme in 1923, which encourages closer settlement. A town site called Rawbelle was surveyed in 1872 close to the original homestead site.

== Demographics ==
In the 2016 census, Rawbelle had a population of 56 people.

In the 2021 census, Rawbelle had a population of 51 people.

== Heritage listings ==
Rawbelle has a number of heritage-listed sites, including:

- Rawbelle Cemetery and Homestead Site, off Old Rawbelle Road

== Education ==
There are no schools in Rawbelle. The nearest government primary schools are Thangool State School in Thangool to the north, Monto State School in Monto to the north-east, and Abercorn State School in Abercorn to the south-east.The nearest government secondary school is Monto State High School, also in Monto. However, for students in the south-western parts of Rawbelle, the distances to these primary and secondary schools would be too far for a daily commute; the alternatives are distance education and boarding school.
