= Biloela railway station =

Former railway station in Queensland, Australia

Biloela
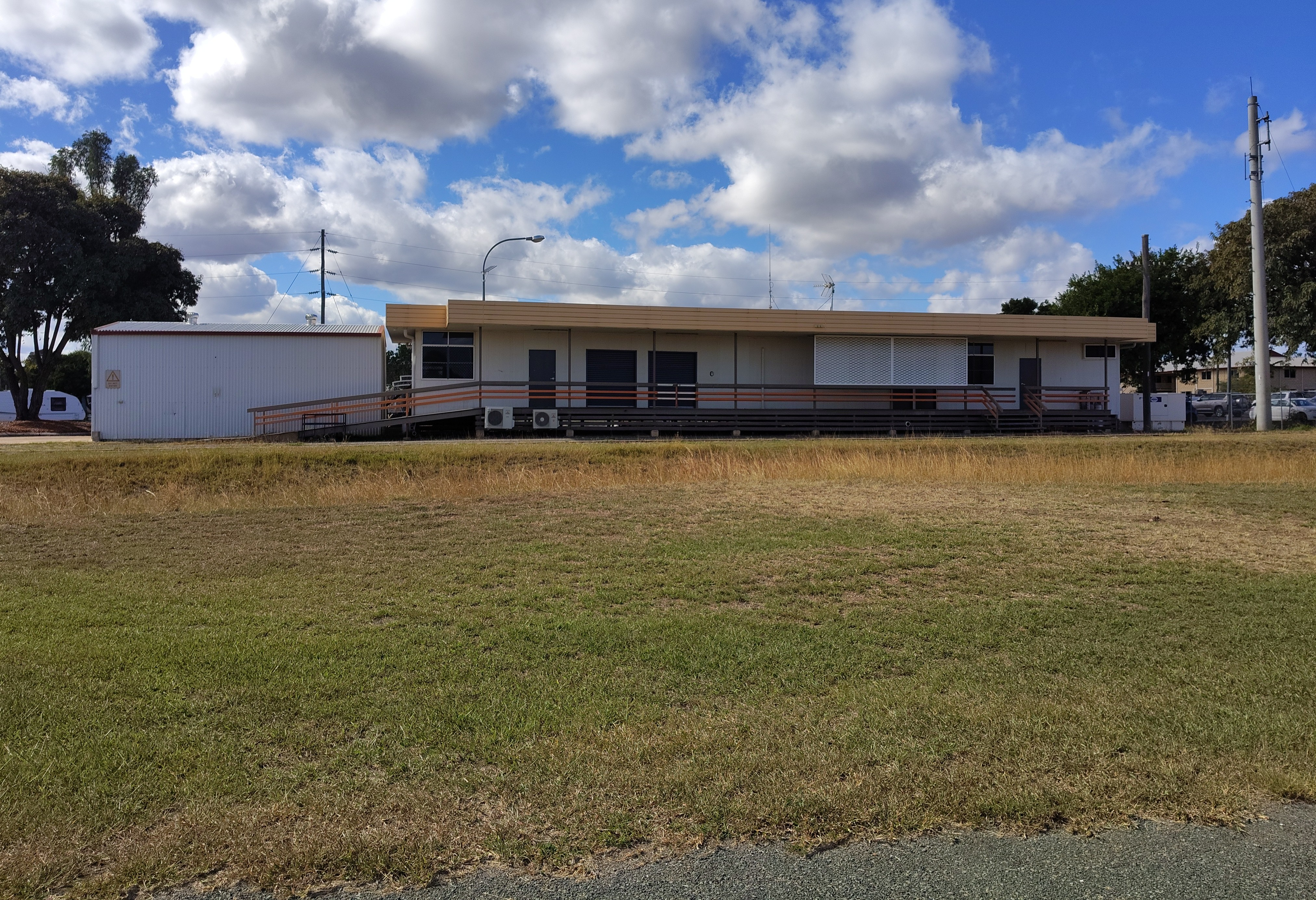
- Former station building in June 2026

General information
- Location: 97 Callide Street, Biloela
- Coordinates: 24.39949°S 150.50867°E
- Owner: Queensland Rail
- Operator: Queensland Rail
- Platforms: 1

Other information
- Status: Closed

History
- Opened: 24 August 1925; 100 years ago
- Closed: 30 June 2013; 13 years ago
Location

Biloela was a railway station operated by Queensland Rail on the Callide Valley line. It opened in 1925 and served the Central Queensland town of Biloela until its closure in 2013. It was a ground level station, featuring one side platform. Although it was mainly used for freight, the station was used for passengers services when the line was at its peak.

== History ==
Biloela station opened on 24 August 1925 as part of the extension of the Callide Valley railway line (which opened one year prior) from Callide to Thangool. The station included a goods yard and contained a number of sidings, including several that were opened in the years following the station's opening. In 1933, the Railway Department named Biloela as having one of the most beautiful railway station gardens in Queensland.

Beginning in the 1970s, Lindsay Hartwig, who represented the electorate of Callide – which includes Biloela – in the Queensland Legislative Assembly as a member of the National Party (and later as an independent), repeatedly raised the issue of the state of the wooden station building. Hartwig described it as a "damned disgrace to the department" and said "the station master's office would not even make a good chicken coop". Then-transport minister Keith Hooper told Hartwig in 1976 that "the existing facilities adequately meet requirements" and it was "not practicable to entertain the request" of a new building because of limited financial resources.

After his appointment in 1977 as transport minister, Ken Tomkins visited Biloela with Hartwig to announce that approval had been granted for the provision of a new station building; Tomkins said in May 1979 that he was "hopeful that the work will be carried out in [the 1979–80 financial year]". Two years later, no construction had begun, with Hartwig saying in November 1981 that "prisoners at Etna Creek live in better conditions than the railway workers of Queensland" and the station remained in "shameful condition".

New transport minister Don Lane stated in March 1982 that it had it was not yet "practicable" to fund the construction, but later that year, he told Hartwig that it was "first on the list of priorities for station buildings to be reconstructed in [Central Queensland] when funds are available". Construction of the new building eventually began in 1983 and was completed in 1984.

Following the closure of the line to Thangool in January 1988, Biloela became the line's terminus; around this point, it was a 7.7-kilometre (4.8 mi) branch from Dakenba. In the 1990s, the Queensland Government threatened to close the line to Biloela because it was considered unviable; the line remained after several local businesses committed to using it for freight.

In May 2009, Queensland Rail (QR) confirmed it was considering the future of freight rail services to Biloela, which had been losing more than A$1 million annually. In mid-2010, the twice-weekly Seafreighter rail service from Biloela to the Port of Brisbane was replaced with heavy trucks.

=== Closure ===
On 30 June 2013, the railway line from Dakenba to Biloela was closed, effectively closing the station.

In December 2016, it was announced that the State Emergency Service (SES) facility in Biloela would be relocated from its shed adjacent to the Biloela fire station to the railway station building. The project received A$300,000 in funding from the Queensland Government at a total cost of A$409,000. It officially opened on 14 March 2018.
