= Coominglah, Queensland =

Coominglah
- Suburb
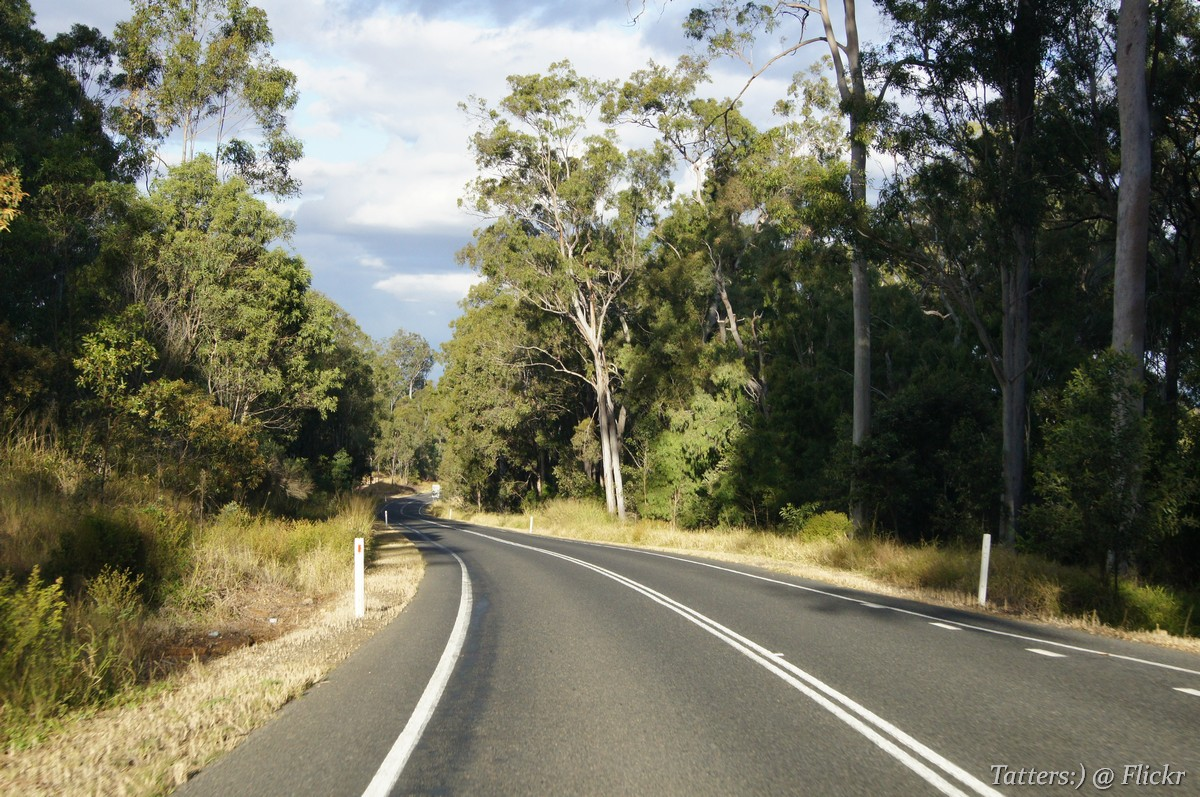
- Burnett Highway, Coominglah, 2011

- Interactive map of Coominglah
- Coordinates: 24.7705°S 150.8538°E
- Country: Australia
- State: Queensland
- LGA: North Burnett Region
- Location: 32.5 km (20.2 mi) NW of Monto; 156 km (97 mi) NW of Gayndah; 183 km (114 mi) SW of Gladstone; 204 km (127 mi) SW of Rockhampton; 507 km (315 mi) NNW of Brisbane

Government
  - State electorate: Callide
  - Federal division: Flynn

Area
  - Total: 204.5 km^{2} (79.0 sq mi)

Population
  - Total: 12 (2021 census)
  - Density: 0.0587/km^{2} (0.152/sq mi)
- Time zone: UTC+10:00 (AEST)
- Postcode: 4630
Suburbs around Coominglah
Lawgi Dawes	Lawgi Dawes	Cania
Harrami	Coominglah	Coominglah Forest
Harrami	Rawbelle	Coominglah Forest

Coominglah is a rural locality in the North Burnett Region, Queensland, Australia. The land use is grazing on native vegetation. In the 2021 census, Coominglah had a population of 12 people.

== Geography ==
The Coominglah Range forms the north-eastern boundary of the locality.

Coominglah has the following mountains:

- Mount Margaret (24.8280°S 150.8983°E) 605 metres (1,985 ft)
- The Knob (24.7311°S 150.8130°E) 441 metres (1,447 ft)

The Burnett Highway enters the locality from the north (Lawgi Dawes) and exits to the east (Coominglah Forest).

The land use is grazing on native vegetation.

== History ==
Coominglah was one of four pastoral runs selected by Adolphus Henry Trevethan in July 1848 following advice from the Archer brothers. It had an estimated area of 20,480 acres (8,290 ha; 82.9 km^{2}) and an estimated grazing capacity of 4000 sheep.

Coominglah State School opened circa December 1939 with teacher Miss Viola Petra Goodfellow. It closed circa 1947. It was on Burns Road (24.70892°S 150.81085°E), now within the boundaries of neighbouring Lawgi Dawes.

== Demographics ==
In the 2016 census, Coominglah had a population of 18 people.

In the 2021 census, Coominglah had a population of 12 people.

== Education ==
There are no schools in Coominglah. The nearest government primary schools are Monto State School in Monto to the south-east and Thangool State School in Thangool to the north-west. The nearest government secondary school is Monto State High School in Monto.
