= Lawgi Dawes =

- Suburb
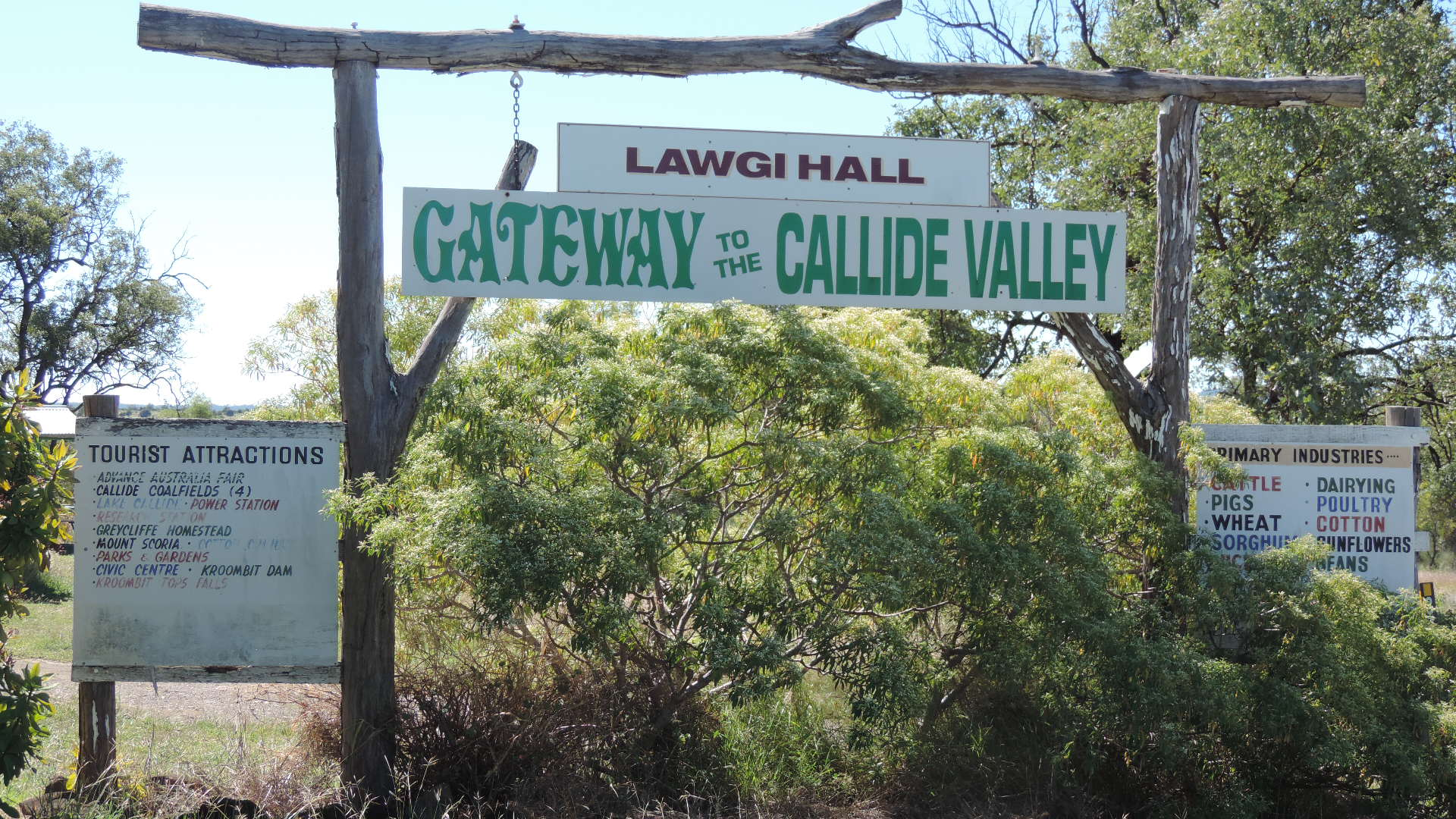
- Sign outside Lawgi Hall, 2014

- Interactive map of Lawgi Dawes
- Coordinates: 24.59°S 150.7619°E
- Country: Australia
- State: Queensland
- LGA: Shire of Banana
- Location: 30.1 km (18.7 mi) SE of Biloela; 73.2 km (45.5 mi) NW of Monto; 150 km (93 mi) SW of Gladstone; 172 km (107 mi) S of Rockhampton; 536 km (333 mi) NNW of Brisbane

Government
  - State electorate: Callide
  - Federal division: Flynn

Area
  - Total: 571.5 km^{2} (220.7 sq mi)

Population
  - Total: 138 (2021 census)
  - Density: 0.2415/km^{2} (0.6254/sq mi)
- Time zone: UTC+10:00 (AEST)
- Postcode: 4716
Suburbs around Lawgi Dawes
Thangool	Valentine Plains	Valentine Plains
Thangool	Lawgi Dawes	Cania
Harrami	Coominglah	Coominglah

Lawgi Dawes is a rural locality in the Shire of Banana, Queensland, Australia. It contains the neighbourhood of Lawgi, a former town. In the 2021 census, Lawgi Dawes had a population of 138 people.

== Geography ==
Lawgi is an abandoned neighbourhood (24.5666°S 150.65°E) within the locality. It is located on the Burnett Highway.

Mardale is a neighbourhood (24.55°S 150.7°E). It is located on Blackmans Yard Road.

The area is a productive agricultural area with cattle and grain farming predominating.

== History ==
During the planning to build the Rannes-Monto railway line, one of the proposed railway stations along the route was assigned the name Lawgi by the Railways Department in 1926. The name is believed to mean home in one of the Aboriginal languages.

Dawes State School opened on 20 June 1932 and closed in October 1932. It was located near the proposed Dawes railway station at the intersection of the Burnett Highway and Blackmans Yard Road (approx 24.6473°S 150.7477°E).

Construction of the railway line commenced from Rannes. On Saturday 24 September 1932, the segment from Thangool to Lawgi was officially opened by the Minister for Railways, John Dash (the Member of the Queensland Legislative Assembly for Mundingburra). This resulted in the establishment of the township of Lawgi.

Yaparaba State School opened on 30 August 1934 and closed on 6 February 1970. It was located on a bend in Yaparaba School Road (approx 24.63521°S 150.70782°E) to the immediate south of the never-constructed Yaparaba railway station on the never-constructed section of the railway line.

Lawgi State School opened in September 1935. It was renamed Mardale State School in 1952. The school closed on 13 March 1964. It was on Lawgi Connection Road (24.5709°S 150.6441°E).

Coominglah State School opened circa December 1939 with teacher Miss Viola Petra Goodfellow. It closed circa 1947. It was on Burns Road (24.70892°S 150.81085°E) just on the border with Coominglah.

The last section of the railway line from Lawgi to Monto was never completed, and Lawgi became the terminus. However, the railway line was not profitable and the section from Thangool to Lawgi was closed in 1955. As a result, the township gradually disappeared leaving only the community hall.

In 2003, local artists Gary Latcham and Jo Lawrence painted the exterior of the hall with the silhouettes of bottle trees against a sunset.

In 2019, a decision was made to put cladding on the hall, covering the artwork. Gary Latcham assisted by local volunteer artists repainted the artwork.

== Demographics ==
In the 2016 census, Lawgi Dawes had a population of 144 people.

In the 2021 census, Lawgi Dawes had a population of 138 people.

== Amenities ==
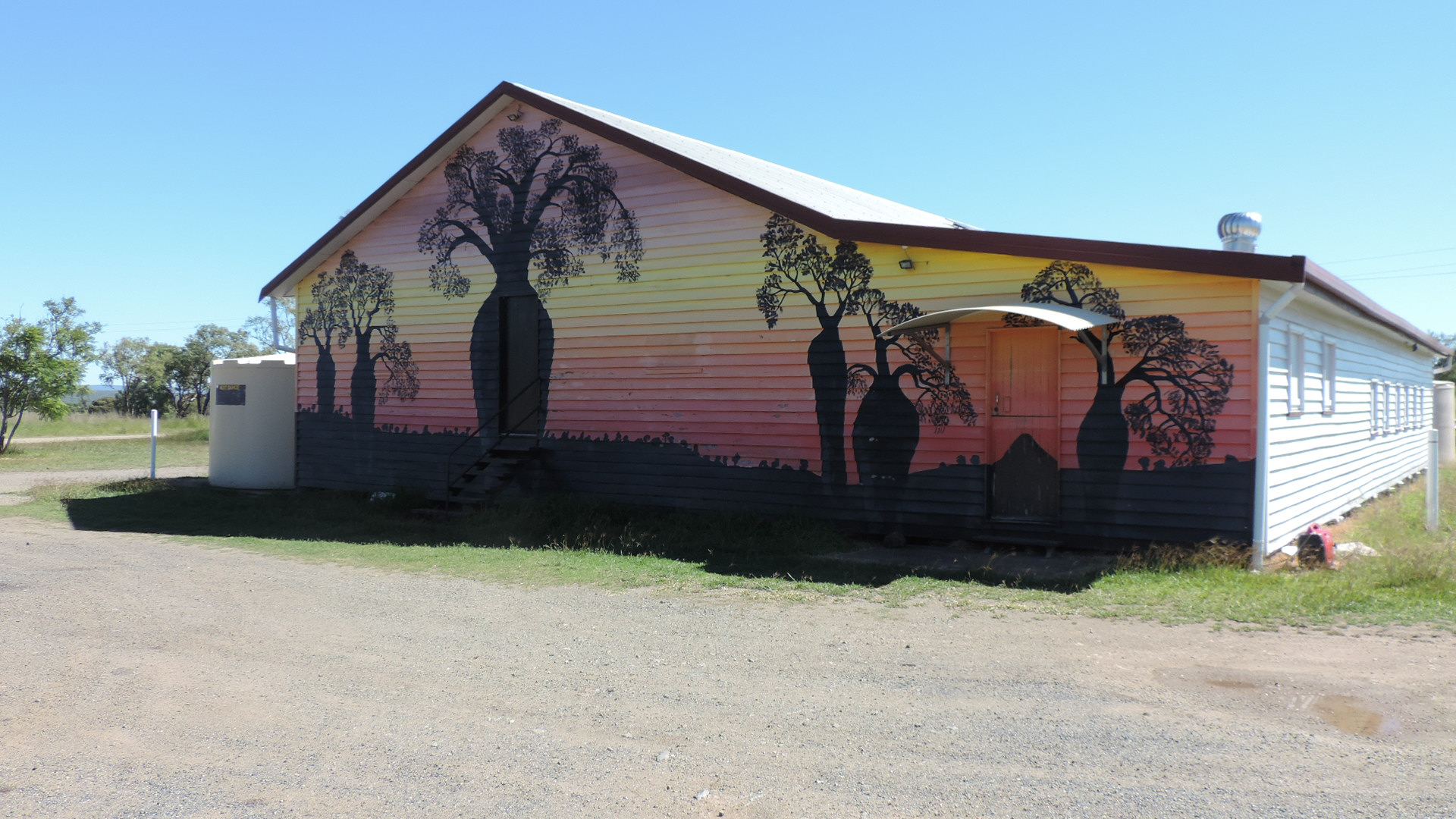
Lawgi Hall painted with bottle trees, 2014

Lawgi Community Hall at the intersection of the Burnett Highway and the Lawgi Connection Road is used for regular community dances, occasional church services, indoor bowls, polling booth and other community functions. The exterior of the hall features a painting of bottle brushes trees against a multi-coloured sky.

A memorial in the form of a gravestone marks the point where the proposed Rannes-Monto railway line was terminated at Lawgi. There is a rest area behind the hall for travellers.

== Education ==
There are no schools in Lawgi Dawes. The nearest government primary school is Thangool State School in neighbouring Thangool to the north-west. The nearest government secondary schools are Biloela State High School in Biloela to the north-west and Monto State High School in Monto to the south-east.
