= Greycliffe =

Greycliffe may refer to:

- Greycliffe, the harbour ferry involved in the Greycliffe disaster, an accident in Sydney, Australia
- Greycliffe House, an historic dwelling situated in the Sydney suburb of Vaucluse
- Greycliffe Homestead, a heritage-listed homestead in Biloela, Queensland, Australia
- Greycliffe, Queensland, a locality in the Shire of Banana, Queensland, Australia

== See also ==
- Graycliff, an estate designed by Frank Lloyd Wright, on the United States National Register of Historic Places
- Greycliff, Montana, United States, a census-designated place
