= Harrami =

- Suburb
- Interactive map of Harrami
- Coordinates: 24.7816°S 150.6955°E
- Country: Australia
- State: Queensland
- LGA: North Burnett Region
- Location: 43.2 km (26.8 mi) WSW of Monto; 56.1 km (34.9 mi) SSE of Biloela; 177 km (110 mi) SW of Gladstone; 199 km (124 mi) NW of Gayndah; 526 km (327 mi) NNW of Brisbane

Government
  - State electorate: Callide
  - Federal division: Flynn

Area
  - Total: 314.4 km^{2} (121.4 sq mi)

Population
  - Total: 22 (2021 census)
  - Density: 0.0700/km^{2} (0.181/sq mi)
- Time zone: UTC+10:00 (AEST)
- Postcode: 4630
Suburbs around Harrami
Thangool	Lawgi Dawes	Lawgi Dawes
Camboon	Harrami	Coominglah
Rawbelle	Rawbelle	Rawbelle

Harrami is a rural locality in the North Burnett Region, Queensland, Australia. In the 2021 census, Harrami had a population of 22 people.

== Geography ==
The locality is bounded to the north by the Dawes Range. The land use is almost entirely grazing on native vegetation.

The locality contains the following mountains:

- Mount Hindmarsh (24.7949°S 150.7406°E) 431 metres (1,414 ft)
- Mount Shaw (24.8002°S 150.6409°E) 449 metres (1,473 ft)

Rawbelle River rises in the north-east of the locality and exits to the south (Rawbelle), where it becomes a tributary of the Nogo River, part of the Burnett River basin which ultimately flows into the Coral Sea.

== History ==
Harrami Provisional School opened on 7 July 1941 but it closed in 1945. It opened again on 15 September 1947 and in 1948 became Harrami State School. It closed permanently on 20 March 1966. It was at 1546 Harrami Road (24.76211°S 150.63941°E).

The Harrami hall of the Queensland Country Women's Association was officially opened on Sunday 30 March 1952. It was on the eastern side of Harrami Road (approx 24.7595°S 150.6395°E).

== Demographics ==
In the 2016 census, Harrami had a population of 39 people.

In the 2021 census, Harrami had a population of 22 people.

== Education ==
There are no schools in Harrami. The nearest government primary school is Thangool State School in neighbouring Thangool to the north-west. The nearest government secondary schools are Biloela State High School in Biloela to the north and Monto State High School in Monto to the east.
