= Callide Valley railway line =

Former railway line in Queensland, Australia

The Callide Valley railway line was a passenger and freight railway line in Central Queensland. Operated by Queensland Rail, the line opened in 1924 and ran from Rannes to Lawgi at its peak. Biloela was the centre of the line and was operational until freight services were withdrawn in 2013.

== History ==
There were grand plans to link Monto by railway with the south, east and north. Links with Maryborough to the south and Gladstone to the east materialised but the northern link terminated at Lawgi some 70 kilometres away. Rannes was already linked by rail to Rockhampton by the Dawson Valley railway line via Mount Morgan and a branch line from Rannes to Lawgi provided access to the rich Callide Valley and justified its construction.

=== Opening ===
The first stage commenced from Rannes, heading south-east to Callide (originally called Callidi) and opened on 3 May 1924. Stops en route were Jooro, Goovigen, Jambin and Argoon. A mixed train ran twice a week from Baralaba, west of Rannes on the Dawson Valley branch, to Callide and connected at Rannes with a service northeast to Rockhampton. A 22 kilometre extension was opened on 24 August 1925 south from Callide via Biloela to Thangool which at the time was the main township between Rannes and Monto.

== Train services ==
A mixed service took 7½ hours for the journey from Thangool to Mount Morgan and a later passenger service took 6 hours from Thangool to Rockhampton. The terminus at Thangool was intended to be temporary and trucking yards were not constructed. However, facilities were provided at Biloela siding and it quickly became the major centre of the district.

== Later stages ==
Construction beyond Thangool was halted in August 1926 and resumed during the depression as an employment creation measure. The third and final stage took the line a further 14 kilometres via Mount Scoria to Lawgi. The extension opened on 19 September 1932. Construction continued to a point about halfway between Lawgi and the next station, which would’ve been called Mount Lookerbie, before work was again halted in 1933. The line as far as Dawes is still shown as proposed on a map from 1939, but sometime in the 1940s the line was officially cancelled. The Lawgi station mistress was withdrawn in 1952 and the section to Thangool was closed on 1 July 1955. The Thangool to Biloela section closed on 31 January 1988 and Biloela became the railhead. The line between Biloela and Lawgi was taken up. It remains in place between Rannes and Biloela, though only the section between Dakenba and Earlsfield is in service.

== Timeline ==
- Rannes-Callide, 46 km, opened 3 May 1924
- Callide-Biloela-Thangool, 22 km, opened 24 August 1925
- Thangool-Lawgi, 14 km, opened 19 September 1932
- Dakenba-Callide Coalfields branch, 15 km, opened 9 November 1953
- Lawgi-Thangool closed 1 July 1955
- Thangool-Biloela, 11 km, closed 31 January 1988
- Biloela-Dakenba currently out of service
- Callide Coalfields-Dakenba-Earlsfield (junction with the Moura Short Line) in active service for coal traffic
- Koorngoo-Rannes, 24 km, closed ~1999
- Earlsfield-Koorngoo available for seasonal grain haulage

== Moura Short Line ==
In 1968 the Moura Short Line was opened to transport coal from the Callide and Moura mines to Gladstone port. The line crosses the Callide branch line between Jambin and Callide at Earlsfield Junction and thus links Biloela with Gladstone in lieu of its previous link to Rockhampton.

== Stations ==
Station	Image	Town/Locality	Opened	Closed	Coordinates	Ref
Rannes		Rannes	3 May 1924		24.10350°S 150.11820°E	
Jooro		Jooro	3 May 1924		24.11454°S 150.21150°E	
Goovigen		Goovigen	3 May 1924		24.14650°S 150.28439°E	
Jambin		Jambin	3 May 1924		24.19544°S 150.36975°E	
Argoon		Argoon	3 May 1924		24.25411°N 150.43361°E	
Callide		Callide	3 May 1924		24.30175°S 150.50867°E	
Biloela		Biloela	24 August 1925	30 June 2013	24.39949°S 150.50867°E	
Thangool		Thangool	24 August 1925	31 January 1988	24.48650°S 150.57682°E	
Kariboe		Thangool	19 September 1932	1 July 1955	24.49903°S 150.59572°E	
Mount Scoria		Mount Scoria	19 September 1932	1 July 1955	24.53451°S 150.61619°E	
Lawgi		Lawgi Dawes	19 September 1932	1 July 1955		

== See also ==
- Gladstone to Monto railway line
- Mungar Junction to Monto Branch Railway
- Rail transport in Queensland
