= Prospect, Queensland =

Prospect
- Suburb
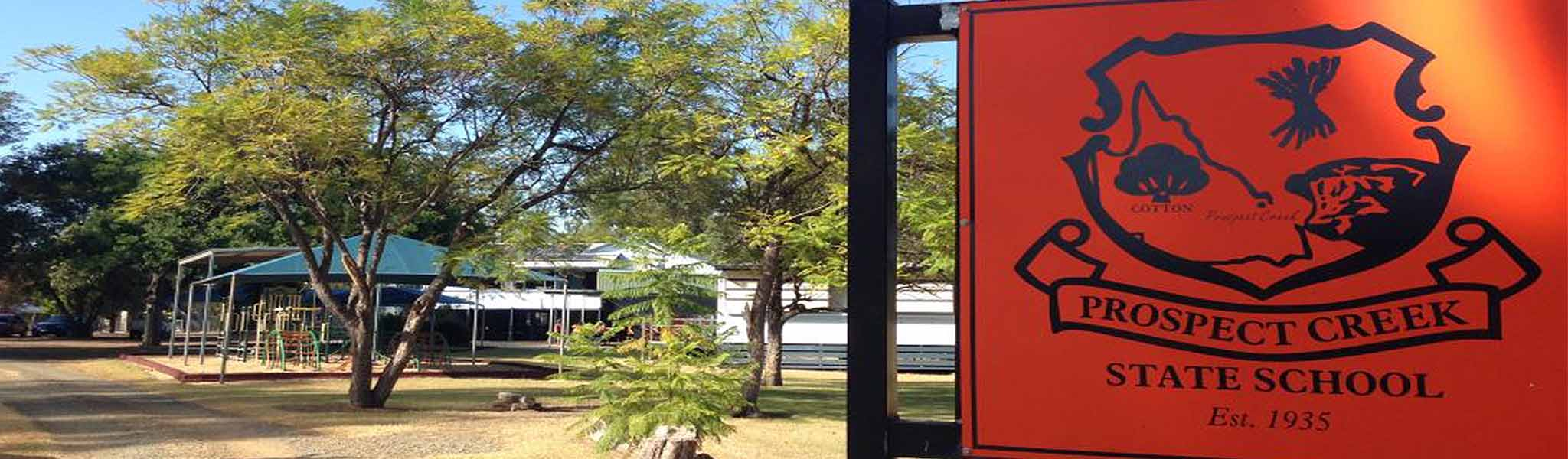
- Prospect State School, 2020

- Interactive map of Prospect
- Coordinates: 24.4972°S 150.4161°E
- Country: Australia
- State: Queensland
- LGA: Shire of Banana
- Location: 12.0 km (7.5 mi) SW of Biloela; 133 km (83 mi) SW of Gladstone; 152 km (94 mi) SSW of Rockhampton; 580 km (360 mi) NW of Brisbane

Government
  - State electorate: Callide
  - Federal division: Flynn

Area
  - Total: 417.0 km^{2} (161.0 sq mi)

Population
  - Total: 289 (2021 census)
  - Density: 0.6930/km^{2} (1.795/sq mi)
- Time zone: UTC+10:00 (AEST)
- Postcode: 4715
Suburbs around Prospect
Banana	Orange Creek	Dakenba; Biloela
Banana	Prospect	Valentine Plains
Tarramba	Castle Creek	Thangool

Prospect is a rural locality in the Shire of Banana, Queensland, Australia. In the 2021 census, Prospect had a population of 289 people.

== Geography ==
Prospect Creek is a neighbourhood (24.4166°S 150.4333°E).

Mount Bulgi (24.4723°S 150.3663°E) rises to 484 metres (1,588 ft) above sea level.

== History ==
Torsdale Farm Provisional School opened on 16 July 1919 as a half-time provisional school in conjunction with Torsdale Station Provisional School (meaning they shared a single teacher). Both schools closed on 31 December 1920 due to low student numbers.

Kooingal State School opened on 4 June 1931. It closed on 8 July 1956. It was at 1382 Crowsdale Camboon Road (24.5287°S 150.4271°E).

On 2 October 1935, Torsdale Farm Provisional School reopened. In 1944, approval was given for the establishment of a Prospect Creek State School to replace the provisional school at Torsdale Farm on the same site. Prospect Creek State School opened on 5 June 1944.

The mobile library service commenced in 2004.

== Demographics ==
In the 2016 census, Prospect had a population of 297 people.

In the 2021 census, Prospect had a population of 289 people.

== Education ==
Prospect Creek State School is a government primary (Prep-6) school for boys and girls at 12935 Dawson Highway (24.4211°S 150.4293°E). In 2018, the school had an enrolment of 42 students with 4 teachers (3 full-time equivalent) and 6 non-teaching staff (3 full-time equivalent).

There are no secondary schools in Prospect. The nearest government secondary school is Biloela State High School in neighbouring Biloela to the north-east.

== Amenities ==
Banana Shire Council provides a fortnightly mobile library service at Prospect Creek School.
