= Thangool Airport =

Airport in Queensland, Australia

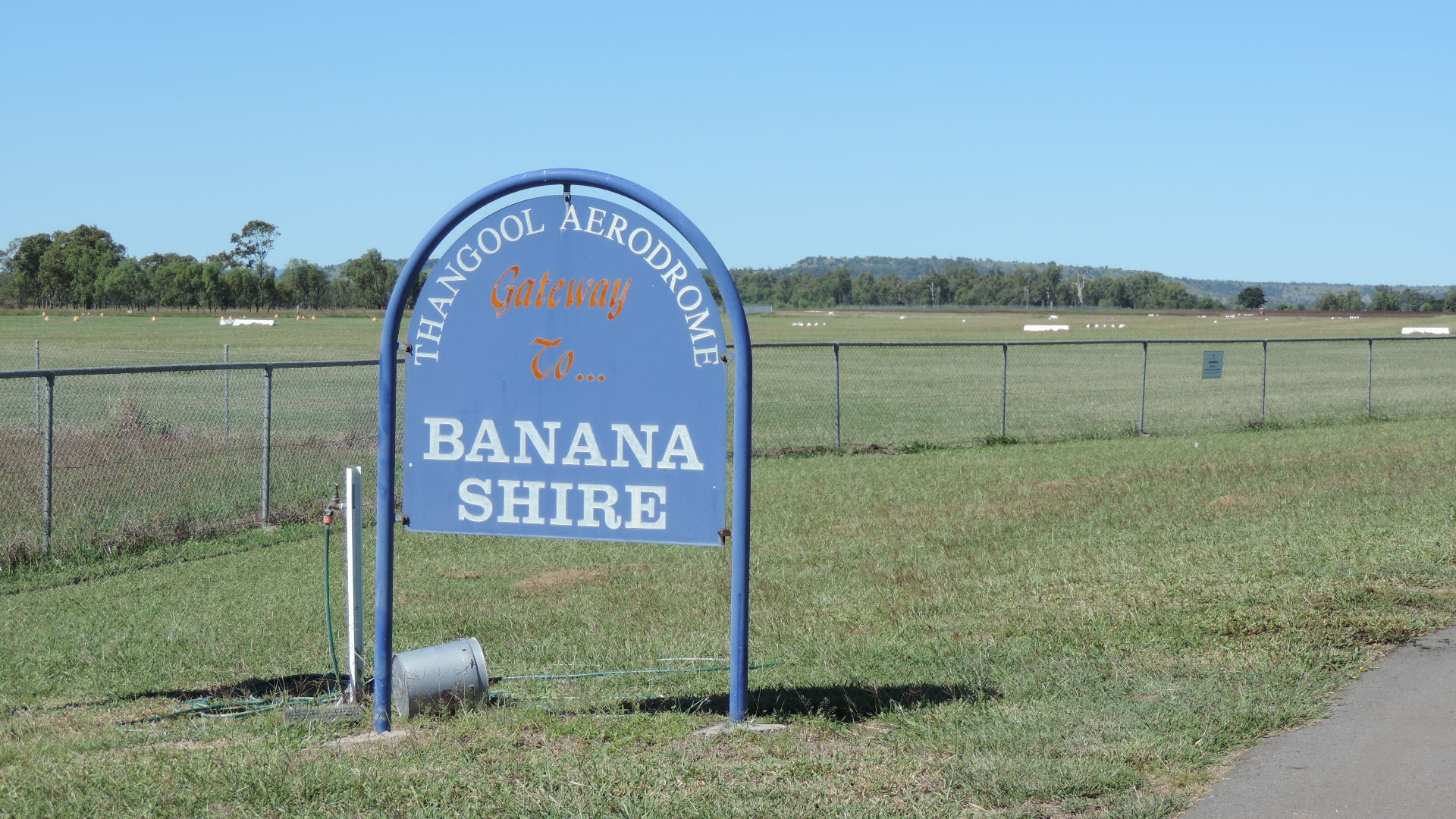
- Thangool Airport, 2014
- IATA: THG; ICAO: YTNG

Summary
- Airport type: Public
- Operator: Banana Shire Council
- Serves: Thangool, Queensland
- Location: Thangool, Queensland
- Elevation AMSL: 644 ft / 196 m
- Coordinates: 24°29′38″S 150°34′44″E

Map
- Location in Queensland

Runways
Direction	Length		Surface
Direction	m	ft	Surface
10/28	1,522	4,993	Asphalt
14/32	794	2,605	Clay
- Sources: Australian AIP and aerodrome chart

Thangool Airport (IATA: THG, ICAO: YTNG) is an airport at 42 Aerodrome Road, Thangool, Shire of Banana, Queensland, Australia. It is also known as Thangool Aerodrome. It is operated by the Banana Shire Council.

== Airlines and destinations ==
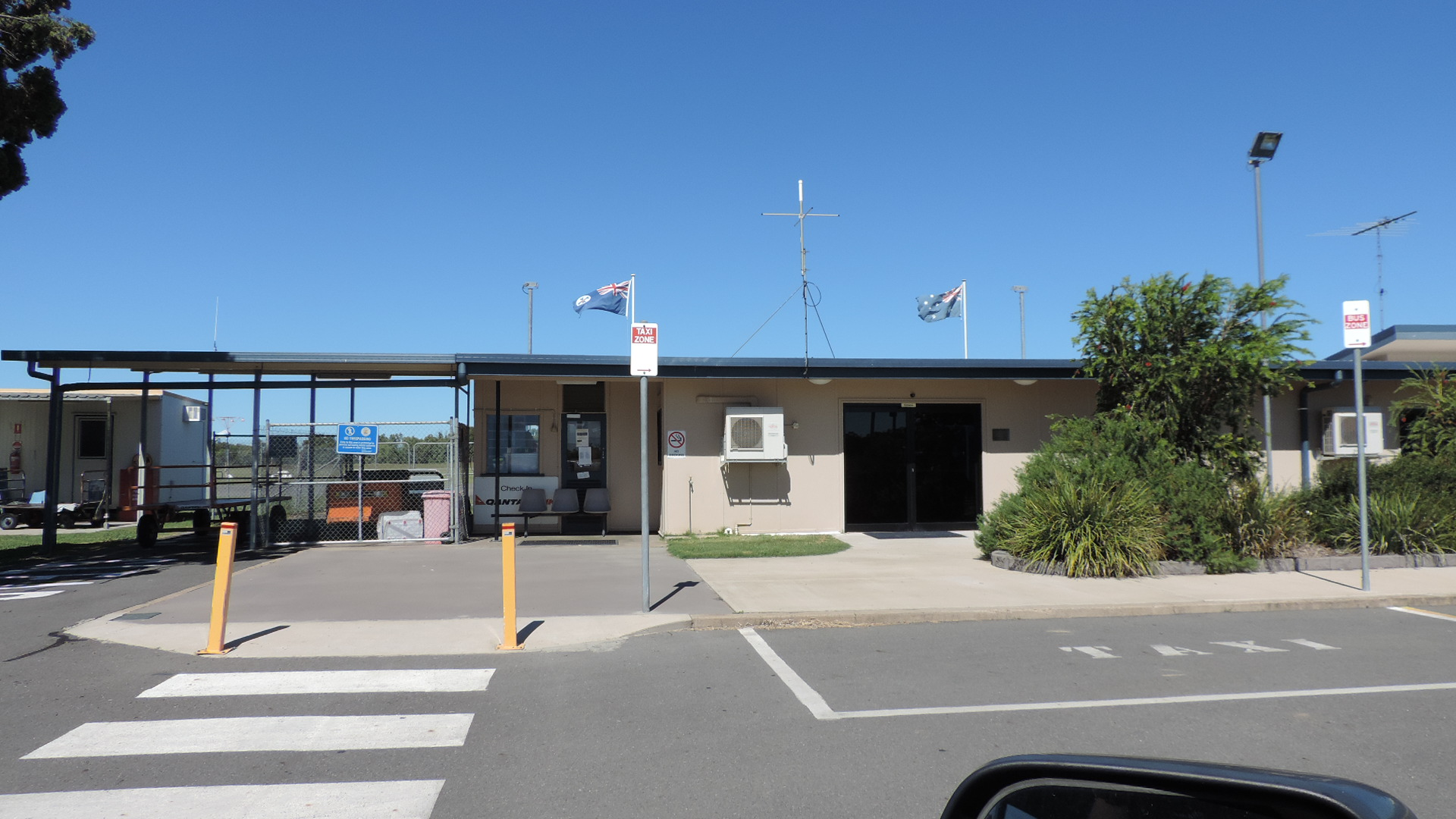
Thangool Airport terminal, 2014

Airlines	Destinations
Link Airways	Brisbane

== See also ==
- List of airports in Queensland
