= Thangool =

- Town
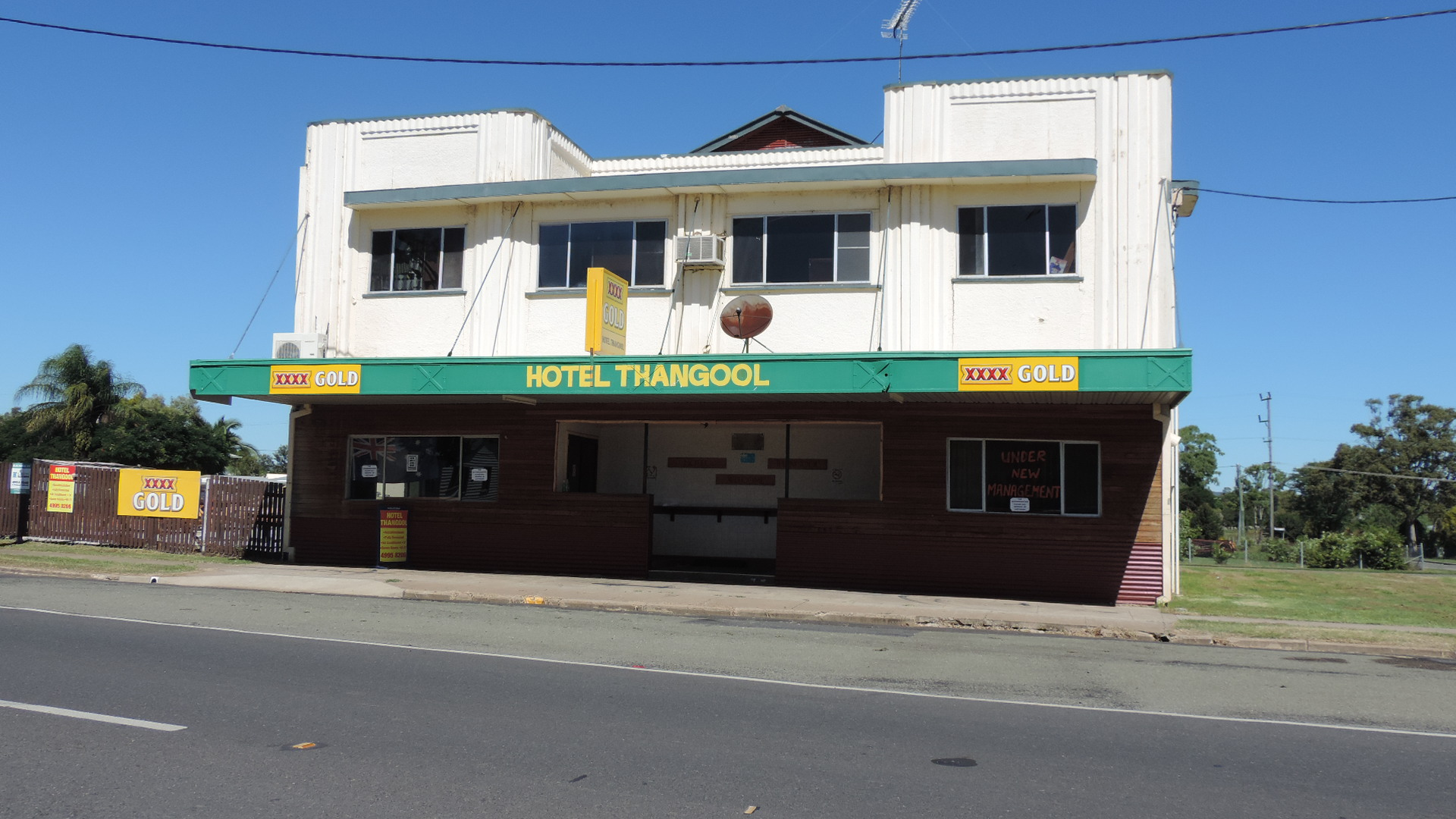
- Hotel Thangool, 2014

- Interactive map of Thangool
- Coordinates: 24.4866°S 150.5761°E
- Country: Australia
- State: Queensland
- LGA: Shire of Banana
- Location: 13.1 km (8.1 mi) SE of Biloela; 133 km (83 mi) SW of Gladstone; 155 km (96 mi) S of Rockhampton; 549 km (341 mi) NNW of Brisbane
- Established: 1925

Government
  - State electorate: Callide
  - Federal division: Capricornia

Area
  - Total: 698.7 km^{2} (269.8 sq mi)
- Elevation: 192 m (630 ft)

Population
  - Total: 685 (2021 census)
  - Density: 0.9804/km^{2} (2.5392/sq mi)
- Time zone: UTC+10:00 (AEST)
- Postcode: 4716
- Mean max temp: 29.3 °C (84.7 °F)
- Mean min temp: 13.2 °C (55.8 °F)
- Annual rainfall: 664.2 mm (26.15 in)
Localities around Thangool
Prospect	Valentine Plains	Valentine Plains
Prospect	Thangool	Lawgi Dawes
Castle Creek	Camboon	Harrami

Thangool /ˈθæŋɡuːl/ is a rural town and locality in the Shire of Banana, Queensland, Australia. In the 2021 census, the locality of Thangool had a population of 685 people.

== Geography ==
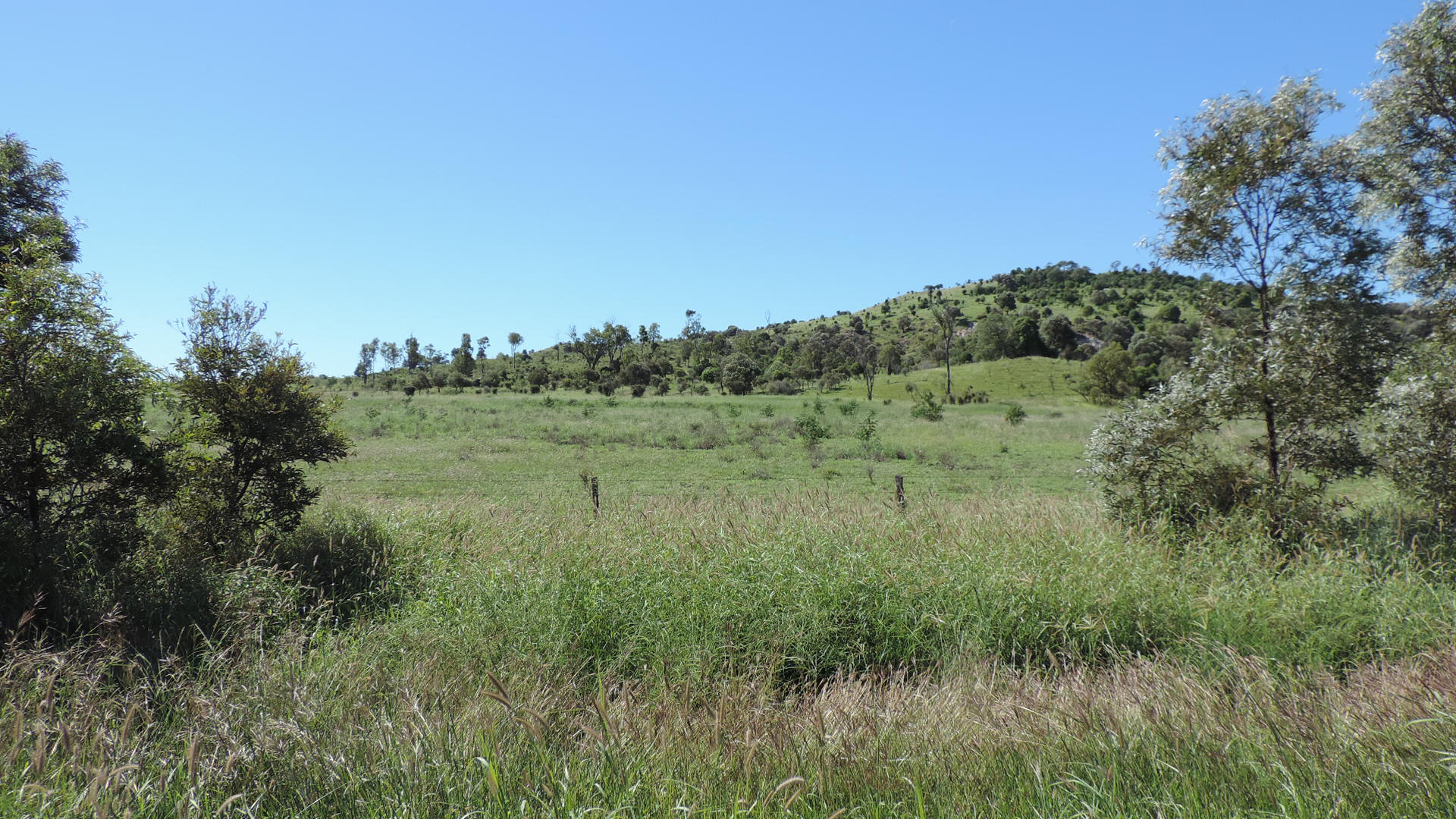
Rural landscape along the Burnett Highway north of the town of Thangool, 2014

Thangool is 591 kilometres (367 mi) north west of the state capital, Brisbane and 12 kilometres (7.5 mi) south of the Shire administrative centre, Biloela.

Kariboe is a neighbourhood (24.5°S 150.5833°E).

Mount Scoria is a neighbourhood (24.5333°S 150.5666°E).

Thangool has the following named ranges:

- Banana Range (24.7460°S 150.4638°E) in the south-west of the locality
- Dawes Range (24.7326°S 150.5550°E) in the south-east of the locality

Thangool has the following named mountains:

- Mount Lookerbie (24.6172°S 150.6009°E) 530 metres (1,740 ft)
- Mount Scoria (24.5338°S 150.5994°E) 292 metres (958 ft)
- Mount Sugarloaf (24.4542°S 150.7133°E) 484 metres (1,588 ft)
- Prospect Peak (24.7076°S 150.5018°E) 449 metres (1,473 ft)

The former Callide Valley railway line ran through the locality and had the following three now-abandoned railway stations:

- Thangool railway station (24.4865°S 150.5768°E)
- Kariboe railway station (24.4990°S 150.5957°E)
- Mount Scoria railway station (24.5345°S 150.6162°E)

The predominant land use is grazing on native vegetation with a small amount of crop growing.

=== Climate ===
Climate data for Thangool Airport (1991–2020 normals, extremes 1965–present)
Month	Jan	Feb	Mar	Apr	May	Jun	Jul	Aug	Sep	Oct	Nov	Dec	Year
Record high °C (°F)	43.1 (109.6)	42.2 (108.0)	42.4 (108.3)	36.1 (97.0)	35.0 (95.0)	30.2 (86.4)	30.1 (86.2)	34.5 (94.1)	38.7 (101.7)	40.0 (104.0)	40.4 (104.7)	41.4 (106.5)	43.1 (109.6)
Mean daily maximum °C (°F)	33.8 (92.8)	33.0 (91.4)	32.0 (89.6)	29.6 (85.3)	26.2 (79.2)	23.5 (74.3)	23.3 (73.9)	25.0 (77.0)	28.2 (82.8)	30.5 (86.9)	32.0 (89.6)	33.2 (91.8)	29.2 (84.6)
Daily mean °C (°F)	26.8 (80.2)	26.4 (79.5)	25.0 (77.0)	21.9 (71.4)	18.1 (64.6)	15.4 (59.7)	14.5 (58.1)	15.7 (60.3)	19.0 (66.2)	22.0 (71.6)	24.2 (75.6)	25.9 (78.6)	21.3 (70.3)
Mean daily minimum °C (°F)	19.8 (67.6)	19.8 (67.6)	18.0 (64.4)	14.1 (57.4)	10.0 (50.0)	7.3 (45.1)	5.7 (42.3)	6.3 (43.3)	9.9 (49.8)	13.5 (56.3)	16.3 (61.3)	18.7 (65.7)	13.3 (55.9)
Record low °C (°F)	12.3 (54.1)	12.3 (54.1)	9.2 (48.6)	0.8 (33.4)	−1.4 (29.5)	−3.4 (25.9)	−4.7 (23.5)	−3.3 (26.1)	−0.7 (30.7)	2.6 (36.7)	4.9 (40.8)	8.7 (47.7)	−4.7 (23.5)
Average precipitation mm (inches)	92.7 (3.65)	90.5 (3.56)	65.1 (2.56)	21.7 (0.85)	24.4 (0.96)	29.4 (1.16)	17.7 (0.70)	22.9 (0.90)	28.0 (1.10)	54.2 (2.13)	71.9 (2.83)	96.7 (3.81)	615.3 (24.22)
Average precipitation days (≥ 1 mm)	6.1	6.0	4.3	2.9	2.4	3.1	2.5	2.2	2.7	5.2	5.5	6.1	48.9
Average dew point °C (°F)	18.2 (64.8)	18.6 (65.5)	17.2 (63.0)	14.0 (57.2)	10.5 (50.9)	8.7 (47.7)	7.0 (44.6)	6.9 (44.4)	9.3 (48.7)	12.3 (54.1)	14.9 (58.8)	17.1 (62.8)	12.9 (55.2)
Source 1: National Oceanic and Atmospheric Administration
Source 2: Bureau of Meteorology

== History ==
The Thangool area was originally home to the Kangulu Aboriginal people. European settlement in the area began with the Archer brothers who, on advice from the explorer Ludwig Leichhardt, set out from Eidsvold Station on the Burnett River to explore the area to the north in 1853, eventually reaching the Fitzroy River. Speculative ventures followed in the 1850s and 1860s, originally tentative attempts at sheep raising, but soon turning to cattle.

The town name Thangool comes from the Thangool railway station, which existed from 2 February 1924 until 1 August 1987. It is reportedly an Aboriginal word meaning possum.

The neighbourhood Mount Scoria takes its name from the Mount Scoria railway station, assigned by the Queensland Railways Department on 21 June 1926, which is named after the mountain of the same name.

The town was surveyed in 1925 and primitive shops constructed from corrugated iron and logs were established soon after. The Callide Valley railway line was extended to Thangool in 1925, before its final extension to Lawgi in 1931.

Kariboe Creek Provisional School opened in 1926 but closed in 1927. Kariboe Creek State School opened on 9 April 1930 and closed December 1963. It was named after a local creek. Kariboe Creek State School was at 1 Mullers Lane (24.4631°S 150.5229°E).

Thangool State School opened on 5 April 1927.

Mount Scoria State School opened on 3 November 1930 and closed in July 1958. It was located to the immediate north-east of the Mount Scoria railway station (approx 24.5330°S 150.6164°E).

Thangool Baptist Church opened in 1932. Approval to construct the church was given in November 1931. A tender for the construction of the building was accepted in January 1932, with constructing commencing about June 1932. The church was officially opened on Saturday 16 July 1932. The church was 30 by 20 feet (9.1 by 6.1 m).

Kroombit Provisional School opened on 17 May 1933 and closed on 13 April 1936.

Tiamby Provisional School opened on 1 July 1933. The school closed on 31 December 1942. It was on the north-eastern corner of 3224 Crowsdale Camboon Road (24.6813°S 150.4738°E).

Clinker Creek State School opened in July 1938 and closed on 23 February 1942. It was on the south-west corner of Drumburie Road and Frawleys Road (24.56267°S 150.52876°E).

By the 1930s, a cotton boom had allowed the town to support two hotels, two butchers, two bakers, a picture theatre, a cordial factory, a blacksmith and a bank.

The name Kariboe comes from the Kariboe railway station, assigned on 19 September 1940 by the Queensland Railways Department, which in turns derives its name from pastoral run name used in mid-1850s by pastoralist Charles Archer. It is the Aboriginal language name for the local creek.

The Red Steer Hotel closed in April 2017, leaving the town without a hotel, so the Thangool Recreation Club obtained a limited liquor licence to provide a place for locals to gather for a drink.

== Demographics ==
In the 2006 census, the locality of Thangool had a population of 545 people, while the town of Thangool had a population of 339 people.

In the 2016 census, the locality of Thangool had a population of 741 people.

In the 2021 census, the locality of Thangool had a population of 685 people.

== Education ==
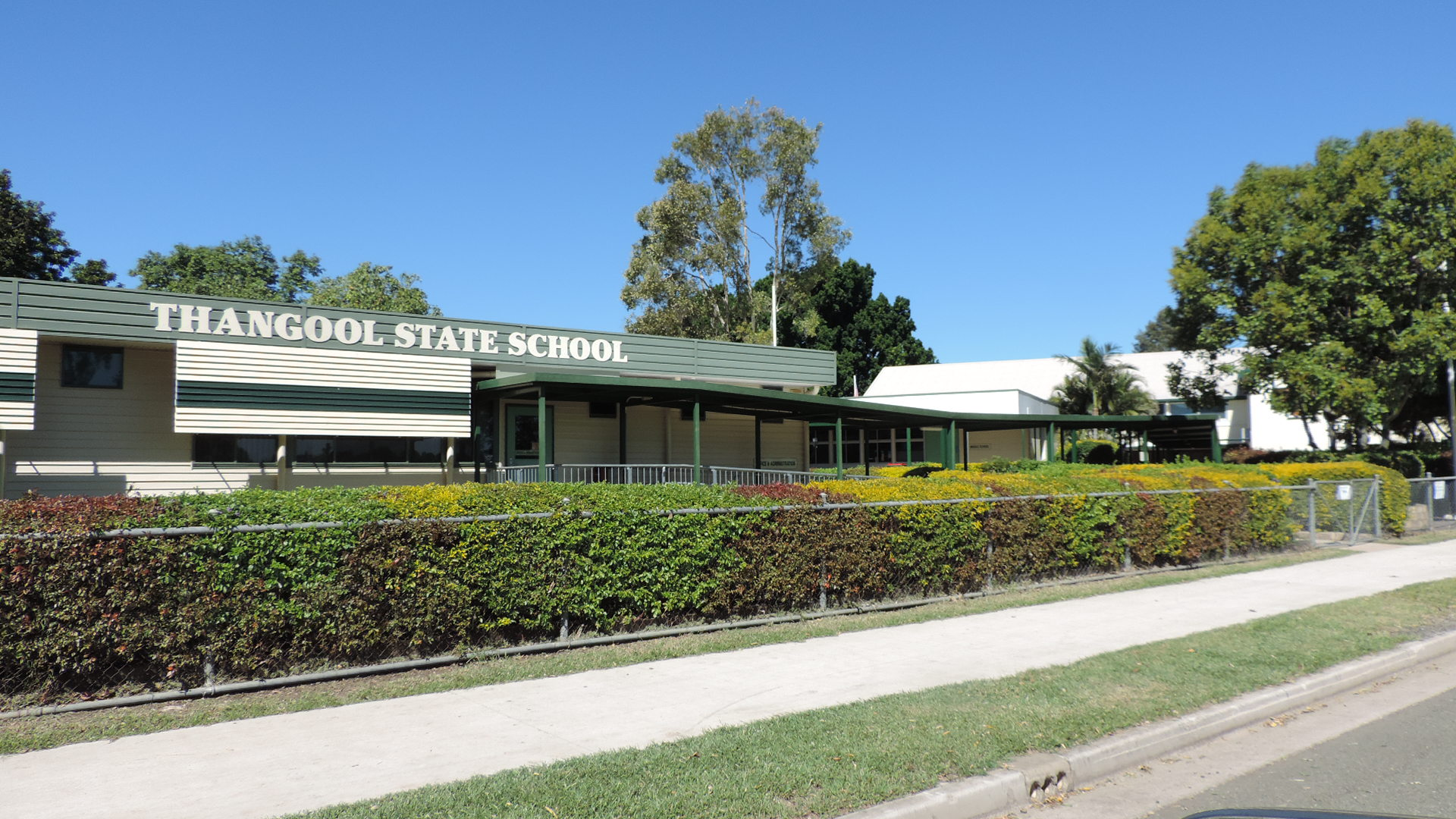
Thangool State School, 2014

Thangool State School is a government primary (Prep-6) school for boys and girls at 2 Aerodrome Road (24.4910°S 150.5716°E). In 2015 the school had 115 students enrolled. In 2018, the school had an enrolment of 143 students with 12 teachers (8 full-time equivalent) and 10 non-teaching staff (5 full-time equivalent). Thangool State School has an active Facebook page.

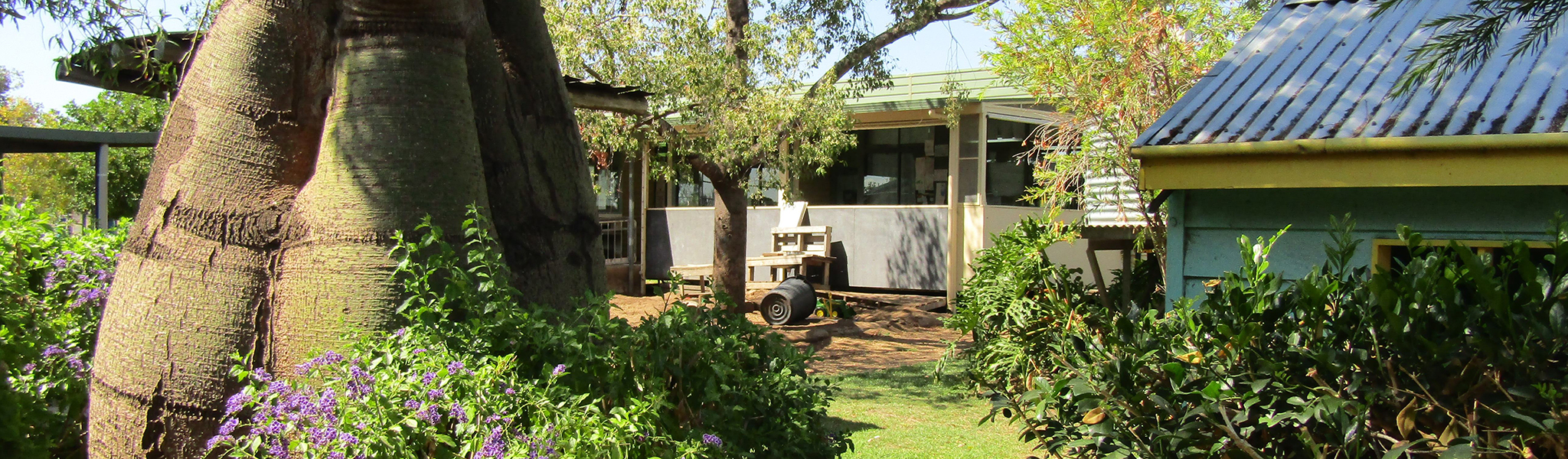
Thangool State School grounds, 2025

There are no secondary schools in Thangool. The nearest government secondary school is Biloela State High School in Biloela to the north-west.

== Economy ==
Dryland farming in the area produces mainly sorghum and wheat but also some sunflower, mung beans and barley. Irrigated crops produced include cotton and lucerne as well as wheat and sorghum. A Thangool business, Queensland Squab Processors, supply 60 per cent of the Australian market for squab while a new business producing herbs for the food service industry was developed recently.

There are a number of homesteads in the locality, including:

- Kurrajong (24.7152°S 150.4706°E)
- Peaceful Haven (24.4906°S 150.6010°E)
- Scoria (24.5473°S 150.5756°E)

== Facilities ==
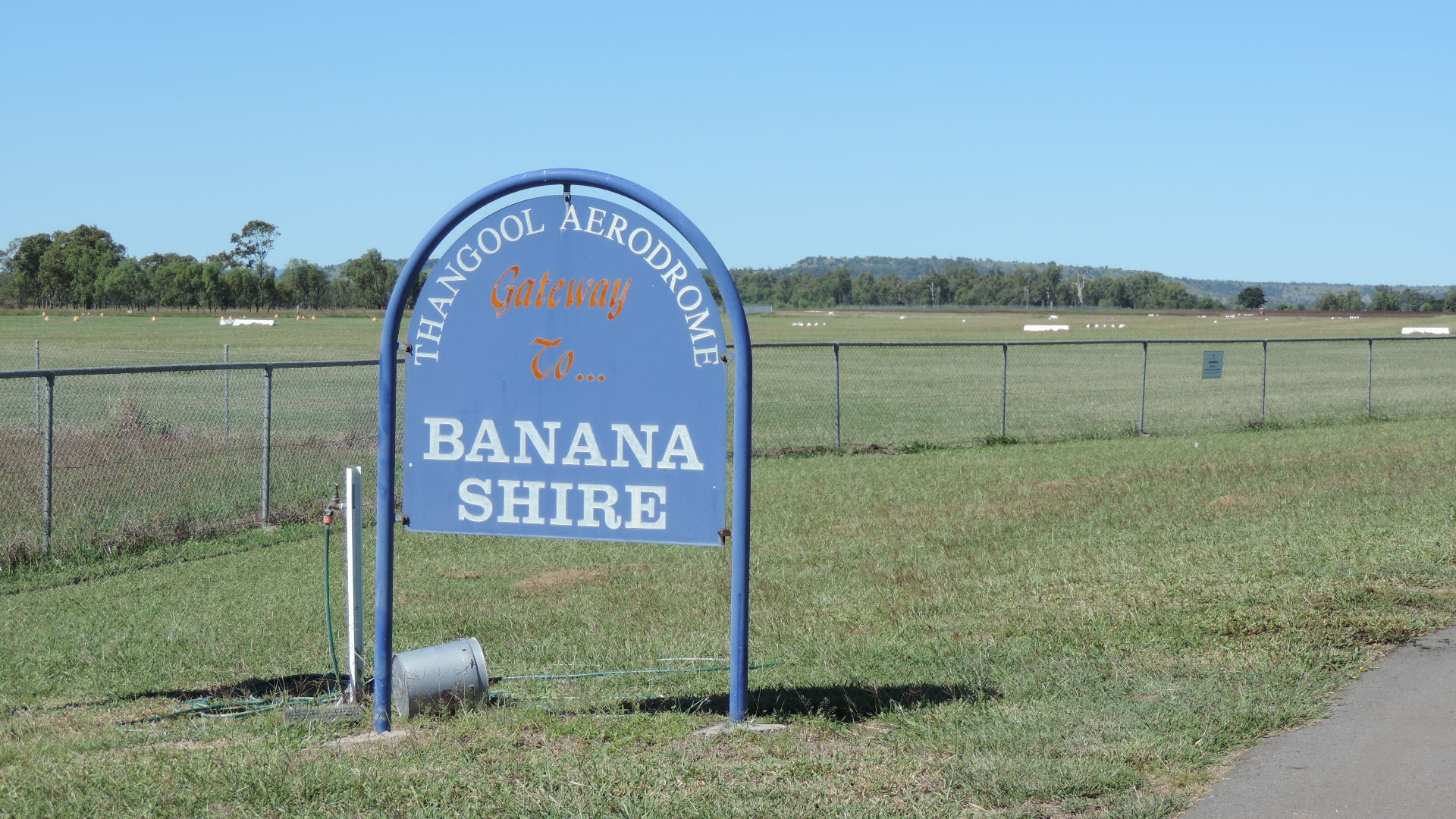
Thangool Airport, 2014

Local businesses include two hotels, a service station, post office, carpenters, welders, and an aircraft refuelling business.

The Thangool Airport (also known as Thangool Aerodrome) services the Banana Shire area. It is at 42 Aerodrome Road (24.4917°S 150.5736°E).

Thangool racecourse is one of the largest racecourses in the area.

Thangool Fire Station is at 25 Stanley Street (24.4878°S 150.5746°E).

== Amenities ==
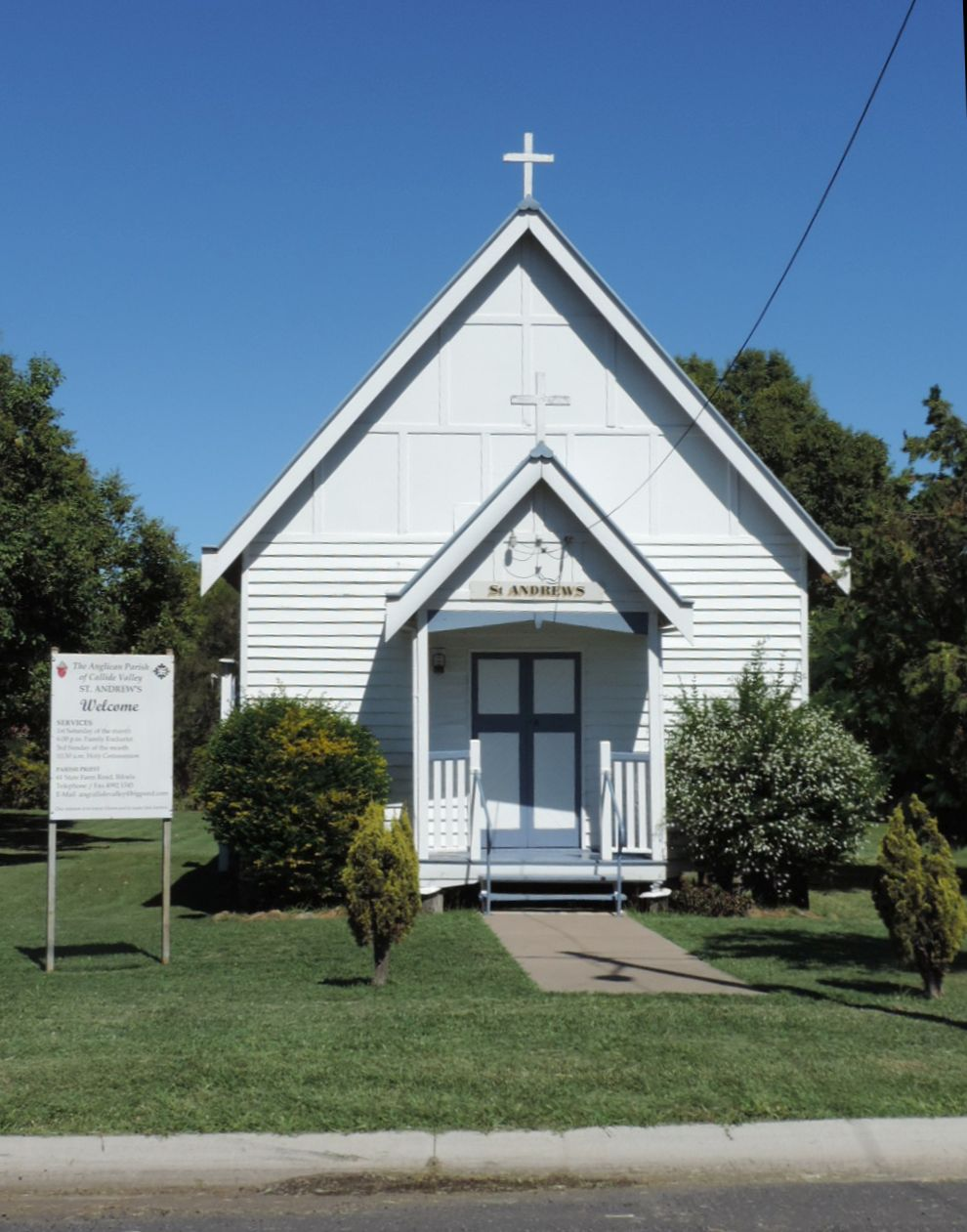
St Andrew's Anglican Church, 2014

St Andrew's Anglican Church is at 35 Stanley Street (24.4875°S 150.5739°E).

Thangool Recreational Hall is in Blanchs Road.

The Thangool branch of the Queensland Country Women's Association meets at the Thangool Recreational Hall.

== Attractions ==
Nearby Mount Scoria, a rare rock formation rising 150 metres (490 ft) above the surrounding plain, was an active volcano 20 to 26 million years ago. The mountain features impressive basalt columns formed by cooling lava. Despite its name the mountain features very little scoria, with most of the mountain made up of vesicular basalt.

== Events ==
The Thangool Cup Races is an annual horse racing event held in September. Each November there is a Christmas market.
