= Gangulu =

Aboriginal Australian people

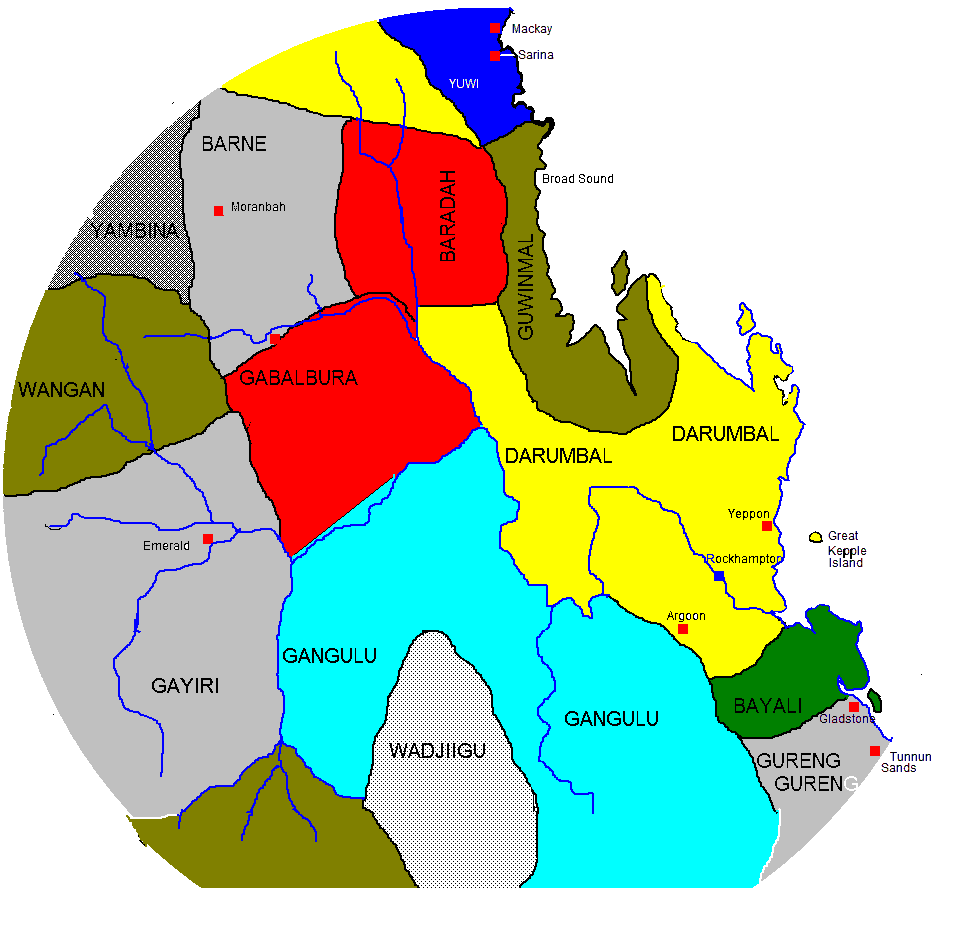
Traditional lands of Australian Aboriginal tribes around Gladstone

The Gangulu people, also written Kangulu, Kaangooloo, Ghungalu and other variations, are an Aboriginal Australian people from the Woorabinda, Duaringa and Mount Morgan area in Queensland, Australia.

== Name ==
The name Gangulu is derived from the word gangu ‘no’. This naming convention is also used in other languages of the region such as Gureng Gureng (gureng ‘no’).

== Language ==
The Gangulu language belongs to the Maric languages of the Pama-Nyungan language family. The language was silenced during the 19th and 20th centuries through the Aboriginals Protection and Restriction of the Sale of Opium Act. The Gangulu community are now working to reawaken their language.

== Country ==
Gangulu traditional lands occupy an estimated 16,000 square kilometres (6,000 mi^{2}) about the Dawson River as far south as Banana and Theodore. To the west, they extend to the Comet River, including Blackdown Tablelands and the vicinity of Woorabinda, Duaringa and Coomooboolaroo, and north to the Mackenzie River. Their eastern frontier lay towards Biloela, Mount Morgan, Gogango Range, and the upper Don River. Thangool and the headwaters of Grevillea Creek marked its southeastern limits.

== People ==
A correspondent of E. M. Curr, Peter McIntosh, a resident of the area, stated that the Gangulu were a confederation of several groups, the main ones being the Karranbal, the Maudalgo, and the Mulkali. No further data were recorded to enable ethnographer Norman Tindale to clarify the precise nature of the last two groups, but the AUSTLANG database by AIATSIS reports that the Karranbal is the Garaynbal (Garingbal) language and Maudalgo is a variant name of the Wadjigu language and people, who spoke a Bidjara dialect. Mulkali is not further described.

Along with many other Queensland tribes whose traditional lands had been annexed by colonial pastoralists, many Gangulu people were forcibly removed to the Woorabinda and Cherbourg government reserves.

== Alternative spelling ==
- Ghungalu
- Kaangooloo
- Cangoolootha (tha meant "speech")
- Khangalu, Kangalo, Kongulu, Kongalu
- Kangool-lo, Konguli, Gangulu
- Cangoolootha, Gangu, Kangool lo, Kongulu, Khang, Ghangulu, Ka ngool lo

== Sources ==
- Dixon, Robert M. W. (2002). Australian Languages: Their Nature and Development. Vol. 1. Cambridge University Press. ISBN 978-0-521-47378-1.
- Howitt, Alfred William (1904). The native tribes of south-east Australia (PDF). Macmillan.
- Kelly, C. Tennant (June 1935). "Tribes on Cherburg Settlement, Queensland". Oceania. 5 (4): 461–473. doi:10.1002/j.1834-4461.1935.tb00165.x. JSTOR 40327813.
- Mathews, R. H. (1900). "The Toara Ceremony of the Dippil Tribes of Queensland". American Anthropologist. 2 (1): 139–144. doi:10.1525/aa.1900.2.1.02a00090. JSTOR 658865.
- McIntosh, Peter (1887). "Eastern slopes of Expedition Range, Lower Dawson, Upper Fitzoy, MacKenzie and Isaacs rivers, and many of their tributaries." (PDF). In Curr, Edward Micklethwaite (ed.). The Australian race: its origin, languages, customs, place of landing in Australia and the routes by which it spread itself over the continent. Vol. 3. Melbourne: J. Ferres. pp. 58–62.
- Tindale, Norman Barnett (1974). "Kangulu (QLD)". Aboriginal Tribes of Australia: Their Terrain, Environmental Controls, Distribution, Limits, and Proper Names. Australian National University. ISBN 978-0-708-10741-6. Archived from the original on 2 October 2017.
