= Biloela =

- Town
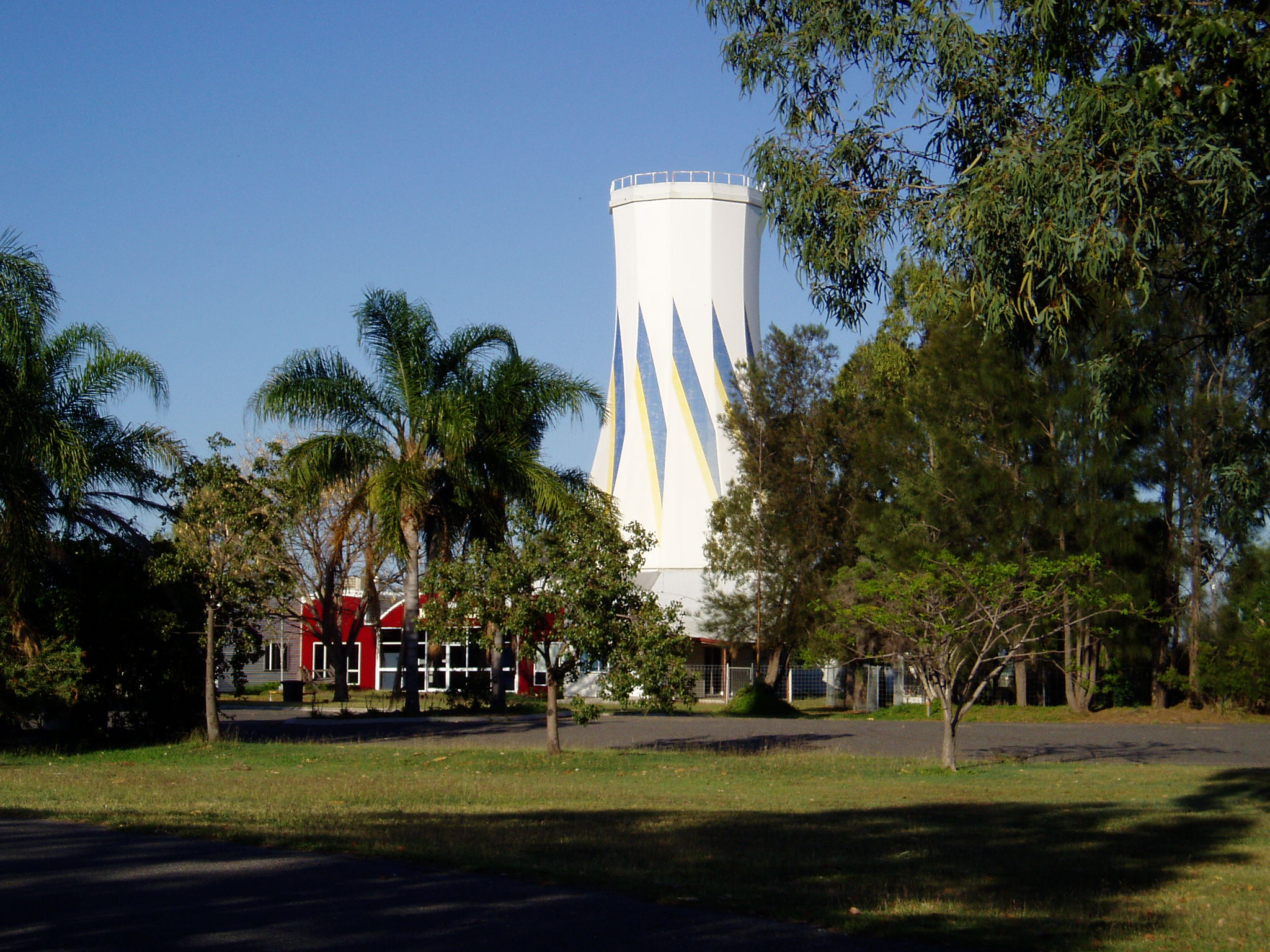
- The Silo, Biloela

- Interactive map of Biloela
- Coordinates: 24.4002°S 150.5133°E
- Country: Australia
- State: Queensland
- LGA: Shire of Banana
- Location: 121 km (75 mi) SW of Gladstone; 142 km (88 mi) SSW of Rockhampton; 569 km (354 mi) NNW of Brisbane
- Established: 1924

Government
  - State electorate: Callide
  - Federal division: Flynn

Area
  - Total: 17.6 km^{2} (6.8 sq mi)
- Elevation: 175 m (574 ft)

Population
  - Total: 5,692 (2021 census)
  - Density: 323.4/km^{2} (837.6/sq mi)
- Time zone: UTC+10:00 (AEST)
- Postcode: 4715
- Mean max temp: 28.4 °C (83.1 °F)
- Mean min temp: 12.9 °C (55.2 °F)
- Annual rainfall: 683.9 mm (26.93 in)
Localities around Biloela
Dakenba	Dakenba	Valentine Plains
Prospect	Biloela	Valentine Plains
Prospect	Prospect	Valentine Plains

Biloela (/bɪloʊˈiːlə/ BIL-oh-EE-lə) is a rural town and locality in the Shire of Banana, Central Queensland, Australia. It is the administrative centre of the shire. In the 2021 census, the locality of Biloela had a population of 5,692.

== Geography ==
Biloela is 120 kilometres (75 mi) inland from the port city of Gladstone at the junction of the Burnett and Dawson highways. Biloela is the administrative centre of the Shire of Banana, which has an area of 28,610 square kilometres (11,050 sq mi).

== History ==
=== Aboriginal history ===
The town was established on what is Gangulu tribal lands. Gangalu (Gangulu, Kangulu, Kanolu, Kaangooloo, Khangulu) is an Australian Aboriginal language spoken on Gangula country. The Gangula language region includes the towns of Clermont and Springsure extending south towards the Dawson River. There was a ceremonial bora ground behind what is now the main street of Bileola and the local entombment custom was to place the skeletal remains of their dead in hollowed out burial trees which were specially marked with red ochre. Dingoes were used in the process of mustering and killing of kangaroo and emu for food.

=== Prairie pastoral property ===
British colonisation began in 1854 when Frederick Morton established a large squatting pastoral property in the area, which he named Prairie. This leasehold comprised around 500 square miles of land in the Callide valley and Morton built his homestead not far from the present day location of the town of Biloela. Morton initially ran Prairie as a sheep station but later it was used to farm cattle.

In 1864, Morton decided to "disperse" a group of Aboriginal people for the taking of some sheep. He and other local settlers, armed and mounted on horses, set off on a night-time attack on a local Aboriginal camp. The people in the camp were made aware of the oncoming horsemen and set up an ambush. Morton's group was either warned at the last minute of the impending ambush or, according to historian John Bird, they were beaten back by the Aboriginal counter-attack and forced to retreat.

In 1873, a Native Police detachment of Alexander Douglas was accused of a massacre of an unknown number of Aboriginal people. An enquiry with several witnesses found that Douglas and his troopers had shot an Aboriginal man named Harry, who was shot while evading capture on a warrant for an "outrage" on a woman. The inquiry exonerated Douglas from the charge of wantonly destroying life. The local colonists signed a petition for him to conduct further patrols. An Aboriginal survivor of Douglas' raids named Etamitcham later described how as a child he and his family were chased over the Kroombit Mountains to avoid "being shot down". Aboriginal people were employed on Prairie Station and they considered themselves to be "well compensated" by being paid with trinkets and tobacco.

In 1886, most of Prairie was subdivided and sold off, with Montague Beak coming into ownership of what remained. Prairie was then resumed by the government in 1925 and completely divided into small land selections for urban development.

=== Township of Biloela ===
The name Biloela comes from the Gamilaraay language of northern New South Wales meaning "white cockatoo". The Government dockyards in Sydney were known as Biloela during 1871–1913 in an endeavour to remove the perceived stigma of the prior Cockatoo Island convict establishment.

The town was gazetted in 1924; it was on the Rannes-Monto railway line. Land sales were held in Rannes in December 1924.

Biloela Post Office opened by January 1925.

Biloela Provisional School opened on 22 June 1925 and become Biloela State School in 1928. An opportunity class commenced on 29 January 1975, becoming a special education unit in January 1979. On 4 February 1957, a secondary department was opened, closing when Biloela State High School opened on 28 January 1963.

Callide Bridge State School opened 10 June 1929 but had a number of name changes in 1929 including Melton and Raeworth before becoming Raedon State School. It closed in 1959. It was at 11 Teys Road (24.3662°S 150.4985°E), now within Biloela but on the locality boundary with Dakenba.

St Joseph's Catholic Primary School was established by the Sisters of Mercy and opened on 31 January 1939. The Sisters operated the school until 1980 when the first lay principal was appointed.

The first open-cut mine was established in 1942.

In 1963, work began on the Callide Power Station.

== Heritage listings ==
Biloela has a number of heritage-listed sites, including:

- 48 Gladstone Road: Greycliffe Homestead

== Demographics ==
In the 2021 census, the locality of Biloela had a population of 5,692.

In the 2016 census, the locality of Biloela had a population of 5,758.

== Climate ==
Biloela has a humid subtropical climates (Köppen: Cfa), with hot, wet summers and mild, dry winters with cool nights. Average maxima vary from 33.2 °C (91.8 °F) in January to 21.9 °C (71.4 °F) in July while average minima fluctuate between 19.8 °C (67.6 °F) in January and 5.2 °C (41.4 °F) in July. Mean average annual precipitation is moderately low, 683.9 mm (26.93 in), is highly concentrated during the summer, and is spread across 55.0 precipitation days (above the 1.0 mm (0.039 in) threshold). Extreme temperatures have ranged from 44.0 °C (111.2 °F) on 18 November 1990 to −4.3 °C (24.3 °F) on 26 July 1965.

Climate data for Biloela (24º22'48"S, 150º31'12"E, 175 m AMSL) (1924–1996 normals, extremes 1965–1996)
Month	Jan	Feb	Mar	Apr	May	Jun	Jul	Aug	Sep	Oct	Nov	Dec	Year
Record high °C (°F)	43.9 (111.0)	42.3 (108.1)	42.0 (107.6)	35.5 (95.9)	31.7 (89.1)	30.0 (86.0)	27.7 (81.9)	31.7 (89.1)	37.6 (99.7)	38.0 (100.4)	44.0 (111.2)	41.5 (106.7)	44.0 (111.2)
Mean daily maximum °C (°F)	33.2 (91.8)	32.2 (90.0)	31.2 (88.2)	28.9 (84.0)	25.4 (77.7)	22.2 (72.0)	21.9 (71.4)	23.9 (75.0)	27.0 (80.6)	29.8 (85.6)	31.7 (89.1)	32.9 (91.2)	28.4 (83.1)
Mean daily minimum °C (°F)	19.8 (67.6)	19.5 (67.1)	17.7 (63.9)	13.7 (56.7)	10.1 (50.2)	6.5 (43.7)	5.2 (41.4)	5.6 (42.1)	8.6 (47.5)	13.2 (55.8)	16.4 (61.5)	18.4 (65.1)	12.9 (55.2)
Record low °C (°F)	14.0 (57.2)	12.8 (55.0)	8.0 (46.4)	3.1 (37.6)	−0.7 (30.7)	−3.9 (25.0)	−4.3 (24.3)	−3.3 (26.1)	−0.3 (31.5)	2.0 (35.6)	6.0 (42.8)	10.7 (51.3)	−4.3 (24.3)
Average precipitation mm (inches)	101.3 (3.99)	101.4 (3.99)	63.1 (2.48)	38.0 (1.50)	41.4 (1.63)	34.4 (1.35)	30.1 (1.19)	21.4 (0.84)	23.3 (0.92)	54.0 (2.13)	76.5 (3.01)	98.6 (3.88)	683.9 (26.93)
Average precipitation days (≥ 1.0 mm)	7.6	6.7	5.0	3.4	3.4	3.0	2.9	2.4	2.6	5.0	6.1	6.9	55
Mean monthly sunshine hours	254.2	214.7	244.9	237.0	226.3	228.0	244.9	263.5	270.0	275.9	270.0	275.9	3,005.3
Percentage possible sunshine	61	59	65	69	67	71	73	75	75	70	68	65	68
Source: Bureau of Meteorology (1924–1996 normals, extremes 1965–1996)

Thangool Airport is located 13.8 kilometres (8.6 mi) SE of Bileola. The weather station has been operational since 1929 for rainfall and 1992 for temperature.

Climate data for Thangool Airport (24º29'24"S, 150º34'12"E, 193 m AMSL) (1992–2024 normals and extremes, rainfall 1929–2024)
Month	Jan	Feb	Mar	Apr	May	Jun	Jul	Aug	Sep	Oct	Nov	Dec	Year
Record high °C (°F)	43.1 (109.6)	42.2 (108.0)	42.4 (108.3)	36.1 (97.0)	35.0 (95.0)	30.2 (86.4)	30.1 (86.2)	34.5 (94.1)	38.7 (101.7)	40.0 (104.0)	40.4 (104.7)	41.4 (106.5)	43.1 (109.6)
Mean daily maximum °C (°F)	33.7 (92.7)	33.1 (91.6)	32.1 (89.8)	29.6 (85.3)	26.2 (79.2)	23.5 (74.3)	23.3 (73.9)	25.1 (77.2)	28.2 (82.8)	30.6 (87.1)	31.9 (89.4)	33.1 (91.6)	29.2 (84.6)
Mean daily minimum °C (°F)	19.8 (67.6)	19.8 (67.6)	18.1 (64.6)	14.1 (57.4)	10.0 (50.0)	7.0 (44.6)	5.8 (42.4)	6.4 (43.5)	9.8 (49.6)	13.6 (56.5)	16.3 (61.3)	18.6 (65.5)	13.3 (55.9)
Record low °C (°F)	12.3 (54.1)	12.3 (54.1)	9.2 (48.6)	0.8 (33.4)	−1.4 (29.5)	−3.4 (25.9)	−4.7 (23.5)	−3.3 (26.1)	−0.7 (30.7)	2.6 (36.7)	4.9 (40.8)	8.7 (47.7)	−4.7 (23.5)
Average precipitation mm (inches)	94.6 (3.72)	92.5 (3.64)	64.1 (2.52)	33.0 (1.30)	37.3 (1.47)	30.9 (1.22)	28.5 (1.12)	22.9 (0.90)	24.7 (0.97)	57.8 (2.28)	75.1 (2.96)	94.2 (3.71)	655.1 (25.79)
Average precipitation days (≥ 1.0 mm)	6.4	6.0	5.0	3.1	2.9	2.9	2.9	2.3	2.5	5.0	5.5	6.2	50.7
Average afternoon relative humidity (%)	44	50	42	42	41	44	40	36	34	35	39	44	41
Average dew point °C (°F)	17.5 (63.5)	18.4 (65.1)	15.8 (60.4)	13.3 (55.9)	10.0 (50.0)	8.6 (47.5)	6.8 (44.2)	6.7 (44.1)	8.3 (46.9)	10.6 (51.1)	13.6 (56.5)	16.5 (61.7)	12.2 (53.9)
Source: Bureau of Meteorology (1992–2024 normals and extremes, rainfall 1929–2024)

== Industry ==
Biloela and the Banana Shire, dubbed by the council as "The Shire of Opportunity", has a diverse range of industries. Extensive grazing and cropping concerns are found in the area. Cotton, sorghum and wheat are grown in the area. The Callide Power Stations lie just north of the town. Coal was discovered on Callide Creek in 1891 and is now mined at the nearby Callide and Boundary Hill mines which supply the power station. The third largest abattoir in Queensland is situated in the town.

Callide is an open-cut mining operation providing low sulphur, sub-bituminous thermal coal primarily for Queensland's domestic power generation.

== Dinosaurs ==
Dinosaur footprint fossils had been documented in the scientific literature as early as 2000, namely those attributable to ornithopod and theropod track-makers, however, no fossils were shown or described, nor specific locality data provided. Confirmation came in 2020 with the first ichnological descriptions of tracks originating from Lower Jurassic (Hettangian–Sinemurian) aged Precipice Sandstone from the Callide open-pit mine. Purportedly hundreds of small- to medium-sized three-toed tracks resembling bird footprints were observed in the overburden dumps associated with the Dunn Creek Mining area in 1998, with others noted and photographed in 2010, enough to create a virtual 3D model via photogrammetry methods. The 18-centimetre (7.1 in) long blunt-toed track was attributed as registered by a medium-sized Anomoepus-like "Anomoepid" track-maker and resembles those of ornithischian footprints found from the only other Early Jurassic Australian dinosaur fossil sites: Mount Morgan and Carnarvon Gorge, these being the first to be discovered preserved as an impression rather than as track infills.

In 2025, Dr Anthony Romilio from The University of Queensland led research that described many more dinosaur footprints. These included one of the highest concentrations of dinosaur fossil footprints in the world (70+ footprints per square metre) that were found at a local High School, as well as footprints from a boulder at a carpark. The media found these aspects very interesting and even included a cartoon representation of this research in The Guardian.

The local high school won national fame on account of its dinosaur display and specimen with 66 footprints.

== Callide Dam ==
The closest fresh water depository is the Callide Dam, however it is often well below capacity due to low rainfall in the area. Despite this, the dam acts as a popular site for water skiing, camping, swimming and fishing. In particular, the dam is a haven for eel-tailed catfish, yellowbelly, saratoga and barramundi. The largest barramundi recorded was at the 2008 Callide Dam fishing competition, measuring 138 centimetres (54 in).

The Callide Dam was constructed in 1965 to supply water for a nearby power station in Biloela. Callide Dam holds 136,300 megalitres (3.60×10^{10} US gal) at an average depth of 10.5 metres (34 ft) and a surface area of 1,240 hectares (3,100 acres) at full capacity. The dam supplies water to the Callide Power Station.

== Education ==
Biloela State School is a government primary (Early Childhood–6) school for boys and girls at 48 Rainbow Street (24.3983°S 150.5161°E). In 2017, the school had an enrolment of 364 students with 32 teachers (27 full-time equivalent) and 19 non-teaching staff (13 full-time equivalent). It includes a special education program.

St Joseph's Catholic Primary School is a Catholic primary (Prep–6) school for boys and girls at 66 Rainbow Street (24.3969°S 150.5147°E). In 2017, the school had an enrolment of 224 students with 20 teachers (19 full-time equivalent) and 14 non-teaching staff (5 full-time equivalent).

Biloela State High School is a government secondary (7–12) school for boys and girls at the corner of Scoria Street and Gladstone Road (24.3988°S 150.5178°E). In 2017, the school had an enrolment of 577 students with 56 teachers (53 full-time equivalent) and 32 non-teaching staff (22 full-time equivalent). It includes a special education program. By July 2026, the school enrolment had decreased by 12.5% over 15 months, the sports carnival was cancelled, and senior school subjects ceased due to lack of teachers.

Redeemer Lutheran College is a private primary and secondary (Prep–11) school for boys and girls at 2 Collard Street (24.4014°S 150.5190°E). In 2017, the school had an enrolment of 253 students with 18 teachers and 19 non-teaching staff (14 full-time equivalent).

== Amenities ==
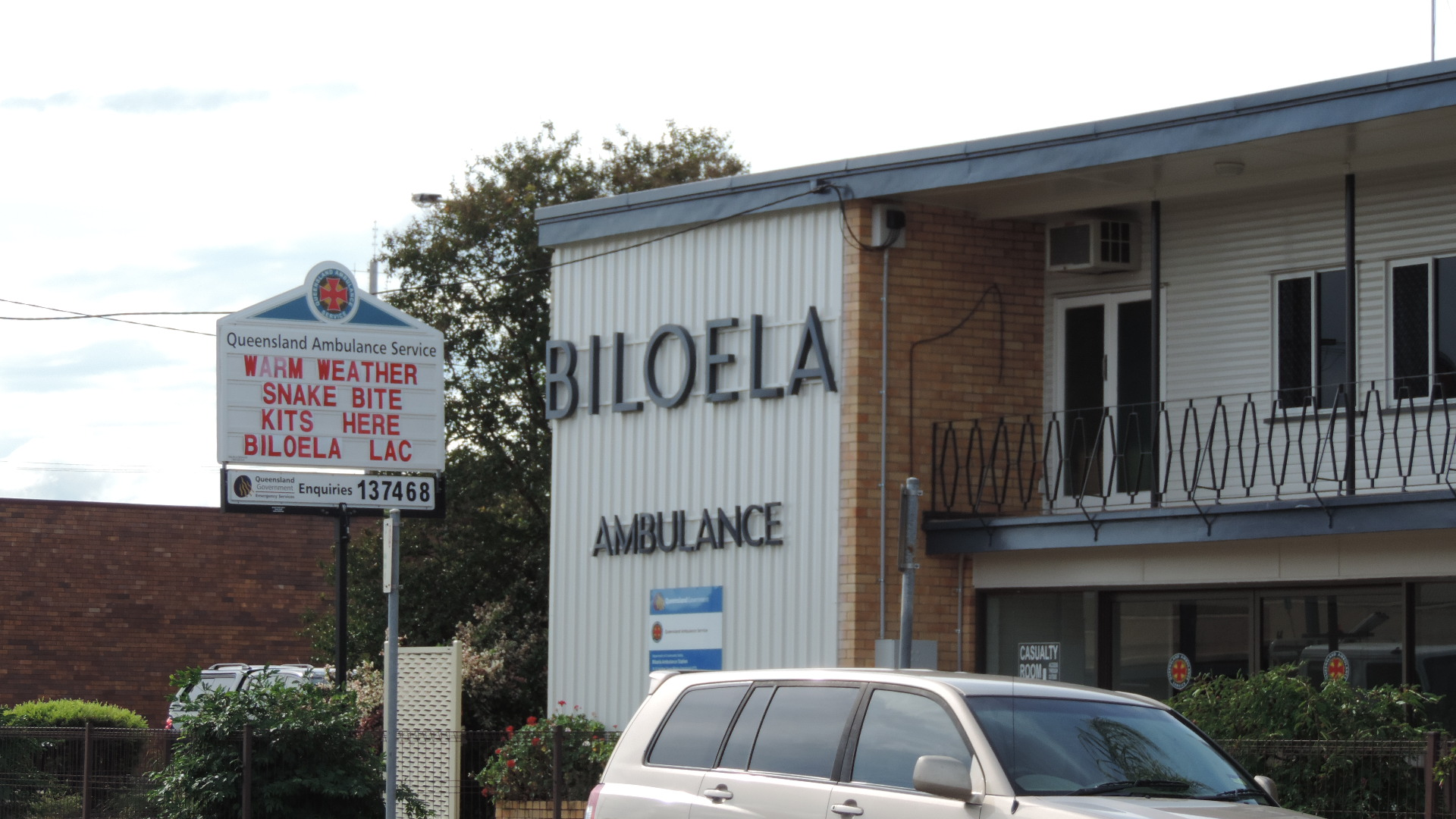
Ambulance station, 2014

The Banana Shire Council has its shire chambers at 62 Valentine Plains Road. There is an ambulance station at 32 Kariboe Street.

Banana Shire Council operate a library on the corner of Grevillea and Melton Streets.

The Valentine Plains branch of the Queensland Country Women's Association meets at the CWA Hall at 271 Valentines Plains Road, Valentine Plains.

Callide Valley Faith Community (also known as Biloela Uniting Church) has its Biloela church at 90–92 Kroombit Street (24.3970°S 150.5118°E). It is part of the Uniting Church of Australia.

== Events ==
In March, the Callide Dam plays host to the annual Callide Dam Fishing Competition, in which a number of introduced stock are caught.

In April, Rotary holds its annual ute muster.

The Callide Valley Show including the Callide Valley Ball and the Rodeo are held each May.

The Callide Dawson Machinery Preservation Club holds an annual Old Wheels in Motion rally in July.

November has a number of annual events: the Arts and Crafts Day, the Brigalow Arts Festival and the Biloela Festival.

== Sports ==
Various sporting organisations are active within the community, such as Panthers Rugby League Club, Biloela Rugby Union Club, Biloela Touch Football Association, Callide Valley Tennis Association, Biloela Netball Association, Biloela Golf Club, Biloela Cricket Association, Biloela Valley's Football Club (soccer), Biloela Swimming Club, Biloela Dirt Rider Club, the Biloela Police Citizens Youth Club, SSAA Biloela Branch Shooting Range, Callide Dawson Clay Target Club, Callide Dawson Pistol Club and Biloela Rifle Club (Queensland Rifle Association).

The local rugby league team are the Biloela Panthers. They compete in the Rockhampton District Rugby League competition.

== Media ==
Biloela's local newspaper is the Central Telegraph, which is issued weekly. The newspaper was formerly owned by APN News & Media but has been owned by News Corp Australia since 2016.

Gladstone-based AM radio station 4CC services the Biloela area via a local transmitter that broadcasts on a separate frequency to the main Gladstone transmitter. This enables 4CC to play separate commercial breaks in the Biloela region, to attract Biloela businesses to buy advertising to target people in the local area as opposed to the entire Central Queensland region.

Rebel Media stations Rebel FM and The Breeze also broadcast to Biloela and other centres in the Banana Shire, although neither station has any local programming as all their programs originate from studios on the Gold Coast. Rebel FM has a new rock and classic rock music format while The Breeze offers an easy adult contemporary and classics hits format.

Biloela receives all free-to-air television services part of the Central Queensland television market, therefore receives the Rockhampton-based television stations and their associated local news bulletins and commercial breaks. News from the Biloela area is often included in the local news bulletins originating from Rockhampton.

== "Biloela family" asylum seekers ==
In a long-running case in which a couple of Tamil asylum seekers, Kokilapathmapriya Nadesalingam (Priya) and Nadesalingam Murugappan (Nades), were refused refugee status after settling and starting a family in Biloela, the community rallied to support the family, who became known as "the Biloela family" in the press. The family were removed in a dawn raid on their home and taken to Melbourne in March 2018, pending deportation. Various legal avenues were subsequently pursued, with the family taken to Christmas Island Detention Centre in late August 2018. In April 2020 they were awarded costs of more than A$200,000 against the federal government, for lack of procedural fairness in assessing their youngest daughter's claim.

On 26 May 2022, after a four-year campaign to allow the family to return to Biloela, the interim Minister for Home Affairs, Jim Chalmers, granted the family bridging visas to reside in Australia whilst their immigration case is resolved, fulfilling an election promise by the newly-elected Albanese government. The family returned to Biloela in early June 2022.

As of August 2025 the family are settled in Biloela. They run a food truck business called Priya Nades Kitchen and say that they are very happy to be living there. A play based on their story, called Back to Bilo, premiered at the Brisbane Festival in September 2025.

== Sister city ==
Biloela is twinned with Boulouparis, New Caledonia.

== See also ==
- HMAS Biloela
- Thangool Airport
