= West Stowe, Queensland =

West Stowe
- Suburb
- Interactive map of West Stowe
- Coordinates: 23.9227°S 151.1297°E
- Country: Australia
- State: Queensland
- LGA: Gladstone Region
- Location: 17.4 km (10.8 mi) NNW of Calliope; 22.9 km (14.2 mi) WSW of Gladstone CBD; 23.5 km (14.6 mi) SE of Mount Larcom; 99.4 km (61.8 mi) SE of Rockhampton; 549 km (341 mi) NNW of Brisbane

Government
  - State electorate: Gladstone
  - Federal division: Flynn

Area
  - Total: 120.6 km^{2} (46.6 sq mi)

Population
  - Total: 391 (2021 census)
  - Density: 3.242/km^{2} (8.397/sq mi)
- Time zone: UTC+10:00 (AEST)
- Postcode: 4680
Suburbs around West Stowe
Aldoga	Yarwun	Byellee
East End	West Stowe	Beecher
Wooderson	Calliope; River Ranch	Burua

West Stowe is a rural locality in the Gladstone Region, Queensland, Australia. It is immediately west of the Gladstone urban area and immediately south of the small town of Yarwun. In the 2021 census, West Stowe had a population of 391 people.

== Geography ==
The Calliope River forms the southern boundary and most of the eastern boundary.

The Bruce Highway enters the locality from the south (River Ranch) and exists to the south-west (East End).The Gladstone–Mount Larcom Road (State Route 58) runs along part of the northern boundary.

The North Coast railway line also forms part of the north and north-eastern boundary. There are two stations on the north-east boundary:

- Mount Miller railway station (23.8525°S 151.1651°E)
- Wiggins Island Balloon Loop railway station (23.8625°S 151.1718°E)

The Wiggins Island Balloon Loop is a 13-kilometre (8.1 mi) balloon loop within West Stowe. The loop is for unloading coal trains and transferring the coal onto a conveyor belt to the Wiggins Island Coal Export Terminal in Callemondah where it is loaded onto ships.

The terrain varies from 10 to 314 metres (33 to 1,030 ft) above sea level. There are a number of named peaks, all in the north of the locality:

- Mount Sugarloaf (23.8584°S 151.1003°E) 316 metres (1,037 ft)
- Mount Martin (23.8747°S 151.1610°E) 228 metres (748 ft)
- Mount Stowe (23.8947°S 151.1657°E) 239 metres (784 ft)
- White Hill (23.9054°S 151.1436°E) 81 metres (266 ft)

Calliope Conservation Park is in the north-east of the locality and there are three sections of the Mount Stowe State Forest in the north of the locality. Apart from these protected areas, the land use is predominantly grazing on native vegetation.

== History ==
The locality was officially named and bounded on 27 August 1999. It most likely takes its name from the parish.

The Wiggins Island Balloon Loop was built in 2012 to 2013.

== Demographics ==
In the 2016 census, West Stowe had a population of 311 people.

In the 2021 census, West Stowe had a population of 391 people.

== Education ==
There are no schools in West Stowe. The nearest government primary schools are:

- Yarwun State School in neighbouring Yarwun to the north
- Clinton State School in Clinton (suburb of Gladstone) to the north-east
- Calliope State School in Calliope to the south-east
- Mount Larcom State School in Mount Larcom to the north-west

The nearest government secondary schools are:

- Gladstone State High School (to Year 12) in West Gladstone (suburb of Gladstone) to the north-east
- Calliope State High School (to Year 12) in Calliope to the south-east
- Mount Larcom State School (to Year 10) in Mount Larcom to the north-east

There are also non-government schools available in Gladstone.
