= Beecher, Queensland =

Beecher
- Suburb
- Interactive map of Beecher
- Coordinates: 23.9111°S 151.2047°E
- Country: Australia
- State: Queensland
- LGA: Gladstone Region
- Location: 11.5 km (7.1 mi) SW of Gladstone CBD; 114 km (71 mi) SE of Rockhampton; 532 km (331 mi) NNW of Brisbane

Government
  - State electorate: Gladstone
  - Federal division: Flynn

Area
  - Total: 18.9 km^{2} (7.3 sq mi)

Population
  - Total: 876 (2021 census)
  - Density: 46.35/km^{2} (120.0/sq mi)
- Time zone: UTC+10:00 (AEST)
- Postcode: 4680
Suburbs around Beecher
West Stowe	Byellee	Kirkwood
West Stowe	Beecher	Kirkwood
Burua	Burua	Burua

Beecher is a rural locality in the Gladstone Region, Queensland, Australia. In the 2021 census, Beecher had a population of 876 people.

== Geography ==
The Calliope River forms the western boundary of the locality. Clyde Creek flows through the locality from the south towards the north-west where it flows into the Calliope River at the most north-western part of the locality. The residential and farming mainly occurs on the lower land (0–10 metres above sea level) surrounding the creek. The Dawson Highway and the Moura railway line also passes from north to south through the locality in this lower-lying area.

The land in the east of the suburb is hillier (rising to 130 metres) and is protected as the Mount Maurice State Forest. Mount Beecher (156 metres) in the south-west of the locality, much of which is protected as the Beecher State Forest.

== History ==
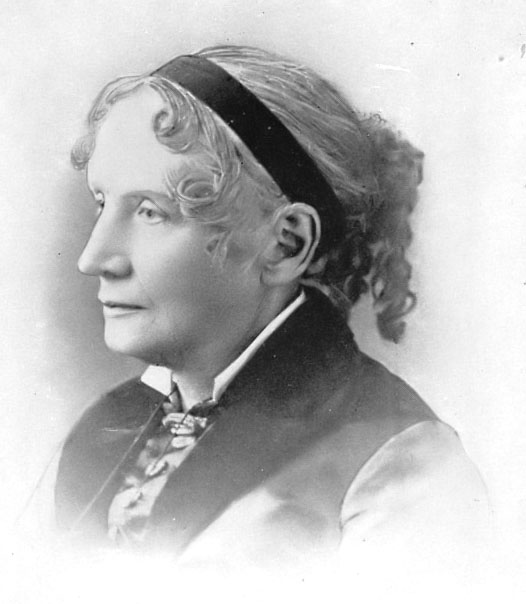
Harriet Beecher Stowe

Beecher is named after Mount Beecher, which was named in 1853 by surveyor Francis MacCabe apparently after Harriet Beecher Stowe, author of the novel Uncle Tom's Cabin. McCabe also named Mount Tom and Mount Stowe in the same area.

Calliope River State School opened on 11 August 1874 and closed in December 1881. Calliope River Provisional School on 1 November 1882 and closed in 1893. Calliope River Provisional School opened in 1897 but closed in 1905. Calliope River State School opened on 27 May 1912, it was renamed Beecher State School in 1919, and closed on 4 July 1943.

The locality was served by the Beecher railway station (23.9009°S 151.2046°E) on the Moura railway line, but the station is now abandoned.

== Demographics ==
In the 2016 census, Beecher had a population of 863 people.

In the 2021 census, Beecher had a population of 876 people.

== Education ==
There are no schools in Beecher. The nearest government school is Clinton State School in Clinton to the north. The nearest government secondary schools are Gladstone State High School in West Gladstone to the north and Toolooa State High School in South Gladstone to the north-east.
