= Gladstone–Mount Larcom Road =

Road in Queensland, Australia

Gladstone–Mount Larcom Road Queensland

General information
- Type: Rural road
- Length: 32.1 km (20 mi)
- Route number(s): State Route 58 (Gladstone Central – Mount Larcom)

Major junctions
- East end: Dawson Highway Gladstone Central
- Blain Drive; Red Rover Road; Landing Road; Calliope River Road
- West end: Bruce Highway Mount Larcom

Location(s)
- Major settlements: Callemondah, Yarwun, Aldoga

Gladstone–Mount Larcom Road is a continuous 32.1 kilometres (19.9 mi) road route in the Gladstone region of Queensland, Australia. The route is signed as State Route 58. Gladstone–Mount Larcom Road (number 181) is a state-controlled regional road. As part of State Route 58 it provides an alternate route between Mount Larcom and Benaraby. It is also part of the shortest route from Gladstone to the north of the state.

== Route Description ==
The Gladstone–Mount Larcom Road commences as Glenlyon Street at an intersection with the Dawson Highway in Gladstone Central. It runs north-west, becoming Hanson Road, turning west and then south-west before crossing Auckland Creek into Callemondah. After crossing a branch of Auckland Creek it runs north-west, passing the Gladstone Power Station and crossing the Calliope River and its anabranch, before entering Yarwun.

The road continues north-west as Hanson Road until it comes to an intersection with Landing Road, where it changes to Gladstone–Mount Larcom Road. This soon turns south-west and crosses the railway line as it enters Aldoga. It follows the railway line to the west through Aldoga and then parallels it north-west along the south-western boundary before meeting the Bruce Highway in Mount Larcom. Targinnie lies just north of the road, and West Stowe lies to the south. Land uses along this road include residential, industrial and rural, including some areas of native vegetation.

== State Route 58 ==
State Route 58 follows a number of separately named roads from Benaraby to Gladstone, and from Gladstone to Mount Larcom. It is a slightly longer alternative to the Bruce Highway. It leaves the Bruce Highway at Benaraby and follows the Gladstone–Benaraby Road north. In South Gladstone it turns west on Philip Street and then north on Glenlyon Road, which soon becomes Glenlyon Street. It passes the north-eastern end of the Dawson Highway in Gladstone Central and then turns west as Hanson Road. This runs generally west until it reaches Yarwun, where it changes to Gladstone–Mount Larcom Road, which continues south-west, west, and north-west until it reaches the Bruce Highway at Mount Larcom.

== Road condition ==
Gladstone–Mount Larcom Road is fully sealed. It has a distance of about 890 metres (970 yd) with an incline greater than 5%.

== History ==
The area where Gladstone now stands was the site of a short-lived convict settlement in 1847. In 1853 a new town was surveyed, and the next year a government agent was appointed, resulting in an influx of free settlers as land became available throughout the region. The first school opened in 1861, and the town became a Municipality in 1863. Development was slow until 1893 when a meatworks was established. The railway line arrived in 1897.

In January 1854, the New South Wales government proclaimed two new districts: Port Curtis (based on Gladstone) and Leichhardt (later renamed Fitzroy, based on Rockhampton). This released vast amounts of good grazing land for selection. Pastoral runs were soon taken up in these areas, leading to the cutting of tracks suitable for wheeled vehicles from the commercial centres to the properties. One such track was the forerunner of the Dawson Highway, while others formed the basis of what eventually became the Bruce Highway. Until the forerunner of the Gladstone–Mount Larcom Road was built, with its four bridges, the shortest route from Gladstone to Mount Larcom was via Calliope, about 30 kilometres (19 miles) further than the current route.

Mount Larcom pastoral run was established as a sheep station in 1855, and the Targinia run, in Targinnie to the east, opened in 1863 and became a fruit farm, later adding sheep to its products. After several years of armed conflict with Aboriginal people, closer settlement began in the Mount Larcom district, with the first school opening in 1882. The railway line from Gladstone to Rockhampton opened in 1903, and schools were opened in Targinnie and Yarwun in 1902 and 1906 respectively.

Both before and after the arrival of the railway there was a growing demand for a more direct and more reliable road connection to Gladstone. This was eventually achieved with the opening of the initial version of the Gladstone–Mount Larcom Road.

== Major intersections ==
All distances are from Google Maps. The entire road is in the Gladstone local government area.

Location	km	mi	Destinations	Notes
Gladstone Central	0	0.0	Dawson Highway – southwest – West Gladstone, Calliope; Glenlyon Street – southeast – South Gladstone; Bramston Street – northeast – Gladstone CBD	Eastern end of Gladstone–Mount Larcom Road (State Route 58). Road runs north-west as Glenlyon Street.
Gladstone Central	0.4	0.25	Roseberry Street – northeast – Gladstone CBD	Road name changes to Hanson Road
Callemondah	3.3	2.1	Blain Drive – south – West Gladstone, Dawson Highway; Alf O'Rourke Drive – north – Gladstone Marina	
Callemondah	3.9	2.4	Red Rover Road – south – Clinton, Dawson Highway	
Callemondah	4.6– 5.1	2.9– 3.2	Power Station entry road – south – Gladstone Power Station	
Yarwun	12.3	7.6	Landing Road – north – Fishermans Landing	Road name changes to Gladstone–Mount Larcom Road
Yarwun	16.3	10.1	Calliope River Road – southeast – West Stowe, Calliope, Bruce Highway; Targinnie Road – north – Targinnie	
Mount Larcom	32.1	19.9	Bruce Highway – northwest – Raglan, Rockhampton – southeast – Calliope, Benaraby, Miriam Vale	Western end of Gladstone–Mount Larcom Road (State Route 58).
1.000 mi = 1.609 km; 1.000 km = 0.621 mi: Route transition

== See also ==
- List of road routes in Queensland
- List of numbered roads in Queensland
