= Burua =

- Suburb
- Interactive map of Burua
- Coordinates: 23.9444°S 151.2069°E
- Country: Australia
- State: Queensland
- LGA: Gladstone Region
- Location: 8.4 km (5.2 mi) N of Calliope; 14.9 km (9.3 mi) SW of Gladstone CBD; 537 km (334 mi) NNW of Brisbane

Government
  - State electorates: Gladstone; Callide
  - Federal division: Flynn

Area
  - Total: 43.6 km^{2} (16.8 sq mi)

Population
  - Total: 849 (2021 census)
  - Density: 19.47/km^{2} (50.43/sq mi)
- Time zone: UTC+10:00 (AEST)
- Postcode: 4680
Suburbs around Burua
West Stowe	Beecher	Kirkwood; O'Connell
West Stowe	Burua	Wurdong Heights
River Ranch	Calliope	Calliope

Burua is a rural locality in the Gladstone Region, Queensland, Australia. In the 2021 census, Burua had a population of 849 people.

== Geography ==
The Calliope River forms the western boundary.

The Bruce Highway passes through the south-west corner, and the Dawson Highway runs through from north to south.

== History ==
Clyde Creek Provisional School opened on 16 October 1882. On 1 January 1909, it became Clyde Creek State School. In 1911 it was renamed Burua State School. It closed in 1925.

Cockeye Scrub Provisional School opened on 16 February 1925, being renamed Burua West Provisional School on 6 March 1925, and then Theresa Provisional School on 8 September 1927. On 1 April 1931, it became Theresa State School. It closed permanently on 31 December 1940.

Faith Baptist Christian School opened in 1998.

== Demographics ==
In the 2016 census Burua had a population of 774 people.

In the 2021 census, Burua had a population of 849 people.

== Education ==
Faith Baptist Christian School is a private primary and secondary (Prep-12) school for boys and girls at 1315 Dawson Highway (23.9361°S 151.2199°E). In 2018, the school had an enrolment of 69 students with 7 teachers and 14 non-teaching staff (10 full-time equivalent). In 2024, the school had an enrolment of 113 students with 11 teachers and 16 non-teaching staff.

There are no government schools in Burua. The nearest government primary schools are Calliope State School in neighbouring Calliope to the south, Clinton State School in Clinton to the north, and Kin Kora State School in Kin Kora to the north. The nearest government secondary schools are Calliope State High School in Calliope, Gladstone State High School in West Gladstone to the north, and Toolooa State High School in South Gladstone to the north-east.
