= Aldoga, Queensland =

Aldoga
- Suburb
- Interactive map of Aldoga
- Coordinates: 23.8425°S 151.0586°E
- Country: Australia
- State: Queensland
- LGA: Gladstone Region
- Location: 7.8 km (4.8 mi) SE of Mount Larcom; 24.0 km (14.9 mi) W of Gladstone CBD; 83.7 km (52.0 mi) SE of Rockhampton; 551 km (342 mi) NNW of Brisbane

Government
  - State electorate: Gladstone
  - Federal division: Flynn

Area
  - Total: 82.1 km^{2} (31.7 sq mi)

Population
  - Total: 0 (2021 census)
  - Density: 0.000/km^{2} (0.000/sq mi)
- Time zone: UTC+10:00 (AEST)
- Postcode: 4694
Suburbs around Aldoga
Mount Larcom	Targinnie	Targinnie
East End	Aldoga	Yarwun
East End	West Stowe	West Stowe

Aldoga is a rural locality in the Gladstone Region, Queensland, Australia. In the 2021 census, Aldoga had "no people or a very low population".

== Geography ==
The Gladstone–Mount Larcom Road runs through from east to west.

== History ==
The name Aldoga is believed to be an Aboriginal word meaning "wild duck".

== Demographics ==
In the 2016 census, Aldoga had "no people or a very low population".

In the 2021 census, Aldoga had "no people or a very low population".

== Education ==
There are no scholos in Mount Larcom. The nearest government primary schools are Mount Larcom State School in neighbouring Mount Larcom to the north-west and Yarwun State School in neighbouring Yarwun to the east. The nearest government secondary schools are Mount Larcom State School (to Year 10), Gladstone State High School (to Year 12) in West Gladstone to the east, and Calliope State High School in Calliope to the south-east.
