= Kirkwood, Queensland =

Kirkwood
- Suburb
- Interactive map of Kirkwood
- Coordinates: 23.8986°S 151.2377°E
- Country: Australia
- State: Queensland
- LGA: Gladstone Region
- Location: 7.7 km (4.8 mi) S of West Gladstone; 9.4 km (5.8 mi) SSW of South Gladstone; 10 km (6.2 mi) S of Gladstone Central; 115 km (71 mi) SE of Rockhampton; 515 km (320 mi) NNW of Brisbane

Government
  - State electorate: Gladstone
  - Federal division: Flynn

Area
  - Total: 8.5 km^{2} (3.3 sq mi)
- Elevation: 10–130 m (33–427 ft)

Population
  - Total: 2,513 (2021 census)
  - Density: 295.6/km^{2} (766/sq mi)
- Time zone: UTC+10:00 (AEST)
- Postcode: 4680
Suburbs around Kirkwood
Byellee; Clinton	New Auckland	Telina
Beecher	Kirkwood	Glen Eden
Burua	Burua	O'Connell

Kirkwood is a semi-rural locality in the Gladstone Region, Queensland, Australia. In the 2021 census, Kirkwood had a population of 2,513 people.

== Geography ==
The locality is bounded to the north by Kirkwood Road and to the east by Auckland Creek. Situated on the southern edge of the urban development of the city of Gladstone, small pockets of residential development have been established in the north of the locality. As at December 2020, most of the locality is undeveloped and used for grazing. However, real estate businesses are describing it as "Gladstone's newest suburb" and anticipate rapid residential growth.

O'Connell Ridges is a mountain range (23.9373°S 151.2455°E) that commences in Beecher, passes through the south of Kirkwood, into Burua and ends in Wurdong Heights. The elevation of Kirkwood ranges from 10 metres (33 ft) above sea level in the north-east of the locality through to 130 metres (430 ft) in the south of the locality.

== History ==
The suburb was named after a notable Gladstone family at the suggestion of the Gladstone City Council.

== Demographics ==
In the 2016 census, Kirkwood had a population of 2,250 people.

In the 2021 census, Kirkwood had a population of 2,513 people.

== Education ==
There are no schools in Kirkwood. The nearest government primary schools are Clinton State School in neighbouring Clinton to the north-west and Kin Kora State School in Kin Kora to the north-east. The nearest government secondary schools are Gladstone State High School in West Gladstone to the north and Toolooa State High School in South Gladstone to the north-east.

== Amenities ==
Kirkwood Shopping Centre is at 505 Kirkwood Road (corner of Dixon Drive, 23.8957°S 151.2455°E).

There are a number of parks in the area:

- Little Creek Parklands on Little Boulevarde (23.8931°S 151.2205°E)
- Koowin Drive Park (23.8929°S 151.2390°E)
- Gladstone Mountain Bike Park at the southern end of Koowin Road (23.9120°S 151.2489°E)

Gladstone Mountain Bike Park has 36 mountain biking trails, a total of 27 kilometres (17 mi), at different degrees of difficulty.
