= New Auckland =

- Suburb
- Interactive map of New Auckland
- Coordinates: 23.8836°S 151.2366°E
- Country: Australia
- State: Queensland
- City: Gladstone
- LGA: Gladstone Region
- Location: 8.2 km (5.1 mi) S of Gladstone Central; 114 km (71 mi) SE of Rockhampton; 511 km (318 mi) NNW of Brisbane

Government
  - State electorate: Gladstone
  - Federal division: Flynn

Area
  - Total: 3.7 km^{2} (1.4 sq mi)

Population
  - Total: 5,266 (2021 census)
  - Density: 1,423/km^{2} (3,690/sq mi)
- Time zone: UTC+10:00 (AEST)
- Postcode: 4680
Suburbs around New Auckland
Clinton	West Gladstone	Kin Kora
Clinton	New Auckland	Telina
Kirkwood	Kirkwood	Glen Eden

New Auckland is an urban locality in Gladstone in the Gladstone Region, Queensland, Australia. In the 2021 census, New Auckland had a population of 5,266 people.

It is on the outskirts of the Gladstone urban area, but, as at December 2020, is experiencing high levels of suburban development.

== Geography ==
New Auckland is bounded to the north by the Dawson Highway and to the south by Kirkwood Road. It is bounded to the east by Auckland Creek and to the west by Briffney Creek. The land use is suburban residential. The Moura railway line passes through the north-east corner of the suburb.

== History ==
This suburb was named in December 1988, taking its name from the housing estate name, which takes its name from Auckland Creek, which takes its name in turn from the ship Lord Auckland. The ship was a barque of 516 gross tons, chartered by the New South Wales Government which carried some of the settlers to the first settlement of Gladstone site, which stranded on a shoal entering Gladstone Harbour on 25 January 1847.

== Demographics ==
In the 2011 census, New Auckland had a population of 4,711 people.

In the 2016 census, New Auckland had a population of 5,085 people.

In the 2021 census, New Auckland had a population of 5,266 people.

== Education ==
There are no schools in New Auckland. The nearest government primary schools are Clinton State School in neighbouring Clinton to the west and Kin Kora State School in neighbouring Kin Kora to the north-east. The nearest government secondary schools are Gladstone State High School in West Gladstone to the north-east and Toolooa State High School in Toolooa to the east.
