= Byellee, Queensland =

Byellee
- Suburb
- Interactive map of Byellee
- Coordinates: 23.8724°S 151.1966°E
- Country: Australia
- State: Queensland
- City: Gladstone
- LGA: Gladstone Region
- Location: 8.8 km (5.5 mi) SW of Gladstone CBD; 110 km (68 mi) SE of Rockhampton; 539 km (335 mi) NNW of Brisbane

Government
  - State electorate: Gladstone
  - Federal division: Flynn

Area
  - Total: 4.1 km^{2} (1.6 sq mi)

Population
  - Total: 0 (2021 census)
  - Density: 0.00/km^{2} (0.00/sq mi)
- Time zone: UTC+10:00 (AEST)
- Postcode: 4680
Suburbs around Byellee
Yarwun	Callemondah	Callemondah
West Stowe	Byellee	Clinton
West Stowe	Beecher	Kirkwood

Byellee is an industrial suburb of Gladstone in the Gladstone Region, Queensland, Australia. In the 2021 census, Byellee had "no people or a very low population".

== Geography ==
The suburb is bounded to the west and north by the Calliope River, to the east by Don Young Drive, to the south-east by the Dawson Highway, and to the south by Clyde Creek, a tributary of the Calliope River.

In the north of the locality is an unnamed and undeveloped island, which is largely marshland (23.85879°S 151.18187°E).

The North Coast railway line enters the locality from the north-east (Callemondah) and exits to west (West Stowe) crossing the river on two railway bridges. The suburb is served by the Byellee railway siding (23.8695°S 151.1988°E).

The Moura railway line also passes through the suburb, entering from the north-west (Callemondah) and exits to the south (Beecher).

There is a major overhead electric power transmission corridor (23.87982°S 151.20156°E) from the Gladstone Power Station in Callemondah which passes through Byellee from the north-east to the south (Kirkwood).

Most of the west and south-west of the locality is marshland and is within the Byellee Wildlife Reserve (23.88180°S 151.19707°E), an environmentally-significant area for bird species.

Most of the land use is railway corridors, electricity corridors and the wildlife reserve, with the remainder being either undeveloped land or land used for grazing on native vegetation.

== History ==
The suburb takes its name from the corrupted pronunciation of name of an Aboriginal clan resident on Curtis Island and the mainland north of the Calliope River. Byellee was used as an alternative to Boyne Valley during World War II by the Queensland Railways Department.

== Demographics ==
In the 2016 census, Byellee had "no people or a very low population".

In the 2021 census, Byellee had "no people or a very low population".

== Education ==
There are no schools in Byellee. The nearest government primary school is Clinton State School in neighbouring Clinton to the east. The nearest government secondary school is Gladstone State High School in West Gladstone to the east. There are numerous non-government schools in Gladstone and its suburbs.
