= Our Lady Star of the Sea Church & School =

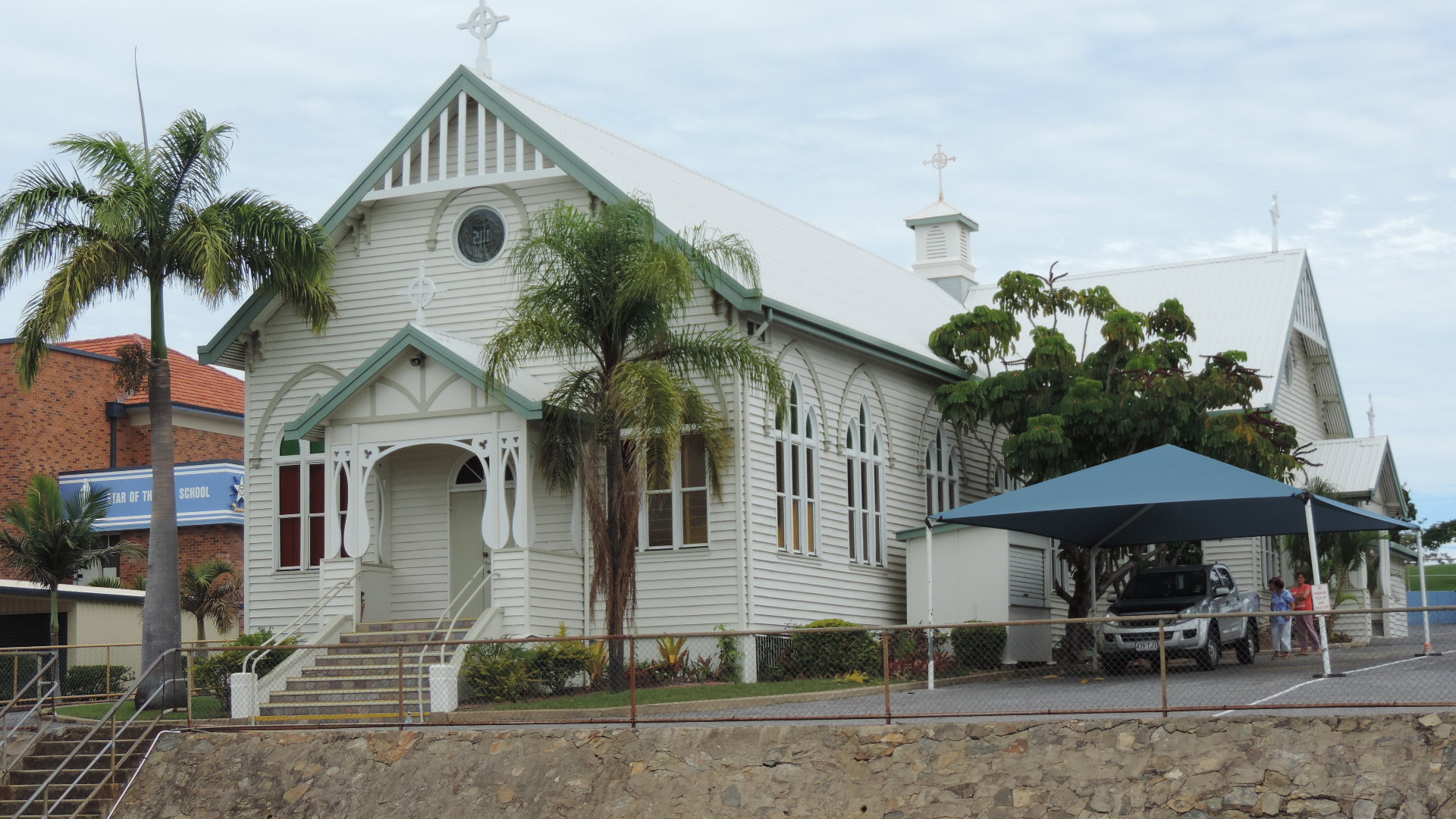
- Our Lady Star of the Sea Catholic Church (view from Goondoon St), 2014

- Location within Queensland Location within Australia
- 23.8479°S 151.258°E
- Location: Goondoon Street, Gladstone, Gladstone Region, Queensland, Australia

History
- Design period: 1919–1930s (interwar period)
- Built: 1924–1950

Queensland Heritage Register
- Official name: Our Lady Star of the Sea Church & School
- Type: state heritage (built)
- Designated: 21 October 1992
- Reference no.: 600521
- Significant period: 1924, 1938, 1949–1950 (fabric)
- Significant components: stained glass window/s, school/school room, furniture/fittings, church, wall/s - retaining

Our Lady Star of the Sea Church & School is a heritage-listed Roman Catholic church and school at Goondoon Street, Gladstone, Gladstone Region, Queensland, Australia. It was built from 1924 to 1950. It was added to the Queensland Heritage Register on 21 October 1992.

== History ==
Our Lady Star of the Sea church at Gladstone was erected in 1924. The adjacent school was built in 1950, replacing a 1902 building destroyed in the cyclone of 1949.

Following an abortive attempt to establish a settlement at Port Curtis in 1847, the township of Gladstone was surveyed in 1853 and by January 1854, Sir Maurice O'Connell was installed as the Government Resident, Police Magistrate and Commissioner of Crown Lands. Although there was pressure from pastoralists to open up the Port Curtis District, northern agitation for the separation of Queensland from New South Wales was mounting and the New South Wales government may have hoped to establish a more northerly potential capital than Brisbane for the new colony. In February 1854 the first land sales of Gladstone town and suburban land were held in Sydney. Although the Catholic presence in the Gladstone district was not large at the time, the Catholic Primate of Australia, (the Archbishop of Sydney Bede Polding) bought a number of allotments on Auckland Hill in these sales. Bishop James Quinn, Queensland's first Roman Catholic Bishop, visited Gladstone in 1868 and encouraged the formulation of plans for a church. The land purchased by Polding was very steep and in 1870 land was acquired between Auckland Streets and Oaka Lane for a church and in Rosebery Street for a convent/primary school. St Mary's School opened in 1871, staffed by Sisters of the Order of St Joseph, and served for some years as a church also. In 1879 the Sisters were withdrawn from Queensland and in the 1880s and 1890s Catholic pupils were educated at a school run by Mrs Annie Breslin at her residence in Goondoon Street.

St Mary's Church was opened in January 1874 on the Auckland Street land acquired in 1870 but without a resident priest. For many years, its congregation was served by visiting priests, mainly from Rockhampton. In 1882 the Diocese of Rockhampton was established under the Right Reverend Dr John Cani, the first Bishop, and the first resident priest was appointed to Gladstone in 1885.

By the turn of the century, the coastal railway was being extended to Gladstone, bringing an increase in population to the town. In 1901, responsibility for the Catholic parish at Gladstone was transferred from the Diocese of Rockhampton to the Marist Fathers. In the same year, the church land at Auckland Street was resumed for railway purposes and a new site was purchased covering two acres bounded by Goondoon Street, Herbert Street and Glenlyon Road and overlooking the harbour. The new site was intended for the building of a church, school, convent and presbytery.

The new church school, designed by Architects Eaton and Bates, opened in January 1902 staffed by three Sisters of Mercy from Rockhampton. They were housed temporarily in a cottage in Rosebery Street until the convent, a timber building, was completed in June 1902. In September the new presbytery was completed, a two-storey timber building erected at Dean Murlay's own expense and known as Villa Maria.

To serve the projected needs of the parish more fully, the Right Reverend Dr Joseph Shiel, Bishop of Rockhampton, laid the foundation stone of a larger new church on 13 April 1924. This was erected adjacent to the 1902 church school and was officially opened on 16 November 1924 at a cost of £2700. The older building continued to function as a school.

In the second half of the 1930s, Gladstone experienced renewed economic and population growth following the 1935 takeover of Gladstone Meatworks by the American company Swifts, which increased production. In 1936 fundraising to enlarge the church commenced and the extensions were opened in 1938. In the early 1940s, plans to raise the school and to construct brick classrooms underneath were formulated, but did not eventuate as a bequest of £4,000 enabled the parish to plan for a new school. About 1943, the Brisbane architect Frank Cullen was commissioned to prepare plans for a school to accommodate 300 pupils. Cullen was an articled pupil of Hennessy, Hennessy and Co in Brisbane and Sydney 1928–1933. He worked for some time for the Queensland Government and was registered as an architect in 1935.

Wartime building restrictions prevented the implementation of plans and not until 1947 was a building permit granted. By this time the plan had been modified to accommodate a further 100 children, necessary because of the strong growth in the Gladstone Meatworks at this period. The contract was let to Young and Sons of Bundaberg for a price of £18,922. When work on the new school had only just begun, the 1902 school and convent buildings were destroyed in the cyclone that struck Gladstone on 2 March 1949. Throughout 1949–50 Our Lady Star of the Sea School was located temporarily at the Town Hall, Our Lady Star of the Sea Church and in two pavilions in the show grounds. Archbishop James Duhig officially opened the new school on 20 April 1950. The three- storey brick building, which included a basement assembly hall, library, 16 millimetres (0.63 in) projector for "visual education" and a public address system on all three levels, was considered one of the most modern school buildings in Queensland. The new convent was completed in 1952.

Gladstone experienced a boom in the second half of the 1960s with the opening of the Gladstone powerhouse, bauxite refinery and alumina smelter and rapid expansion of farming and grazing in the Dawson and Callide Valleys. Between 1965 and 1970 a number of changes were made to Our Lady Star of the Sea complex including the closing of Central Lane between the convent and presbytery on one side and the church and school on the other. Retaining walls were erected in front of the Convent and Presbytery, a parking area and basketball court bitumen coated and the sanctuary and church remodeled in line with the provisions laid down by the Second Vatican Council. These included cutting down the altar rails and the converting the altar into a table form.

In 1966 the Gladstone Catholic High School began as a small class conducted underneath the presbytery and in 1967 the Stella Maris College for girls opened in West Gladstone staffed by the Sisters of Mercy. In the following year a boys' school, Chanel College, was established at the new location and staffed by the Marist Brothers. The two Colleges opened as Gladstone Catholic High School on 21 April 1968.

In the late 1960s the Marist Sisters were invited to Gladstone to staff the convent school and in 1971, the first extension to the Star of the Sea Primary School was opened, the Marist Sisters taking over around 1972. Further extensions to the school were blessed in 1981.

In July 1982, Villa Maria, the presbytery, was demolished and in 1983 the Sisters of Mercy moved into a new convent in Morley Street.

== Description ==
The Our Lady Star of the Sea church and school complex is situated in an elevated position overlooking the harbour at Gladstone. The ground falls away below the eastern side of the church and school and is supported by a stone retaining wall, which separates it from the large playground on the lower level and gives visual prominence to the eastern elevation of the church.

The church is a Gothic influenced timber building, cruciform in plan, with gabled porches featuring decorative timber posts at the north, south and eastern arms. There is also an entry on the southern side. The foundations of the church are concrete and the gabled roof has a modern metal cladding with a louvred fleche at the crossing. The roof ends and porches are topped by timber Celtic crosses. The church has an octagonal sanctuary lit with two sets of triple lancet windows and two single lancet windows set with stained glass. There is a large sacristy to each side of the sanctuary. All windows are triple lancets in aluminium frames beneath arched drip moulds. A marble foundation stone is located at the base of the eastern elevation.

The school is constructed of light red brick with a tiled roof. It has been constructed in three phases, the earliest of which is to the east and is three stories high. This first section is distinct from the additions and is the part of the school considered to have heritage significance. It has a hipped roof and features brick balconies and a tower containing the stair well, which s lit by glass panels. A marble foundation stone is also located in the stairwell tower on the eastern side. The extensions are sympathetic in form to the original school buildings and are two storeys high. They consist of a central section built in the 1970s and the section closest to the park was built in 1981.

== Heritage listing ==
Our Lady Star of the Sea Church & School was listed on the Queensland Heritage Register on 21 October 1992 having satisfied the following criteria.

The place is important in demonstrating the evolution or pattern of Queensland's history.

The church and school of Our Lady Star of the Sea illustrate the development of Gladstone and the Roman Catholic Church in Queensland. The church is the only one in Gladstone that survived the 1949 cyclone and is now the only early building on this site. When the earliest section of the school was completed in 1949 it was said to have been the most modern in Queensland. This reflects the development that was taking place in Gladstone at the time and the confidence of the church in the future of Catholic education in the area.

The place is important because of its aesthetic significance.

Both buildings are prominently sited and in form, scale and materials make an important contribution to the built character of Gladstone.

The place has a strong or special association with a particular community or cultural group for social, cultural or spiritual reasons.

Both buildings have a strong connection with the Roman Catholic community of Gladstone and the surrounding area over several generations. The school is probably a major work of Frank Cullen, the architect. The architect of the church is unknown.
