= Barney Point, Queensland =

Barney Point
- Suburb
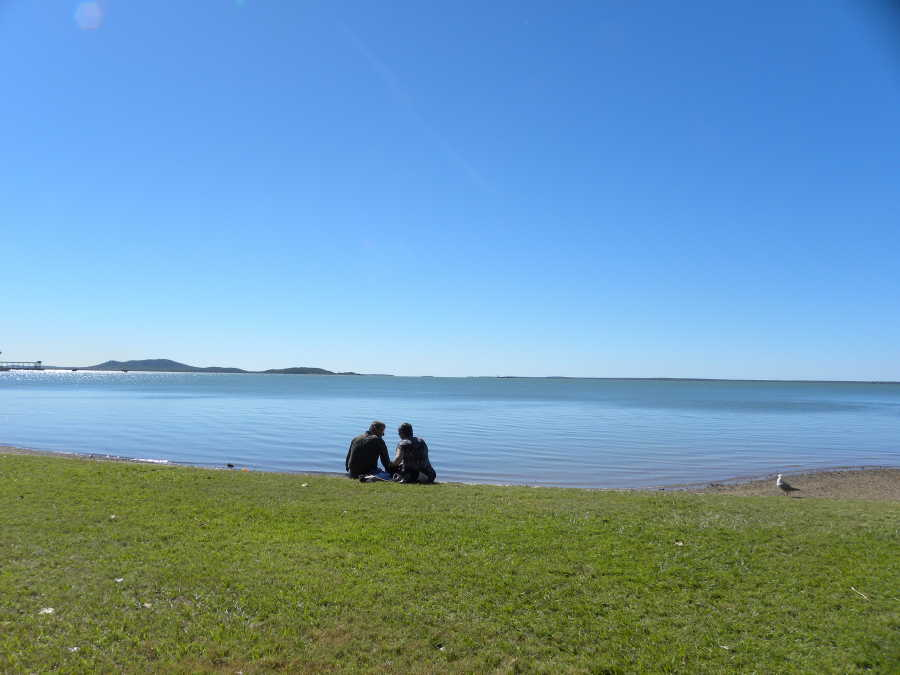
- Barney Point Beach, 2012

- Interactive map of Barney Point
- Coordinates: 23.8463°S 151.2663°E
- Country: Australia
- State: Queensland
- City: Gladstone
- LGA: Gladstone Region
- Location: 3.5 km (2.2 mi) SE of Gladstone CBD; 111 km (69 mi) SE of Rockhampton; 535 km (332 mi) NNW of Brisbane

Government
  - State electorate: Gladstone
  - Federal division: Flynn

Area
  - Total: 5.1 km^{2} (2.0 sq mi)

Population
  - Total: 1,065 (2021 census)
  - Density: 208.8/km^{2} (541/sq mi)
- Time zone: UTC+10:00 (AEST)
- Postcode: 4680
Suburbs around Barney Point
Callemondah	Gladstone Harbour	Gladstone Harbour
Gladstone Central	Barney Point	Gladstone Harbour
South Gladstone	South Trees	South Trees

Barney Point is a beachside suburb of Gladstone in the Gladstone Region, Queensland, Australia. In the 2021 census, Barney Point had a population of 1,065 people.

== Geography ==
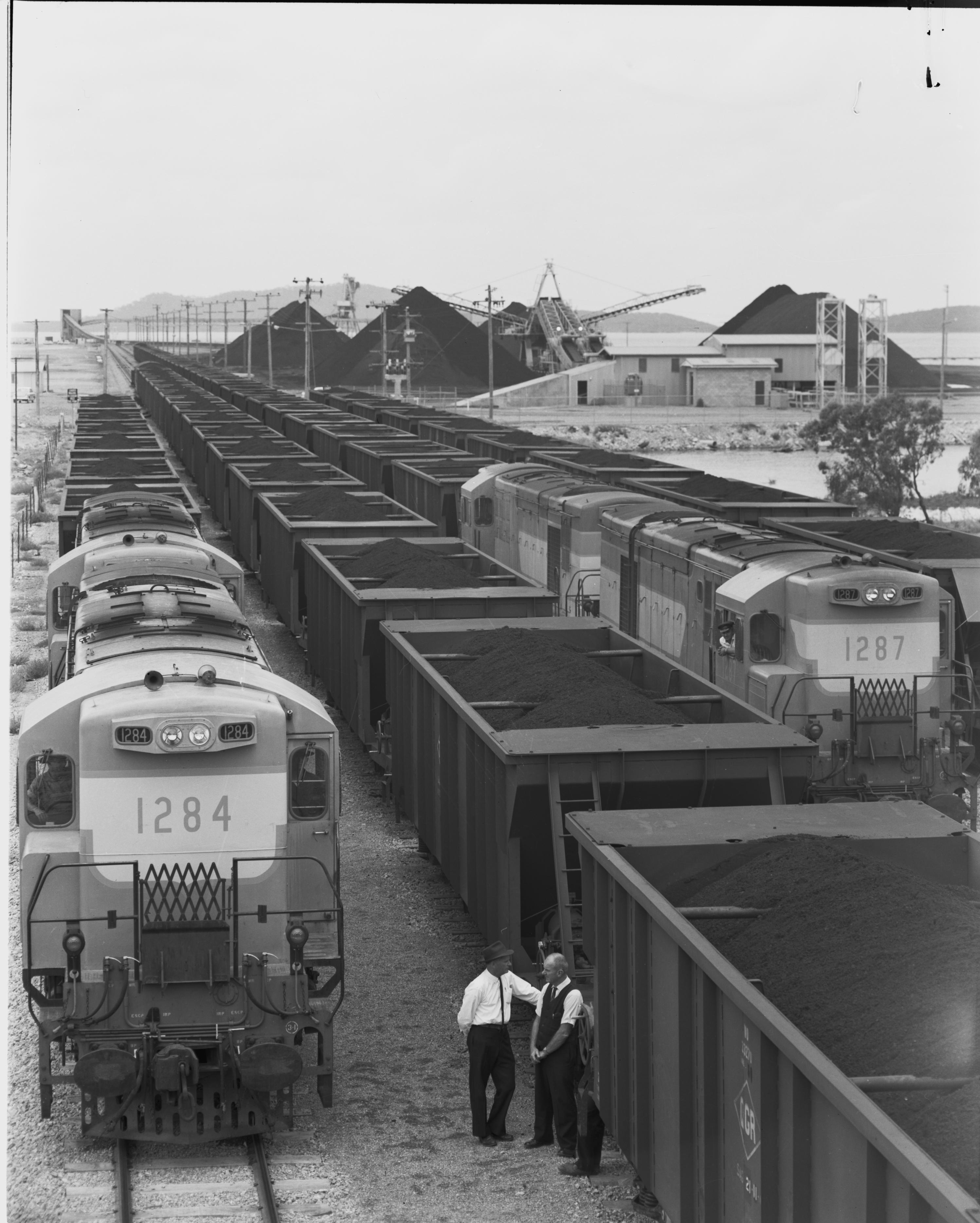
Barney Point coal terminal, Gladstone, ccira 1966

Barney Point is bounded by the Coral Sea to the north and east and the North Coast railway line to the Port of Gladstone on the west. The northern part of the suburb is industrial, being port facilities. The southern part of the suburb is residential with a sandy beach and parkland by the sea.

There are four railway stations in the suburb on North Coast line serving the port area:

- South Gladstone railway station (23.8578°S 151.2701°E)
- Barney Point railway station (23.8455°S 151.2708°E)
- Gladstone railway station (23.8465°S 151.2631°E)
- Auckland Point railway station (23.8327°S 151.2576°E)

Gladstone railway station is the only station that is a passenger stop.

== History ==
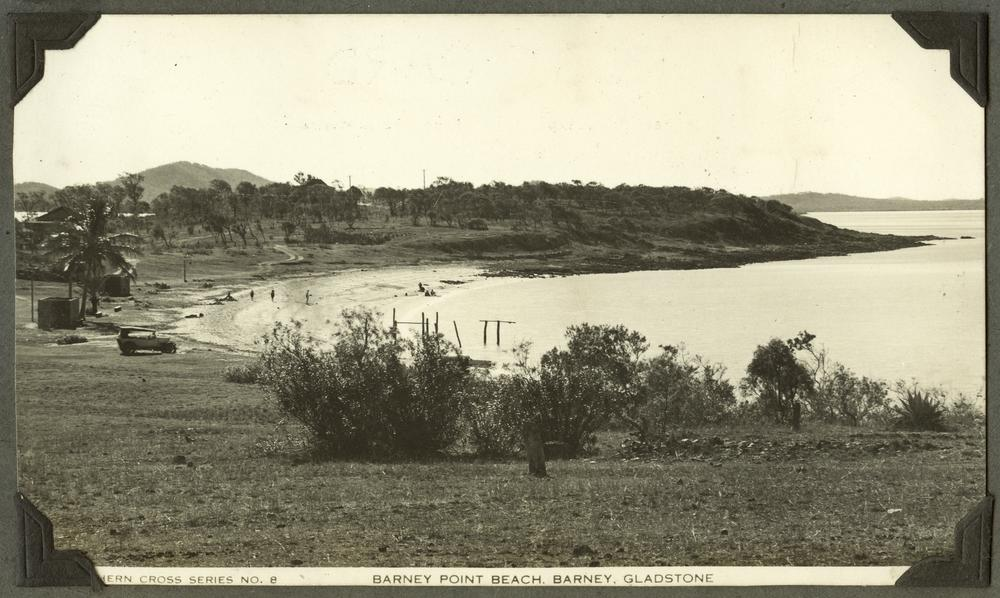
Beach at Barney Point Beach, circa 1937

The area takes its name from the local headland Barney Point, which in turn was named in honour of George Barney (1792-1862), a soldier and engineer, and Lieutenant Governor of the Colony of North Australia 1846-1847.

Barney Point is associated with the early history of the settlement of the Gladstone area. Friend Park in Barney Point was the site of the former Port Curtis Government Residence and Domain, established in 1854–56. The former residence was constructed for, and occupied by, Captain Maurice Charles O'Connell, who in 1854 was appointed Government Resident, Police Magistrate, and Commissioner of Crown Lands for the Port Curtis and Leichhardt districts of New South Wales (the separation of Queensland did not occur until 1859). The Domain was laid out in mid-1854, and a stone residence was completed by the end of 1856.

A post office was opened on 1 September 1954 and closed on 8 March 1966.

== Demographics ==
In the 2011 census, Barney Point had a population of 1,156 people.

In the 2016 census, Barney Point had a population of 1,093 people.

In the 2021 census, Barney Point had a population of 1,065 people.

== Heritage listings ==
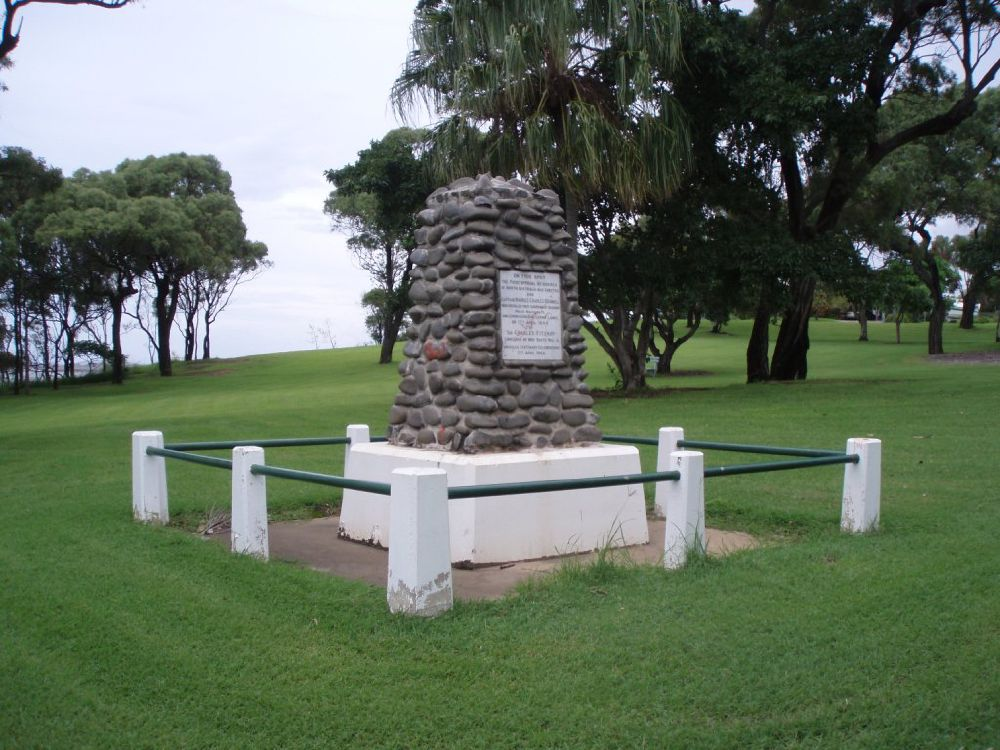
Friend Park, 2009

Barney Point has a number of heritage-listed sites, including:

- Friend Park, Friend Street (23.8493°S 151.275°E)

== Education ==
There are no schools in Barney Point. The nearest government primary schools are Gladstone Central State School in the neighbouring suburb of Gladstone Central to the west and Gladstone South State School in neighbouring South Gladstone to the south-west. The nearest government secondary schools are Gladstone State High School in West Gladstone approximately 2 kilometres (1.2 mi) away to the west and Toolooa State High School in South Gladstone. There are also a number of private schools in Gladstone and its suburbs.

== Attractions ==
The Gladstone Maritime Museum presents maritime history of Port Curtis and the discovery, exploration and settlement of the region. It is located at 1 Francis Ward Drive (23.83413°S 151.26055°E).

== Amenities ==
The Yaralla Sports Club at the corner of Bell and Wood Streets (23.85560°S 151.27144°E) was first established in 1966 and provides sporting facilities, meals and entertainment. There is an on-site hotel. The club provides training and apprenticeships in tourism and hospitality through the Central Queensland Tourism and Hospitality Academy.
