= River Ranch, Queensland =

River Ranch
- Suburb
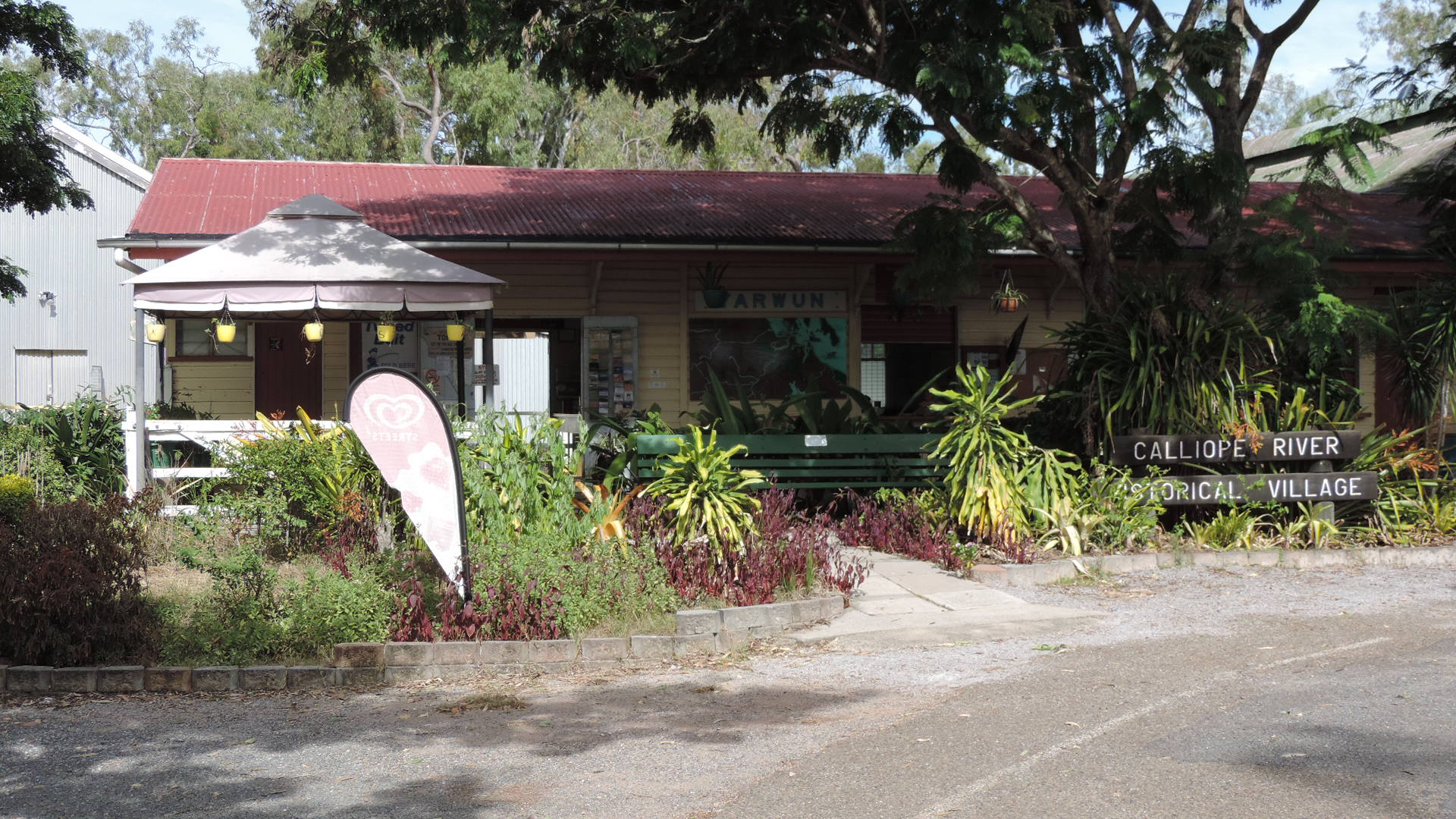
- Calliope River Historical Village kiosk (in the former Yarwun railway station), 2014

- Interactive map of River Ranch
- Coordinates: 23.9758°S 151.1575°E
- Country: Australia
- State: Queensland
- LGA: Gladstone Region
- Location: 7.5 km (4.7 mi) NW of Calliope; 27.5 km (17.1 mi) SW of Gladstone CBD; 109 km (68 mi) SE of Rockhampton; 538 km (334 mi) NNW of Brisbane

Government
  - State electorates: Callide; Gladstone
  - Federal division: Flynn

Area
  - Total: 10.7 km^{2} (4.1 sq mi)

Population
  - Total: 269 (2021 census)
  - Density: 25.14/km^{2} (65.1/sq mi)
- Time zone: UTC+10:00 (AEST)
- Postcode: 4680
Suburbs around River Ranch
West Stowe	West Stowe	Burua
West Stowe	River Ranch	Calliope
Calliope	Calliope	Calliope

River Ranch is a rural locality in the Gladstone Region, Queensland, Australia. In the 2021 census, River Ranch had a population of 269 people.

== Geography ==
The Calliope River forms part of the western boundary before flowing through to form part of the eastern boundary. Calliope Crossing is a ford over the river (23.96083°S 151.15500°E).

The Bruce Highway passes through the north of the locality.

== History ==
In 1930, a bridge was built at the Calliope Crossing over the Calliope River to replace the dangerous stone causeway which was under the water and was slimy and dangerous. When the weather was bad, the causeway could not be used, necessitating a 20-mile (32 km) deviation to avoid it. The bridge carried the Bruce Highway until it was rerouted further north and crosses the river at Burua.

The centenary celebrations of the Shire of Calliope in 1979 created a collection of historic material, which led to the establishment of the Port Curtis Historical Society. As a new bridge was being constructed for the Bruce Highway to cross the Calliope River, the diversion of the highway to the new bridge created a parcel of land that the shire proposed to use as a historical village. Following site works, the village commenced operation in 1983 with the arrival of the first building, the Ambrose railway station.

== Demographics ==
In the 2011 census, River Ranch had a population of 313 people.

In the 2016 census, River Ranch had a population of 357 people.

In the 2021 census, River Ranch had a population of 269 people.

== Education ==
There are no schools in River Ranch. The nearest government primary and secondary schools are Calliope State School and Calliope State High School, both in neighbouring Calliope to the south-east.

== Amenities ==
There is a boat ramp via Old Bruce Highway on the north bank of the Calliope River (23.9614°S 151.1549°E). It is managed by the Gladstone Regional Council. It is adjacent to the Old Bruce Highway Fishing Bridge (23.96086°S 151.15509°E), which has been closed to traffic since 2009, but is still accessible for fishing.

== Attractions ==
The Calliope River Historical Village is at 50951 Bruce Highway, but accessed from the Old Bruce Highway where it crosses the Calliope River (23.9591°S 151.1557°E).
