= Callemondah =

- Suburb
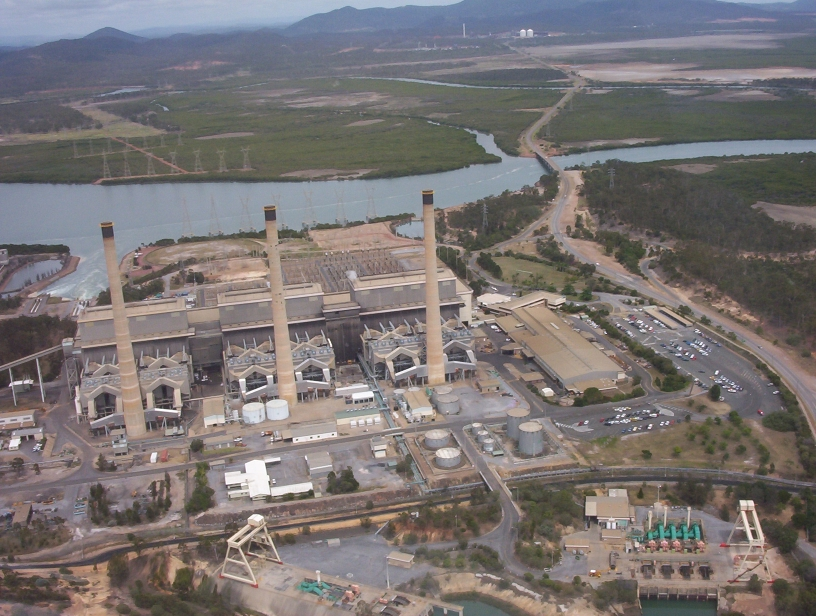
- Gladstone Powerhouse with the Calliope River beyond, 2005

- Interactive map of Callemondah
- Coordinates: 23.8427°S 151.2141°E
- Country: Australia
- State: Queensland
- City: Gladstone
- LGA: Gladstone Region
- Location: 4.3 km (2.7 mi) SW of Gladstone CBD; 106 km (66 mi) SE of Rockhampton; 521 km (324 mi) NNW of Brisbane

Government
  - State electorate: Gladstone
  - Federal division: Flynn

Area
  - Total: 46.5 km^{2} (18.0 sq mi)

Population
  - Total: 30 (2021 census)
  - Density: 0.65/km^{2} (1.67/sq mi)
- Time zone: UTC+10:00 (AEST)
- Postcode: 4680
Suburbs around Callemondah
Yarwun	Curtis Island	Gladstone Harbour
Yarwun	Callemondah	Gladstone Central
Byellee	Clinton	West Gladstone

Callemondah is a coastal suburb of Gladstone in the Gladstone Region, Queensland, Australia. It contains the Port of Gladstone. In the 2021 census, Callemondah had a population of 30 people.

== Geography ==
The Calliope River forms the south-western boundary of the suburb before flowing north through the suburb into the bay (23.8163°S 151.2269°E) of Port Curtis (23.8181°S 151.2556°E). Auckland Inlet (23.8322°S 151.2519°E) forms its eastern boundary separating it from Gladstone Central. Auckland Creek flows into Auckland Inlet (23.8666°S 151.2333°E).

Offshore are the following islands and rocks:

- Mud Island (23.8133°S 151.2261°E)
- Rich Rocks is a rock (23.8184°S 151.2452°E)
- Wiggins Islands is an island group (23.8188°S 151.2186°E)
- an unnamed 3.3044-hectare (8.165-acre) marine island (23.8321°S 151.2184°E)

and the following passages:

- Targinie Channel (23.7940°S 151.1938°E) separating the north of Callemondah and Yarwun from Curtis Island
- Main Channel (23.8031°S 151.2194°E) separating the north-east of Callemondah from Curtis Island
- Clinton Channel (23.8167°S 151.2461°E) passing east of Callemondah into Port Curtis

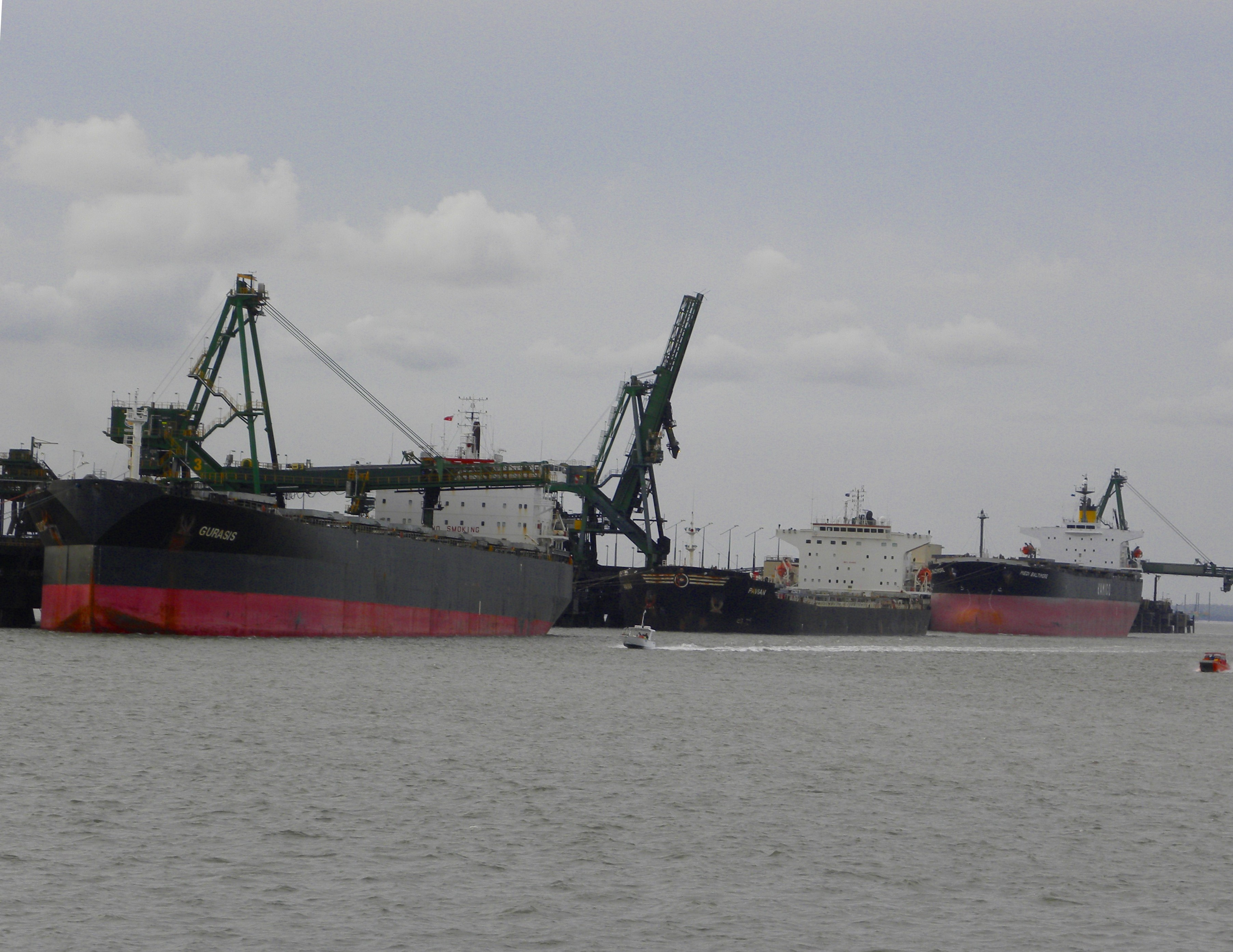
Port of Gladstone, 2010

The land use is predominantly industrial with a number of coal port facilities with associated stockpiles at the Port of Gladstone (23.8202°S 151.2425°E), the NRG Gladstone Powerhouse (23.8516°S 151.2190°E) which is the largest powerhouse in Queensland, railway servicing facilities and numerous other industrial businesses.

The Callemondah railway station and its associated marshalling yards are located on the southern boundary of the suburb (23.8656°S 151.2266°E). It is on the North Coast railway line, the Moura railway line, the Blackwater railway line and a number private rail lines within Callemondah servicing various industrial facilities. Gladstone Power House railway station is on the North Coast line to the immediate east of the Gladstone Powerhouse (23.8537°S 151.2211°E). Clinton railway station (formerly known as Golding railway station) serves the Clinton coal loading wharf in the north of the suburb (23.8285°S 151.2318°E).

== Road infrastructure ==
The Gladstone–Mount Larcom Road runs through from east to west.

== History ==
In January 1847 Colonel George Barney led a settlement party from Sydney to Port Curtis to establish the short-lived Colony of North Australia. They travelled in the 628-ton barque Lord Auckland which was built in Calcutta in 1836. The ship stranded on a shoal in Port Curtis on 25 January 1847, but was refloated and repaired in a creek, now known as Auckland Creek. Auckland Inlet is also named after the barque.

The suburb takes its name from the railway station which was assigned in August 1967 by Queensland Railways Department to their locomotive servicing facility, using an Aboriginal word (probably from a New South Wales area), meaning plenty of hills.

== Demographics ==
In the 2016 census, Callemondah had a population of 18 people.

In the 2021 census, Callemondah had a population of 30 people.

== Education ==
There are no schools in Callemondah. The nearest government primary schools are Gladstone Central State School in neighbouring Gladstone Central to the east and Gladstone West State School in neighbouring West Gladstone to the south-east. The nearest government secondary school is Gladstone State High School in neighbouring West Gladstone to the south-east.

Central Queensland University operates its Gladstone Marina campus on Bryan Jordan Drive in the north-east tip of Callemondah (23.8356°S 151.2487°E), which is linked by a bridge across the Auckland Inlet to Gladstone Central. As the name suggests, the campus is adjacent to the Gladstone Marina.

== Facilities ==
Lake Callemondah is an artificial lake (23.8590°S 151.2324°E) at the end of Joe Joseph Drive. It is adjacent to Auckland Inlet but separated from it by a rock and concrete wall. The lake receives stormwater run-off from the roofs and streets of the local area. In 1999 barramundi fingerlings were first introduced into the lake. As the fish mature, they are able to migrate into Auckland Inlet and beyond. Up to 2,800 new fingerlings are added to the lake each year. By tagging the fish, it has been established most of the mature fish stay in the Gladstone area, but one has been found up 36 kilometres (22 mi) away in the Boyne River.

Calliope River Sewage Treatment Plant is on Hansen Road (23.8450°S 151.2208°E). The treated wastewater is either recycled or discharged into the Calliope River.

== Amenities ==
Gladstone Marina is a 51.4-hectare (127-acre) marina at Alf O'Rourke Drive (23.8307°S 151.2446°E). It has 320 mooring berths. Nearby is a boat ramp and floating walkway (23.8288°S 151.2405°E). It is managed by the Gladstone Ports Corporation Limited.

There is a boat ramp and floating walkway off Hanson Road near the Gladstone Power Station providing access to the Calliope River (23.8466°S 151.2127°E). It is managed by the Gladstone Ports Corporation Limited.

There are a number of parks in the suburb, including:

- Bensted Street Park (23.8571°S 151.2269°E)
- Kymead Park (23.8688°S 151.2334°E)
- Red Rover Road Park (23.8622°S 151.2230°E)

== Attractions ==
Powerhouse Lookout is at the top of Jeff Ringland Drive (23.8554°S 151.2267°E).
