= Chanel College (Gladstone) =

Coordinates: 23°52′04.88″S 151°14′34.46″E

Location
- Paterson Street; Gladstone, Queensland; Gladstone, Queensland, 4680; Australia

Information
- School type: Private high school
- Denomination: Catholic
- Founded: 1966
- Status: Open
- Authority: Catholic Education (Rockhampton Diocese)
- School number: 830
- Principal: Susan Bunkum
- Grades: 7-12

Chanel College is a Catholic co-educational Secondary College in Gladstone, Queensland, Australia. Founded in 1966 by the Sisters of Mercy, the school was originally located at Star of the Sea Catholic Primary School, but moved to 11 Paterson Street as Stella Maris College. The girls were educated at Stella Maris College and the boys at Chanel College, commenced by the Marist Brothers in 1968. Sister Bernadette continued to head Stella Maris and was resident principal of the girls' school, while Brother Austin Tanzer was the principal of Chanel. It was not until a later date, around 1976, that Stella Maris/Chanel College became a fully co-educational school with Brother John as Principal. At this time, it only educated students to Year 10; the year of completion of the Junior Certificate. Students then went on to attend the Gladstone State High School to complete Senior studies. After Brother John left the School, Brother Colin Marstin became Principal around 1978, and together with Brother Gonzaga, and Brother Joachim continued the efforts of the Marist Brother teachings. At this time the school became known as the Gladstone Catholic High School. It was the first Private Secondary school opened to serve Gladstone's youth, it still achieves its purpose. The first year 11 (Senior) class commenced in January 1982 and in November 1983, the first year 12 class from the Gladstone Catholic High School graduated.

== School houses ==
The five school houses are Futuna, Marcellin, McAuley, Stella Maris and MacKillop.

- Marcellin (red) is named after the French priest Marcellin Champagnat, the founder of the Marist Brothers.
- McAuley (blue) is named after Catherine McAuley, foundress of the Sisters of Mercy.
- Futuna (yellow) is named after the island on which Peter Chanel was killed.
- Stella Maris (green) takes its name from the Latin words for Star of the Sea.
- MacKillop (purple) is named after Mary MacKillop, first Australian foundress.
