= Clinton, Queensland =

Clinton
- Town
- Interactive map of Clinton
- Coordinates: 23.8748°S 151.2177°E
- Country: Australia
- State: Queensland
- City: Gladstone
- LGA: Gladstone Region
- Location: 6.7 km (4.2 mi) SW of Gladstone Central; 111 km (69 mi) SE of Rockhampton; 521 km (324 mi) NNW of Brisbane

Government
  - State electorate: Gladstone
  - Federal division: Flynn

Area
  - Total: 6.2 km^{2} (2.4 sq mi)
- Elevation: 17 m (56 ft)

Population
  - Total: 6,170 (2021 census)
  - Density: 995/km^{2} (2,577/sq mi)
- Time zone: UTC+10:00 (AEST)
- Postcode: 4680
- Mean max temp: 27.5 °C (81.5 °F)
- Mean min temp: 18.2 °C (64.8 °F)
- Annual rainfall: 850.4 mm (33.48 in)
Localities around Clinton
Callemondah	Callemondah	West Gladstone
Byellee	Clinton	Kin Kora
Byellee	Kirkwood	New Auckland

Clinton is a town and suburb of Gladstone in the Gladstone Region, Queensland, Australia. In the 2021 census, the suburb of Clinton had a population of 6,170 people.

== History ==
The town was named on 5 January 1970. On 10 December 1988 the suburb of Clinton was created from the merger of the former suburbs Clinton North and Clinton South. The name Clinton is derived from the County of Clinton (the cadastral administrative division containing Gladstone).

Clinton State School opened on 29 January 1974.

On 1 April 2010, a Priority Development Area was declared in Clinton with the aim of reducing housing pressure created with the growing mining industry in the Gladstone area. 26 hectares (64 acres) of government land bounded by the Dawson Highway, Harvey Road and Keppel Avenue were released for residential land development.

== Geography ==
=== Climate ===
Clinton has a very warm humid subtropical climate bordering on a tropical savanna climate (Köppen: Cfa/Aw) with hot, wet summers and very mild, relatively dry winters. The wettest recorded day was 25 January 2013 with 271.8 mm (10.70 in) of rainfall. Extreme temperatures ranged from 41.0 °C (105.8 °F) on 12 March 2007 to 3.5 °C (38.3 °F) on 1 August 2003.

All climate data was extracted from the airport, in the north of the suburb.

Climate data for Gladstone Airport (23.87°S 151.22°E) (17 m (56 ft) AMSL) (1993-2025)
Month	Jan	Feb	Mar	Apr	May	Jun	Jul	Aug	Sep	Oct	Nov	Dec	Year
Record high °C (°F)	39.1 (102.4)	38.7 (101.7)	41.0 (105.8)	35.0 (95.0)	33.4 (92.1)	30.3 (86.5)	29.6 (85.3)	31.9 (89.4)	33.6 (92.5)	35.9 (96.6)	38.6 (101.5)	39.3 (102.7)	41.0 (105.8)
Mean daily maximum °C (°F)	30.9 (87.6)	30.8 (87.4)	30.1 (86.2)	28.2 (82.8)	25.8 (78.4)	23.6 (74.5)	23.2 (73.8)	24.2 (75.6)	26.2 (79.2)	27.8 (82.0)	29.1 (84.4)	30.3 (86.5)	27.5 (81.5)
Mean daily minimum °C (°F)	23.1 (73.6)	23.0 (73.4)	22.0 (71.6)	19.2 (66.6)	15.8 (60.4)	13.3 (55.9)	12.1 (53.8)	12.8 (55.0)	15.7 (60.3)	18.6 (65.5)	20.7 (69.3)	22.3 (72.1)	18.2 (64.8)
Record low °C (°F)	18.0 (64.4)	17.0 (62.6)	15.0 (59.0)	8.7 (47.7)	4.9 (40.8)	5.2 (41.4)	4.5 (40.1)	3.5 (38.3)	7.2 (45.0)	11.0 (51.8)	11.0 (51.8)	16.5 (61.7)	3.5 (38.3)
Average precipitation mm (inches)	135.8 (5.35)	156.9 (6.18)	117.5 (4.63)	50.2 (1.98)	36.8 (1.45)	37.1 (1.46)	31.9 (1.26)	33.3 (1.31)	26.1 (1.03)	60.8 (2.39)	64.2 (2.53)	103.2 (4.06)	850.4 (33.48)
Average precipitation days (≥ 0.2 mm)	12.0	12.0	10.1	6.4	6.1	6.1	5.4	4.7	4.1	7.4	8.3	9.9	92.5
Average afternoon relative humidity (%)	60	62	57	55	51	50	46	47	52	56	57	59	54
Average dew point °C (°F)	20.4 (68.7)	20.7 (69.3)	18.7 (65.7)	16.3 (61.3)	12.7 (54.9)	10.6 (51.1)	8.7 (47.7)	9.6 (49.3)	13.0 (55.4)	15.9 (60.6)	17.4 (63.3)	19.2 (66.6)	15.3 (59.5)
Source: Bureau of Meteorology (1993-2025)

== Demographics ==
In the 2011 census, the suburb of Clinton had a population of 5,917 people.

In the 2016 census, the suburb of Clinton had a population of 5,921 people.

In the 2021 census, the suburb of Clinton had a population of 6,170 people.

== Education ==
Clinton State School is a government primary (Early Childhood-6) school for boys and girls at Harvey Road (23.8800°S 151.2228°E). In 2015, the school had 820 students with 51 teachers (44 equivalent full-time). In 2018, the school had an enrolment of 950 students with 70 teachers (63 full-time equivalent) and 54 non-teaching staff (31 full-time equivalent). It includes a special education program.

There are no government secondary schools in Clinton. The nearest government secondary school is Gladstone State High School in neighbouring West Gladstone to the north-east.

== Facilities ==
Gladstone Airport is on Aerodrome Road (23.8691°S 151.2243°E).

The Port Curtis Lawn Cemetery is on Aerodrome Road (23.8675°S 151.2136°E). It provides lawn graves for burials and a columbarium wall and memorial garden for the interment of cremains.
