= Port Curtis (bay) =

Location in Queensland, Australia

Coordinates: 23°54′57″S 151°25′05″E

Port Curtis is a both a port and a pastoral district in Queensland, Australia. It is located off the coast of the present-day city of Gladstone and was the original name of the township. The Port Curtis pastoral district in and around Gladstone was gazetted on 23 March 1868.

== History ==
Port Curtis (the bay) was named by Matthew Flinders on 1 August 1802 after Vice Admiral Sir Roger Curtis of the Royal Navy. Curtis had assisted Flinders with repairs to HMS Investigator in Cape Town in October 1801.

Port Curtis was the capital of North Australia, a short-lived British colony established in 1846 and extinguished the following year. North Australia consisted of modern-day Northern Territory and Queensland north of 26th parallel.

== See also ==
- Electoral district of Port Curtis
