= Gladstone Region =

- Local government area
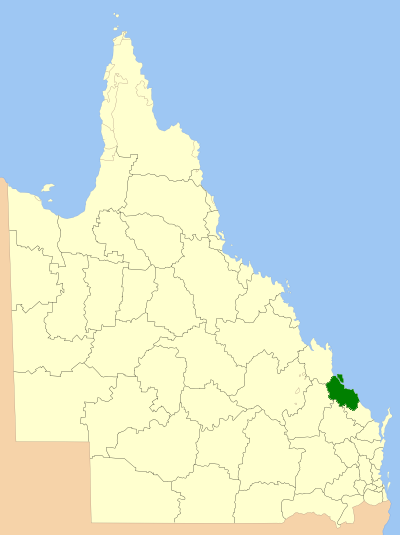
- Location within Queensland
- Interactive map of Gladstone Region
- Coordinates: 23°51′00″S 151°15′00″E
- Country: Australia
- State: Queensland
- Region: Central Queensland
- Established: 2008
- Council seat: Gladstone

Government
  - Mayor: Matt Burnett
  - State electorate: Gladstone, Burnett
  - Federal division: Flynn

Area
  - Total: 10,484 km^{2} (4,048 sq mi)

Population
  - Total: 63,515 (2021 census)
  - Density: 6.0583/km^{2} (15.6909/sq mi)
- Website: Gladstone Region
LGAs around Gladstone Region
Rockhampton	Rockhampton	Coral Sea
Banana	Gladstone Region	Coral Sea
North Burnett	Bundaberg	Bundaberg

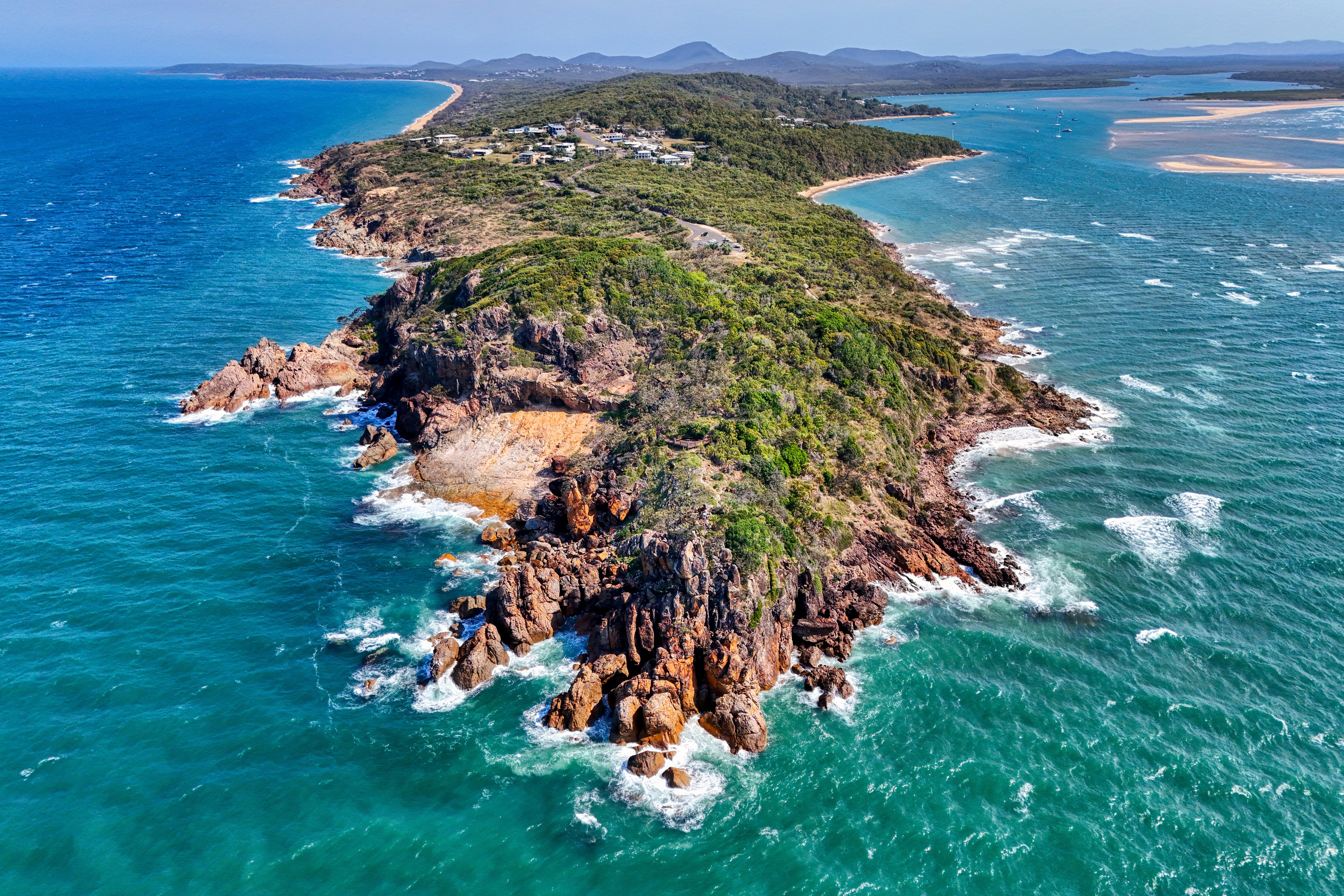
Seventeen Seventy, Queensland

Gladstone Region is a local government area in Queensland, Australia. The council covers an area of 10,484 square kilometres (4,048 sq mi), and has an estimated operating budget of A$84 million.

In the 2021 census, the Gladstone Region had a population of 63,515 people.

== History ==
Gladstone Region came into being on 15 March 2008 as a result of the report of the Local Government Reform Commission released in July 2007. The legal standing of the council is sourced from the Local Government Reform Act 2007 (Qld). The Gladstone Region was named after William Ewart Gladstone, British Chancellor of the Exchequer and he later became prime minister.

The new Council, located in Central Queensland, contains the entire area of three former local government areas:

- the City of Gladstone;
- the Shire of Calliope;
- and the Shire of Miriam Vale.

The report recommended that the new local government area should not be divided into wards and elect eight councillors and a mayor.

== Demographics ==
In the 2016 census, the Gladstone Region had a population of 61,640 people.

In the 2021 census, the Gladstone Region had a population of 63,515 people.

== Mayors ==
The first mayor of the Gladstone Regional Council was George Creed, who had been the mayor of the Calliope Shire Council. Creed retired due to ill-health in September 2010, and died November 2010. He was succeeded by Gail Sellers. The Mayor since March 2016 is Matthew James (Matt) Burnett.

== Towns and localities ==
The Gladstone Region includes the following settlements:

Gladstone area:

- Gladstone Central
- Barney Point
- Beecher
- Byellee
- Callemondah
- Clinton
- Glen Eden
- Kin Kora
- Kirkwood
- New Auckland
- O'Connell
- South Gladstone
- South Trees
- Sun Valley
- Telina
- Toolooa
- West Gladstone

Calliope area:

- Ambrose (township)
- Benaraby (town)
- Boyne Island (town)
- Bracewell
- Builyan (Boyne Valley town)
- Burua
- Calliope (town)
- East End
- Many Peaks (Boyne Valley town)
- Mount Larcom (township)
- Nagoorin (Boyne Valley town)
- Raglan (township)
- Tannum Sands (town)
- Ubobo (Boyne Valley town)
- West Stowe
- Wooderson
- Wurdong Heights (locality)
- Yarwun (township)

Miriam Vale area:

- 1770 (town)
- Agnes Water (town)
- Baffle Creek
- Bororen (village)
- Captain Creek
- Colosseum
- Deepwater
- Euleilah
- Gindoran
- Lowmead (village)
- Miriam Vale (town)
- Rosedale (village)

== Facilities ==
The council controls the assets of the Gladstone Airport which was previously operated by the Gladstone Calliope Aerodrome Board. This Board was a statutory body made up of representatives of the City of Gladstone and Shire of Calliope.

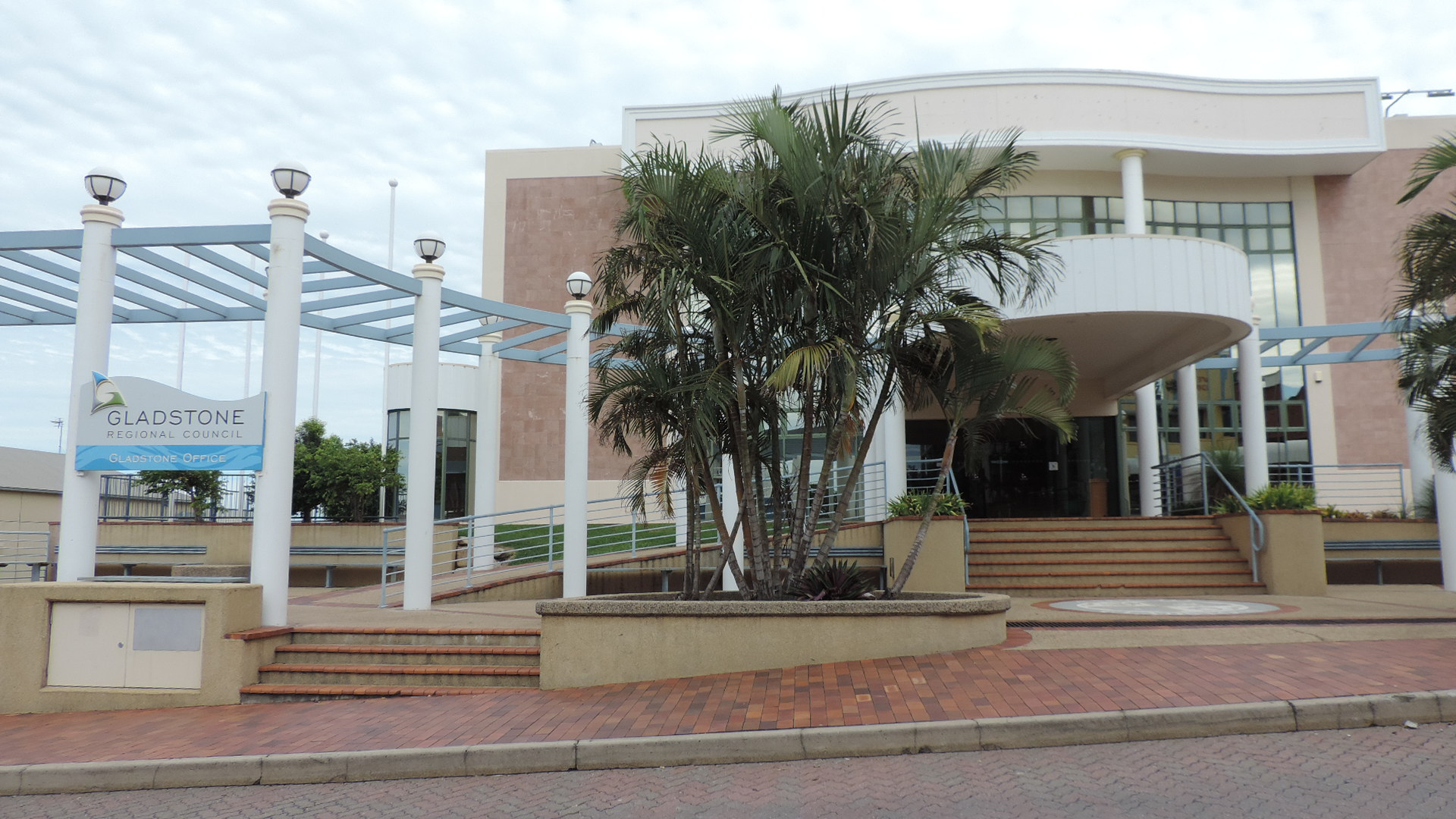
Gladstone Regional Council offices in Gladstone Central, 2014

The council has three administration centres, located at:

- 101 Goondoon Street, Gladstone Central
- 5 Don Cameron Drive, Calliope
- 36 Roe Street, Miriam Vale

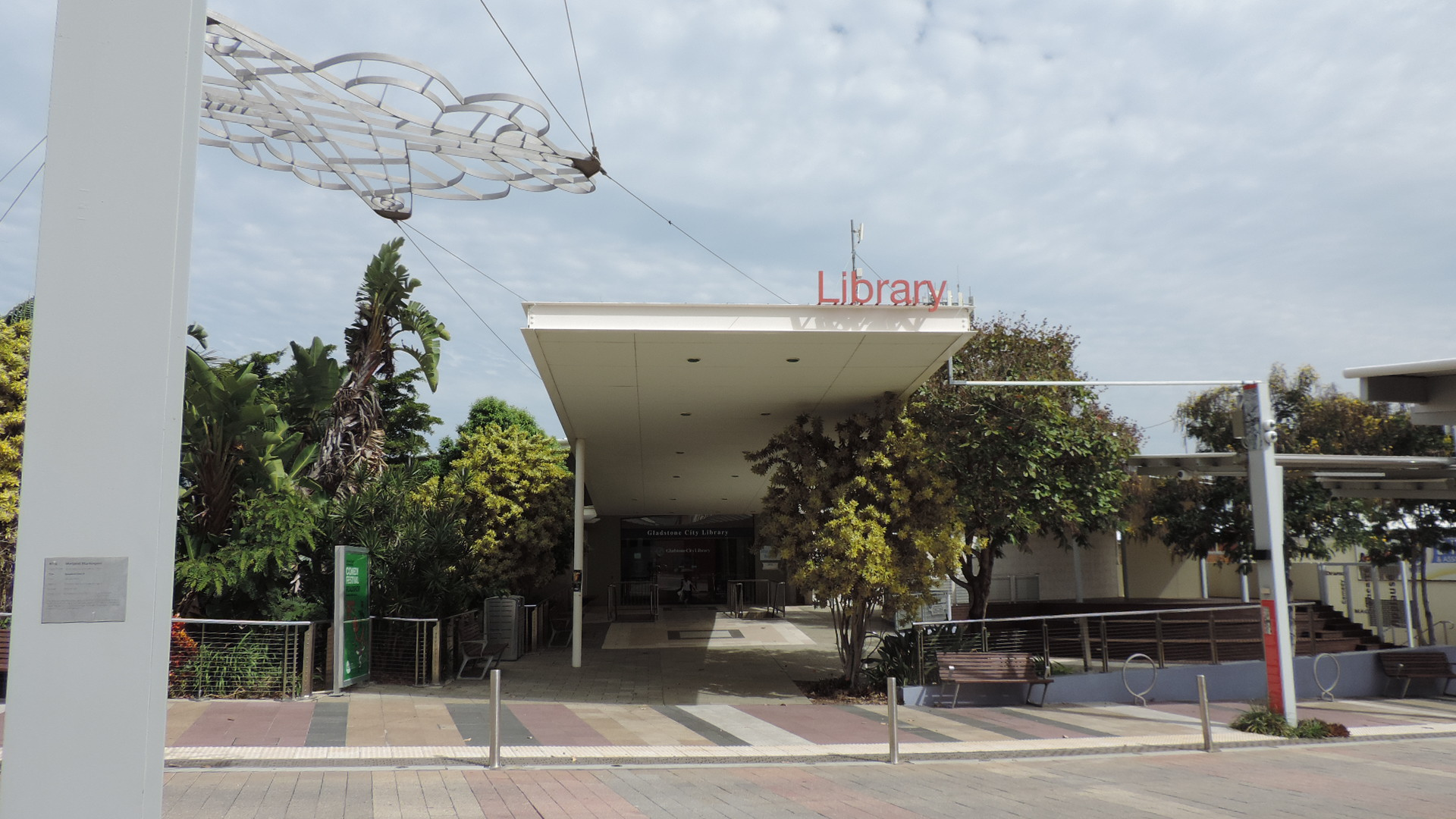
Entrance to Gladstone City Library, 2014

The council operates a network of public libraries, located at Agnes Water, Boyne Island, Calliope, Gladstone Central, Miriam Vale and Mount Larcom.

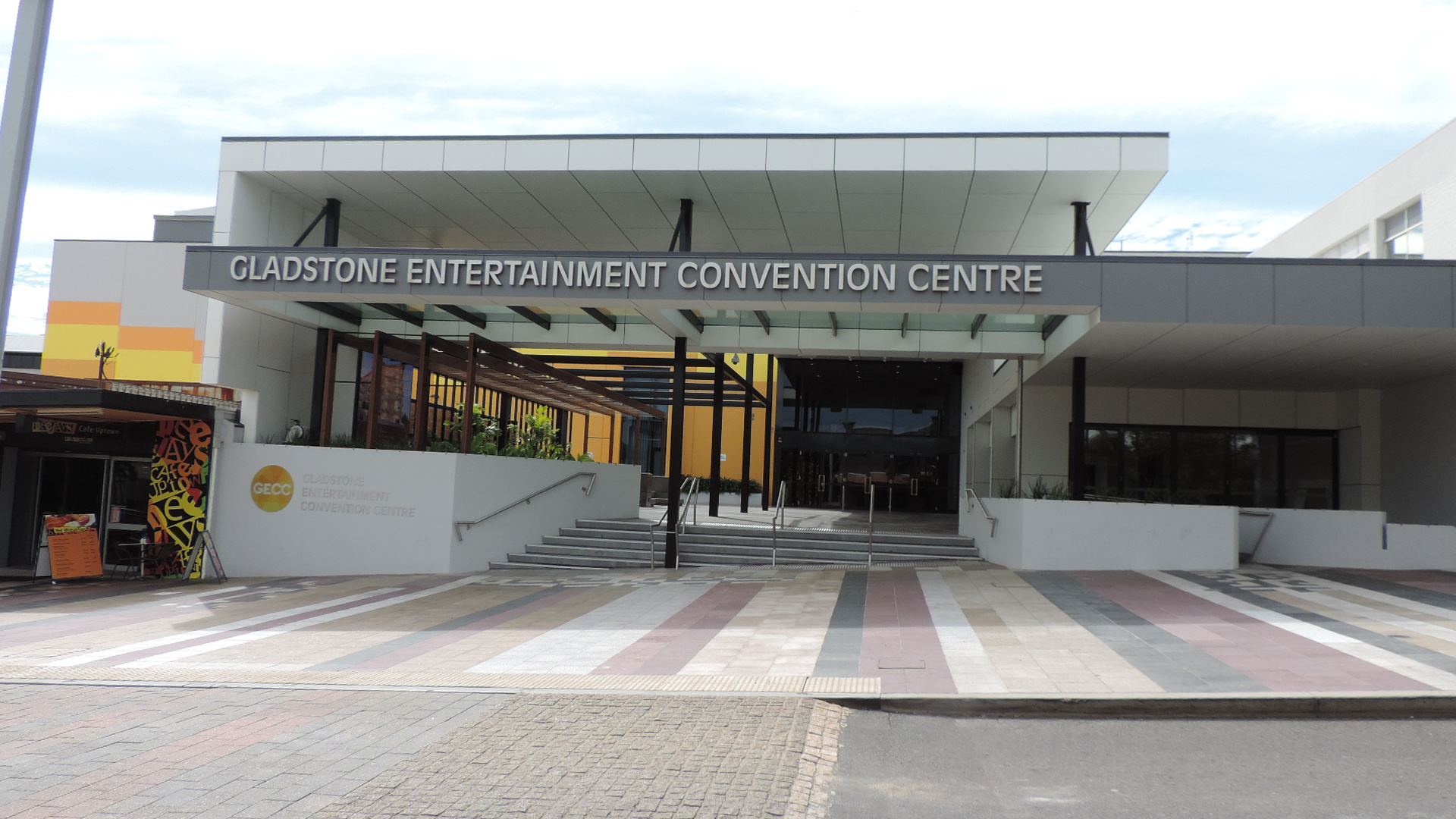
Gladstone Entertainment & Convention Centre, 2014

The council operate the Gladstone Entertainment & Convention Centre at 58 Goondoon Street, Gladstone Central. It features an auditorium seating 674 people, a flat floor space which can accommodate 1,500 people standing, an outdoor 600 square metres (6,500 sq ft) marquee on a hard stand, and a number of meeting rooms.

== Industry within the region ==
=== Gladstone Ports Corporation ===
Gladstone's port is Queensland's largest multi-commodity port, handling more than 79 Mt of cargo annually.

As a government owned corporation, Gladstone Ports Corporation (GPC) controls and manages the facility. GPC is unique among Australian port authorities because it acts as a 'landlord' as well as owning and operating cargo handling facilities. The GPC provides 35 hectares of recreational waterfront facilities at the marina and Spinnaker Park, which includes barbecues, shade shelters, 250 mooring berths, playground equipment, walking trails and a man-made beach.

=== Austick ===
Austicks Pty Ltd produces ice cream sticks from plantation-sourced timber. The factory, located at Gladstone, produces for both the domestic and export markets.

=== Boyne Smelter Limited ===
Rio Tinto Alcan (RTA) is the largest shareholder in the Boyne Smelters Limited. (BSL) joint venture and has been operating in the Gladstone region for over 40 years. As a shareholder in other local industry operations including Rio Tinto Alcan Yarwun, Queensland Alumina Limited (QAL) and the Gladstone Power Station, RTA maintains significant contributions of A$3.34 billion into the region‟s economy annually. BSL has been in operation since 1982 and over time has undergone extensive expansion. The smelter underwent a A$1 billion expansion in 1997 introducing a third reduction line which increased aluminium production from 260,000 to more than 558,000 tonnes per annum.

=== Cement Australia Limited (Queensland) ===
Cement Australia Gladstone is the largest cement Plant in Australia and uses state of the art technology. The plant is Australia's most efficient and is the leading environmental performer in the industry.

Cement Australia Gladstone has a production capacity of over 1.6 million tonnes per annum and processes limestone, clay, silica sand and copper slag to produce and supply cement and clinker throughout Australia and overseas destinations, as well as cement in bulk or in bags.

=== Rio Tinto Aluminium Yarwun (RTA) ===
RTA has been part of the Gladstone community for over 40 years. RTA maintains a significant shareholding in Queensland Alumina Ltd, the Gladstone Power Station and a shareholding and management of Boyne Smelters Limited. A 2008 Socio-economic study found that Rio Tinto Alcan contributed A$3.34 billion annually into the region‟s economy.

RTAY was constructed between 2002 and 2004 at a capital cost of A$1.4 billion. Stage One of RTAY has the capacity to provide 1.4 million tonnes of smelter grade alumina per annum and with the construction of Stage Two currently taking place the refinery will increase its production capacity to 3.4 million tonnes per annum.

=== Tourism ===
The Gladstone Region is the gateway to Great Barrier Reef islands and lagoons, including Heron, Lady Musgrave, North West and Wilson, among others.

The Brisbane to Gladstone Yacht Race, with its associated harbour celebrations, and other destination events are held in the region.

Lake Awoonga and several communities along the coast offer beach, boating and fishing facilities.

In the hinterland, the 26.28 km (16.33 mi) Dawes Range Tunnel section of the Boyne Burnett Inland Rail Trail starts at Barrimoon Siding, Kalpowar and finishes at Builyan, Boyne Valley. This section contains six tunnels between Barrimoon Siding and Golembil Siding. These tunnels have been listed on the Local Heritage Register of Gladstone Regional Council. It also passes historic townships with their Local Heritage listed attractions.

== Sister city ==
As part of Sister Cities Australia Inc. (SCA) the Gladstone Region began a Sister City relationship with Saiki City, Oita Prefecture, Japan in 1996.
