= South Gladstone, Queensland =

South Gladstone
- Suburb
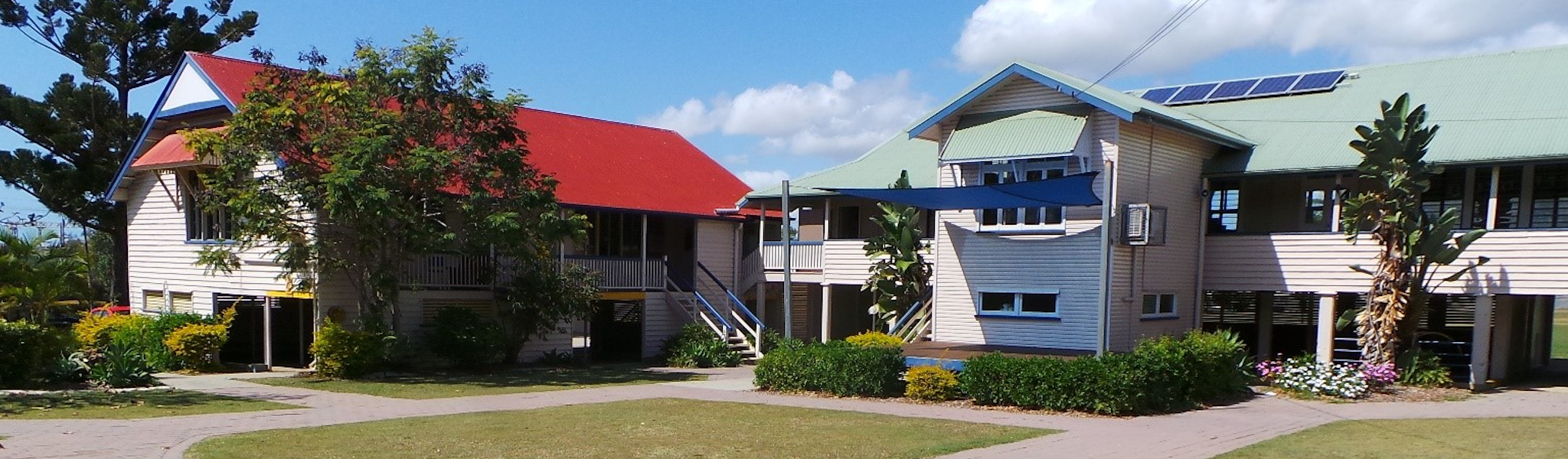
- Gladstone South State School, circa 2022

- Interactive map of South Gladstone
- Coordinates: 23.8619°S 151.2672°E
- Country: Australia
- State: Queensland
- City: Gladstone
- LGA: Gladstone Region
- Location: 3.4 km (2.1 mi) SSE of Gladstone CBD; 111 km (69 mi) SE of Rockhampton; 535 km (332 mi) NNW of Brisbane

Government
  - State electorate: Gladstone
  - Federal division: Flynn

Area
  - Total: 3.2 km^{2} (1.2 sq mi)

Population
  - Total: 3,476 (2021 census)
  - Density: 1,086/km^{2} (2,810/sq mi)
- Time zone: UTC+10:00 (AEST)
- Postcode: 4680
Suburbs around South Gladstone
Gladstone Central	Gladstone Central	Barney Point
West Gladstone	South Gladstone	South Trees
Sun Valley	Toolooa	South Trees

South Gladstone is a suburb of Gladstone in the Gladstone Region, Queensland, Australia. In the 2021 census, South Gladstone had a population of 3,476 people.

== History ==
In about 1895, a frozen meat works was established at Parson's Point with production commencing on 24 May 1896. The location was chosen for its access to Port Curtis for harbour facilities and the adjacent railway line.

Concerned citizens at Parsons Point decided a school was needed for to cater for the meatworkers’ children. A provisional school was built at Parsons Point in 1898 and Parson's Point Provisional School opened on 1 August 1898. The provisional school became Parsons Point State School on 1 February 1913. A second site was offered for a new school – an acre of land adjacent to the road leading to the meatworks, about 400 yards from the present school. The new school was opened in 1915. In October 1934, land bordered by Little, Toolooa, Derby and Ann Streets was offered as a possible site for the relocation of the school. Finally, in 1945, the school was moved to its present location in Toolooa Street and renamed South Gladstone State School. During the 1980s the name was changed from South Gladstone State School to Gladstone South State School to be consistent with the naming of other schools in Gladstone. The school swimming pool was built in the 1980s and Gladstone South is still the only primary school in the Gladstone city area that has its own swimming facilities. A school dental clinic was opened in 1981.

Gladstone Water Treatment Plant opened in 1972 with an initial capacity to produce of 14 megalitres (490×10^{3} cu ft) of drinking water each day.

Toolooa State High School opened on 27 January 1981 with 11 teachers and almost 200 Year 8 students. The name Toolooa is a reference to theTulua people, the Aboriginal people who traditionally occupied the Gladstone area.

== Demographics ==
In the 2011 census, South Gladstone had a population of 3,626 people.

In the 2016 census, South Gladstone had a population of 3,295 people.

In the 2021 census, South Gladstone had a population of 3,476 people.

== Education ==
Gladstone South State School is a government primary (Prep-6) school for boys and girls at 153 Toolooa Street (23.8617°S 151.2704°E). In 2013, the school had 251 students and 29 teachers (23 full-time equivalent). By 2017, it had become a primary (P-6) school as part of an overall change to state education, and the school had an enrolment of 330 students with 22 teachers (20 full-time equivalent) and 24 non-teaching staff (16 full-time equivalent). In 2018, the school had an enrolment of 347 students with 27 teachers (24 full-time equivalent) and 22 non-teaching staff (14 full-time equivalent). It includes a special education program.

Toolooa State High School is a government secondary (7-12) school for boys and girls at Philip Street (23.8732°S 151.2704°E). In 2013, the school had 839 students with 66 teachers (63 full-time equivalent). In 2018, the school had an enrolment of 1,042 students with 87 teachers (82 full-time equivalent) and 55 non-teaching staff (35 full-time equivalent). It includes a special education program.

Trinity College Gladstone has a campus at 25 Derby Street, focusing on Secondary Education. (23.8618°S 151.2646°E) (23.8623°S 151.2641°E).

== Facilities ==
Gladstone Water Treatment Plant is at 3 Bruce Street (23.8705°S 151.2650°E). It draws water from Lake Awoonga and, on average, it supplies 24 megalitres (850×10^{3} cu ft) drinking water each day, but can produce up to 57 megalitres (2.0×10^{6} cu ft) per day.

Gladstone SES Facility is at 7 Lamington Drive (23.8730°S 151.2620°E).

== Amenities ==
Port City Christian Church is at 10-12 McCann Street (23.8726°S 151.2641°E). It is affiliated with the Australian Christian Churches.
