= West Gladstone, Queensland =

West Gladstone
- Suburb
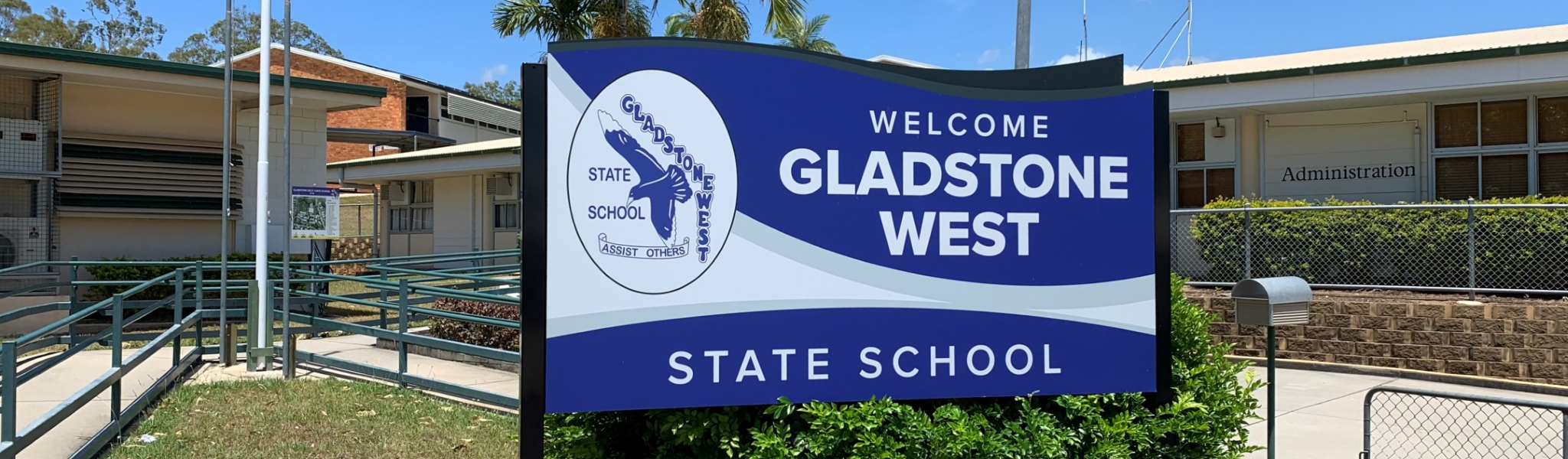
- Gladstone West State School, circa 2022

- Interactive map of West Gladstone
- Coordinates: 23.8583°S 151.2461°E
- Country: Australia
- State: Queensland
- City: Gladstone
- LGA: Gladstone Region
- Location: 2.3 km (1.4 mi) S of Gladstone CBD; 108 km (67 mi) SE of Rockhampton; 513 km (319 mi) NNW of Brisbane

Government
  - State electorate: Gladstone
  - Federal division: Flynn

Area
  - Total: 7.1 km^{2} (2.7 sq mi)
- Elevation: 0–135 m (0–443 ft)

Population
  - Total: 4,844 (2021 census)
  - Density: 682/km^{2} (1,767/sq mi)
- Time zone: UTC+10:00 (AEST)
- Postcode: 4680
Suburbs around West Gladstone
Callemondah	Gladstone Central	Gladstone Central
Callemondah	West Gladstone	South Gladstone
Clinton; New Auckland	Kin Kora	Sun Valley

West Gladstone is a suburb of Gladstone in the Gladstone Region, Queensland, Australia. In the 2021 census, West Gladstone had a population of 4,844 people.

== Geography ==
The suburb is bounded to the west and north-west in part by the Auckland Inlet, to the north in part by Murray Street and Side Street, to the east in part by Glenlyon Street, and to the south in part by Philip Street.

The suburb is at sea level in the west by the Auckland Inlet and rises towards the east of the suburb. Round Hill in the south-east of the suburb (23.8685°S 151.2553°E) is the highest point, rising to 135 metres (443 ft).

Dawson Road enters the suburb from the north-east (Gladstone Central/CBD) and exits to the south-west (Clinton, New Auckland, Kin Kora) as the Dawson Highway.

The North Coast railway line enters the suburb from the west (Callemondah) and exits to the north-east (Gladstone Central/CBD); there are no railway stations within West Gladstone.

== History ==
Gladstone State High School opened on 2 February 1953.

Gladstone West State School opened on 24 January 1966.

A Catholic secondary school opened in 1966 with 23 boys and girls in Year 8 in temporary premises at the Star of the Sea Church and School in Gladstone CBD. In 1967, the school relocated to its present site in West Gladstone, where the Sisters of Mercy established Stella Maris College for the girls. In 1968, the Marist Brothers established Chanel College as the school for the boys. Later, the two schools amalgamated as Gladstone Catholic High School. In 1985, the school adopted the name Chanel College for the co-educational school.

Rosella Park School opened on 17 May 1971.

The Mater Hospital Gladstone was opened on 14 April 1999 by the Mater Group, a Catholic healthcare organisation founded by the Sisters of Mercy. In April 2020, the Mater Group sold the Mater Hospital Gladstone to Queensland Health to become the West Wing of Gladstone Hospital. The Mater Group closed the hospital due to declining numbers of private patients making it financially unviable. The hospital had ceased maternity services in October 2018 and by January 2020 was only offering day surgery. It was a Catholic private hospital at 50 Rossella Street (23.8504°S 151.2475°E).

== Demographics ==
In the 2011 census, West Gladstone had a population of 5,201 people.

In the 2016 census, West Gladstone had a population of 4,728 people.

In the 2021 census, West Gladstone had a population of 4,844 people.

== Education ==
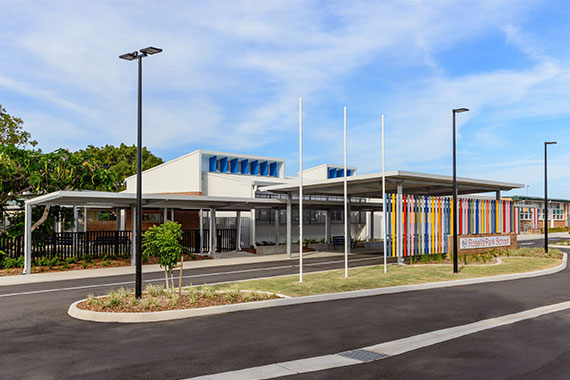
Rosella Park School, circa 2022

Gladstone West State School is a government primary (Prep-6) school for boys and girls at Boles Street (23.8597°S 151.2525°E). In 2018, the school had an enrolment of 641 students with 45 teachers (43 full-time equivalent) and 35 non-teaching staff (23 full-time equivalent). It includes a special education program.

Rosella Park School is a special primary and secondary (Prep-12) school for boys and girls at 20 Park Street (23.8521°S 151.2475°E). In 2018, the school had an enrolment of 78 students with 22 teachers (20 full-time equivalent) and 32 non-teaching staff (20 full-time equivalent).

Gladstone State High School is a government secondary (7–12) school for boys and girls at 30 Dawson Road (23.8516°S 151.2508°E). In 2018, the school had an enrolment of 1,512 students with 120 teachers (112 full-time equivalent) and 68 non-teaching staff (48 full-time equivalent). It includes a special education program. It includes the EQIP Technical College, a secondary (11–12) technical education unit on Boles Street (23.8516°S 151.2533°E).

Chanel College is a Catholic secondary (7–12) school for boys and girls at 11 Paterson Street (23.8672°S 151.2425°E). In 2018, the school had an enrolment of 481 students with 45 teachers (43 full-time equivalent) and 29 non-teaching staff (26 full-time equivalent).

== Attractions ==
Round Hill Lookout is on Round Hill at the end of Boles Street. It offers 360-degree views across Gladstone.

== Amenities ==
Stockland Gladstone is a shopping centre at 75 Dawson Highway and across the road at 195 Philip Street (23.8695°S 151.2408°E).

=== Parks ===
There are a number of parks in the area:

- Ailsa Street (23.8449°S 151.2464°E)
- Auckland Creek Park (23.8504°S 151.2377°E)
- Boles Street Park (23.8690°S 151.2549°E)
- Carramar Park (23.8530°S 151.2441°E)
- Coase Park (23.8546°S 151.2480°E)
- Derribong Park (23.8636°S 151.2447°E)
- Glen Creek Park (23.8574°S 151.2463°E)
- Illoura Park (23.8639°S 151.2499°E)
- Kooyong Park (23.8575°S 151.2489°E)
- Lions Park (23.8713°S 151.2388°E)
- Matson Crescent Park (23.8655°S 151.2520°E)
- Palm Drive Junior Sporting Complex (23.8581°S 151.2445°E)
- Potters Park (23.8518°S 151.2499°E)
- Reg Tanna Park (23.8533°S 151.2584°E)
- Webb Park (23.8513°S 151.2421°E)

== Facilities ==
Gladstone Fire & Rescue Station is at 3 Charles Street (23.8583°S 151.2494°E).

Gladstone Hospital is a public hospital at 10 Park Street (23.8501°S 151.2490°E).

Gladstone Cemetery is on the south-west corner of the Dawson Highway and Cemetery Road (23.8677°S 151.2396°E).
