= Gladstone Central =

- Suburb
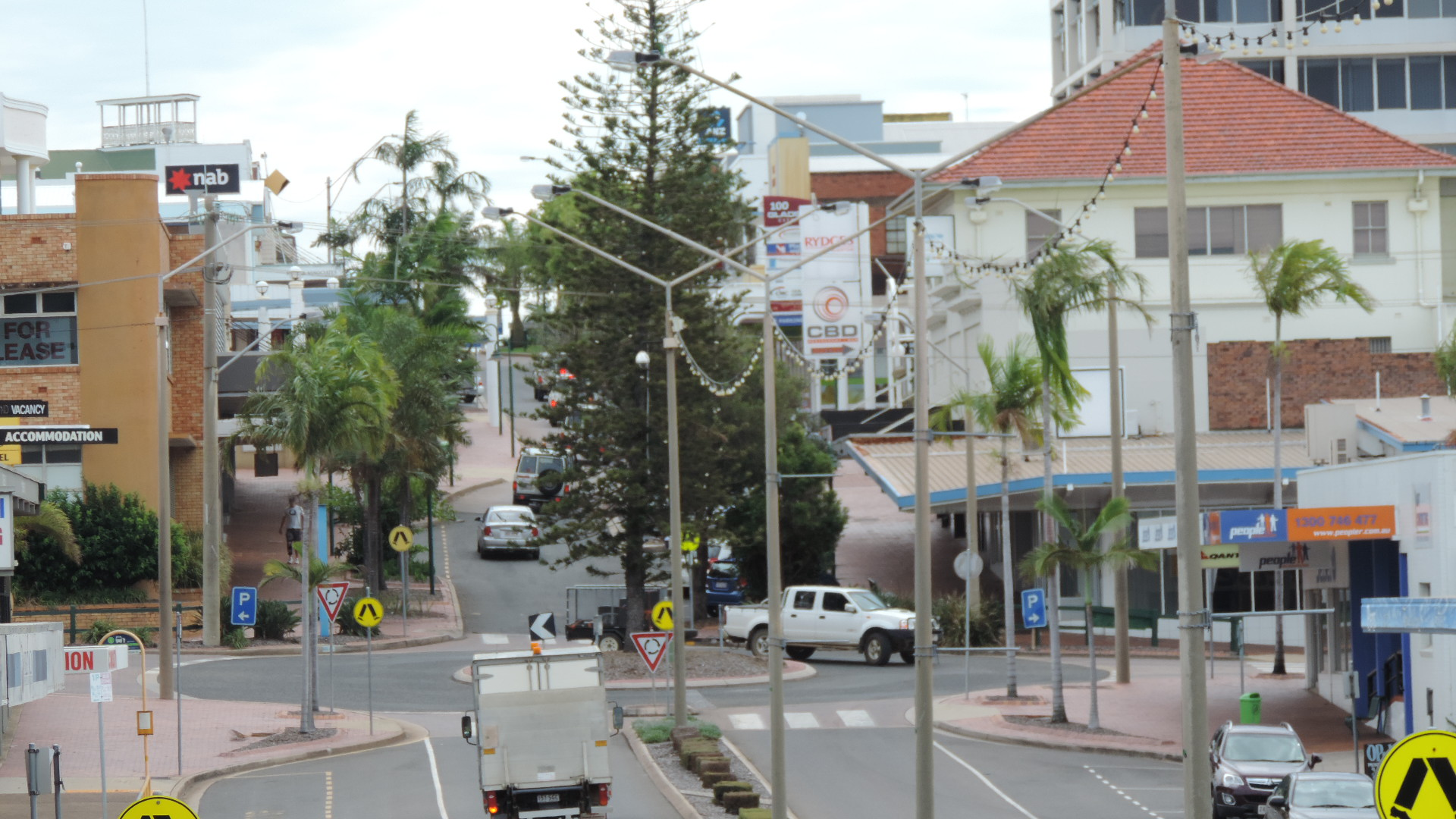
- Looking up Goondoon Street, 2014

- Interactive map of Gladstone Central
- Coordinates: 23°50′30″S 151°14′58″E
- Country: Australia
- State: Queensland
- City: Gladstone
- LGA: Gladstone Region
- Location: 108 km (67 mi) SE of Rockhampton; 513 km (319 mi) NNE of Brisbane

Government
  - State electorate: Gladstone
  - Federal division: Flynn

Area
  - Total: 3.1 km^{2} (1.2 sq mi)

Population
  - Total: 1,550 (2021 census)
  - Density: 500/km^{2} (1,295/sq mi)
- Time zone: UTC+10:00 (AEST)
- Postcode: 4680
Suburbs around Gladstone Central
Callemondah	Callemondah	Gladstone Harbour
Callemondah	Gladstone Central	Barney Point
Callemondah	West Gladstone	South Gladstone

Gladstone Central is a coastal suburb of Gladstone in the Gladstone Region, Queensland, Australia. It is the historic centre and central business district of the city of Gladstone and the seat of the Gladstone Regional Council. In the 2021 census, Gladstone Central had a population of 1,550 people.

== Geography ==
Gladstone Central is bounded by Auckland Inlet on the north, Auckland Creek and Side Street on the west, the railway line on the east and a combination of Scenery Street and Tank Street on the south.

Auckland Point is the northernmost part of the suburb (23.8333°S 151.25°E).

The main business and shopping street is Goondoon Street which runs over a hill, its apex being at the intersection with Roseberry Street.

== History ==
The Gladstone Post Office opened on 1 July 1854.

Gladstone State School opened on 1 April 1861 and is one of the oldest state primary schools in Queensland. On 14 November 1968, its name was changed to Gladstone Central State School.

Star of the Sea Catholic Primary School opened on 19 January 1902.

Gladstone City Library opened in 2003.

== Demographics ==
In the 2011 census, Gladstone Central had a population of 1,529 people.

In the 2016 census, Gladstone Central had a population of 1,547 people.

In the 2021 census, Gladstone Central had a population of 1,550 people.

== Amenities ==
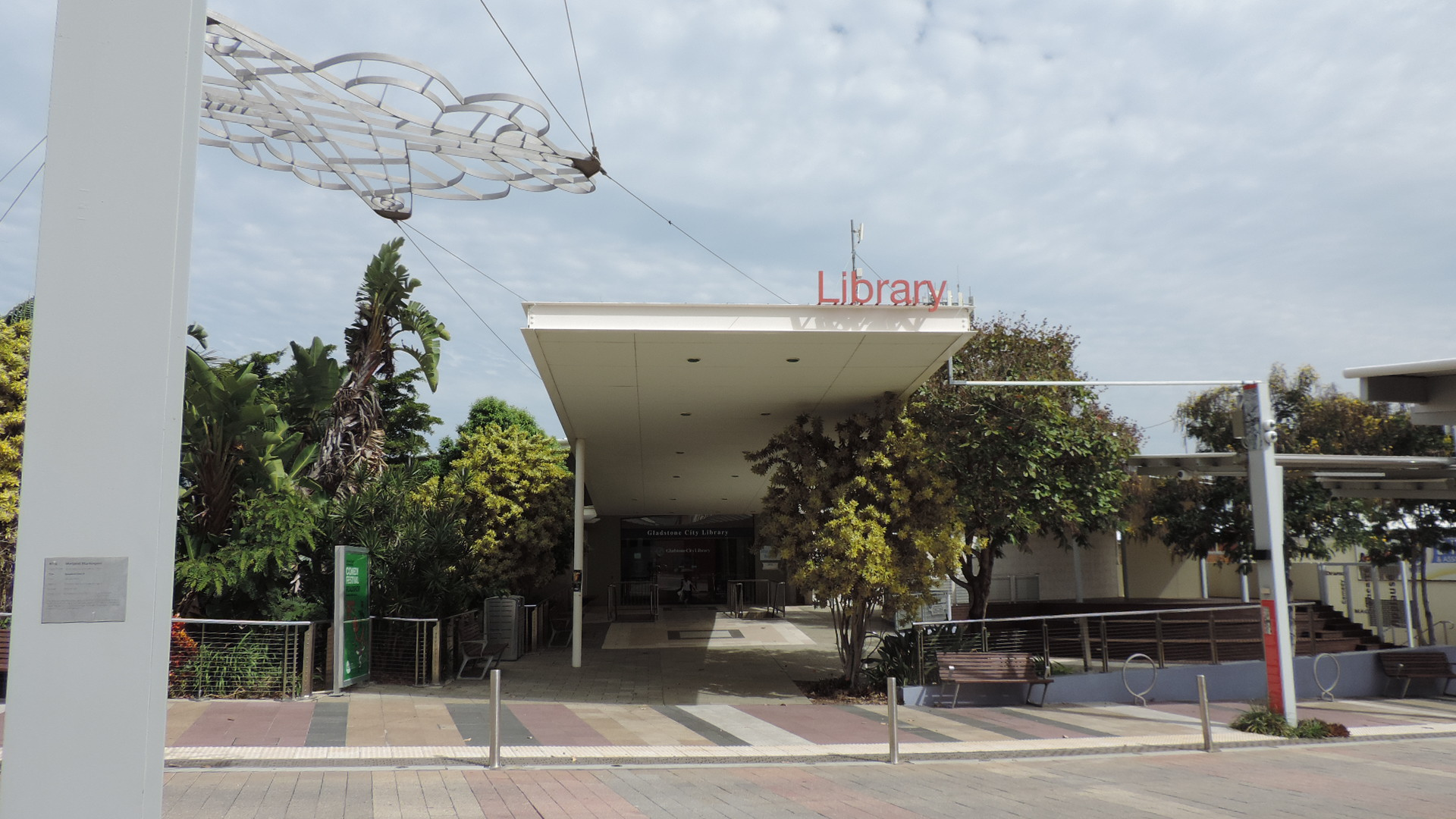
Entrance to Gladstone City Library, 2014

The Gladstone City Library is at 39 Goondoon Street; it is operated by the Gladstone Regional Council.

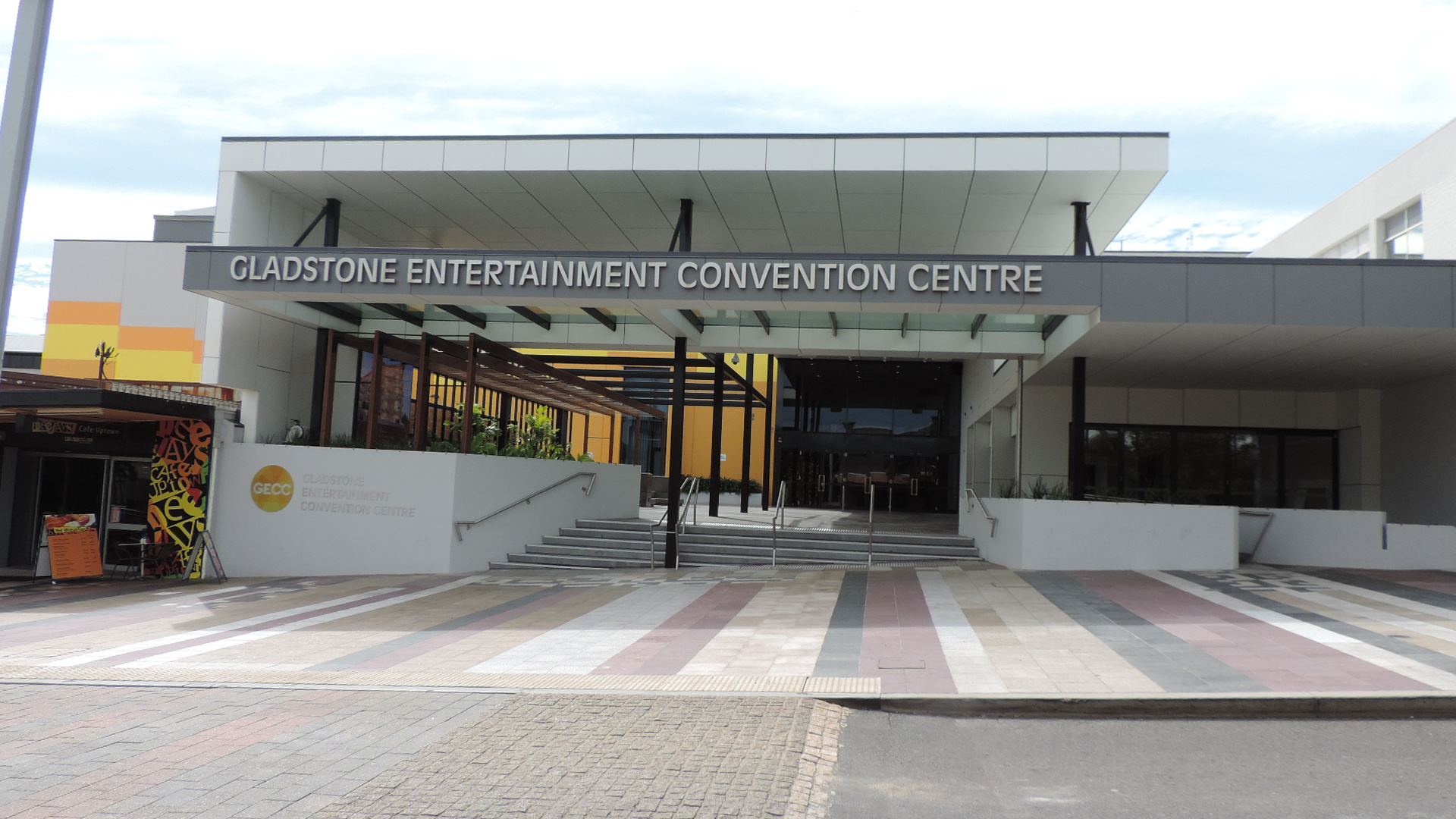
Gladstone Entertainment & Convention Centre, 2014

The Gladstone Entertainment Convention Centre is at 58 Goondoon Street; it is operated by the Gladstone Regional Council. It features an auditorium seating 674 people, a flat floor space which can accommodate 1,500 people standing, an outdoor 600 square metres (6,500 sq ft) marquee on a hard stand, and a number of meeting rooms.

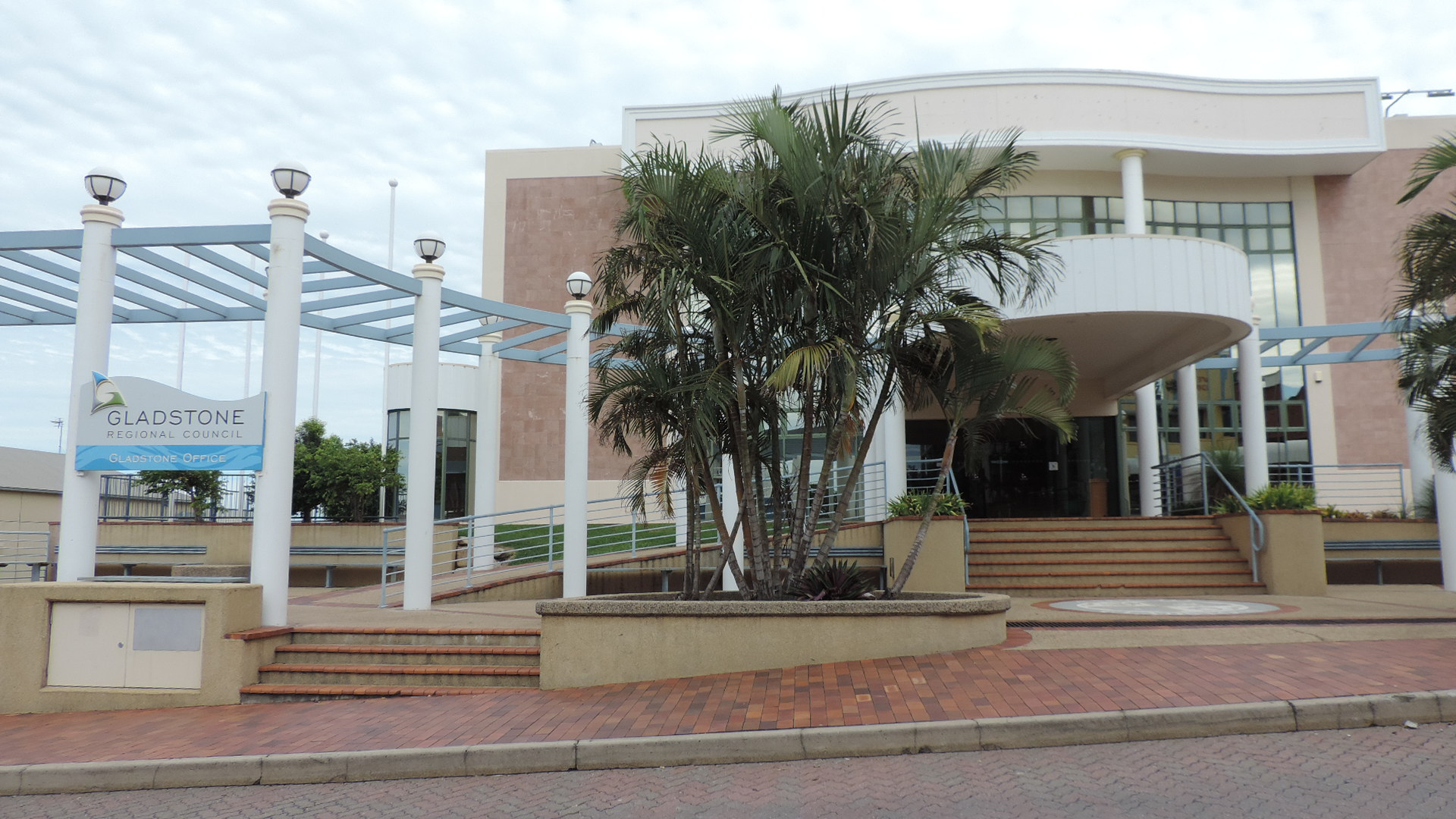
Gladstone Regional Council offices, 2014

There is a Gladstone Regional Council administration centre at 101 Goondoon Street.

The Gladstone branch of the Queensland Country Women's Association meets at the QCWA Hall at 88 Oaka Lane.

== Churches ==
=== St Andrew's Presbyterian Church ===
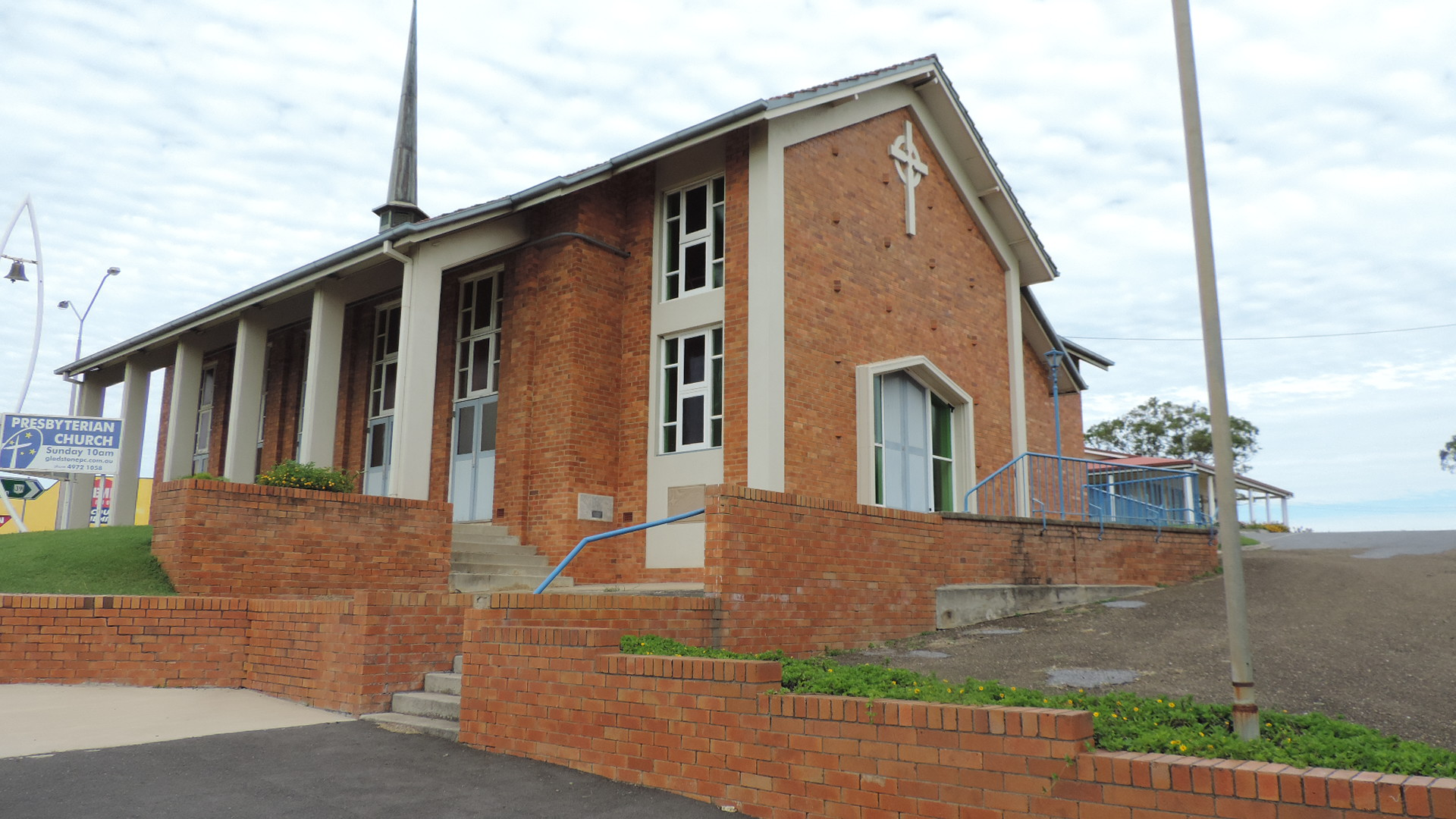
St Andrew's Presbyterian Church, 149 Goondoon Street, Gladstone Central, 2014

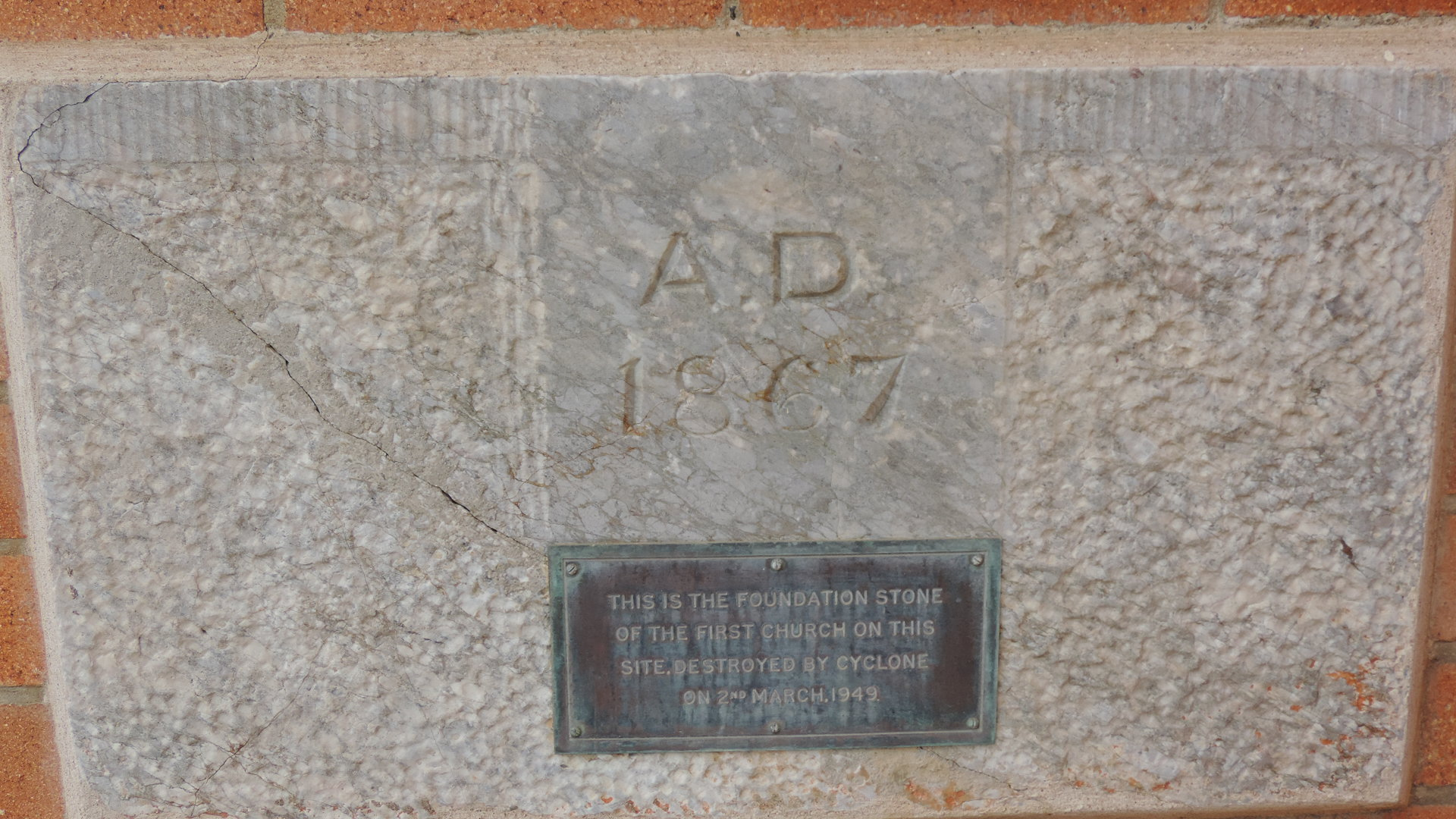
Foundation stone of original St Andrew's Presbyterian Church was laid in 1867

St Andrew's Presbyterian Church is located at 149 Goondoon Street on the corner of Bramston Street. This is the second church built on this site.

A Presbyterian minister, Alexander Proudfoot, arrived in Gladstone in September 1865; he was the first religious leader in Gladstone. However, for two years, there were not sufficient funds to build a church until a generous donation of £200 was received from a local settler. The church was designed by Mr Ramsay, the town surveyor in Maryborough. The foundation stone of the first church was laid on 30 October 1867 by Mrs Proudfoot, wife of Rev. Proudfoot. The brick Gothic church to accommodate 250 worshippers were built by local contractors, Smith, Hay and Day, at a cost of £457; it could accommodate 250 worshippers. In April 1870, W. S. Robertson donated a marble font which he designed and executed using marble from his own quarry on the Calliope River. This was the first church to be built in Gladstone.

Still the only religious leader in Gladstone, Alexander Proudfoot died on 11 April 1873 aged 42 years in Rockhampton (where he had been taken for medical treatment as Gladstone had no doctor). His widow established a ladies' school in Rockhampton 4 months later. The Rev. A. A. Laing took charge of the parish from 8 February 1874. Rev. Laing was replaced by Rev. J. Blaine in June 1875.

The church was destroyed by a cyclone on 2 March 1949. On 11 September 1955, the Governor of Queensland, Sir John Lavarack laid the foundation stone for the new St Andrew's church. The original foundation stone, font and pulpit were recovered from the demolished church and were incorporated into the new church.

=== Our Lady Star of the Sea Catholic Church ===
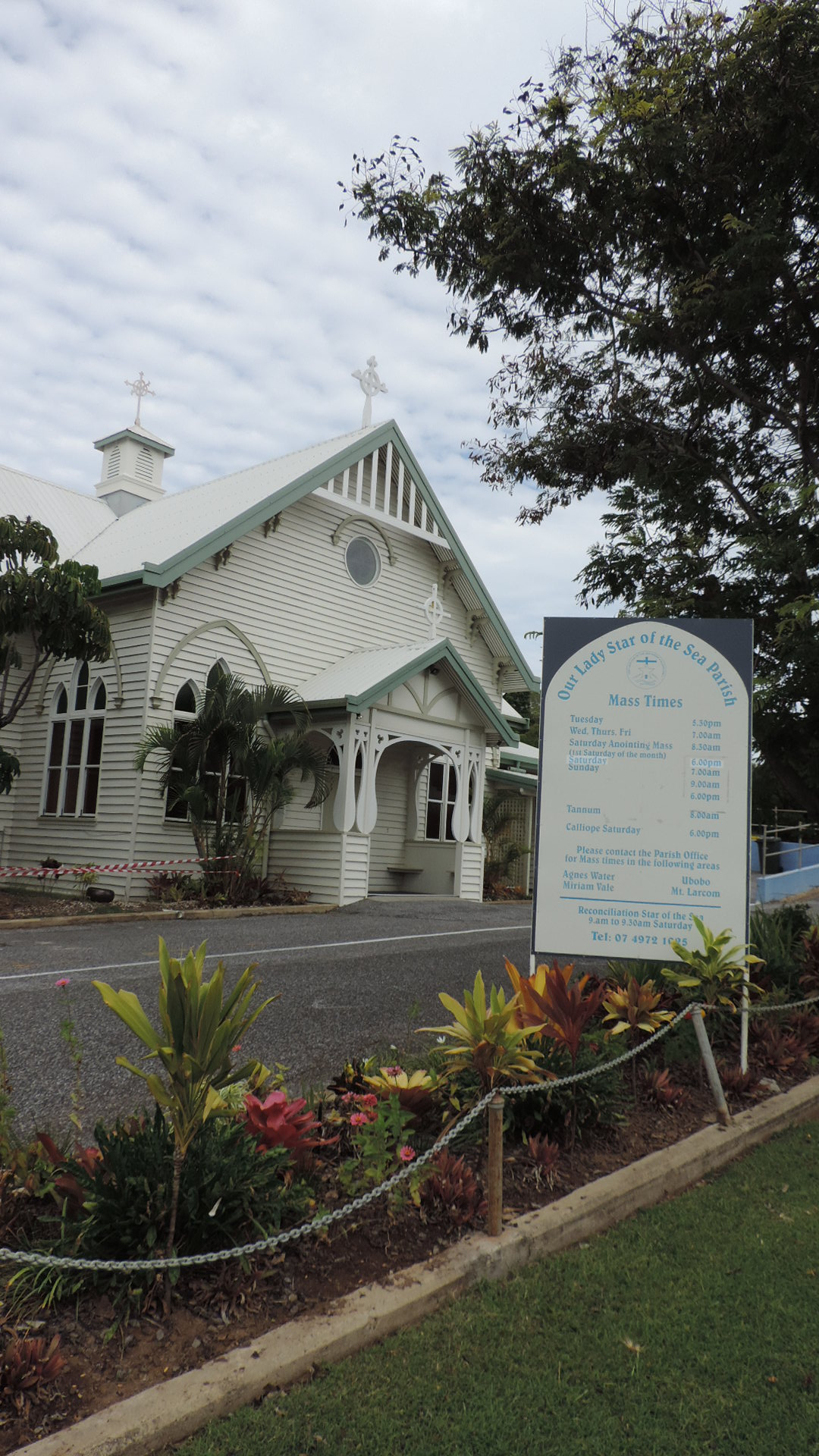
Our Lady Star of the Sea Catholic Church, 2014

Our Lady Star of the Sea Catholic church is located at 181-185 Goondoon street (south-west corner with Herbert Street). It has an adjoining school. It is the third Catholic church to be built in Gladstone.

The first Catholic church in Gladstone was St Mary's Church in Auckland Street. It was opened on 1 March 1874 by the Rev. Dean Murlay, but did not have a resident priest until 1885. However, in 1902, the land was resumed to build a new railway line between Gladstone and Rockhampton.

A site of 2 acres (0.81 ha) bounded by Goondoon Street, Herbert Street and Glenlyon Road was purchased with a plan to build a precinct to eventually comprise a church, a school, a convent and a monastery. The monastery would serve as both a presbytery and a sanitorium for missionaries working in the Pacific islands. The architects for the new church and school were Eaton and Bates; the builders were Robinson & Freeman. The new church was opened on 19 January 1902 by the Bishop of Rockhampton, Joseph Higgins.

A larger church was required to meet the growing parish, leaving to the current church being built in 1924 at a cost of £2700. The foundation stone was laid on 13 April 1924 by the Bishop of Rockhampton, Rev. Joseph Sheil. It was officially opened on 16 November 1924. The second church continued to be used as part of the school.

In the cyclone of 2 March 1949, the convent and school were destroyed but the church survived.

== Education ==
Gladstone Central State School is a government primary (Prep-6) school for boys and girls at 74 Auckland Street (23.8418°S 151.2576°E). In 2017, the school had an enrolment of 342 students with 24 teachers (22 full-time equivalent) and 16 non-teaching staff (12 full-time equivalent). In 2018, the school had an enrolment of 356 students with 25 teachers (23 full-time equivalent) and 16 non-teaching staff (11 full-time equivalent). It includes a special education program.

Star of the Sea Catholic Primary School is a Catholic primary (Prep-6) school for boys and girls at 181 Goondoon Street (23.8474°S 151.2579°E). In 2018, the school had an enrolment of 261 students with 24 teachers (17 full-time equivalent) and 17 non-teaching staff (9 full-time equivalent).

There are no secondary schools in Gladstone Central. The nearest government secondary school is Gladstone State High School in West Gladstone to the south.
