= Gladstone State High School =

Location
- 30 Dawson Road; West Gladstone, Queensland; Australia; 23.853°S 151.251°E

Information
- Type: Public, secondary
- Motto: Sic Itur Ad Astra (Reach for the Stars)
- Established: 1953
- Principal: Garry Goltz
- Grades: 7–12
- Enrolment: 1552 (2020)
- Colours: Blue and yellow

Gladstone State High School is a coeducational public secondary school based in West Gladstone, a suburb of Gladstone in the Gladstone Region in Queensland, Australia. The school has a total enrolment of more than 1500 students per year, with an official count of 1552 students in August 2020.

As at 2019, Gladstone State High School consists of over 125 staff members, including the school principal, Garry Goltz, as well as five deputy principals, two heads of school, thirteen heads of department, six year-level coordinators and three guidance officers.

== Sporting houses ==
Gladstone State High School includes the following four sporting houses with their respective colours:

House name	Colour
Damala	Yellow
Kougari	Red
Parnka	Green
Tyalan	Blue

== Vocational Education & Training (VET) ==
- Certificate III in Fitness

== Other activities ==
- Weekend Visual Art workshops
- SEP Camp; A social and life-skilling camp for students in the Special Education Program.
- Tournament of Minds
- Dance Group
- Weekend Drama Performance Workshops

=== Music ===
- Tutoring at Primary Instrumental Music Workshops

=== Sports ===
Inter-house competitions:

- Cross Country
- House presentations
- Swimming and Athletics Carnivals
- Wheelie Bin and Great Tunnel Ball Races

Inter-school competitions:

- Australia Rules
- Basketball
- Cricket
- Futsal
- Hockey
- Netball
- Rugby League
- Rugby Union
- Soccer
- Swimming
- Touch
- Volleyball

District (Port Curtis), Regional (Capricornia), State and Australian competitions:

- AFL
- Basketball
- Cricket
- Cross Country
- Football
- Golf
- Hockey
- Netball
- Rugby League
- Rugby Union
- Softball
- Squash
- Surfing
- Swimming
- Tennis
- Touch
- Track & Field
- Volleyball
- Water Polo

Sport representatives at School and State Levels for students with disabilities (AWD):

- Cross Country
- Swimming
- Track events: 100, 200, 400, 800, 1500, relay
- Field events: javelin, shotput, discus, long jump

=== Other activities ===
- ANZAC and other Returned Service celebrations
- Aspiring Talent and Achievement Program (ATAP); public speaking and group challenges for Indigenous students
- Aurecon Bridge Building Competition
- Bechtel Gladstone Region FIRST Tech Challenge
- Clean Up Australia Day
- Dreamtime Centre excursion; Indigenous and EAL/D students attend the Rockhampton Dreamtime Centre to learn about Indigenous history and culture
- Ecofest
- Energies Futures Workshop
- English competitions
- "Girlz with Purpose" program
- GSHS V.I.T.A.L. Program
- Harbour Festival Street Parade
- Harbour Watch Program
- It's All About ME
- Mathematics competitions
- NAIDOC Week
- National Recycling Week Clothing Swap
- National Youth Science Forum
- QUT Go Further Experience; a camp for Indigenous students in Years 9 and 10 to experience university life
- Red Shield Appeal
- Relay for Life
- Science competitions
- Science Olympiads
- Seniors' Week
- Shave for a Cure/Crazy Hair Day
- Shine Program
- Strength Program
- Tour de Chaplain bike ride
- Virtual Babies Program
- White Card Training (GAGAL)
- Year 11 and 12 CQU Science Challenge

== Notable alumni ==
- Kimberley Busteed, television presenter, model and beauty pageant holder who won Miss Universe Australia 2007 and represented Australia in the 2007 Miss Universe pageant
