= Gladstone, Queensland =

Gladstone
- City
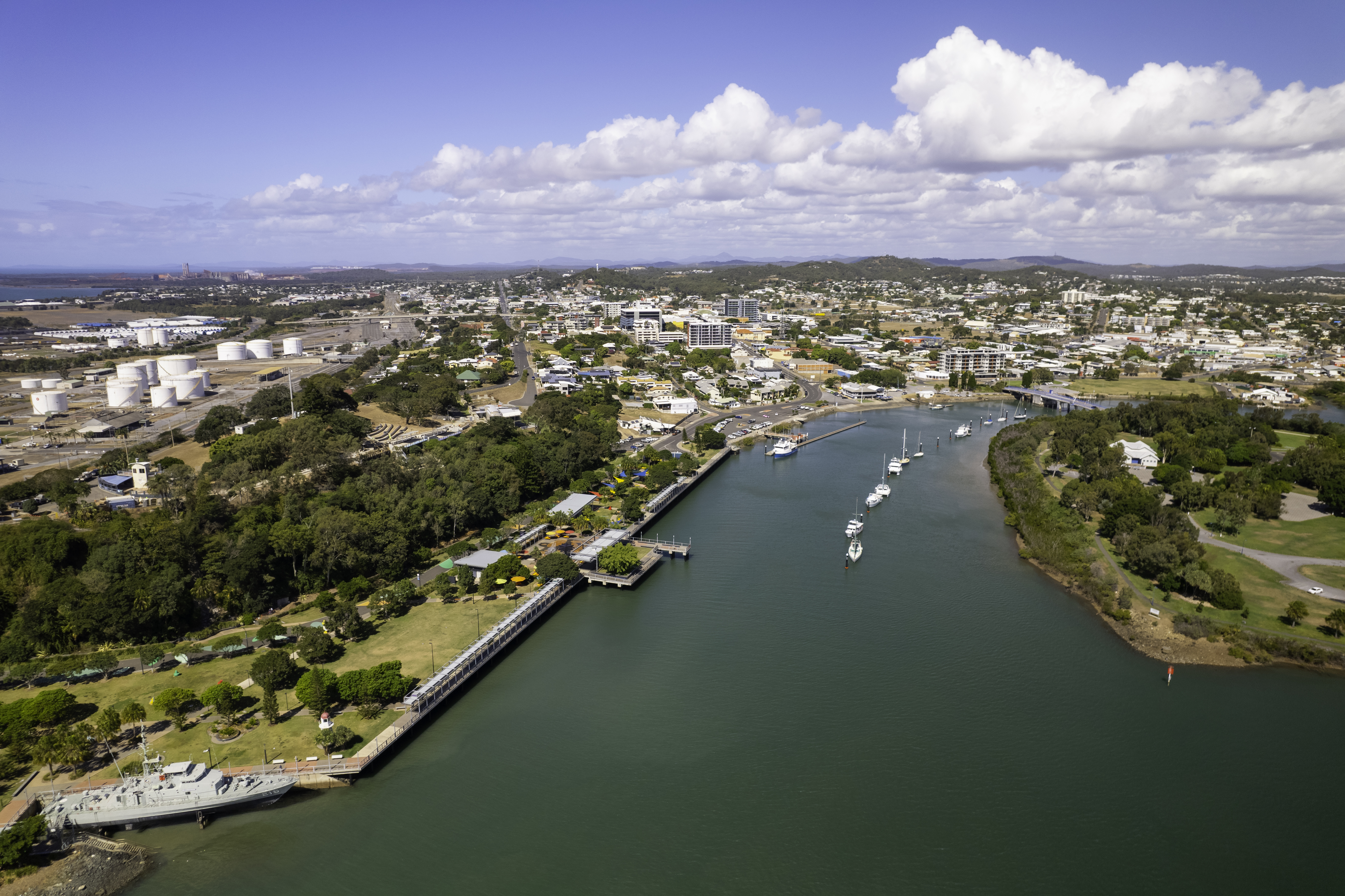
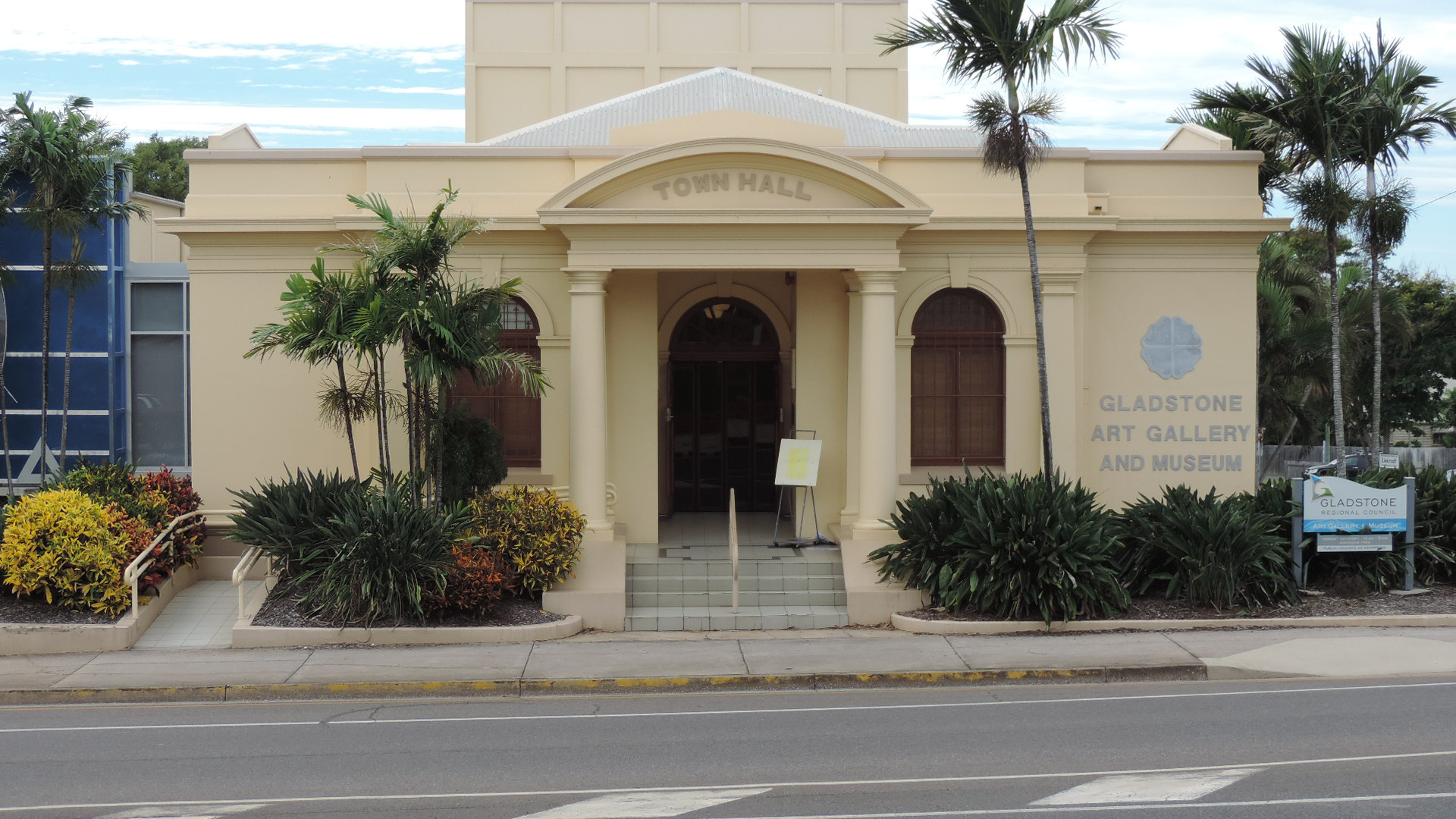
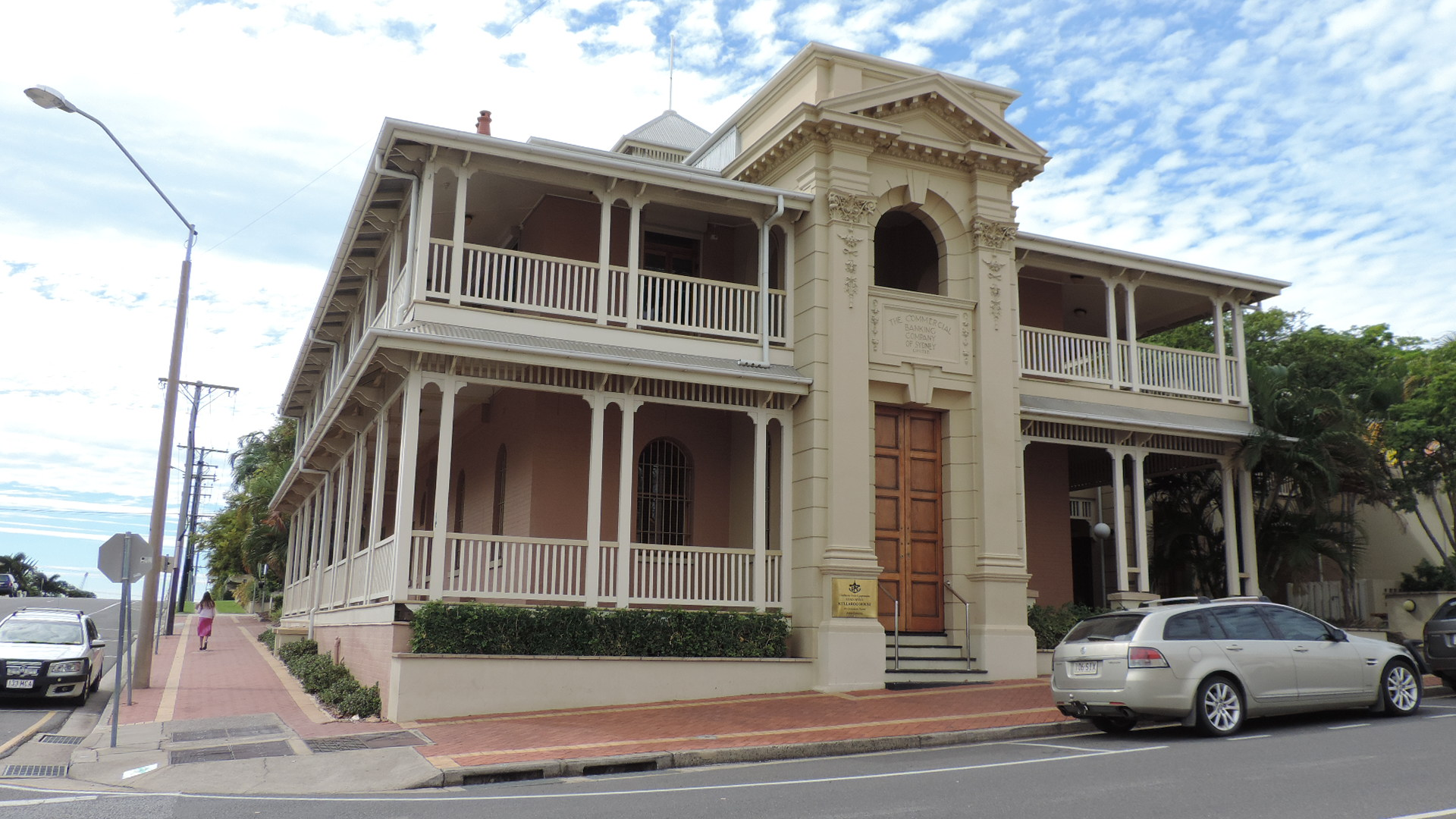
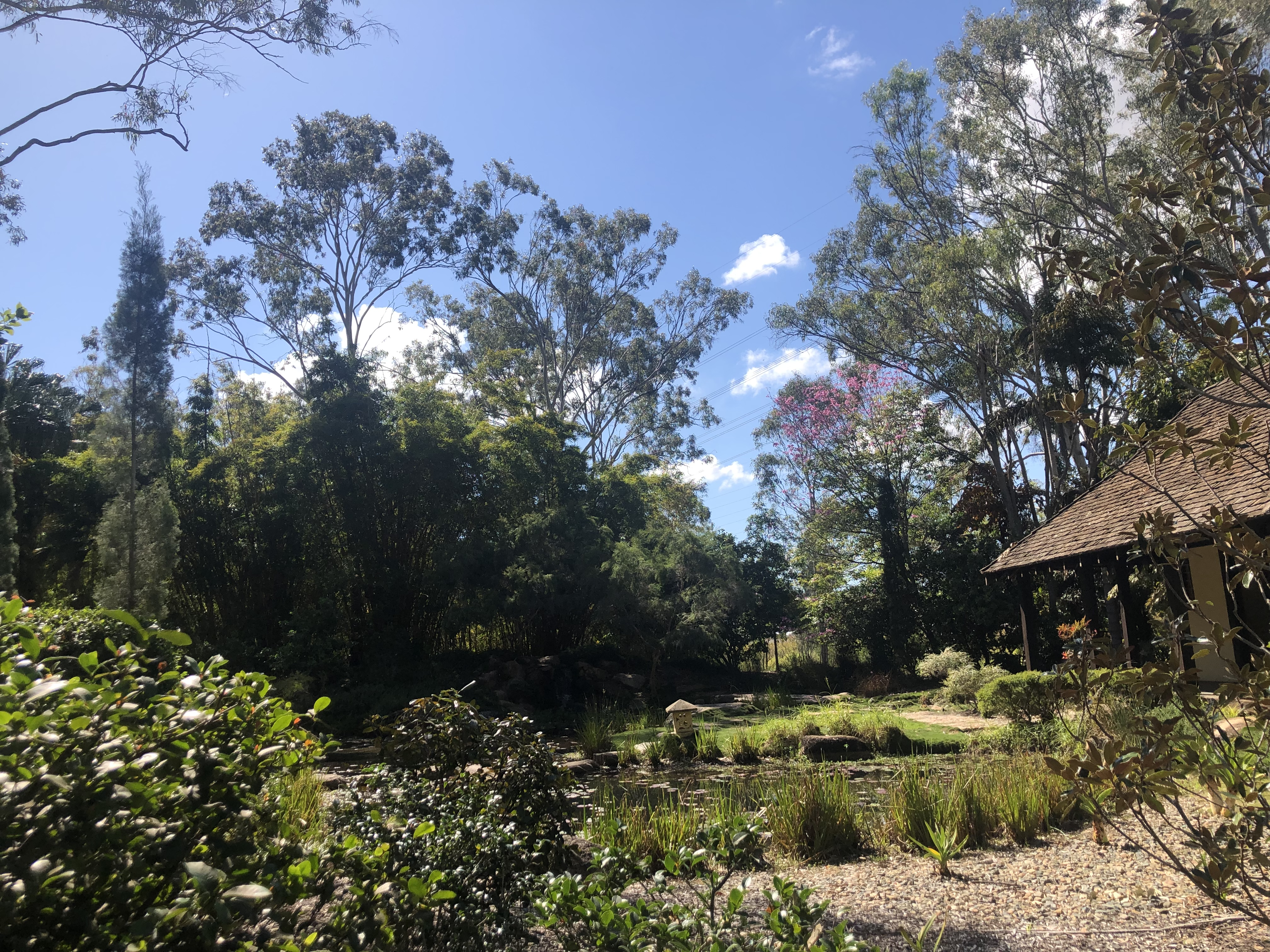
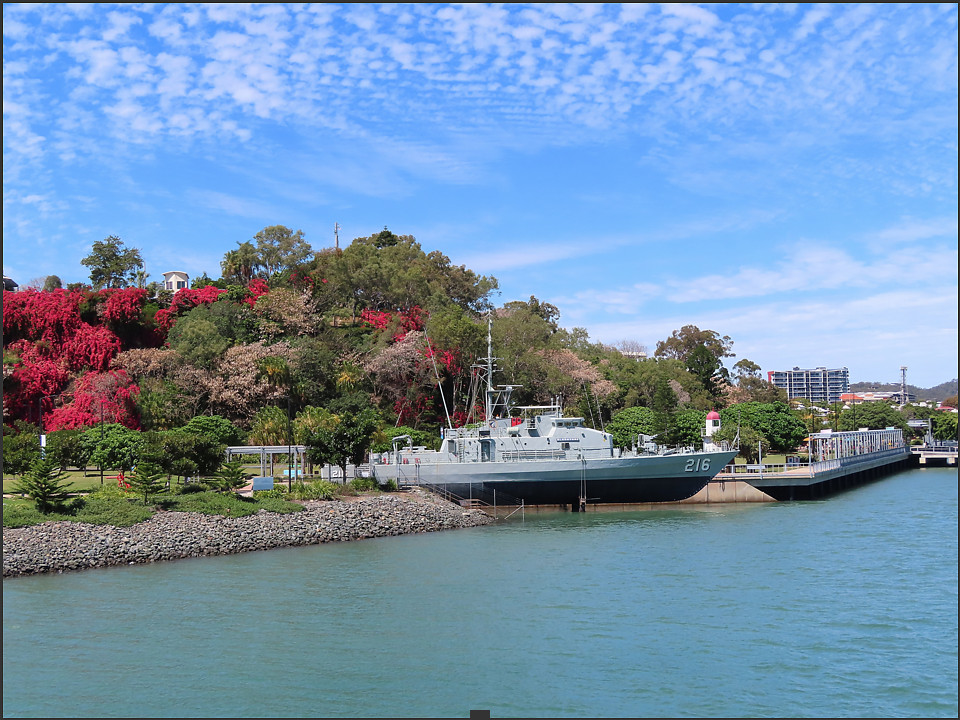
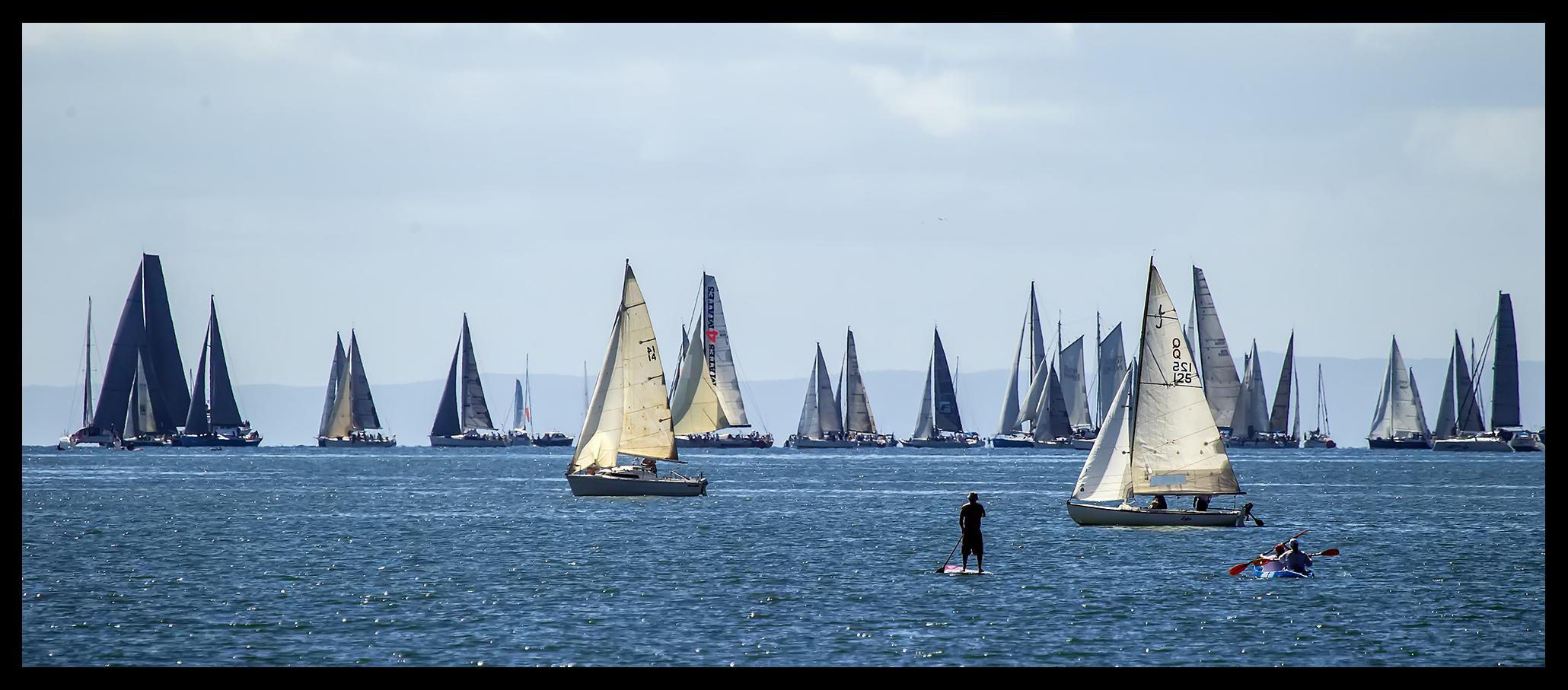
- View over the Gladstone CBD and Auckland Hill Gladstone Art Gallery and Museum Kullaroo House The Tondoon Botanic Gardens HMAS Gladstone museum Brisbane to Gladstone yacht race

- Coordinates: 23.8427°S 151.2555°E
- Country: Australia
- State: Queensland
- LGA: Gladstone Region
- Location: 108 km (67 mi) SE of Rockhampton; 186 km (116 mi) NW of Bundaberg; 517 km (321 mi) NNW of Brisbane
- Established: 1863

Government
  - State electorate: Gladstone
  - Federal division: Flynn

Population
  - Total: 45,185 (2021 census)
- Time zone: UTC+10:00 (AEST)
- Postcode: 4680
- Mean max temp: 27.7 °C (81.9 °F)
- Mean min temp: 18.5 °C (65.3 °F)
- Annual rainfall: 880.0 mm (34.65 in)

Gladstone (/ˈɡlædstən/ GLAD-stən) is a coastal city in the Gladstone Region, Queensland, Australia. In the 2021 census, the Gladstone urban area had a population of 45,185 people.

It is 517 km (321 mi) by road north-west of the state capital, Brisbane, and 108 km (67 mi) south-east of Rockhampton. Situated between the Calliope and Boyne Rivers, Gladstone is home to Queensland's largest multi-commodity shipping port, the Port of Gladstone.

Gladstone is the largest town within the Gladstone Region and the headquarters of Gladstone Regional Council is located in Gladstone.

== History ==
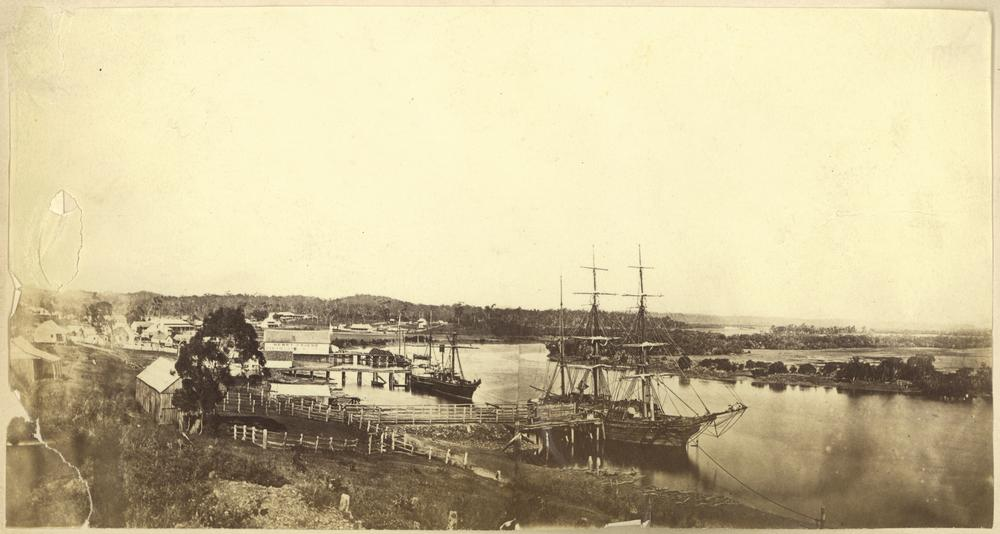
Ships moored at the docks at Gladstone, c. 1868

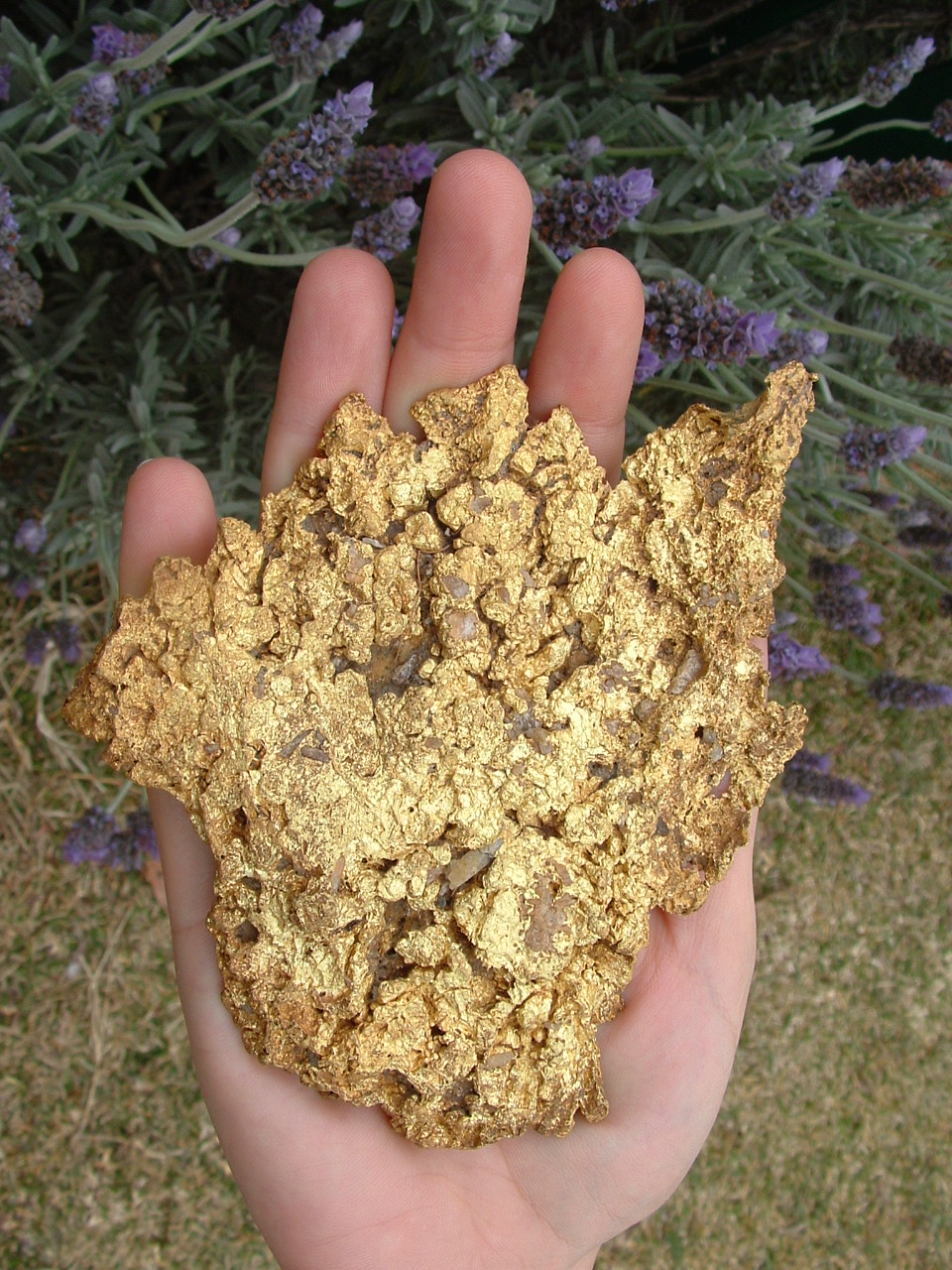
The Providence Nugget, found in Gladstone in 2004 with a metal detector

Before European settlement, the Gladstone region was home of the Gooreng Gooreng, Toolooa (or Tulua), Meerooni and Baiali (or Byellee) Aboriginal tribes.

In May 1770, HMS Endeavour, under the command of James Cook, sailed by the entrance to Gladstone Harbour under the cover of darkness. Matthew Flinders, during his 1801–1803 circumnavigation of Australia, became the first recorded European to sight the harbour in August 1802. He named the harbour Port Curtis, after Admiral Roger Curtis, a man who was of assistance to Flinders a year earlier at the Cape of Good Hope. John Oxley conducted further exploration of the harbour and surrounding countryside in November 1823. Oxley was dismissive of the region, noting the harbour was difficult to enter, the countryside was too dry, and the timber useless for construction purposes.

Nevertheless, in 1847 the British attempted to establish the new colony of North Australia at Port Curtis. Colonel George Barney was chosen to lead this experiment in colonisation and his expedition was eventful. On 25 January 1847, the Lord Auckland, carrying 87 soldiers and convicts, arrived off the southern entrance of Port Curtis and promptly ran aground on shoals off the southern tip of Facing Island. The settlers spent seven weeks on the island before being rescued by the supply ship Thomas Lowry and delivered the intended site of settlement, the region now known as Barney Point. On 30 January at a proclamation ceremony at Settlement Point on Facing Island, Barney was sworn in as Lieutenant Governor of the (already revoked) colony of North Australia. The convict settlement lasted barely two months and cost the Imperial government £15,000. A change of government in Britain ordered the withdrawal of Barney and the settlers.

By 1853, Francis MacCabe was surveying the site of a new town on the shores of Port Curtis under the protection of several detachments of Native Police. Maurice O'Connell was appointed government resident the following year, resulting in an influx of free settlers as land became available throughout the region.

Gladstone State School opened on 1 April 1861 and is one of the oldest state primary schools in Queensland. On 14 November 1968 it was renamed Gladstone Central State School.

In 1863, the town became a Municipality with William Henry Pershouse elected Gladstone's first mayor from 1864 to 1866. The fledgling town was named after the British Prime Minister William Ewart Gladstone and has a 19th-century marble statue on display in its town museum.

Development of Gladstone was slow until 1893 when a meatworks was established at Parsons Point.

Parson's Point Provisional School opened on 1 August 1898, becoming Parson's Point State School on 1 February 1913. The school was relocated and renamed Gladstone South State School in 1945.

On 2 March 1949, a major cyclone hit Gladstone, resulting in extensive damage to the town.

Gladstone State High School opened on 2 February 1953.

In 1963, Queensland Alumina Limited established its alumina refinery on the site of the old meatworks. Gladstone's port facilities were expanded and the city launched into an era of industrial development and economic prosperity.

Gladstone West State School opened on 24 January 1966. In the same year, Stella Maris College, now known as Chanel College was founded.

Rosella Park State School was opened on 17 May 1971.

Clinton State School opened on 29 January 1974.

Toolooa State High School opened on 27 January 1981.

Kin Kora State School opened on 9 October 1981.

In 1985 the Gladstone Christian Community School opened as a primary school operated by the Gladstone Baptist Church. In 1998, it changed its name to Trinity College. From 2013 it offered classes from Prep to Year 12.

St Stephens Lutheran College opened in 1998, but closed at the end of 2016. The school had lost 20% of its enrolment due to families moving away to find work, leaving only 216 students in classes ranging from Prep to Year 12 making it no longer viable to operate the school.

Gladstone Cinemas, a locally owned and operated independent cinema, opened in March 2001.

The Gladstone Library building opened in 2003.

=== Recognition of native title ===
Between the years 1997 and 1999, five separate applications were made seeking Native Title determinations regarding areas surrounding and including the cities of Bundaberg and Gladstone, on behalf of the first nations peoples, the Bailai, Gurang, Gooreng Gooreng and Taribelang Bunda. In 2001, the Federal Court of Australia combined these separate applications, and on 28 November 2017, Dowsett J made orders, stating that native title does exist over an area stretching from Burnett River watershed in the south, to the lower Fitzroy River in the north, and from the high-water mark on the adjacent coastline in the east, to the foothills of the Great Dividing Range in the west. The Bailai, Gurang, Gooreng Gooreng, Taribelang Bunda People's non-exclusive native title rights to this area was hence determined, and is held in trust for these peoples by their collective corporation, the RNTBC.

== Heritage listings ==
Gladstone has a number of heritage-listed sites, including:

- Gladstone Central State School, Block B, 94 Auckland Street
- Glengarry Homestead, Gladstone–Monto Road
- Our Lady Star of the Sea Church & School, Goondoon Street
- Port Curtis Sailing Club Clubhouse, 1 Goondoon Street
- Gladstone Post Office, 33 Goondoon Street
- Kullaroo House, 40 Goondoon Street
- Commonwealth Bank Building, 114 Goondoon Street
- Gladstone Regional Art Gallery and Museum (Old Town Hall), 144 Goondoon Street
- Fig Tree, Roseberry Street
- Port Curtis Co-operative Dairy Association Ltd Factory, 6 Short Street
- Gladstone Court House, 16 Yarroon Street
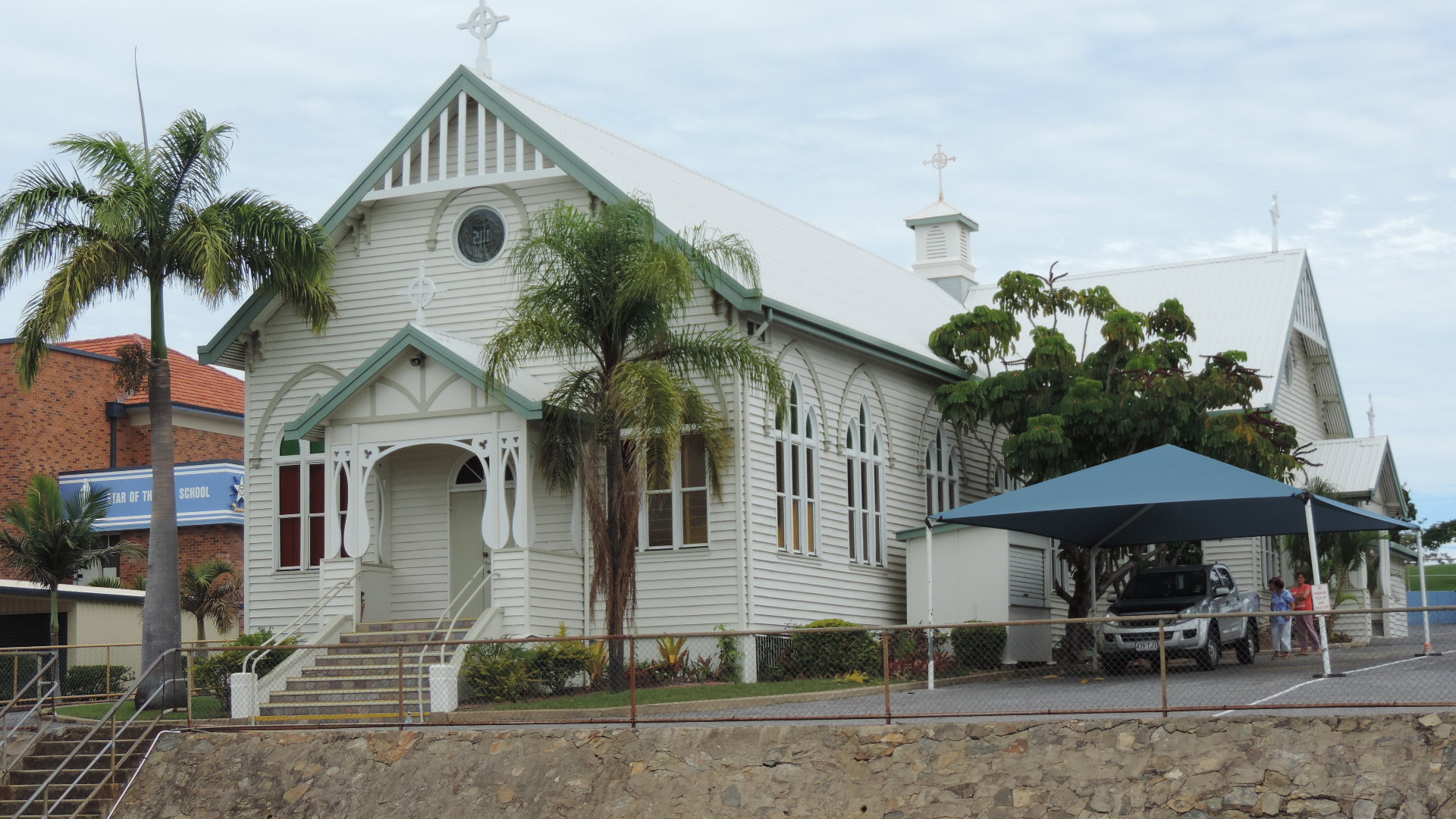
Our Lady Star of the Sea Catholic Church, 2014

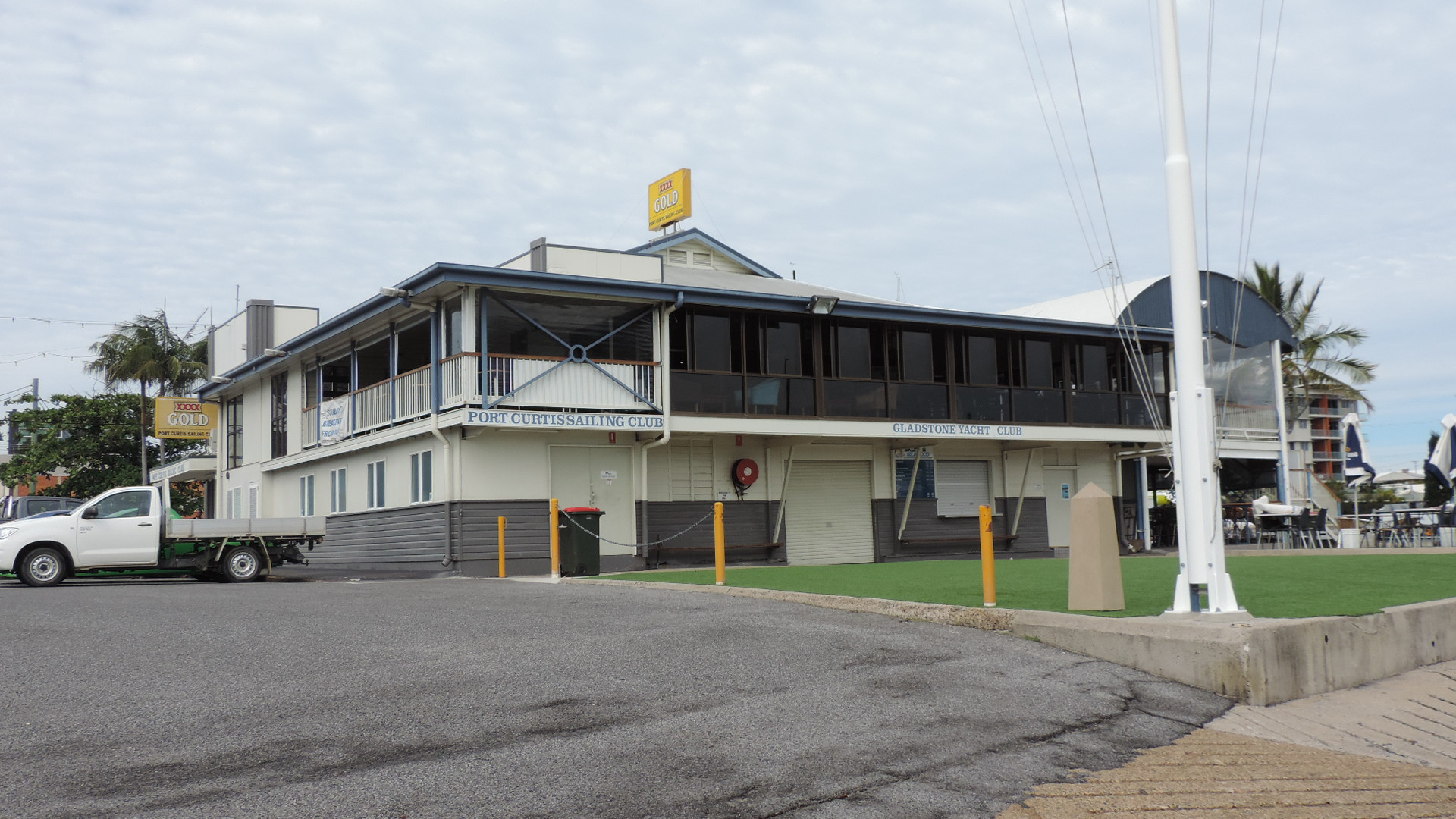
Port Curtis Sailing Club (view from Auckland Inlet), 2014

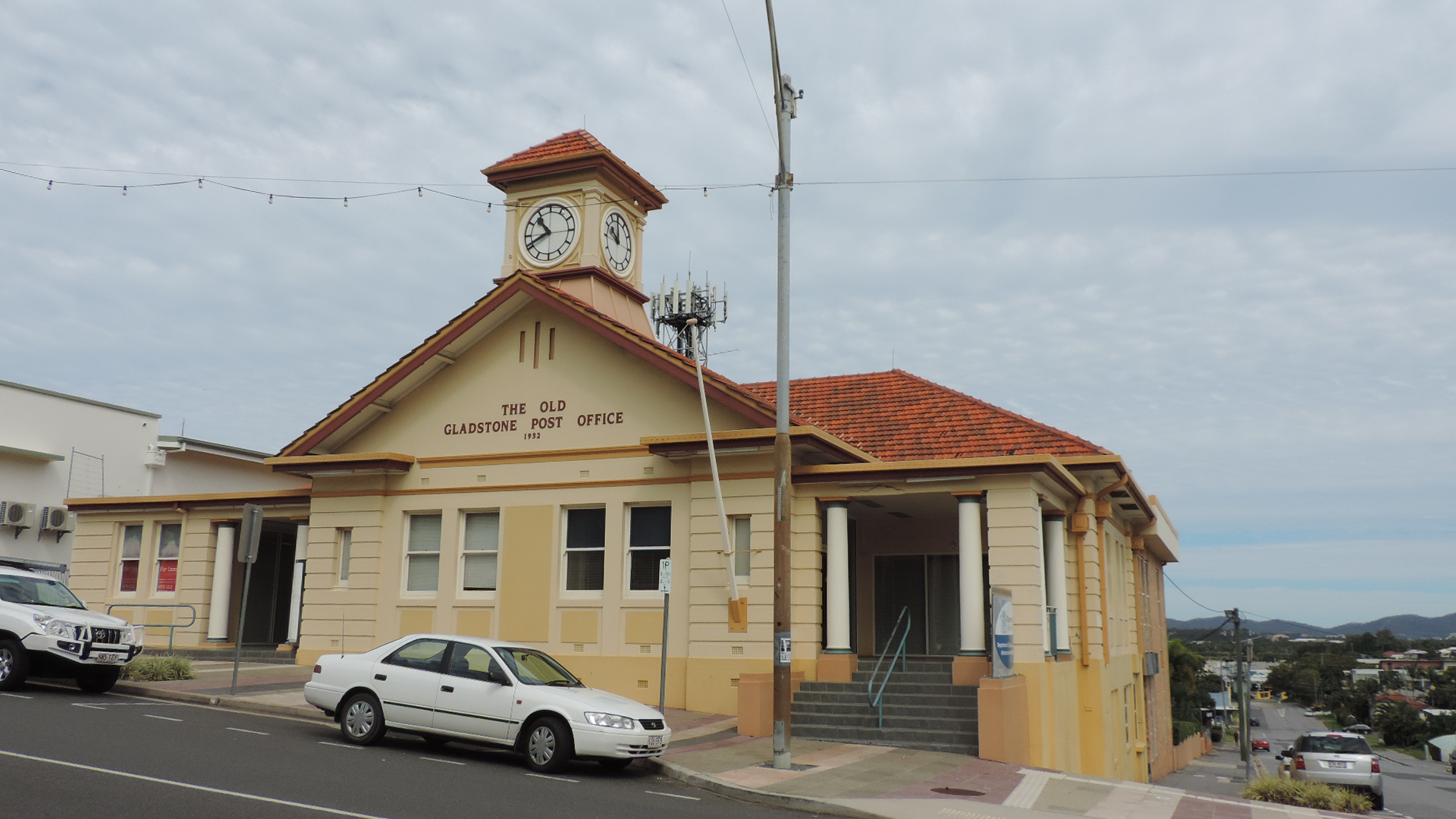
Old Gladstone Post Office, 2014

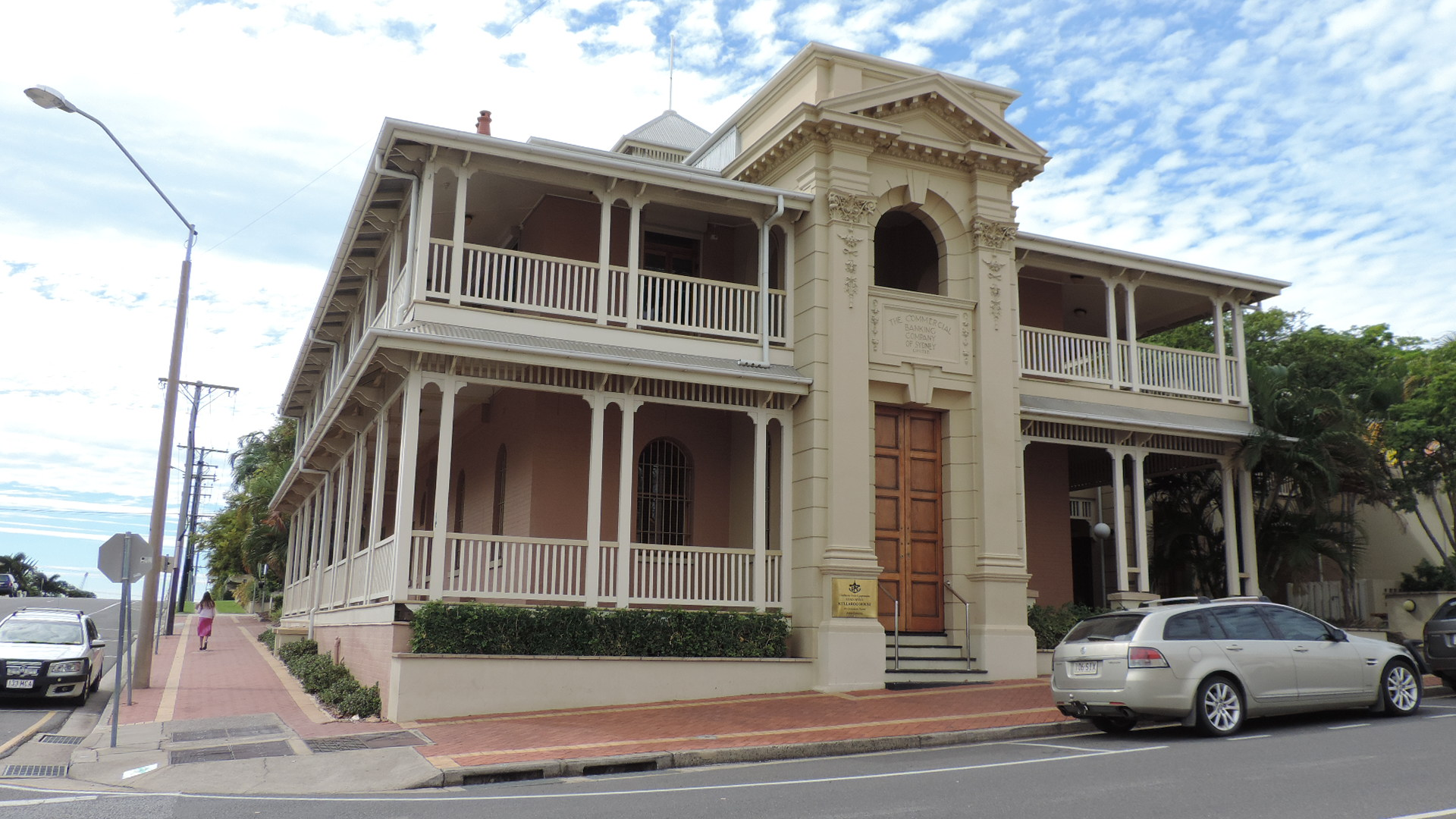
Kullaroo House, 2014

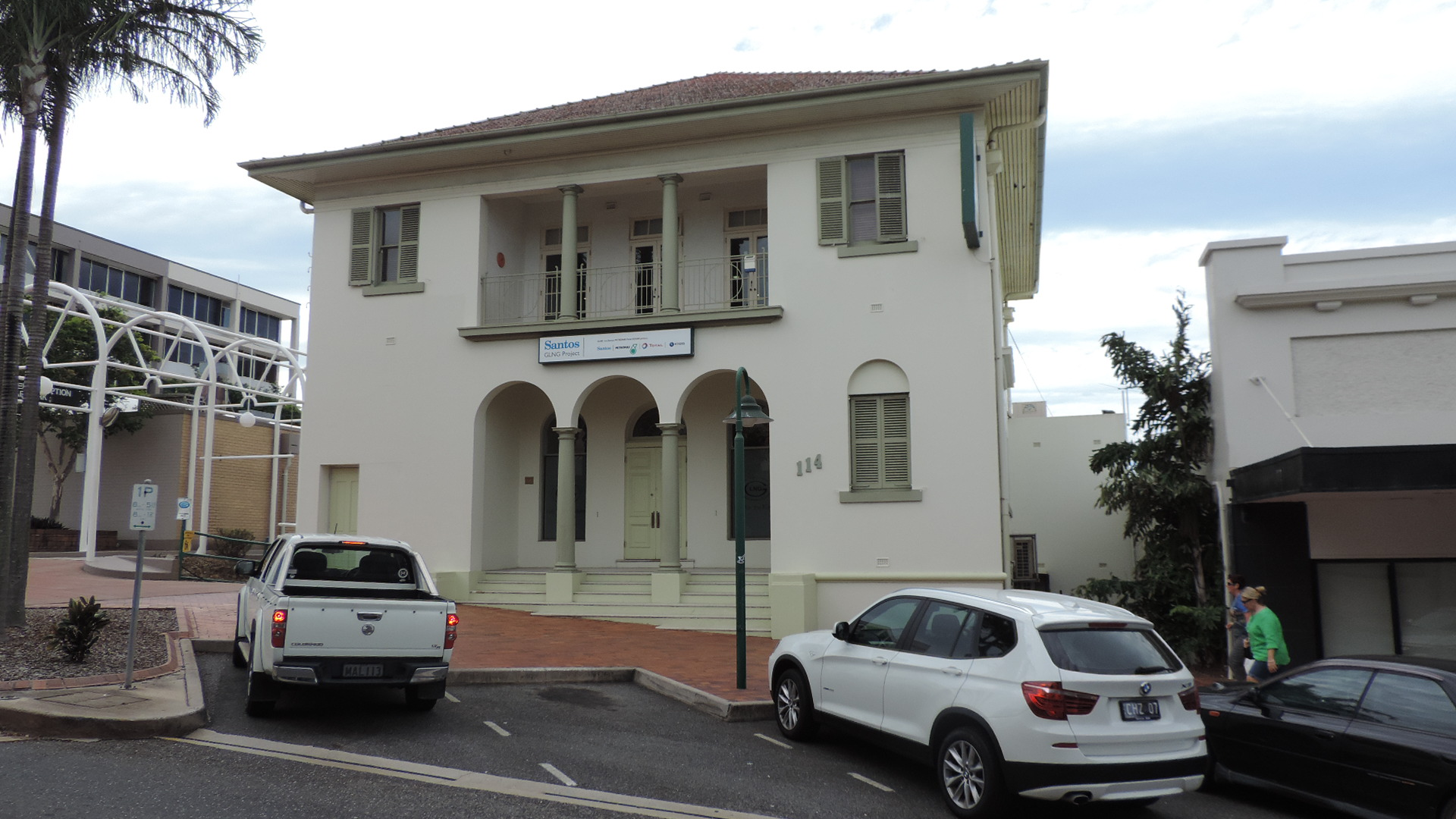
Former Commonwealth Bank, 2014

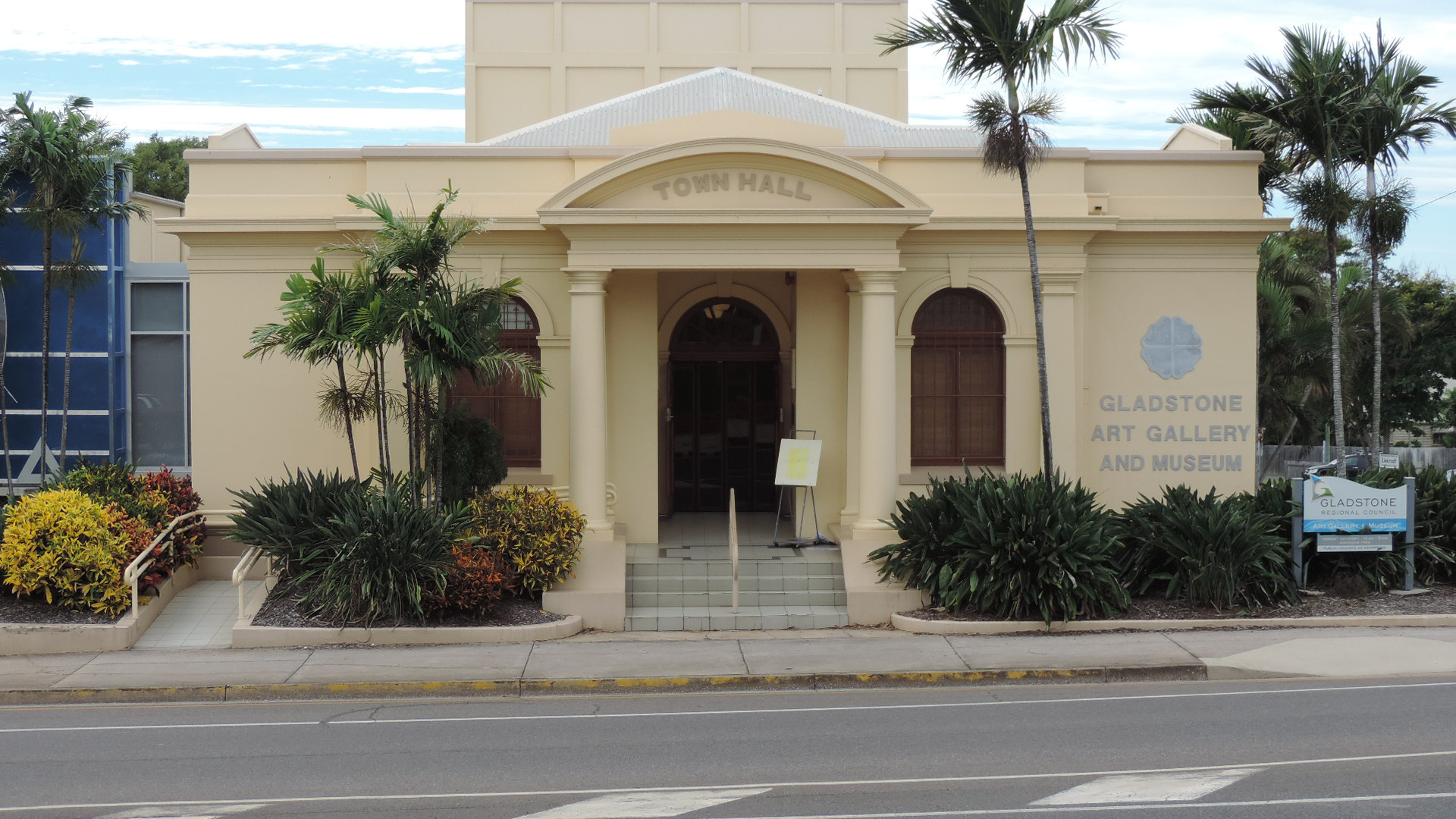
Gladstone Regional Art Gallery and Museum (Old Town Hall), 2014

== Demographics ==
According to the 2021 census of population, there were 45,185 people in the Gladstone urban area.

- Aboriginal and Torres Strait Islander people made up 6.7% of the population.
- 79.3% of people were born in Australia. The next most common countries of birth were New Zealand 3.3%, England 2.2%, the Philippines 1.3% and South Africa 1.4%.
- 87.0% of people only spoke English at home. Other languages spoken at home included Tagalog 0.8%, Filipino 0.7%, Afrikaans 0.7%, Spanish 0.3% and Hindi 0.3%.
- The most common responses for religion were No Religion 46.1%, Catholic 17.1% and Anglican 11.6%.

== Geography ==
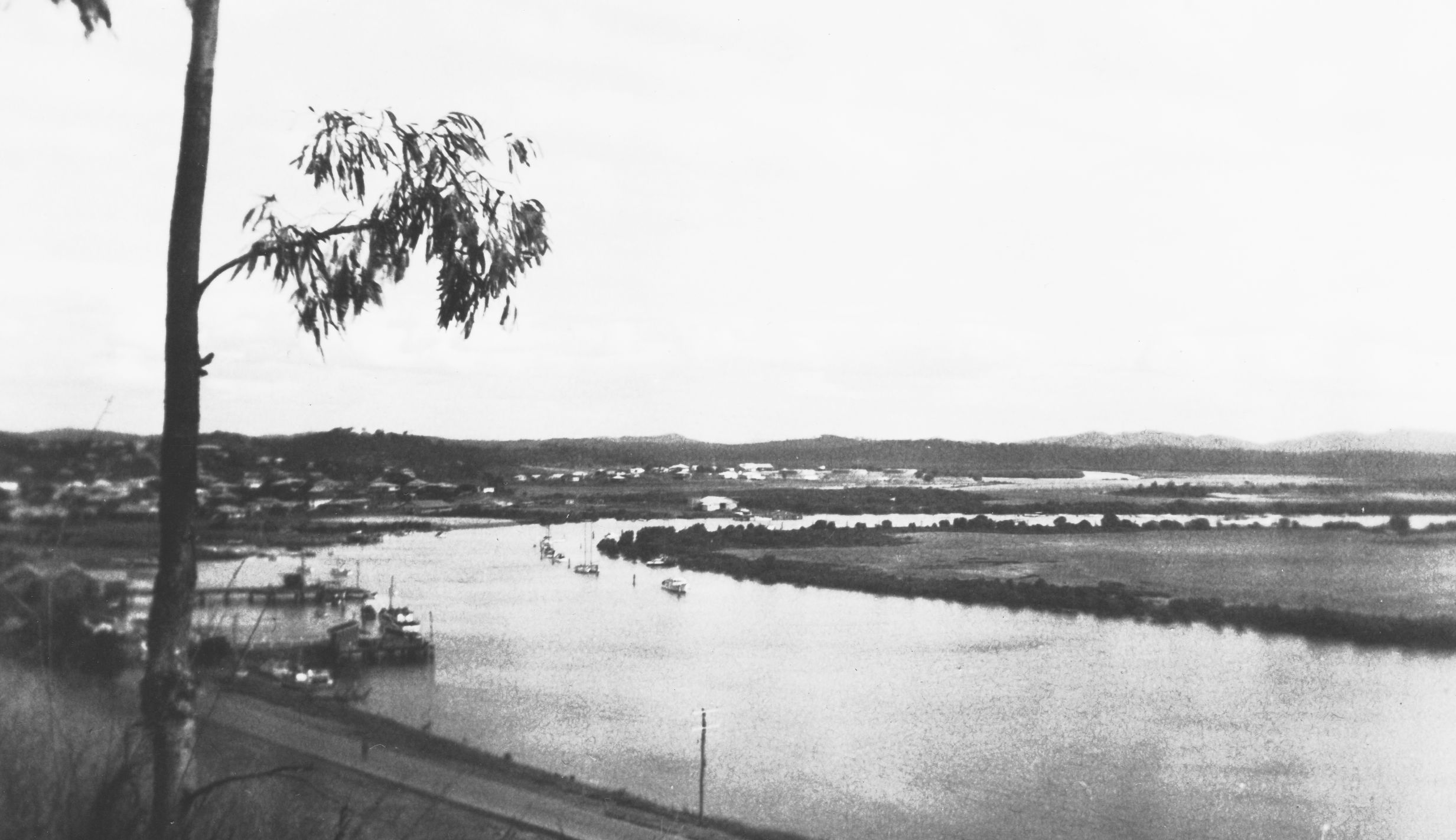
1950s view across Auckland Inlet before construction of power station

Gladstone and Rockhampton are the two major cities in the Central Queensland region.

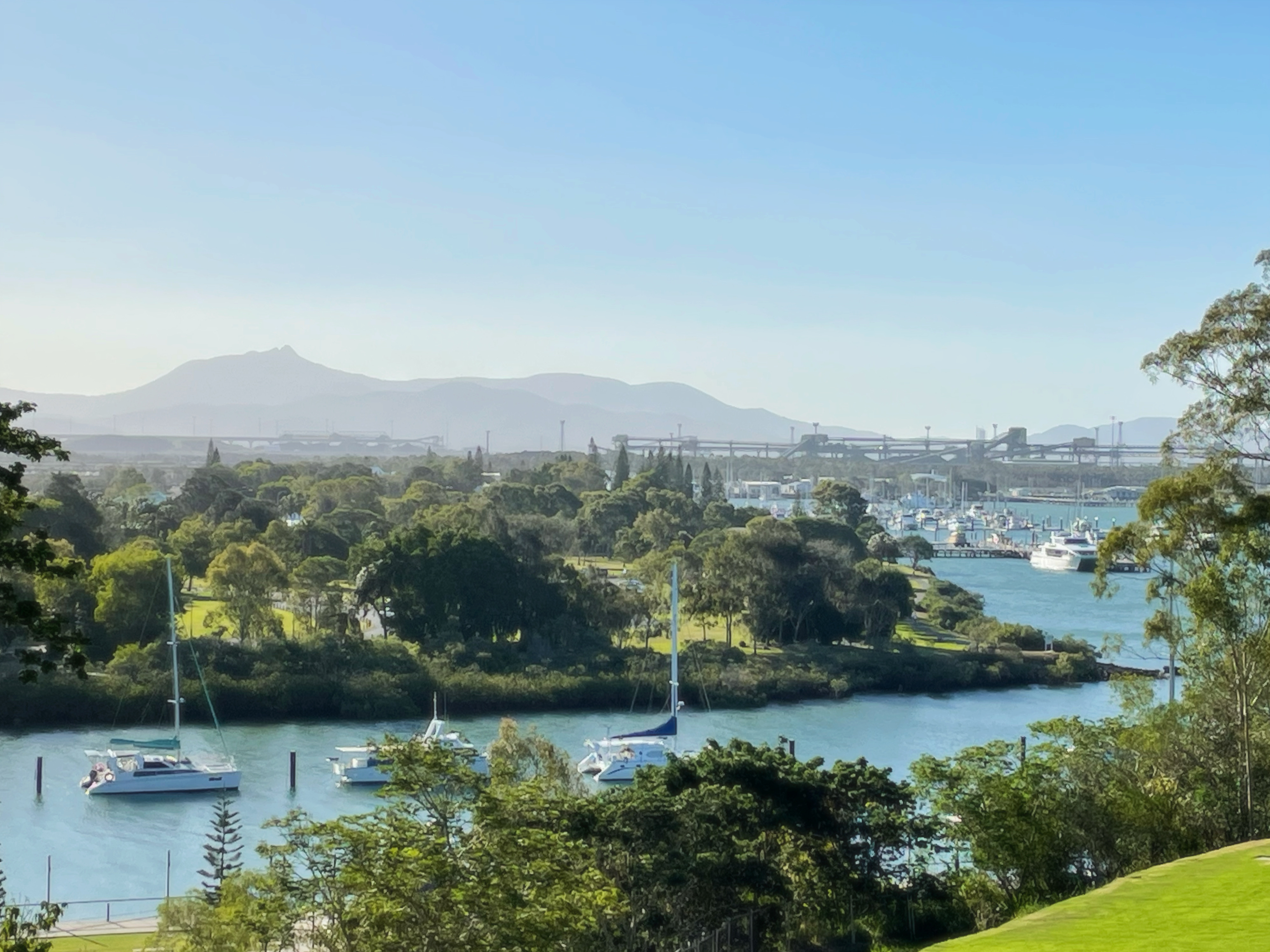
Gladstone Marina with Mt Larcom in background (2020)

=== Suburbs ===
- Gladstone Central^{*}
- Barney Point
- Callemondah
- Clinton
- Glen Eden
- Kin Kora
- Kirkwood
- New Auckland
- O'Connell
- South Gladstone
- South Trees
- Sun Valley
- Telina
- Toolooa
- West Gladstone

^{*} – the historic centre of the city and major business district

=== Climate ===
Gladstone experiences a tropical savannah climate (Koppen: Aw), with a wet season from October to March and a dry season from April to September. Moderated by Coral Sea, the town is one of the southernmost places in Australia to have this classification. The average annual rainfall is 874.0 millimetres (34.41 in), with a summer maximum. Extreme temperatures in Gladstone have ranged from 4.4 °C (39.9 °F) on 13 July 1960 to 42.0 °C (107.6 °F) on 12 March 2007.

Climate data for Gladstone Radar (23º51'36"S, 151º15'36"E, 75 m AMSL) (normals 1991-2020, extremes 1957-2026)
Month	Jan	Feb	Mar	Apr	May	Jun	Jul	Aug	Sep	Oct	Nov	Dec	Year
Record high °C (°F)	39.7 (103.5)	40.1 (104.2)	42.0 (107.6)	34.4 (93.9)	33.2 (91.8)	30.1 (86.2)	29.4 (84.9)	31.6 (88.9)	33.9 (93.0)	40.0 (104.0)	40.1 (104.2)	39.8 (103.6)	42.0 (107.6)
Mean daily maximum °C (°F)	31.8 (89.2)	31.4 (88.5)	30.5 (86.9)	28.6 (83.5)	26.0 (78.8)	23.8 (74.8)	23.5 (74.3)	24.8 (76.6)	27.1 (80.8)	28.6 (83.5)	30.5 (86.9)	31.4 (88.5)	28.2 (82.7)
Mean daily minimum °C (°F)	22.8 (73.0)	22.8 (73.0)	21.9 (71.4)	19.8 (67.6)	17.1 (62.8)	14.7 (58.5)	13.9 (57.0)	14.6 (58.3)	17.0 (62.6)	18.9 (66.0)	20.7 (69.3)	22.1 (71.8)	18.9 (65.9)
Record low °C (°F)	14.8 (58.6)	17.2 (63.0)	16.2 (61.2)	11.0 (51.8)	8.5 (47.3)	6.1 (43.0)	4.4 (39.9)	4.7 (40.5)	9.6 (49.3)	10.9 (51.6)	14.7 (58.5)	15.6 (60.1)	4.4 (39.9)
Average precipitation mm (inches)	144.8 (5.70)	139.1 (5.48)	111.7 (4.40)	39.2 (1.54)	37.4 (1.47)	36.5 (1.44)	26.8 (1.06)	29.8 (1.17)	29.6 (1.17)	60.0 (2.36)	50.4 (1.98)	110.9 (4.37)	814.9 (32.08)
Average precipitation days (≥ 1.0 mm)	7.9	7.8	6.6	3.8	4.4	3.8	2.9	2.6	2.7	4.9	5.0	6.9	59.3
Average afternoon relative humidity (%)	64	65	61	60	58	56	53	54	58	60	60	62	59
Average dew point °C (°F)	21.4 (70.5)	21.5 (70.7)	19.8 (67.6)	17.6 (63.7)	14.7 (58.5)	12.2 (54.0)	10.8 (51.4)	11.9 (53.4)	14.7 (58.5)	17.1 (62.8)	18.5 (65.3)	20.3 (68.5)	16.7 (62.1)
Source: Bureau of Meteorology (1991-2020 normals and 1957–2026 extremes)

== Industry ==
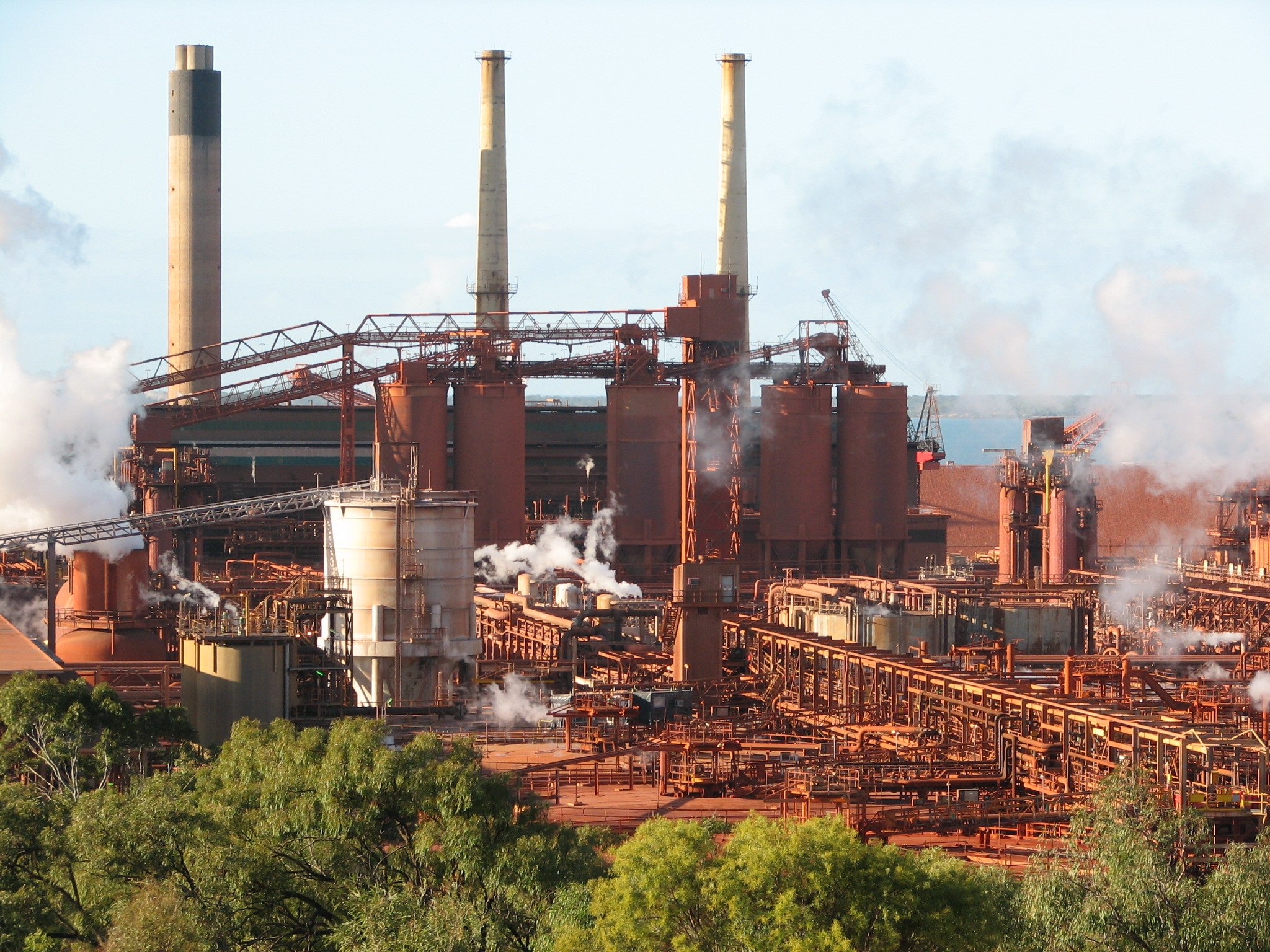
Qld Alumina Refinery

Gladstone's primary industries are mining-related. The Port of Gladstone is the fifth-largest multi-commodity port in Australia and the world's fourth-largest coal-exporting terminal. The port consists of a number of wharves and terminal facilities. Boyne Wharf is used by the Boyne Island aluminium smelter and was opened in August 1982. The western harbour basin has been expanded, primarily to allow increased exports of liquified natural gas (LNG). Furthermore, in 2016, a plant was constructed on Curtis Island to produce and export LNG, a construction project that contributed heavily to city's population and housing boom. Major exports include coal, alumina, aluminium, cement products, sodium cyanide and ammonium nitrate. Each year 50 million tonnes of coal passes through the port, making up 70% of the total exports.

Gladstone harbour is within the World Heritage Area of the Great Barrier Reef and has historically supported a thriving seafood industry. In August 2011, a Fisheries Queensland spokesman said they received reports of fish with milky eyes. A spokesman from the Gladstone Fish Markets claimed that diseased fish were still being caught in large numbers in November 2011. Losses to the local seafood industry have been estimated at A$36 million a year.

Gladstone is also a tourism destination, with cruise ships regularly docking at the port.

== Education ==
Gladstone has a range of primary schools and secondary schools.

Gladstone Central State School is a government primary (P–6) school for boys and girls at 74 Auckland Street. In 2017, the school had an enrolment of 342 students with 24 teachers (22 full-time equivalent) and 16 non-teaching staff (12 full-time equivalent).

Gladstone West State School is a government primary (P–6) school for boys and girls at Boles Street, West Gladstone. In 2017 the school had an enrolment of 647 students with 46 teachers (43 full-time equivalent) and 31 non-teaching staff (20 full-time equivalent).

Gladstone South State School is a government primary (P–6) school for boys and girls at 153 Toolooa Street, South Gladstone. In 2017 the school had an enrolment of 330 students with 22 teacher (20 full-time equivalent) and 24 non-teaching staff (16 full-time equivalent).

Clinton State School is a government primary (P–6) school for boys and girls at Harvey Street, Clinton. In 2017 the school had an enrolment of 912 students with 64 teachers (59 full-time equivalent) and 46 non-teaching staff (28 full-time equivalent).

Kin Kora State School is a government primary (P–6) school for boys and girls at 43 Hibiscus Avenue, Kin Kora. In 2017 the school had an enrolment of 801 students with 57 teachers (51 full-time equivalent) and 27 non-teaching staff (19 full-time equivalent).

Rosella Park School is a government school for boys and girls aged from five to eighteen years who have moderate to severe intellectual impairments at 20 Park Street (corner of Rosella Street), West Gladstone. In 2017 the school had an enrolment of 75 students with 20 teachers (19 full-time equivalent) and 30 non-teaching staff (19 full-time equivalent). Due to the specialised nature of the school, its students are drawn from all over Gladstone and beyond into the wider Gladstone Region.

Gladstone State High School is a government secondary (7–12) school for boys and girls at 30 Dawson Road, West Gladstone. In 2017 the school had an enrolment of 1509 students with 123 teachers (115 full-time equivalent) and 61 non-teaching staff (45 full-time equivalent).

Toolooa State High School is a government secondary (7–12) school for boys and girls at 2 Phillip Street, South Gladstone. In 2018 the school had an enrolment of 1,004 students with 85 teachers (79 full-time equivalent) and 51 non-teaching staff (33 full-time equivalent).

It has two main private schools: St Johns and Trinity College.

It also has a university campus, Central Queensland University. Gladstone was also formerly home to CQIT (TAFE) Gladstone Campus, although has since transitioned to a secondary campus for Trinity College's K-12 offering.

== Community facilities ==
The Gladstone Regional Council operates Gladstone Library at 39 Goondoon Street, Gladstone.

The Gladstone branch of the Queensland Country Women's Association meets at the QCWA Hall at 88 Oaka Lane, Gladstone Central.

== Recreation ==
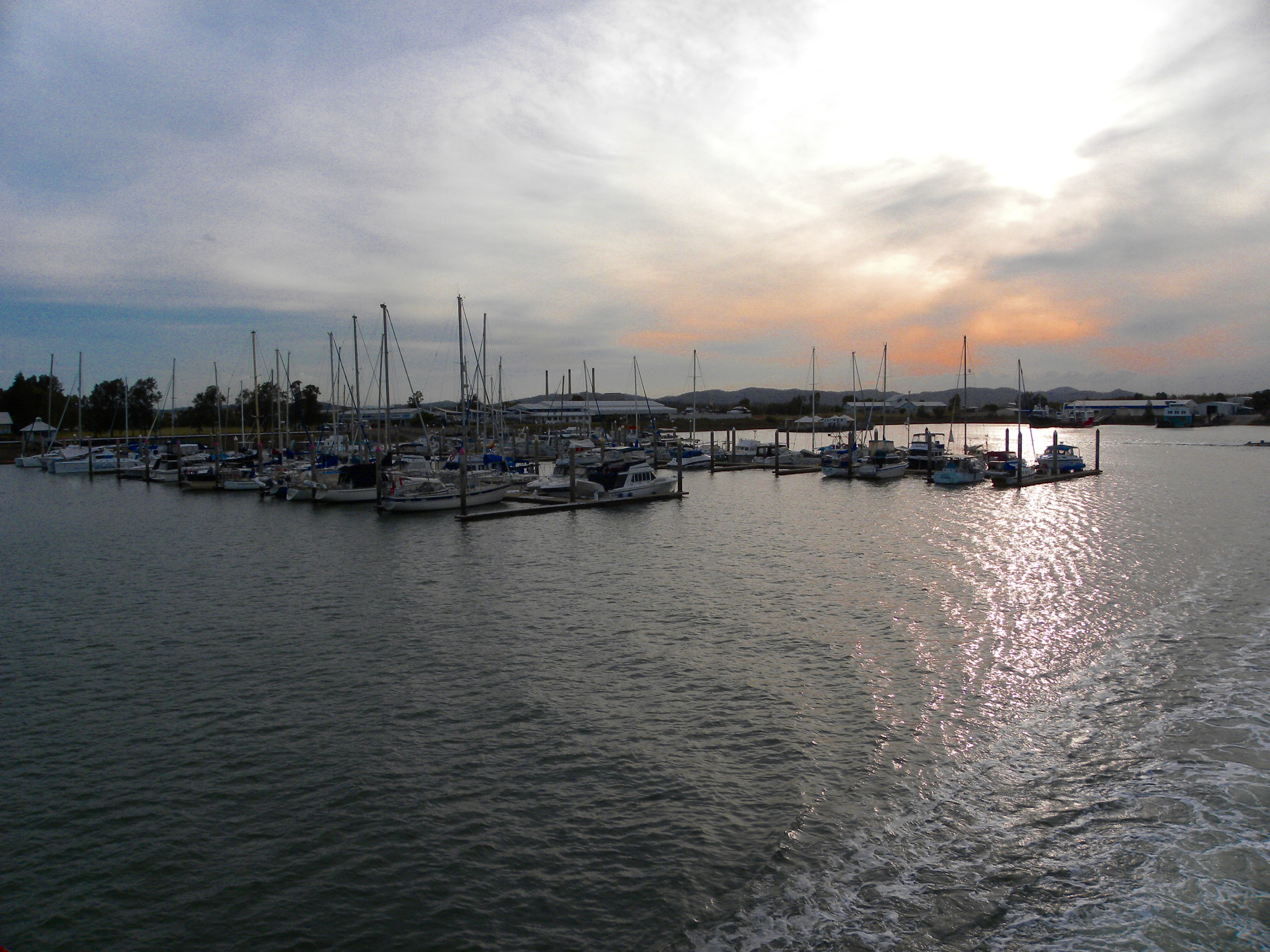
Sunset from the Gladstone Marina

Gladstone has direct access to Heron Island, Wilson Island, Curtis Island and other islands from the marina and local airstrips.

=== Boyne Island and Tannum Sands ===
Boyne Island and Tannum Sands have grown in popularity because of the beaches and lifestyle. The Millennium Esplanade is popular destination with shelters, barbecues and walking paths available to the general public. Boyne Island and Tannum Sands are not part of the Gladstone township but are part of the Gladstone region and formerly part of the Calliope Shire.

=== Lake Awoonga ===
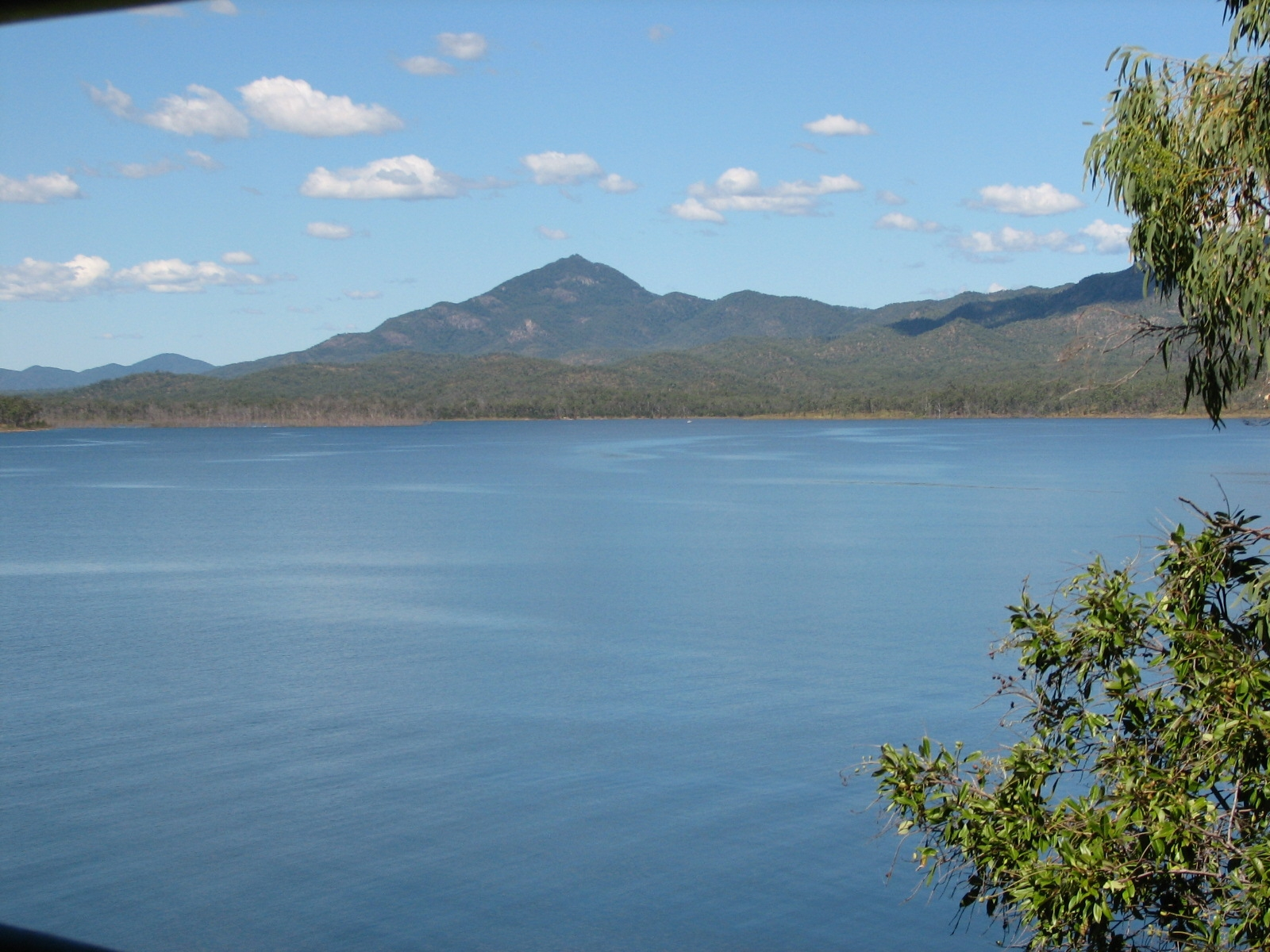
Lake Awoonga

A little further afield (25 km south of Gladstone) is Lake Awoonga. The recreation area has free barbecues, swimming, landscaped walking trails, as well as a caravan park. The lake has been stocked with several fish species since 1996, and over 2 million barramundi have been released. In addition to the fishing, Lake Awoonga has many natural attractions, especially the wildlife, with more than 225 species of birds (or over 27% of Australia's bird species) found in the region. Lake Awoonga is also the primary source of Gladstone's water supply. Awoonga dam is not part of the Gladstone township but is part of the Gladstone region and formerly part of the Calliope Shire.

== Politics ==
In the House of Representatives, Gladstone is located within the division of Flynn, a traditionally marginal seat currently held by Liberal National MP Colin Boyce, who was first elected in 2022. At the state level, it is within the electorate of Gladstone, and is a safe Labor seat held by Glenn Butcher, who has represented it since the 2015 Queensland state election.

== Transport ==
The Dawson Highway originates in Gladstone, and it runs westwards for approximately 400 km (250 mi) to Springsure.

=== Rail ===
Gladstone is a major stop on the North Coast railway line, with long-distance passenger trains operated by QR Traveltrain stopping in the area. Gladstone is also the transshipping point for export coal from the Moura and Blackwater coal basins and is one of the largest coal export ports in The Southern Hemisphere. Currently, coal trains of up to 1.7 km in length and 10,600 tonnes' gross weight are run by rail operators Aurizon and Pacific National to unload at coal terminals at Barney Point, Clinton, and Yarwun. Domestic coal is also railed to the Gladstone Power Station and the Queensland Alumina Limited refinery. An extensive rail facility is located at Callemondah to support these operations.

Gladstone was also a major terminus for rail freight and bulk fuel, with extensive marshaling yards at Gladstone, South Gladstone, and Auckland Point. As is the case in much of Queensland this traffic, declining from the 1990s, has now ceased with goods carried by road.

=== Air ===
Gladstone Airport is located in the western suburbs of Gladstone about 6 km (3.7 mi) (8-minute drive) from the centre of the city.

The main provider of scheduled passenger air services has been QantasLink, using mostly Bombardier Q400 aircraft. Flight West and Ansett previously offered service. Air Australia briefly offered services in 2011 and Virgin Australia commenced flights in October 2011 and now offers up to 6 return flights a day to Brisbane mostly on ATR 72 aircraft with Embraer 190 and Boeing 737 also a regular appearance in the schedule. New players JetGo started flying direct services from Sydney in December 2014. The service was offered twice daily, in 36-seat Embraer 135LR jets but ceased in February 2015.

In May 2009, a $65 million upgrade to the airport and nearby area was undertaken, which reached completion in 2011.

=== Sea ===
The Port of Gladstone is Queensland's largest multi-commodity port and the fifth-largest multi-commodity port in Australia. It is the world's fourth-largest coal-exporting terminal.

== Media ==
=== News publications ===
Gladstone has a free fortnightly independent community newspaper called Gladstone News, delivered to 220 business hotspots and community points.

=== Radio ===
4CC is Gladstone's local AM commercial radio station, owned by Grant Broadcasters. 4CC has one full-time announcer based in Gladstone to present the station's local breakfast show. The station broadcasts to Central Queensland on four separate frequencies via three AM transmitters in Gladstone, Biloela and Rockhampton, and an FM translator in Agnes Water on the Discovery Coast.

Hit Central Queensland is Gladstone's local FM commercial radio station, owned by Southern Cross Austereo. Hot FM has two full-time announcers based in Gladstone to present the station's flagship weekday breakfast program, which is also broadcast to Rockhampton and Emerald.

Gladstone also receives radio stations that carry local programming from Rockhampton including commercial radio stations Triple M Central Queensland and 4RO. Triple M broadcasts on a separate FM frequency in Gladstone.

ABC Capricornia also broadcasts into Gladstone from Rockhampton, using a separate FM frequency. Until November 2014, ABC Capricornia maintained a local news bureau in Gladstone where a local journalist was based to cover the Gladstone region. Some local news bulletins on ABC Capricornia were also broadcast live from Gladstone. However, in what was a controversial decision, the ABC's Gladstone office was permanently closed in late 2014 as a cost-cutting measure following the Federal Government's decision to withdraw $254 million in funding to the ABC.

91.9 Fresh FM is Gladstone's local community radio radio station, which has a Christian radio format.

=== Television ===
WIN Television, Seven Queensland, Network 10, ABC and SBS stations are all able to be received in Gladstone.

The Central Queensland editions of WIN News and Seven News, both regularly feature news content directly relating to the Gladstone region. Seven Queensland employ a journalist and camera operator in Gladstone, while WIN Television dispatch a news crew from Rockhampton to cover news stories in Gladstone.

The weekly 'What's On' segment on Seven News is also presented from Gladstone.

== Sports teams ==
The city hosted an NRL game in Round 5 of the 2018 NRL season between the Gold Coast Titans and Manly Warringah Sea Eagles, which attracted a sell-out crowd of 5,135 to Marley Brown Oval. The local competition is the Gladstone District Rugby League. Local sports teams include:

- Gladstone PCYC Roller Derby: Gladstone Hustlers, Gladstone Haul Stars
- Australian rules football / AFL Capricornia: Gladstone Suns.
- Cricket / Gladstone Cricket Inc.: Gladstone Brothers, The Glen, Yaralla
- Basketball / Queensland Basketball League: Gladstone Port City Power (Men's) and (Women's)
- Soccer / FQPL 3 Central Coast: Central FC, Clinton FC, Boyne Tannum FC
- Soccer / Gladstone Senior Mens: Central FC, Clinton FC, Gladstone United FC, Boyne Tannum FC, Yaralla FC, Calliope FC
- Rugby league / Gladstone District Rugby League: Past Brothers, Valleys, Wallabys
- Rugby union / Central QLD Rugby Union: Gladstone RUFC
- Volleyball / Volleyball Queensland: Gladstone Thunder

== Notable residents ==
- James Henry Ashton (1819–1889) – founder of Ashton's Circus, died and buried in Gladstone
- William Robert (Bill) Golding (1890–1985) – builder, historian, local government councillor, local government head, public servant, public service head.
- Percival Albert Gourgaud (1881–1958) – public servant, public servant head.
- Gary Larson (b. 1967) – Former Queensland and Australian Rugby League player.
- Henry John (Jack) Manning (1889–1978) – company managing director, journalist, newspaper executive, newspaper owner.
- Hayley Marsten (b. 1994) – awarded country singer/songwriter.
- Frederick Woolnough Paterson (1897–1977) – barrister, communist, farmer, local government councillor, Member of Lower House, school teacher, soldier.
- Valentine Thomas Vallis (1916–2006) – poet, opera critic, university reader, soldier, local government counter clerk

== Sister city ==
As part of Sister Cities Australia Inc. (SCA) the Gladstone Region began a Sister City relationship with Saiki City, Oita Prefecture, Japan in 1996.

== See also ==
- Gladstone road network
- Beautiful Betsy
- The Boyne Valley
- Kroombit Tops National Park
