= Port Curtis Co-operative Dairy Association Ltd Factory =

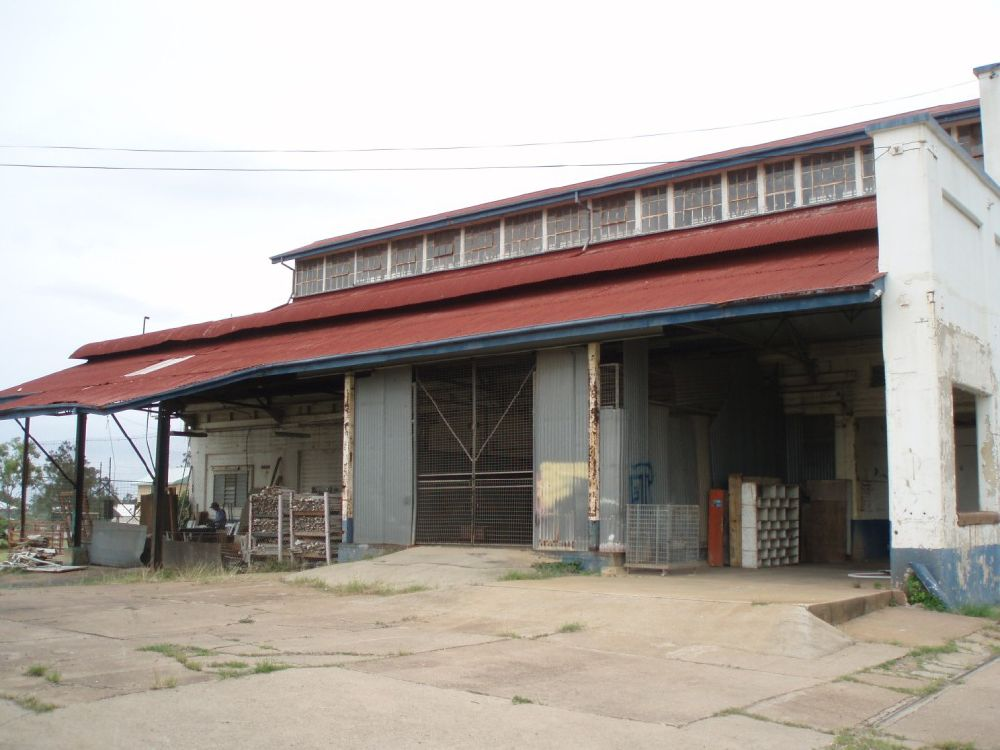
- Former Port Curtis Co-operative Dairy Association Ltd Factory, 2009

- Location within Queensland Location within Australia
- 23.8494°S 151.2662°E
- Location: 6 Short Street, Gladstone, Gladstone Region, Queensland, Australia

History
- Design period: 1919–1930s (interwar period)
- Built: 1929–1949

Queensland Heritage Register
- Official name: Port Curtis Co-operative Dairy Association Ltd Factory (former), PCD Factory, Port Curtis Co-operative Dairy Company Ltd Factory
- Type: state heritage (built)
- Designated: 30 March 2001
- Reference no.: 601334
- Significant period: 1929–1949 (fabric); 1906–1980 (historical)
- Significant components: railway siding, factory building, store/s / storeroom / storehouse, waterhole, cold room/cold store, office/administration building, shed/s

Port Curtis Co-operative Dairy Association Ltd Factory is a heritage-listed former factory at 6 Short Street, Gladstone, Gladstone Region, Queensland, Australia. It was built from 1929 to 1949. It is also known as PCD Factory and Port Curtis Co-operative Dairy Company Ltd Factory. It was added to the Queensland Heritage Register on 30 March 2001.

== History ==
The Port Curtis Dairy Company Ltd (the PCD) was formed at Gladstone in 1904, with its first timber factory buildings erected at Gladstone in 1906. By the 1920s, the PCD was one of the largest co-operative dairy companies in Queensland. The activities of the PCD at Gladstone and in surrounding districts stimulated the expansion of commercial dairying in Central Queensland. Statewide, dairying was an important economic activity for the first half of the 20th century, and a mainstay for farming communities during the economic depression of the early 1930s. Surviving elements of the Gladstone factory site include the 1929–1930 factory building, an early factory office building, several cold stores, a c. 1938 single-storeyed office building with two- storeyed extensions erected 1948–1950, a 1938 re-tinning shed, an ice shed and store room erected during the Second World War, and sections of a 1914 railway siding and 1923 siding extension.

From the late 1880s, the Queensland government promoted the establishment of dairying in Queensland as a commercial, rather than subsistence, activity. The development of dairying as a staple industry was considered a means of relieving selector poverty and debt, and as encouragement to closer settlement of the land. The Meat and Dairy Produce Act 1893 was introduced to offer subsidies to dairy farmers and a tax on cattle, the latter funding the establishment of creameries, cheese and butter factories throughout Queensland. In 1895, Queensland produced its first butter surplus.

The real catalyst for the establishment of commercial dairying proved to be the Agricultural Lands Purchase Act 1894, under which valuable agricultural land long freeholded by pastoralists was repurchased by the government, then offered as selections (mostly on perpetual lease) to agriculturalists. By the late 19th century, pastoralists could no longer afford to maintain huge freeholds, and were keen to relinquish land through repurchase. In the Gladstone district, the 1894 Act led to the opening of the Boyne Valley to selection and closer settlement, and this, combined with the provisions of the Meat and Dairy Produce Act 1893, ultimately led to the establishment of a meatworks (1896) and a butter factory (1906) at Gladstone. The Closer Settlement Act 1906 with its provisions for repurchase and on-selling to agriculturalists as settlement farm leases, led to a dairying boom in the Mount Larcom and Yarwun districts behind Gladstone. The Queensland government further supported agriculturalists with its establishment in 1901 of the Queensland Agricultural Bank, aimed at increasing the flow of credit to selectors, further stimulating the dairying industry.

The Queensland Government also intervened to maintain and enhance standards within the dairying industry. In 1898 the government introduced compulsory grading of butter and cream, prohibiting the mixing of all states of cream (fresh, ripe and stale) in the same vat. The Dairy Produce Acts 1904–05 provided further quality control with the introduction of Government inspection of dairies and factories. In addition, Queensland's Margarine Act 1910 restricting the use of margarine, was aimed at protecting the local dairying industry.

One of the most distinctive characteristics of the early Queensland dairy industry was its organisation along co-operative lines. The co-operative movement, established in Switzerland in the 1880s, gained worldwide popularity at the Second International Dairy Conference held in 1905, but Queensland farmers were experimenting with the concept from the 1890s. In the 1890s and early 1900s, Victorian "dairy immigrants" also brought ideas about co-operatives to Queensland.

In November 1903, a public meeting was held at the Gladstone Town Hall to gauge local interest in forming a co-operative dairy company and erecting a dairy factory at Gladstone. Supported by graziers and selectors alike, a provisional committee was elected, representing Mount Larcombe, Calliope, Clyde Creek, Boyne River, Gladstone, Bororen, and Miriam Vale. The committee canvassed the district for support, soliciting shares and guarantees of milk supplies. As a result, the Port Curtis Co-operative Dairy Company Ltd was registered in Brisbane in September 1904 as a joint stock company, with the registered office situated in Gladstone. The company's objective was to erect a factory at Gladstone for the manufacture and storage of butter and other dairy products. During 1904 articles of association were drawn up, and a founding committee comprising prominent local graziers and businessmen was elected. A site for the dairy factory was selected adjacent to the railway line, a couple of blocks southeast of the main Gladstone railway station, and the scheme was approved by the Meat and Dairy Board. Tenders for the construction of a dairy factory (a timber structure) at Gladstone were called in June 1905 by Bundaberg architect Frederic Herbert Faircloth, with the contract let in August to J Connors. A dispute between the contractor and the dairy company delayed completion for several months, but finally the factory commenced butter production in April 1906. In 1914, Queensland Railways constructed a dead end siding for the PCD, which was extended in 1,923 by 70 feet (586 by 21 m).

The establishment of the butter factory at Gladstone provided local farmers with a steady income and stimulated the town economy. For example, the Queensland National Bank opened a branch at Gladstone in December 1905, and the Commercial Banking Company of Sydney erected substantial new premises in the town in 1910–11 (Kullaroo House).

During the 1910s dairying expanded in the surrounding districts, particularly at Mount Larcom and Bracewell, and the PCD made steady progress. Following the appointment in January 1916 of Joseph W Rigby as Manager and Secretary, the area from which the Company received cream was extended and the Company's growth was greatly accelerated. In the period 1916 to 1923, suppliers increased from 216 to 502 and manufactured butter from 179 to 539 long tons (182 to 548 t). Historian Lorna Macdonald (1988:170) suggests that during the 1920s the combination of Wilson (JL, of Calliope Station) as chairman, Rigby as manager, and RM Hill of Bororen who was elected to the board in 1924 made the PCD one of the largest co-operative organisations in Queensland. JW Rigby remained as manager until November 1931.

By the mid-1920s, the Company was expanding at a substantial rate. Under the provisions of the Primary Producers' Co-operative Associations Act 1923, in order to continue to use the word "co-operative", the Port Curtis Co-operative Dairy Company Ltd was de-registered under the Companies Act 1863 to 1913, and in February 1925 was re-registered under the 1923 Act as the Port Curtis Co-operative Dairy Association Ltd. In the same year the PCD erected its own cold stores at Gladstone, with storage capacity for 150 long tons (150 t) of butter. This obviated the heavy costs of railage to Brisbane, as well as Brisbane cold storage charges, and reduced loss in quality during transit to Brisbane. As a consequence, a higher grade of export butter, and direct overseas shipment of butter from Gladstone, were made possible. The installation of coldstores at the PCD's Gladstone factory had important long-term effects for the Port of Gladstone, where butter formed the staple export from 1926 to 1934, prior to the first chilled beef (distinct from frozen beef) being exported in 1935.

From the mid-1920s the PCD led the way in consolidating the dairying industry in central Queensland, from just south of Bundaberg to Bowen in the north, and inland to Monto, Biloela and Wowan. Consolidation commenced in July 1927 when the recently established Central Queensland Dairy Co-operative Ltd, based at Rockhampton, (and which had already absorbed Mount Larcom & District Co-operative Dairy & Produce Co., established 1921), amalgamated with the Port Curtis Co-operative Dairy Association Ltd. The amalgamation was conditional on the PCD erecting a dairy factory at Rockhampton, which commenced operation in January 1928.

Further negotiations resulted in the absorption of the Bundaberg Co-operative Dairy Association Ltd, whose factory at Bundaberg operated as a branch of the Port Curtis Co-operative Dairy Association Ltd from 1 March 1928. From 1 April 1928 the Dawson Valley Co-operative Dairy Association Ltd's factory at Wowan operated as a branch of the PCD.

Following the opening of the Upper Burnett River to closer settlement in the 1920s, the PCD established a butter factory at Monto in 1929, stimulating a phenomenal expansion of dairying and pig-raising in that district. In the same year the PCD installed a buttermilk drying plant at Gladstone, the powdered buttermilk sold back to dairy farmers for fowl, pig and calf rearing. This proved a popular side-line, and in 1933 the PCD installed a plant at Gladstone for converting buttermilk into a buttermilk curd.

The PCD closed its Gladstone factory on 1 July 1929 for re-building purposes, re-opening early in February 1930 to handle cream only, and was fully operational by September 1930. The 1905–06 building appears to have been demolished at this time, replaced with the present main factory building. The 1929–30 factory contained the PCD's first laboratory.

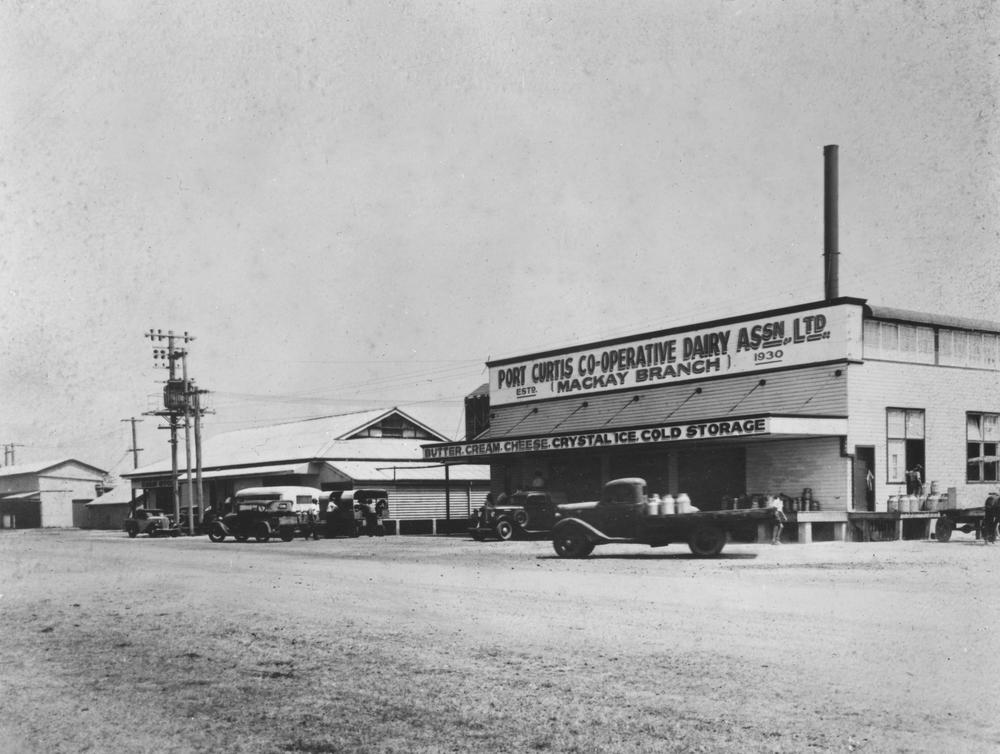
Port Curtis Co-operative Dairy Association Ltd., Mackay, 1937

In addition to the substantial re-building of its Gladstone factory, the PCD opened a new factory in Mackay in March 1930, following the absorption of the Mackay District Co-operative Butter Factory Association Ltd by the PCD in 1929–30.

Dairying proved to be the economic mainstay of many Queensland farming communities, including those of central Queensland, during the depression years of the early 1930s. Pig and calf raising became important adjuncts to the dairying industry, utilising skim milk and later buttermilk from the factories, as stock feed. By the second half of 1934, the increased quantity of butter available for export necessitated the construction of additional cold stores at Gladstone, on land leased from Queensland Railways adjacent to the PCD factory. These commenced operation in January 1935. (This building was demolished c. 1970s.)

The PCD continued to expand its activities in central Queensland in the second half of the 1930s. In 1937 a dairy factory and buttermilk stud stock piggery (carrying capacity 500 pigs) were opened at Biloela in the Callide Valley. Another PCD buttermilk stud stock piggery, with a carrying capacity of 700 pigs, was opened at Monto in February 1938. In November 1938 the PCD installed a plant at the Gladstone factory for the re-tinning of cream cans, which proved popular with farmers.

PCD butter production peaked in 1938–1939 with 9,302 long tons (9,451 t). About 1938 a single-storeyed administrative building was erected south of the main factory building, and in May 1939 a contract was let to J Hutchinson for additional cold stores, capable of storing 40,000 boxes of butter, at the PCD's Gladstone factory. These were operational by October 1940, giving the factory a holding capacity of 65,000 boxes of butter.

The outbreak of the Second World War in September 1939 had a substantial impact on the operations of the PCD. Cheese factories were established at Bracewell (in operation May 1942 to 31 December 1954) and Theodore (in operation from July 1942 to 31 January 1951), to meet requests from the British Government for extra cheese supplies. The processing of pasteurised milk at PCD factories was initiated with the arrival of United States troops at Rockhampton in 1942 as the American military authorities did not approve the use of raw milk. At the Gladstone factory a number of new structures were erected, including an ice shed and store to the east of the PCD siding, both of which remain in situ.

During the war all surplus butter was bought by the Commonwealth Government, but the war-time shortage of refrigerated ships necessitated the construction of emergency cold stores throughout Australia, to store accumulated butter supplies. Gladstone was chosen by the Australian Dairy Produce Control Board as a centre for an emergency cold store for butter and meat, and in 1941–42 a timber cold store was erected there for this purpose In 1946 the PCD purchased the Emergency Stores for a fraction of its original cost, and leased it to Swifts Meatworks for storing meat.

Central Queensland dairy production peaked in the decade 1940–1950, with the PCD providing 28% of all butter exported from Queensland and 10% of the total Australian butter exports. During this period the PCD achieved its greatest diversification with production of butter, cheese, pasteurised milk and ice-cream (after the purchase of Pauls Ice Cream and Milk Ltd factory in Rockhampton in 1945). Facilities for ice cream holding and distribution were established by the PCD at Bundaberg, Gladstone, Mackay and Monto in 1946–47, and in 1948 a complete ice cream manufacturing plant was erected at Mackay for the PCD. In the immediate post-war years the PCD obtained the franchise for pasteurised milk in Rockhampton and established co-operative stores at Gladstone (on PCD land adjacent to the dairy factory, 1949), Biloela, Wowan and Monto, in converted surplus Army Storage Sheds acquired from Eidsvold and Stanwell. In this period the PCD also acquired a half interest in Central Queensland Co-operative Stock Feeds.

In 1947 an attempt to shift PCD headquarters to Rockhampton was defeated and in January 1948 a tender of £11,886 from John Young and Sons was accepted for the construction of a new PCD Head Office at the Gladstone factory (an extension of the c. 1938 administration building). In December 1949 it was decided to add a second storey to the new office building, at a cost of about £1,600.

From the 1950s dairying in the Gladstone hinterland declined in favour of beef cattle and tropical fruit, and the PCD, following a national trend, turned to bulk milk rather than butter production, establishing milk pasteurising facilities and a bottling plant at its Gladstone factory in 1955–57. The factory building was refurbished to accommodate milk processing to meet codes of practice and included the introduction of a lower ceiling in the milk processing room and the re-finishing of the floor. Milk from the dairies was transported to the site by road and by rail. It was received at the northern end of the factory, whereupon the cans were weighed, milk was checked for freshness, sample cups were taken from each supplier and daily cream dockets were issued. The cans were placed upon a conveyor which tipped the milk into troughs and milk was strained into vats. The cans went to the can washer where they were cold rinsed, caustic washed, hot washed and steamed dried before being returned to the supplier for removal. The milk was centrifugally tested and pasteurised in the with the salt hole and pump house on the site providing the water for the vacuum before being bottled and then transported by conveyor to the stores.

The PCD's Gladstone factory continued its milk pasteurising and bottling operation until it closed c. 1980. For some years afterwards, the Gladstone Maritime Museum was housed in the former company administration building, and a number of small businesses leased space in the former factory buildings. In October 1994 the Port Curtis Dairy Co-operative Association Ltd was absorbed by Paul's Ltd (Queensland United Food Industries), which sold the former Gladstone PCD factory in the late 1990s.

In 2015, the former administration building is leased to Anglicare as their Gladstone Family Resource Centre, while the former factory remains vacant. The site was advertised for freehold sale in November 2015, noting that "plans [had] been drawn to refurbish the existing [factory] building and create five separate tenancies".

== Description ==
The Port Curtis Co-Operative Dairy Factory is a complex of buildings located on a 1.92-hectare (4.7-acre) site that rises from the reclaimed flats of Barney Point up a rise to the eastern side of a cutting along the north-south railway line. The site is bounded to the north and east by a large vacant freehold property owned by Queensland Rail, to the south by Young Street and to the west by railway reserve.

The administration building is situated on the highest point of the site in the south-western corner adjacent to the railway bridge over Young Street. The building is divided into two sections. Adjacent to Young Street the single storey rendered masonry section has articulated engaged piers to its southern elevation, a hipped corrugated iron roof surmounted by two small ventilators, quad guttering, later sliding aluminium windows and boarded soffits in line with the rafters. The two storey rendered masonry section attached along its northern also has a hipped corrugated iron roof and quad guttering but has a flat soffit with timber cover strips and no evidence of articulated piers. It has a rendered masonry string course below the window line. The windows comprise groups of six top hung sashes to the western elevation with later aluminium sliding windows generally throughout the remainder of the building.

The butter stores are located between the Administration building and the butter factory to the north. The butter stores are in four parts. There is a two-storey wing along the western end which has a despatch/loading area at the excavated platform level of the factory and staff amenities on the upper level which aligns with the ground floor level of the Administration Building. This section has a gabled corrugated fibrous cement roof and metal framed double hung windows - larger openings have fixed sidelights. The stores are divided into three bays and are located at right angles to and are attached to the eastern wall of the dispatch wing. Two of the bays (to the south) have external wall of concrete frame and infill construction with corrugated fibrous cement gable roofs surmounted by pairs of large ventilators. The gable ends are lined with flat fibrous cement sheeting with timber cover battens and house louvred vents below which a suspended fibrous cement awning provides protection to several large doors which open onto a platform. The third bay to the north is of a similar form but of different construction. It has a corrugated iron roof and appears to have corrugated iron clad walls and steel framed windows.

The butter factory originally housed the laboratory, boiler house, engine room, vacuators and butter processing areas following which it accommodated the milk bottling plant. The factory is a large two-storey volume building of concrete frame and infill external wall construction supporting a steel framed roof. The building is divided into two bays with corrugated iron gabled roofs. Gabled roof clerestoreys running the length of each bay provide natural light and ventilation together with steel framed multipaned centrally pivoting windows in the eastern end elevation. A third ventilated gabled roof supported on a steel frame is attached along the northern end of the building providing protection for a receiving/loading area. The tops of the clerestoreys are visible from the west above the large concrete framed facade which faces the city and railway line and prominently displays the Port Curtis Co-Operative Dairy name and insignia. The infill panels are omitted at ground level on western facade providing access to a platform adjacent to which are remains of part of the railway siding.

The railway siding comprised two tracks which entered the site near the south-eastern end across Young Street. These tracks converged at the northern end of the butter stores curving around the northern end of the factory and exiting to the main railway line at the north western end of the site. A spur off this siding returned around the factory along its western face. Sections of the track survive near the Young Street boundary, at the rear of the butter stores and to the west of the factory.

The factory office, relocated to the north of the factory from its original location to the west of the siding, is a timber framed building, lowset on stumps with timber top hung sash windows and a flat fibrous cement wall cladding with timber cover strips. It has a corrugated iron gambrel roof with eaves extended over the south-west elevation.

The ice room and store are located to the north east of the factory. The ice room is a two-storey, timber framed volume with hipped corrugated iron roof. It has timber battens surrounding the base above which the walls are lined with vertical corrugated iron sheeting. Adjacent to the ice room is a store room which is a single storey volume with a hipped corrugated fibrous cement roof and wall clad in vertical corrugated fibrous cement sheeting.

The tin shed is located toward the north eastern end of the site and is a single storey building clad in vertical corrugated fibrous cement sheeting. It has a gambrel roof with a ventilated ridge and later metal doors and gablet detailing to its eastern end.

A water hole survives in the north eastern portion of the site and may be the salt hole from which water was drawn to form a vacuum in the pasteurisation process at the factory.

== Heritage listing ==
The former Port Curtis Co-operative Dairy Association Ltd Factory was listed on the Queensland Heritage Register on 30 March 2001 having satisfied the following criteria.

The place is important in demonstrating the evolution or pattern of Queensland's history.

The Former Port Curtis Co-operative Dairy Association Ltd Factory, Gladstone, is important in illustrating the pattern and evolution of Queensland's history, being the first in a chain of Port Curtis Co-operative Dairy Association Ltd (PCD) factories established in Central Queensland, and PCD headquarters until c. 1980.

The place is important in demonstrating the principal characteristics of a particular class of cultural places.

The place retains a number of elements integral to the function of the place as a butter (and later milk pasteurising and bottling) factory, including the 1929–30 factory building, an early factory office building, several cold stores, a c. 1938 single-storeyed company administration building with two-storeyed extensions erected 1948–1950, a 1938 re-tinning shed, an ice shed and a store erected during the Second World War, and sections of the 1914/1923 railway siding. These elements are important in illustrating the principal characteristics of an early to mid 20th century dairy factory with company headquarters and important links to a principal railway network and to overseas port facilities.

The place has a strong or special association with a particular community or cultural group for social, cultural or spiritual reasons.

The former Port Curtis Co-operative Dairy Association Ltd Factory, Gladstone was a major employer for nearly 8 decades, through much of the 20th century, and retains strong social significance for the people of Gladstone and district.

The place has a special association with the life or work of a particular person, group or organisation of importance in Queensland's history.

The place is significant for its association with the work of the PCD in encouraging the expansion of dairying as a commercial activity in Central Queensland through the first half of the 20th century. The PCD was one of the largest dairying co-operatives in Queensland, was highly successful in stimulating the expansion of dairying in Central Queensland, and was a major exporter of Australian butter – most of this via the Gladstone factory.
