= Hayley Marsten =

Australian singer and songwriter

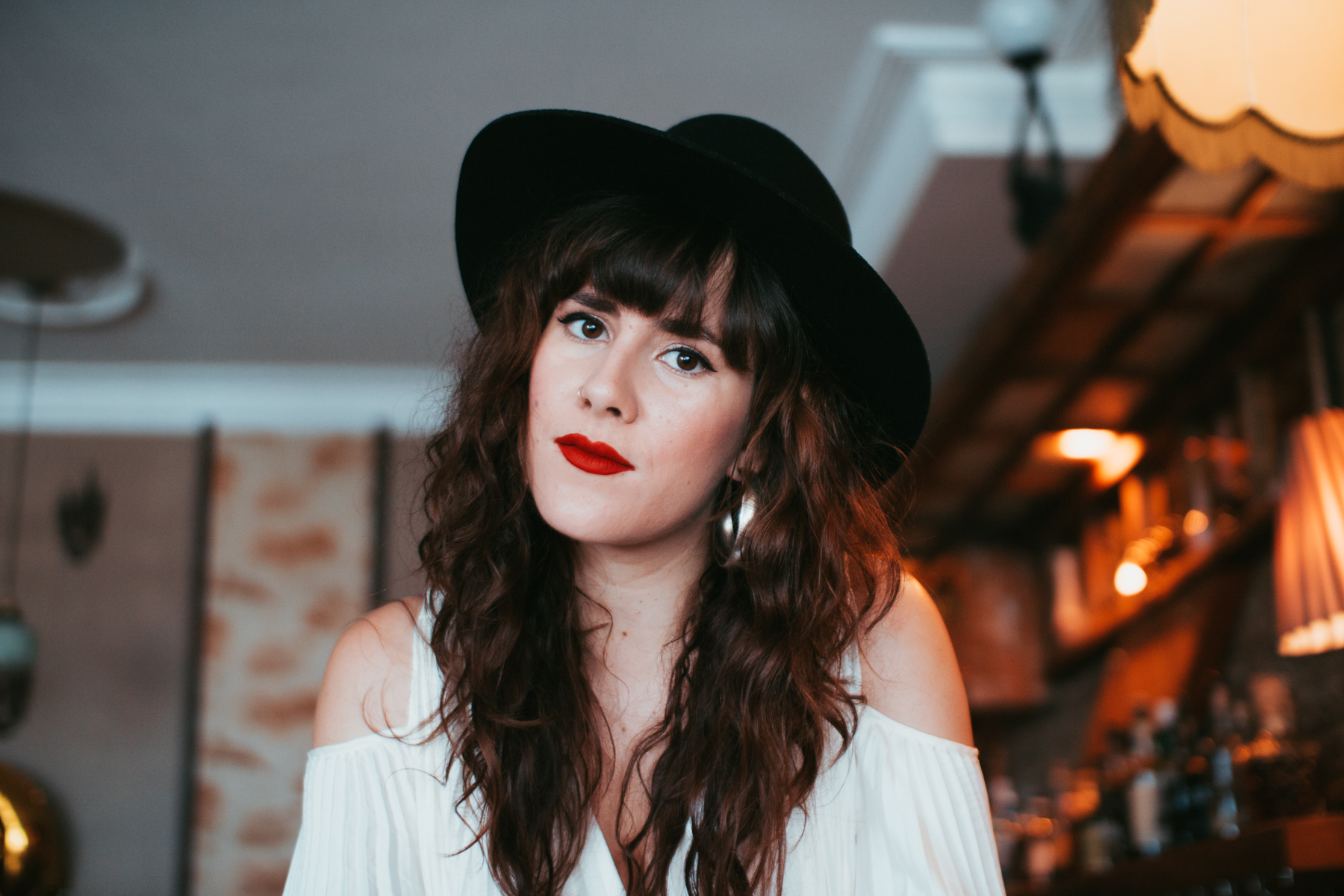

Background information
- Born: Hayley Marsten; Australia
- Genres: Country
- Occupations: Singer; songwriter
- Instruments: Vocals, guitar
- Years active: 2015–present
- Website: www.hayleymarsten.com

Hayley Marsten is an Australian country music singer-songwriter, originally from Gladstone, Queensland, Australia. She is a touring, recording, multi-award nominated artist. Her debut studio album Spectacular Heartbreak was released in August 2019. In 2023, Hayley signed to Cheatin' Hearts Records and released her sophomore album, 'Girlhood' through the label.

== Career ==
=== Early life ===
Hayley grew up in Gladstone, Queensland and later moved to the state's capital, Brisbane to study at Queensland University of Technology and pursue her music career.

=== 2015–2018: Even and Lonestar EP ===
In 2015, Marsten released her debut extended play, titled Even. Two of the singles reached the top 40 of the Country Tracks Chart. Late in 2015, Marsten was announced as one of the 10 finalists for the 2016 Toyota Star Maker competition.

In May 2017, Marsten released "Until You", the lead single from her second EP, Lonestar. Lonestar was produced by ARIA Award and Golden Guitar winning producer, Matt Fell. The EP debuted at No. 8 on the ARIA Country Albums Chart. The EP spawned three more singles, 'Second Fiddle', 'Money Can't Buy Class' and 'Coming Home'. With 'Coming Home' eventually reaching #1 on the Kix Country Charts.

=== 2019–2022: Spectacular Heartbreak ===
In 2019 Marsten crowdfunded her debut album through Pozible and raised over $17,000. Spectacular Heartbreak was released on 30 August 2019. At the 2020 Country Music Awards of Australia, the album was nominated for 'Alt Country Album of the Year'. It was later nominated for 'Country Work of the Year' at the 2020 Queensland Music Awards. In 2021, she released a digital EP, 'Spectacular' which featured four songs from the album, 'Spectacular Heartbreak', reimagined on piano. In 2022, 'Drowning Myself' the lead single from her second album, Girlhood was nominated for a Queensland Music Award. That same month Hayley crowd funded $20,000 for Girlhood while about to begin recording it. In October and November 2022 she appeared at the Deni Ute Muster and Groundwater Country Music Festival.

=== 2023: Girlhood ===
In early 2023 Hayley signed with Cheatin' Hearts Records and played for the first time at CMC Rocks. Marsten's second studio album Girlhood was released on 16 June 2023 and reached #4 on the ARIA Country Charts on release. In 2024, Hayley was nominated for a Queensland Music Award in Country for 'Getting Better' from Girlhood.

== Discography ==
=== Albums ===
List of studio albums with selected details
Title	Album details
Spectacular Heartbreak	Release date: 30 August 2019; Label: Hayley Marsten; Formats: Digital download, streaming, CD
Girlhood	Release date: 16 June 2023; Label: Cheatin' Hearts; Formats: digital download, streaming, CD, Vinyl

=== Extended plays ===
List of Extended plays with selected details
Title	Album details
Even	Release date: 2015; Label: Hayley Marsten; Formats: CD
Lonestar	Release date: 9 June 2017; Label: Hayley Marsten; Formats: Digital download, streaming, CD
Spectacular	Release date: 15 June 2021; Label: Hayley Marsten; Formats: Digital download, streaming

== Awards and nominations ==
=== Country Music Awards of Australia ===
The Country Music Awards of Australia is an annual awards night held in January during the Tamworth Country Music Festival. Celebrating recording excellence in the Australian country music industry. They commenced in 1973.

Year	Nominee / work	Award	Result	Ref.
2020	Spectacular Heartbreak	Alt-Country Album of the Year	Nominated	

==== Queensland Music Awards ====
The Queensland Music Awards (known as Q Song Awards until 2010) are annual awards celebrating Queensland, Australia's brightest emerging artists and established legends. They commenced in 2006.

Year	Nominee / work	Award	Result	Ref.
2020	Wendy	Country Work of the Year	Nominated	
2022	Drowning Myself	Country Work of the Year	Nominated	
2024	Getting Better	Country Work of the Year	Nominated	
