= Kullaroo House =

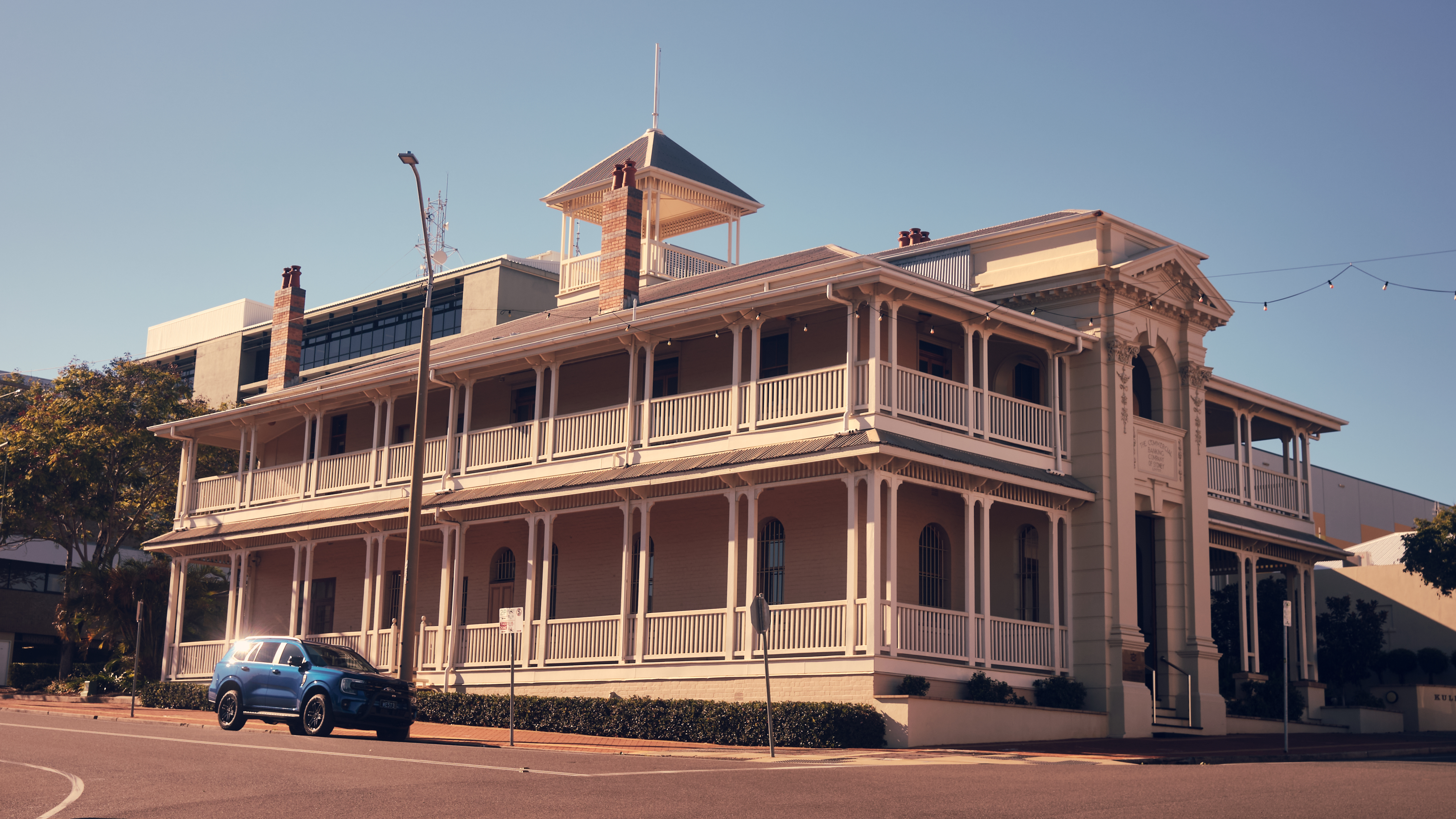
- Kullaroo House, 2025

- Location within Queensland Location within Australia
- 23.8403°S 151.2542°E
- Location: 40 Goondoon Street, Gladstone, Gladstone Region, Queensland, Australia

History
- Design period: 1900–1914 (early 20th century)
- Built: 1910–1911

Site notes
- Architect: James Percy Owen Cowlishaw
- Architectural style: Classicism

Queensland Heritage Register
- Official name: Kullaroo House, Commercial Banking Company of Sydney Ltd (Gladstone Branch)
- Type: state heritage (built)
- Designated: 5 March 1999
- Reference no.: 601330
- Significant period: 1910s (fabric); 1911–1958 (historical bank use)
- Significant components: banking chamber, furniture/fittings, fireplace, strong room
- Builders: A A Carrick

Kullaroo House is a heritage-listed former bank building at 40 Goondoon Street, Gladstone, Gladstone Region, Queensland, Australia. It was designed by James Percy Owen Cowlishaw and built from 1910 to 1911 by A A Carrick. It is also known as Commercial Banking Company of Sydney Ltd (Gladstone Branch). It was added to the Queensland Heritage Register on 5 March 1999.

== History ==
Kullaroo House was constructed in 1910–11 for the Commercial Banking Company of Sydney (CBC), which moved into the building in June 1911. It was designed by Brisbane architect James Percy Owen Cowlishaw, who designed many of the Commercial Banking Company of Sydney's Queensland premises.

The Commercial Banking Company of Sydney Ltd had been formed in New South Wales by local interests in 1834, and had established its first Queensland branch at Maryborough by 1860. A branch was opened in Gladstone on 9 June 1897, long after the Australian Joint Stock Bank and the Queensland Government Savings Bank had opened offices there in the mid-1860s, but predating the Queensland National Bank (1905) and the Commonwealth Bank of Australia (1912). The move by the CBC into Gladstone in 1897 appears to have been associated with the 1896 opening of the Gladstone meatworks and extension of the northern railway from Brisbane to Gladstone.

By the turn of the century the ubiquitous cattle tick was decimating the local grazing industry, affecting meatworks production and cattle shipments. This, coupled with the great drought of 1900–02 and the 1903 opening of the Rockhampton extension of the northern railway (which immediately deprived Gladstone of substantial port trade and passenger shipping), caused a crisis in business confidence in the town. The development of a local dairying industry, however, and the 1905 opening of a butter factory at Gladstone, did much to revive the town's fortunes, and the future of town and district appeared secure in 1909 when new Gladstone premises were being planned for the Commercial Banking Company of Sydney.

Initially, the Bank had leased shop premises at 22 Goondoon Street, then in 1901 took a 10-year lease on premises at 30–32 Goondoon Street. As the expiration of the lease approached, the Bank made the decision to invest in new, purpose-built banking premises. The site at the southeast corner of Goondoon and Yarroon Streets, in the heart of Gladstone, was purchased in February 1909 for £600. Brisbane architect James Percy Owen Cowlishaw, son of early Brisbane architect James Cowlishaw, was commissioned to design the building, and the tender was let in May 1910 to AA Carrick of Brisbane, with a tender price of £4,650. In July 1910, the Bank appointed James Beattie as Clerk of Works to supervise construction.

JPO Cowlishaw's design was for a two-storeyed building, with banking chamber on the ground floor and manager's residence on the upper floor. The Gladstone manager, Mr WB Thomas, was keen to see a building of some substance erected: "The figures of the Branch and the good prospects of both town and district, entitle a fairly good building. With the splendid harbour here there is every possibility that in time the town will develop into one of some importance". There was no local brickworks at Gladstone, and the manager recommended concrete rather than timber construction. However, when he saw the plans prepared by Cowlishaw for a two-storeyed building of face brickwork, he was delighted: "The building will be by far the best in town, and a good advertisement for the Bank".

Despite the contractor having some difficulty in managing the project satisfactorily, Beattie worked to ensured that the contract was completed, and the building was handed over to the bank on 13 May 1911. Interior fittings were fixed, and the bank opened for business in its new premises in June 1911. In the ensuing months a concrete retaining wall was erected at the rear of the site and along part of Yarroon Street, and picket fences erected on parts of both street frontages.

The two-storeyed brick premises at the corner of Goondoon and Yarroon Streets served the Commercial Banking Company of Sydney for nearly 50 years. In the mid-1950s the bank commissioned new premises in Goondoon Street (designed by JPO Cowlishaw's son, architect George Owen Cowlishaw of Ure, McNaught & Cowlishaw, Brisbane), which opened on 26 May 1958. In September that year, the Bank accepted an offer of £4,500 from Gladstone businessman Mr MA Busteed, to purchase the former banking premises (land and building). From the early 1960s at least, the building was occupied as a boarding house, known as Kullaroo House. The name Kullaroo is believed to be an Aboriginal word meaning road that leads to water, and from the upper verandahs of Kullaroo House fine views of Gladstone harbour can be obtained.

In the 1970s, new owners Goodwin, McKenzie, Forbes and Partners, lawyers, refurbished the building as law offices, retaining much of the original detailing. In the late 1980s Kullaroo House was used as a restaurant and in 1993 was acquired by the Gladstone Port Authority, which refurbished the building for office expansion. It is understood that at this time, most of the internal first floor partitions were removed. In 1996–97 further refurbishments were carried out and a large extension, imitating the original detailing, was constructed. Currently, both floors of the 1911 building contain office accommodation.

== Description ==
Kullaroo House, the former Commercial Banking Company of Sydney Building, is a substantial two-storeyed brick building prominently situated in Goondoon Street, overlooking Gladstone Harbour.

The building is rectangular in plan with a large extension, which is connected to the rear of the eastern corner of the building. The building has a double height verandah on three sides and a projecting double height entry porch The porch is detailed with classical elements. The building has a hipped corrugated iron roof with a smaller hipped section over the porch. Three tall chimney stacks, of alternating bands of light and dark brickwork project through the roof.

The original layout of the bank contained the banking chamber and associated offices on the ground floor level, with the manager's residence above. When constructed, Kullaroo House was face brickwork, but the building has subsequently been painted and this diminishes the architectural articulation of the design.

Kullaroo House is entered via a flight of stairs leading to the entrance porch. The porch is plastered brickwork which distinguishes it from the rest of the building. The plasterwork is rusticated, on either side of the entrance double height pilasters support a triangular pediment. The pilasters have composite capitals and decorative swags. On the upper level of the porch the arched openings have been enclosed and the space is used as an air conditioning plant room. The two storey verandah has a small projecting roof at first floor level and is detailed in timber with paired columns, slatted balustrade and valance. On the southern section of the ground level verandah, the balustrade has been removed and the columns have been sliced off above ground floor level and are supported by concrete plinths.

At ground floor level all the major rooms associated with the original design of the building as a bank remain intact. The entrance porch opens onto the main banking chamber, which has all its original cedar door and window joinery, pressed metal ceiling and black marble fireplace. Part of the original cedar counter remains and has been modified for modern office use. The original safe is at the rear of the chamber and is intact with its patent fireproof door and domed concrete ceiling. Two large rooms open to the east off the main chamber. These rooms have cedar joinery, pressed metal ceilings and white marble fireplace surrounds that are intact with register grates and decorative tiles.

A small room at the rear of the banking chamber has an external door to the verandah and leads to the stair hall which has an intact cedar staircase and pressed metal ceiling. An arched opening at the end of the stair hall leads to the section of the building constructed in 1996–1997. Behind the stair hall is a large room that has been created from two smaller rooms; it has a dropped ceiling and a new door to the verandah.

The staircase leads to the second level. On this level all the original ceilings have been removed and replaced with a dropped ceiling, with fluorescent lighting and air conditioning grilles. Most of the internal walls have been removed to create a large open office space. As this level was the residence of the bank manager, most of the rooms had french doors opening onto the verandah. The french doors remain, but benches and desks have been built across the doors so that they no longer operate as doors.

The 1997 extension is set back from Goondoon Street; externally it mimics the classical detailing of the original building. The junction of the original building and the extension is marked on the roof line by a timber belvedere with a corrugated iron roof. The extension does not form part of the heritage listing.

== Heritage listing ==
Kullaroo House was listed on the Queensland Heritage Register on 5 March 1999 having satisfied the following criteria.

The place is important in demonstrating the evolution or pattern of Queensland's history.

Kullaroo House, erected in 1910–1911 as new premises for the Commercial Banking Company of Sydney's Gladstone branch, is important in illustrating the pattern of Queensland's history, demonstrating the renewal of business confidence in Gladstone and district in the early years of the 20th century. It was one of the CBC's more substantial regional offices, and illustrates how Gladstone was perceived at the time as potentially an important regional centre.

The place is important in demonstrating the principal characteristics of a particular class of cultural places.

Despite a number of late 20th century refurbishments, the building still illustrates the principal characteristics of a substantial, early 20th century, two-storeyed brick banking premises with classical detailing, designed to impress.

The place is important because of its aesthetic significance.

The building is aesthetically pleasing, is located on a prominent site in the principal street of Gladstone, and makes a strong contribution to the Gladstone townscape.

The place has a strong or special association with a particular community or cultural group for social, cultural or spiritual reasons.

The place is considered locally as one of Gladstone's finest buildings, and is of landmark status.

The place has a special association with the life or work of a particular person, group or organisation of importance in Queensland's history.

It is important as a fine example of the work of Queensland architect JPO Cowlishaw, and in illustrating the work of the Commercial Banking Company of Sydney in central Queensland in the first half of the 20th century.
