= Fig Tree, Gladstone =

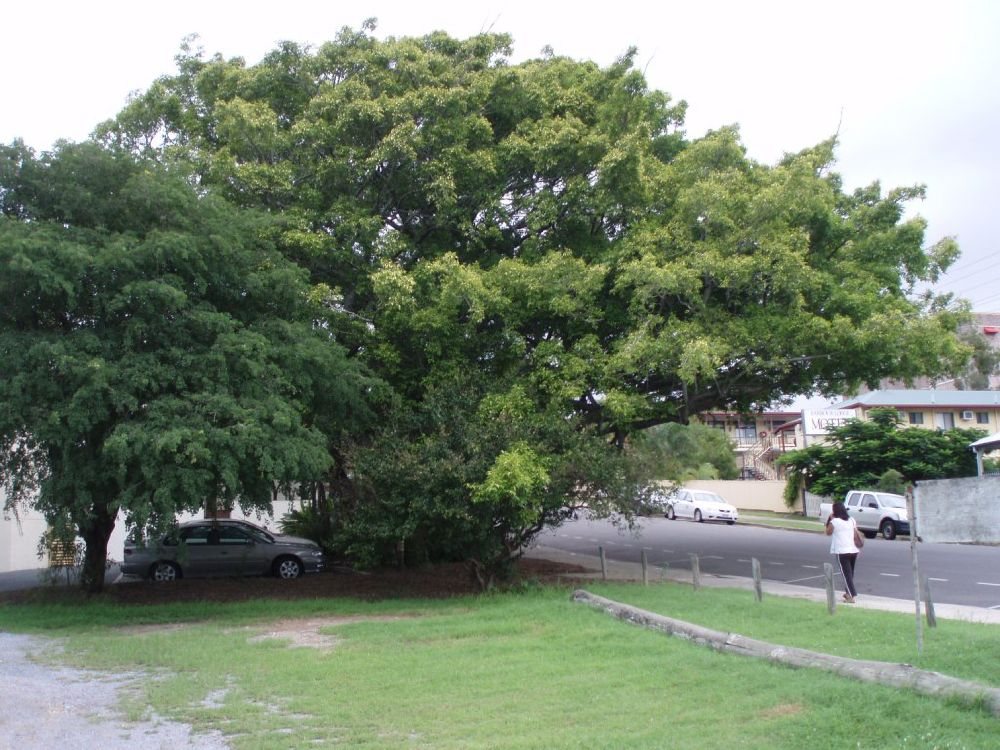
- Fig Tree, 2009

- Location within Queensland Location within Australia
- 23.8413°S 151.2566°E
- Location: Roseberry Street, Gladstone Central, Gladstone, Gladstone Region, Queensland, Australia

History
- Design period: 1900–1914 (early 20th century)
- Built: c. 1903

Queensland Heritage Register
- Official name: Fig Tree, Heritage Tree
- Type: state heritage (landscape)
- Designated: 3 December 2003
- Reference no.: 602385
- Significant period: c. 1903 (historical)
- Significant components: plaque

Fig Tree is a heritage-listed tree at Roseberry Street, Gladstone Central, Gladstone, Gladstone Region, Queensland, Australia. It was planted c. 1903. It is also known as Heritage Tree. It was added to the Queensland Heritage Register on 3 December 2003.

== History ==
The Fig Tree, located on the corner of Roseberry and Auckland Streets, Gladstone, is a mature Ficus benjamina planted c. 1903 by local businessman James Friend in what was at the time, the horse paddock in the grounds of his Roseberry Street home, Elonera House.

Gladstone township was established in April 1854. The Friend family, Henry and Mary Ann Friend and their two small sons Harry (Henry junior) aged 3 and James aged 1, were amongst its earliest settlers, arriving in 1855. Henry Friend senior was employed on the construction of Gladstone's first water supply. When this work was completed he established a general store in Toolooa Street, at the Barney Point end of town. As settlement gradually focussed further north, on Auckland Creek and the shipping trade, Friend established a shipping and forwarding agency, with his own wharf and warehouse, on the banks of the creek. He was a foundation alderman on Gladstone's first municipal council in 1863, and served as Mayor in 1866 and again in 1869–70.

In 1875 his sons Henry and James took over the family general merchandising business as H & J Friend, with considerable success. In 1900 they moved from Auckland Creek to Goondoon Street, and in 1939 the business became a limited liability company known as Friends Pty Ltd. In 1954 the company celebrated 97 years of service to Gladstone during the centenary of the establishment of Gladstone in 1854.

The Friend family were also involved in the pastoral industry. Henry Friend senior acquired an interest in Diamantina Station and the export of cattle to Asia; and by 1900 Henry junior and James Friend were the proprietors of Springwood Station in the Springsure district. By 1920 their interest in Springwood Station had passed to James Friend's sons, Herbert and Cyril. The Friends were prominent members of the Gladstone community. Both Henry and James were Justices of the Peace, and Mrs James Friend was secretary of the Gladstone Benevolent Asylum.

James Friend married Ellen Matilda Prizeman in 1879. They raised a family of 3 sons and 3 daughters, born between 1880 and 1891. In June 1900 title to a one-acre block of land bounded by Roseberry and Auckland Streets and Oaka Lane, was transferred to Ellen Matilda Friend, wife of James Friend of Gladstone, merchant. On this land James and Ellen erected a substantial two-storeyed residence, Elonera House, facing Roseberry Street near the corner of Oaka Lane. It was one of Gladstone's finest houses, complemented with a large garden and stables, and a horse paddock at the corner of Roseberry and Auckland streets. It was in this paddock that the fig tree was planted on the Roseberry Street frontage, reputedly by James Friend c. 1903.

In February 1928 title to the property passed to Robert Horner Fletcher, medical practitioner, of Gladstone, who subdivided it into four allotments. Title to the 28.85 perches (730 m^{2}) subdivision at the corner of Roseberry and Auckland Streets, containing the fig tree, was transferred to prominent Gladstone citizen and historian William Robert Golding junior in May 1930. Elonera House was converted into a private hospital called Balcomba in 1931, and into four flats during the Second World War, in response to the housing shortage. It remained flats until 1980 and was demolished soon after.

Title to the corner allotment with the fig tree passed to a series of investors in 1980–1981, until in 1982 it was acquired, along with the adjacent subdivisions, by the Queensland Government. Government offices were constructed on the site of Elonera House, at the corner of Roseberry and Oaka Lane. The fig tree remains near the corner of Roseberry and Auckland Streets, adjacent to an open area which is used as a car park. In 1983 the local community was successful in having the tree entered in the National Trust of Queensland's Register of Significant Trees, and in the early 1990s the fig tree was the focus of public attention when the community rallied to save the tree, which appeared to be in decline. In 1993 the Gladstone Port Authority funded the erection of a sign recording the history of the tree. The tree has been identified in the 1999 Gladstone City Cultural Heritage Places Study as a place of cultural heritage significance.

== Description ==
The Roseberry Street Fig Tree is a mature Ficus benjamina (weeping fig) situated in the grounds of the Government Offices in Roseberry Street, Gladstone. It has a height of 12 metres (39 ft) and a canopy spread of approximately 37 metres (121 ft) with a trunk circumference of 660 centimetres (260 in). The tree overhangs the road providing shade for cars parked along the street. Around the base of the tree is a small garden planted with shade loving shrubs which add to the aesthetic value of the place. A modern wooden seat has been placed underneath the deep shade of the tree and near this is located a plaque outlining the history of the tree and its connection to former prominent Gladstone citizens, James Friend and William Robert Golding. The tree dominates the streetscape with its obvious beauty, age and size and it has become a place of rest and conversation for those working in the immediate vicinity.

== Heritage listing ==
The fig tree was listed on the Queensland Heritage Register on 3 December 2003 having satisfied the following criteria.

The place is important in demonstrating the evolution or pattern of Queensland's history.

Estimated to be over 100 years old, the fig tree at the State Government Centre, Roseberry Street, Gladstone is a familiar landmark in the town of Gladstone, and is linked historically to James Friend, a prominent member of the Gladstone community, who reputedly planted it in his Roseberry Street garden c. 1903. It is the only surviving remnant of the large garden which surrounded one of Gladstone's finest residences, Elonera House, erected c. 1900 and demolished c. 1980.

The place is important because of its aesthetic significance.

It is the only surviving remnant of the large garden which surrounded one of Gladstone's finest residences, Elonera House, erected c. 1900 and demolished c. 1980.

The place has a strong or special association with a particular community or cultural group for social, cultural or spiritual reasons.

The tree is valued by the present community for its streetscape and aesthetic value and is well-known to local residents and business houses, many of whom have contributed newspaper articles and offered support to conserve the tree when it appeared to be in decline in the early 1990s.
