= Ashton's Circus =

Long-established circus in Australia

Ashton's Circus, also known as Circus Joseph Ashton after 1998, was one of several circus-related operations operated by the Ashton family in Australia. Ashton's Circus was the longest-surviving circus in Australia, predating most others in the English-speaking world.

== History ==
The circus was originally founded in Hobart, Tasmania, in 1847 by Thomas Mollor, and acquired in 1850 by James Henry Ashton, then using his birth name Golden Ashton. The circus originally operated as the Royal Amphitheatre or Royal Circus.

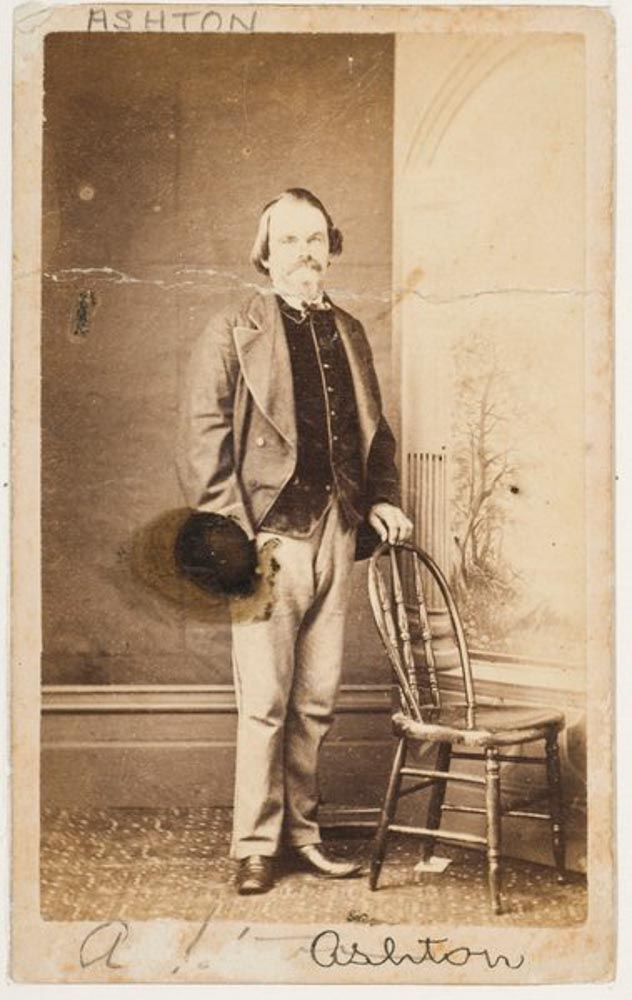
Founder James Henry Ashton.

James Henry Ashton was born in Rochford, Essex, England, in 1820, and by his teen years had been arrested and jailed several times for theft and disorderly conduct. In 1836 he was condemned to 14 years transportation to the penal colony in Australia. He was ultimately placed on the convict ship Frances Charlotte in January 1837, and five months later arrived in Van Diemen's Land (Tasmania). Ashton was granted a ticket of leave in 1844 after serving his sentence in Australia, and in 1848 he was granted a conditional pardon which forbade him from returning to England. Various newspapers, such as the Hobarton Guardian and The Tasmanian, document that Ashton began performing stunts at circuses in October 1848. He then acquired Mollor's circus in 1850 and ultimately renamed it as Ashton's Circus, and he remained involved in the circus's operations until his death in 1889.

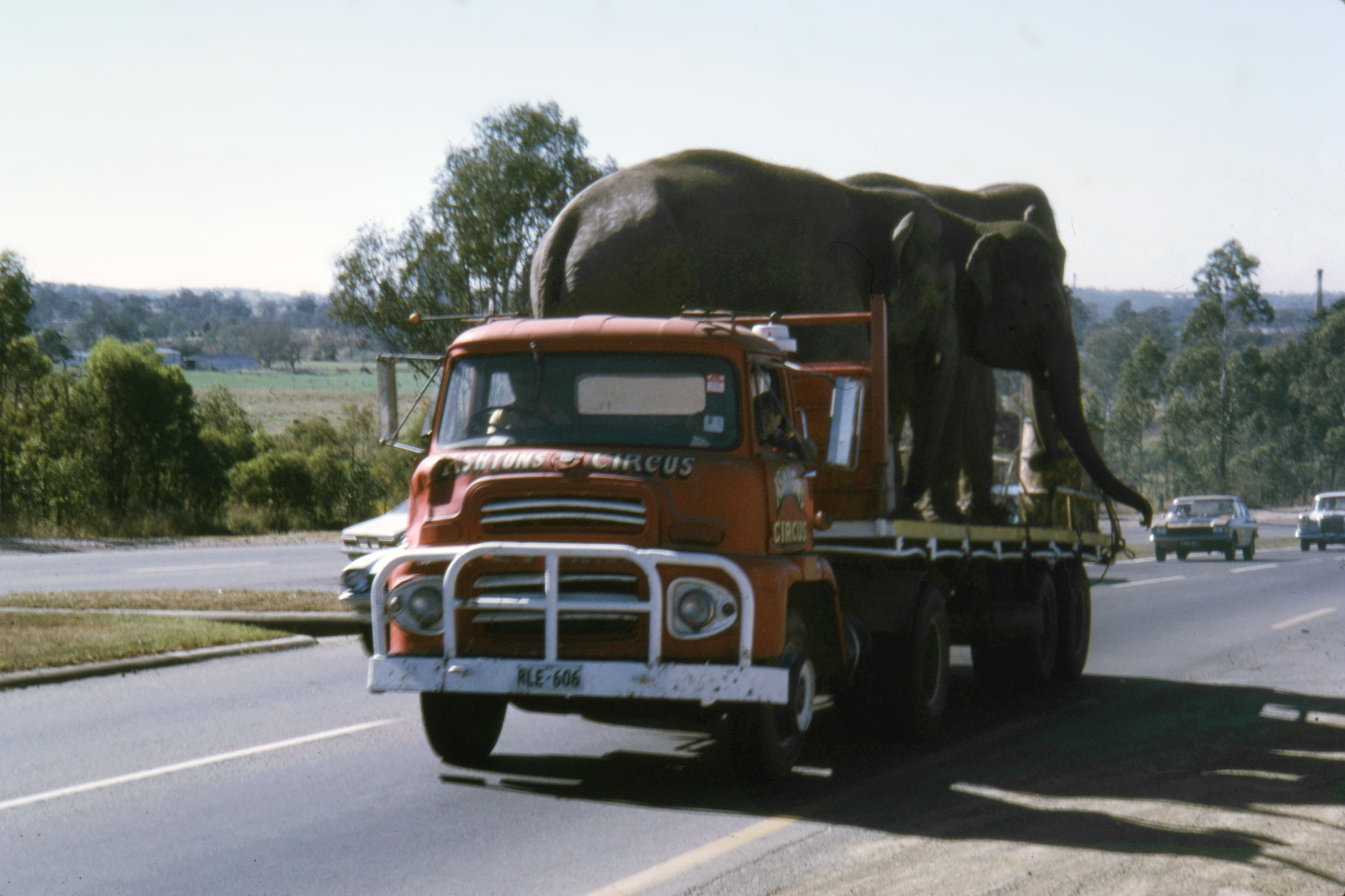
Ashton's Circus transporting three elephants on the Brisbane-Ipswich Road, 1975

Ashton's Circus, at its height, had more than 180 personnel, 80 animals, and thousands of dollars' worth of equipment, and toured internationally in New Zealand and Papua New Guinea. When James Henry Ashton died, his son Fred, then aged 22, inherited the circus. The circus continued to be handed down through the family, with descendant Joseph Ashton renaming it as Circus Joseph Ashton in 1998. The sixth generation of Ashtons continued operating this circus until 2017.

The company employed Tommy Hanlon Jr., after his career in television. Other circuses and entertainment businesses run by members of the Ashton family include Ashton Entertainment, Infamous the Show, Lorraine Ashton's Classic Circus, and Circus Xsavia.

== See also ==
- List of circuses and circus owners
