= James Percy Owen Cowlishaw =

Australian architect

James Percy Owen Cowlishaw (1867–1925) was an architect in Queensland, Australia. He is best known for his Commercial Bank of Australia buildings.
