= Turkey Beach, Queensland =

Turkey Beach
- Town
- Interactive map of Turkey Beach
- Coordinates: 24.0825°S 151.6513°E
- Country: Australia
- State: Queensland
- LGA: Gladstone Region
- Location: 45.7 km (28.4 mi) NNE of Miriam Vale; 50.9 km (31.6 mi) SE of Tannum Sands; 67.9 km (42.2 mi) SE of Gladstone; 169 km (105 mi) SE of Rockhampton; 512 km (318 mi) N of Brisbane

Government
  - State electorate: Burnett
  - Federal division: Flynn

Area
  - Total: 3.0 km^{2} (1.2 sq mi)

Population
  - Total: 148 (2021 census)
  - Density: 49.3/km^{2} (127.8/sq mi)
- Time zone: UTC+10:00 (AEST)
- Postcode: 4678
Localities around Turkey Beach
Rodds Bay	Coral Sea	Eurimbula
Rodds Bay	Turkey Beach	Eurimbula
Rodds Bay	Rodds Bay	Rodds Bay

Turkey Beach is a coastal town and locality in the Gladstone Region, Queensland, Australia. In the 2021 census, the locality of Turkey Beach had a population of 148 people.

== Geography ==
Turkey Beach is a coastal town that sits on a peninsula jutting into Rodds Bay (24.071°S 151.649°E).

Turkey Beach Road connects the town to the Bruce Highway at Foreshores.

== History ==
The town was gazetted on 1 November 1968. The name Turkey relates directly back to the bustard or bush turkey shot by Captain Cook's crew back in 1770 when they discovered the area aboard HMS Endeavour. Nearby Turkey Station existed since at latest 1875.

Turkey Beach was within the Shire of Miriam Vale until the shire was amalgamated into the Gladstone Region in 2008.

Turkey Beach Cenotaph was officially unveiled in April 2012 and used later that month for its first Anzac Day memorial services. Vietnam War veteran Ron Jenson worked toward establishing the cenotaph for 12 years.

== Demographics ==
In the 2006 census, the locality of Turkey Beach had a population of 133 people.

In the 2016 census, the locality of Turkey Beach had a population of 183 people.

In the 2021 census, the locality of Turkey Beach had a population of 148 people.

== Education ==
There are no schools in Turkey Beach. The nearest government primary school is Bororen State School in Bororen to the south-west. The nearest government secondary schools are Miriam Vale State School (to Year 10) in Miriam Vale to the south-west and Tannum Sands State High School (to Year 12) in Tannum Sands to the north-west.

== Amenities ==
There is a boat ramp and floating walkway at Hancock Street into Rodds Harbour (24.0748°S 151.6523°E). It is managed by the Gladstone Regional Council. There is a swimming enclosure to the north of the boat ramp.

== Attractions ==
Turkey Beach Cenotaph is a war memorial on the Esplanade at the northern tip of the peninsula (24.07432°S 151.65096°E).
