= St Luke's Anglican Church, Boyne Island =

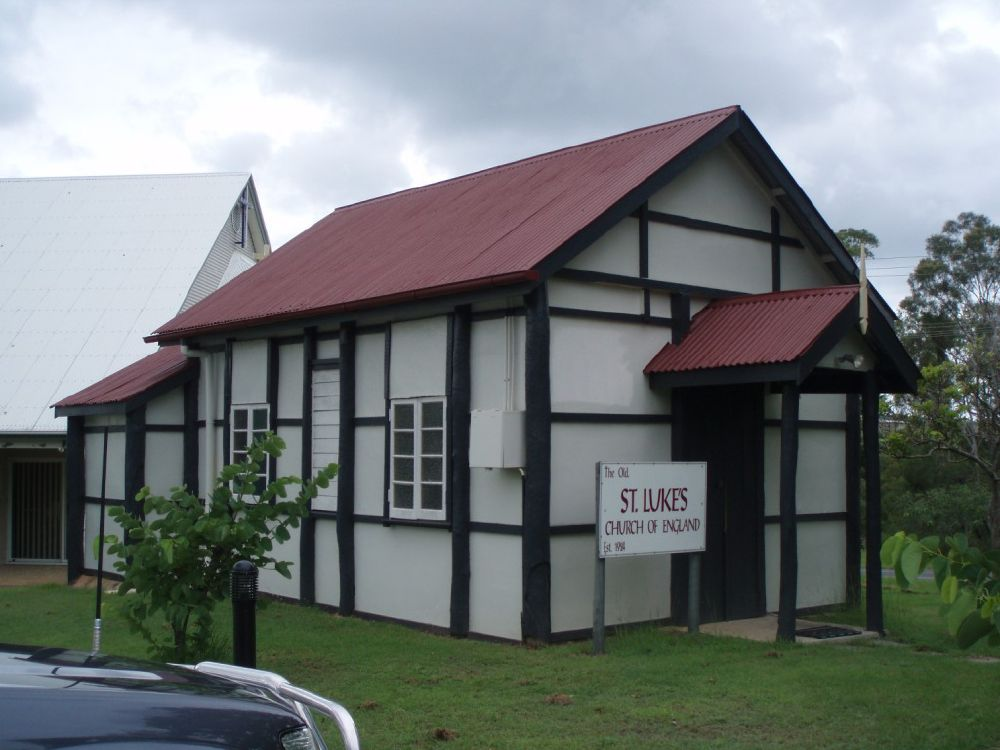
- St Luke's Anglican Church, 2009

- Location within Queensland Location within Australia
- 23.9557°S 151.351°E
- Location: Sayre Crescent, Boyne Island, Gladstone Region, Queensland, Australia

History
- Design period: 1919–1930s (interwar period)
- Built: 1924

Site notes
- Architect: Arthur Malpas

Queensland Heritage Register
- Official name: St Luke's Anglican Church
- Type: state heritage (built)
- Designated: 21 October 1992
- Reference no.: 600385
- Significant period: 1924 (fabric); 1953–1956 (historical)

St Luke's Anglican Church is a heritage-listed church at Sayre Crescent, Boyne Island, Gladstone Region, Queensland, Australia. It was designed by Arthur Malpas and built in 1924. It was added to the Queensland Heritage Register on 21 October 1992.

== History ==
St Luke's Anglican Church on Boyne Island was erected in the early 1920s by the small farming community on the island.

Boyne Island, on the Gladstone coastline, was taken up illegally for pastoral purposes in the mid-1850s, the first official lease being granted in 1863. In 1870 much of Boyne Island was resumed by the Queensland colonial government and opened to selection, and from the late 1870s agriculturalists cultivated fruit and small crops on the island. In 1884, half the remaining pastoral lease was resumed, and several farms were established on this land in the late 1880s and early 1890s. In the 1880s, a timber mill was erected on the southwest part of the island, and a wharf reserve was proclaimed near the mouth of the Boyne River. In the early 1900s, several more farms were taken up on Boyne Island or in its vicinity. At the time, Boyne Island was also a popular picnic destination for Gladstone residents and was used as a weekend retreat by townspeople. Around 1920, a small Saturday school was established on the island for the children of the farming community in a small shelter shed. Teachers came from Toolooa School or from Gladstone and church services are also said to have also been held regularly in a shelter across the road from the current church, which may well have been the same structure as that used for the school. The local families involved decided to build themselves a church.

The land on which the church is situated was part of an agricultural selection granted in 1908 to Henry Richard Thompson. It changed hands several times before being purchased by Harry Handley in 1922. The Handley family were farmers and donated about an acre for the church, officially subdividing and transferring ownership of the land to the Anglican Diocese of Rockhampton in 1925. Funds for the construction were raised both locally and in England, and materials, labour and furnishings were supplied mostly by local residents. The building was designed by Boyne Island resident Arthur Malpas, who also helped in the construction. Reputedly, Mr Malpas drew inspiration from photo-album pictures of half-timbered cottages at Worcester, England. The construction method and materials used to produce the effect however, were not traditional but those available locally.

St Luke's was dedicated on 12 October 1924 by Dr Philip Crick, the Bishop of Rockhampton. At the time coins and a newspaper were placed under the foundation stone. A large sea shell was utilised as a font. In the Interwar period, as cars became more common and with the construction of a traffic bridge over the Boyne River, Wild Cattle Beach (later Tannum Sands) became a popular holiday resort. The island's permanent population appears to have risen after the Second World War, and St Luke's Church served as Boyne Island's only school building from 27 January 1953 until the school was established in another building on 14 May 1956.

In 1961 the church was rehallowed by Canon Donald Kinglake Dunn, coins and a newspaper of that year being added to the time capsule under the foundation stone. Items such as prayer books, vases, a wooden cross, communion cup and paten, pews, candle sticks and christening font were given in memory of the early residents of Boyne Island who established the church.

Boyne Island has become urbanised following the establishment of the Boyne alumina smelter in 1982. During the construction period alone, the population increased from 1,400 to 6,000. Housing and public facilities have enormously increased on the island which is now effectively an industrial area.

In the late 20th century, St Mark's Ministry Centre was erected adjacent to St Luke's, which now has the role of a church hall rather than a church and is used for church group meetings, Sunday School and worship on special occasions.

== Description ==
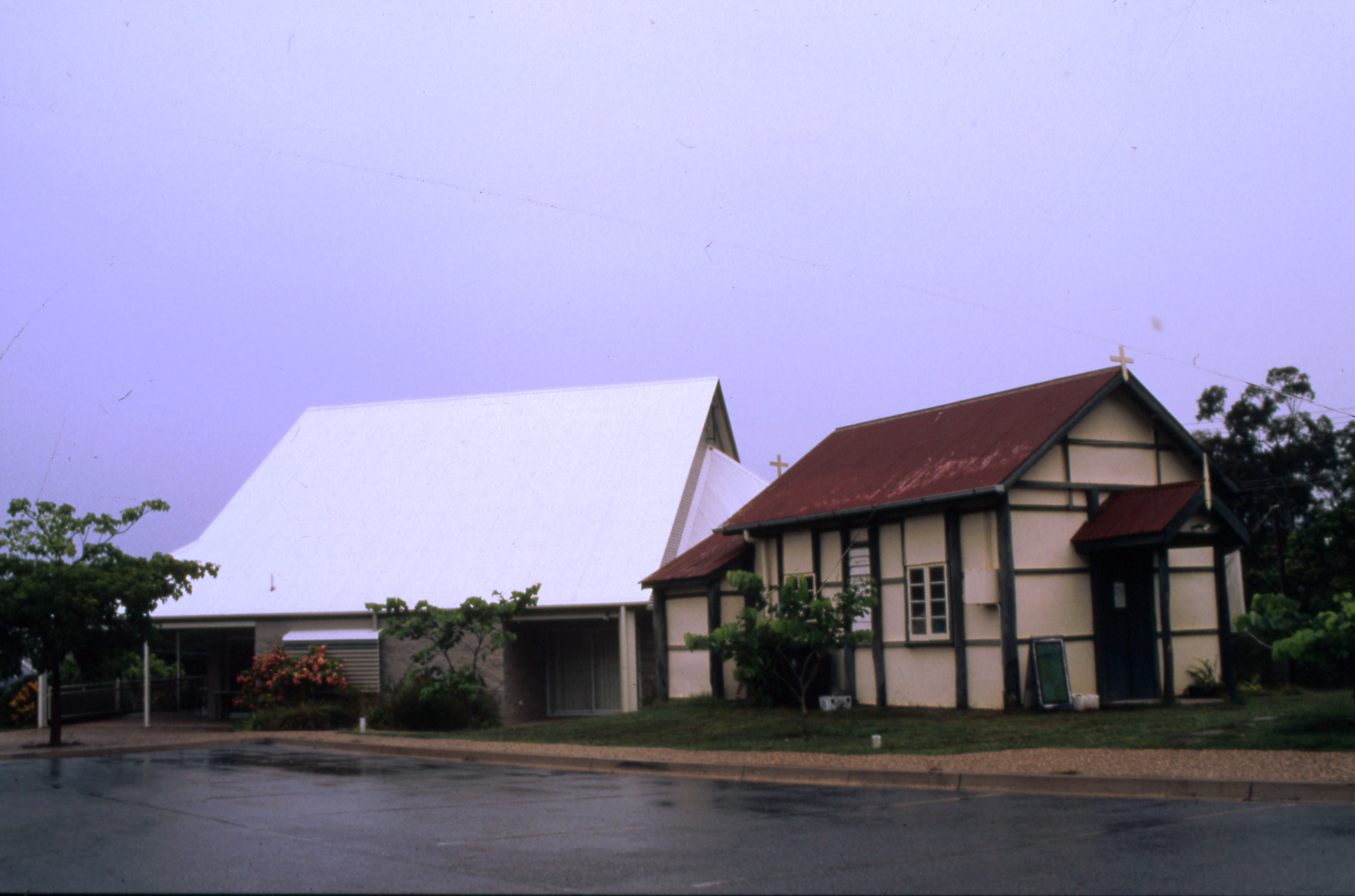
St Mark's (left) and St Luke's (right), 1992

St Luke's is a small church constructed in a simple, rustic style. It is timber-framed and clad with flat galvanised iron fixed with timber battens. The roof is gabled and clad with corrugated iron. The western entrance is sheltered by a small porch and there is a vestry with a separate gabled roof at the northeast end. The church has a seating capacity for 50 people.

The frame of the building consists of exposed hardwood bush posts sunk into the ground and other hardwood framing. The exterior is painted a light colour with dark stained timber battens to provide a decorative effect suggestive of half-timbering. It has a cement floor, galvanised iron roof, timber doors and window frames. Louvred panels on the side walls of the nave do not appear to be original and all other windows are casements.

The interior is plain and comprises a nave, chancel and attached vestry. The walls appear to be lined with fibrous cement, but the ceiling is unlined.

== Heritage listing ==
St Luke's Anglican Church was listed on the Queensland Heritage Register on 21 October 1992 having satisfied the following criteria.

The place is important in demonstrating the evolution or pattern of Queensland's history.

St Luke's church is a simple chapel constructed in an idiosyncratic style using volunteer labour and locally obtained materials by the farming community on Boyne Island. It illustrates the resourcefulness of pioneer communities in providing for their needs with limited resources. The main economic activity on Boyne Island is now industrial following the establishment of alumina smelters in 1982, and so the church illustrates a way of life on the island which has passed.

The place is important because of its aesthetic significance.

The church in its setting has a picturesque appeal effected by an imaginative use of available materials to create the impression of a rustic chapel and makes an attractive visual contribution to the character of the area.

The place has a strong or special association with a particular community or cultural group for social, cultural or spiritual reasons.

The church has a strong connection with the Boyne Island community having been designed and built by pioneer families and has served the community as a church, school and meeting place since 1924.
