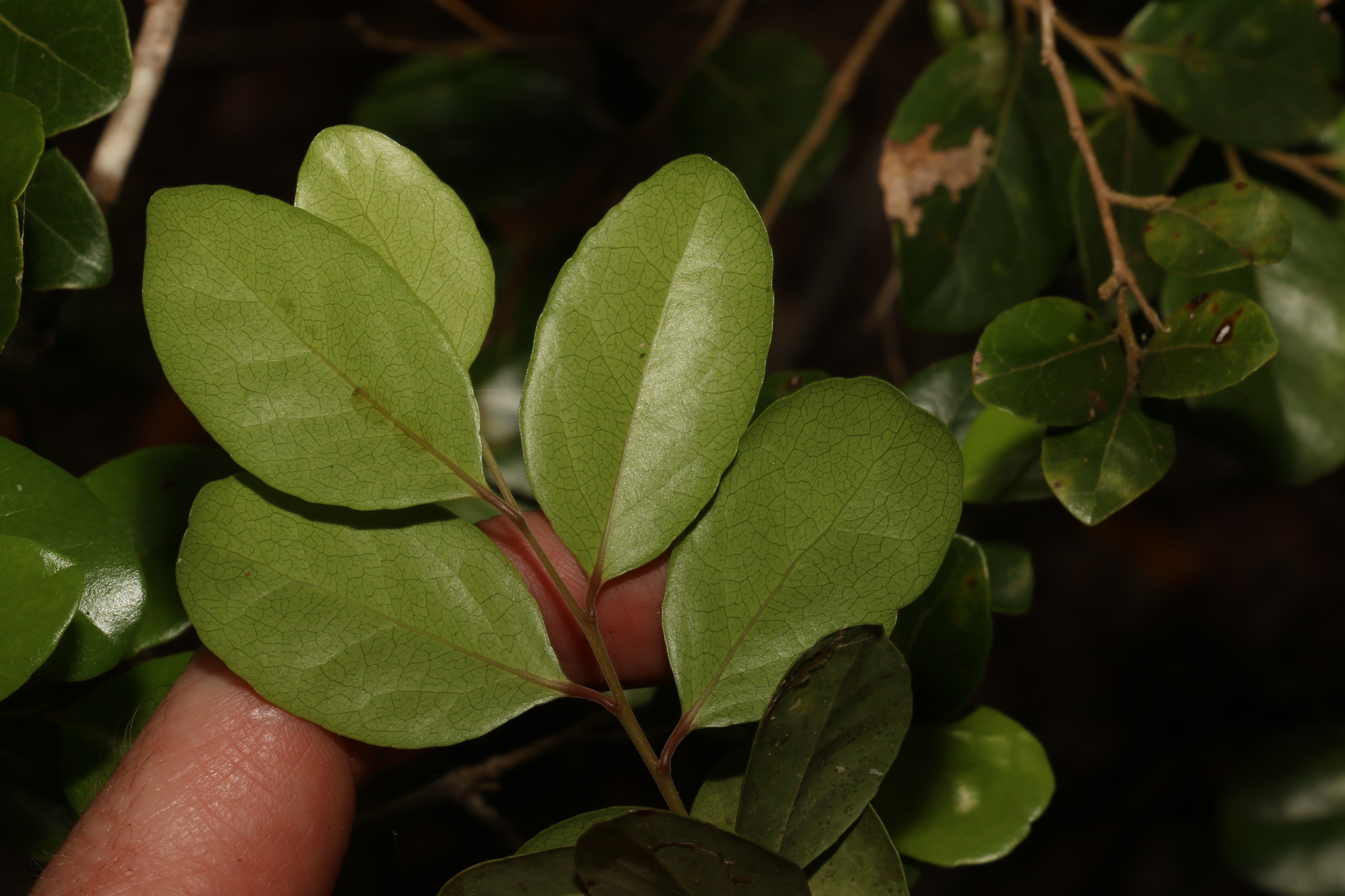
- On Flat Isles, northeast of Clairview, Queensland

Conservation status
- Near Threatened (NCA)

Scientific classification
- Kingdom: Plantae
- Clade: Tracheophytes
- Clade: Angiosperms
- Clade: Eudicots
- Clade: Rosids
- Order: Malpighiales
- Family: Salicaceae
- Genus: Xylosma
- Species: X. ovata

Binomial name
- Xylosma ovata Benth.

Synonyms
- Myroxylon ovatum (Benth.) Kuntze

= Xylosma ovata =

Species of flowering plant

Xylosma ovata is a species of flowering plant in the family Salicaceae, endemic to a small part of coastal Queensland, Australia. It was first described in 1863 and has the conservation status of near threatened.

== Description ==
Xylosma ovata is a shrub or small tree reaching up to 5 m (16 ft) in height, with slender, lenticellate branches and bark ranging from fawn to greyish. The stems are minutely pubescent (hairy) when young, but become glabrous with maturity. Leaves are simple (undivided), and arranged alternately on either side of the twigs; they are narrowly ovate to elliptic, occasionally obovate, and measure up to 5 cm (2.0 in) long and 2.5 cm (1.0 in) wide. They are cuneate to obtuse at the base, and may be pointed or rounded at the tip. The thinly coriaceous blades lack domatia and glandular structures, and have 4–6 pairs of lateral veins, and a fine, reticulate pattern of smaller veins. Stipules are ovate and free and less than 1 mm (0.04 in) long, petioles are about 3 mm (0.12 in) long.

Inflorescences are axillary and variable in form — the flowers may be solitary, clustered, or borne in short racemes (spikes), with female flowers commonly observed in groups of 5–6. The flowers are small and actinomorphic, i.e. they have multiple planes of symmetry; they are either male or female, and have 4 rounded tepals that are ciliate (fringed with hairs) on the margins. They are seated on pedicels (flower stems) approximately 2 mm (0.08 in) long, and are accompanied by ovate, ciliate bracts. The floral disc may be deeply lobed or partitioned. The superior ovary is ovoid and conical, culminating in a very short style with 2 bilobed stigmas. It contains 2 prominent placentas, each bearing 2 ovules and forming a complete dissepiment above the point of insertion, though remaining widely spaced below.

Fruits are fleshy, red, ovoid to globose, about 5 mm (0.20 in) in diameter, enclosing 1–4 seeds within the pulp. The species exhibits morphological affinities with Xylosma orbiculata and Xylosma parvifolia.

== Distribution and habitat ==
The native range of Xylosma ovata is restricted to Central Queensland, Australia, spanning the regions of Gladstone, Isaac, Mackay, Rockhampton, and Whitsunday, and is concentrated along the coast and inshore islands. Notable localities where it occurs include Eurimbula, Rodds Bay, and Turkey Beach in the Gladstone Region; Shoalwater and Stanage in the Rockhampton Region; and the Cumberland Islands within the Mackay Region. In addition to the mainland, its distribution reportedly extends to Lord Howe Island. Although not explicitly stated to have been introduced outside of its native range, it has been allegedly preserved in Bolivia and Indonesia.

It is a tropical species confined to coastal environments, where it inhabits littoral rainforests and dense vine thickets. It occurs at low elevations ranging up to 90 m (300 ft) above sea level.

== Taxonomy ==
Xylosma ovata was first described by George Bentham in 1863 as Xylosma ovatum. An attempt to transfer the taxon to Myroxylon was made in 1891, although it was later synonymized, and the genus change was not adopted. In 1938, the species was subdivided into 2 varieties: Xylosma ovatum var. ovatum and Xylosma ovatum var. parvifolium, subsequently standardized to Xylosma ovata var. ovata and Xylosma ovata var. parvifolia respectively. The latter was synonymized with Xylosma parvifolia in 1984, while the former was synonymized with its parent taxon. Xylosma ovata shares its name with a synonym of Xylosma rusbyana, which was initially described by Henry Hurd Rusby. Later, the genus underwent a grammatical gender concordance, initiated by William T. Stearn in 1992 when he questioned the genus's gender, and finalized by Dan Henry Nicolson in 1994, putting Xylosma ovata in agreement with the genus name.

Historically, Xylosma ovata was placed in Flacourtiaceae under older classification systems such as those of Cronquist and Takhtajan. Eventually, Flacourtiaceae, including this taxon, were reclassified into Salicaceae, a placement adopted by the APG III system and subsequently recognized by Plants of the World Online, though this classification remains disputed.

=== Etymology ===
The genus name Xylosma derives from xylon (Ancient Greek: ξύλον), meaning "wood" or "tree," and osmé (Ancient Greek: ὀσμή), meaning "smell," overall referring to the aromatic wood found in some species. The specific epithet, ovata, denotes its leaves, as it means "ovate" or "egg-shaped."

== Conservation status ==
Xylosma ovata is currently classified as Near Threatened under the Nature Conservation Act 1992. It is not listed under the Environment Protection and Biodiversity Conservation Act 1999 but is recognized as conservation significant at the state level.
