= Bangalee, Queensland (Gladstone Region) =

Bangalee
- Town
- Coordinates: 24.0052°S 151.4319°E
- Country: Australia
- State: Queensland
- City: Tannum Sands
- LGA: Gladstone Region

Government
  - State electorate: Gladstone
  - Federal division: Flynn
- Time zone: UTC+10:00 (AEST)
- Postcode: 4680

Bangalee is a beachside town on Wild Cattle Island within the locality of Tannum Sands, Gladstone Region, Queensland, Australia.

== Geography ==
Bangalee is on the south eastern tip of Wild Cattle Island which is separated from the mainland by Wild Cattle Creek. Most of the island is within Wild Cattle Island National Park. Bangalee is outside of the national park and consists of a number of houses along the beach.

The island can be accessed by boat or by crossing Wild Cattle Creek at low tide, a distance of 600 metres (2,000 ft). Visitors to the national park may not cross Wild Cattle Creek in vehicles, only on foot. Residents and guests of properties in Bangalee may cross the creek in 4WD vehicles to access their properties. There are no roads on the island but the eastern side of Wild Cattle Island is a long sandy beach providing access to Bangalee by 4WD.

== History ==
Bangalee is Aboriginal word, already used for the town of Bangalee in New South Wales, meaning the stream known to Europeans as Shoalhaven River (also Sandy Beach).

Bangalee was officially named as a township by Queensland Place Names Board on 1 April 1972.

== Education ==
The nearest government schools are Tannum Sands State School and Tannum Sands State High School, both in the town of Tannum Sands on the mainland.

== Amenities ==
Bangalee has no amenities, but shops and other services are available in the town of Tannum Sands.

== Hazards ==
Saltwater crocodiles have been sighted on Wild Cattle Island and in Wild Cattle Creek.
