= Bangalee =

Bangalee may refer to:

- Bangalee, New South Wales
- Bangalee, Queensland (Gladstone Region), a township within the locality of Tannum Sands
- Bangalee, Queensland (Livingstone Shire), a locality on the Capricorn Coast
