= Rodds Bay, Queensland =

Rodds Bay
- Suburb
- Interactive map of Rodds Bay
- Coordinates: 24.0916°S 151.6°E
- Country: Australia
- State: Queensland
- LGA: Gladstone Region
- Location: 46.4 km (28.8 mi) NNW of Miriam Vale; 50.5 km (31.4 mi) SE of Tannum Sands; 68.4 km (42.5 mi) SE of Gladstone CBD; 170 km (110 mi) SE of Rockhampton; 509 km (316 mi) NNW of Brisbane

Government
  - State electorate: Burnett
  - Federal division: Flynn

Area
  - Total: 155.7 km^{2} (60.1 sq mi)

Population
  - Total: 133 (2021 census)
  - Density: 0.854/km^{2} (2.212/sq mi)
- Time zone: UTC+10:00 (AEST)
- Postcode: 4678
Suburbs around Rodds Bay
Foreshores	Coral Sea	Turkey Beach
Foreshores	Rodds Bay	Eurimbula
Bororen	Eurimbula	Eurimbula

Rodds Bay is a coastal locality in the Gladstone Region, Queensland, Australia. In the 2021 census, Rodds Bay had a population of 133 people.

== Geography ==
The waters and inlets of the Coral Sea form the north-western, northern, and north-eastern boundaries. The waterbody Rodds Bay is to the north of the locality with the following headlands (from west to east):

- Innes Head (24.0372°S 151.5654°E)
- Middle Head (24.0365°S 151.5727°E)
- Williams Point (24.0448°S 151.5950°E)
- Becher Point (24.0426°S 151.6093°E)
- Blackney Point (24.0642°S 151.6369°E)

Mangrove Bay lies immediately north of these headlands (24.0423°S 151.5913°E).

== History ==
The waterbody Rodds Bay was named by Lieutenant Phillip Parker King on the HM Colonial Cutter Mermaid on 1 June 1819.

== Demographics ==
In the 2016 census, Rodds Bay had a population of 134 people.

In the 2021 census, Rodds Bay had a population of 133 people.

== Education ==
There are no schools in Rodds Bay. The nearest government primary school is Bororen State School in neighbouring Bororen to the south-west. The nearest government secondary schools are Miriram Vale State School (to Year 10) in Miriam Vale to the south and Tannum Sands State High School (to Year 12) in Tannum Sands to the north-west.
