= Glengarry Homestead =

Heritage-listed homestead in Queensland, Australia

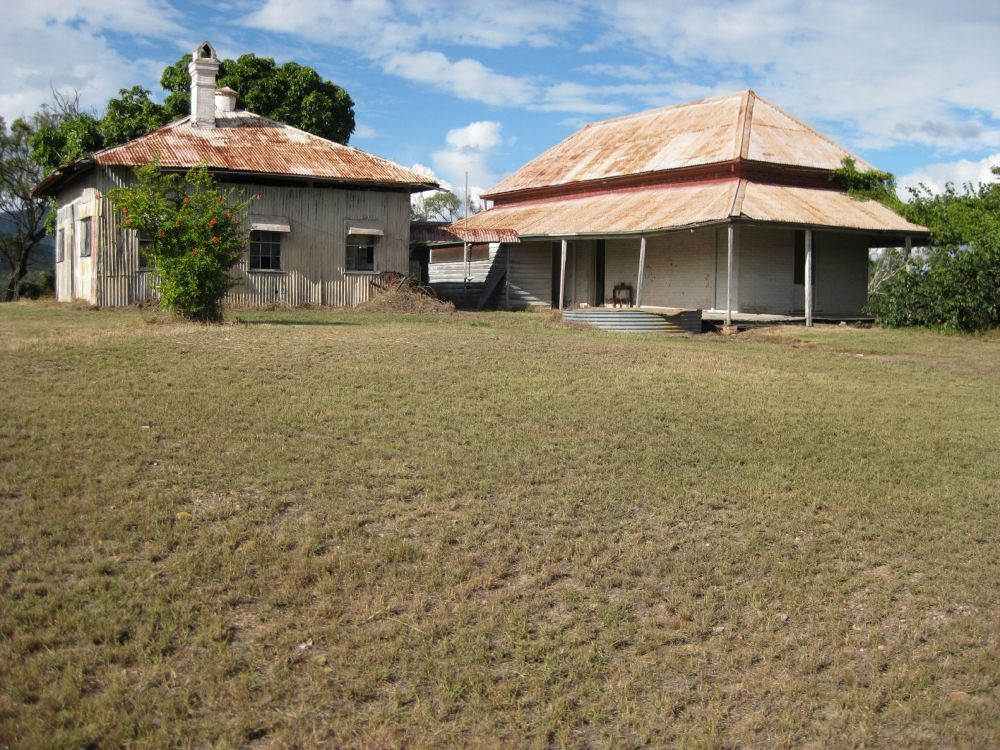
- Glengarry Homestead, 2009

- Location within Queensland Location within Australia
- 24.1981°S 151.2415°E
- Location: Gladstone–Monto Road, Boynedale, Gladstone Region, Queensland, Australia

History
- Design period: 1870s–1890s (late 19th century)
- Built: c. 1894–c. 1920

Queensland Heritage Register
- Official name: Glengarry Homestead
- Type: state heritage (built, landscape, archaeological)
- Designated: 21 October 1992
- Reference no.: 600386
- Significant period: 1890s–1910s (historical); 1890s–1910s (fabric); 1890s–1940s (social)
- Significant components: kitchen/kitchen house, garden – rock / rockery, views to, residential accommodation – main house, roof/ridge ventilator/s / fleche/s, views from, meat house, trees/plantings, shed/s

Glengarry Homestead is a heritage-listed homestead at Gladstone-Monto Road, Boynedale, Gladstone Region, Queensland, Australia. It was built from c. 1894 to c. 1920. It was added to the Queensland Heritage Register on 21 October 1992.

== History ==
The Glengarry homestead complex is situated on a hill overlooking the Boyne River Valley and the Gladstone–Monto Road and comprises a brick residence and timber outbuildings constructed in the 19th and early 20th centuries. The Port Curtis Pastoral District was developed in the early 1850s when the area was still part of New South Wales (the separation of Queensland did not occur until 1859). In 1853 a government survey of 7000 square kilometres was carried out. The leading pioneer pastoralist in the Boyne Valley was William Henry Walsh who arrived in 1853 and held several huge runs which comprised most of the Valley. The head station was Milton, applied for in 1856. In 1868 the boundaries of this run were surveyed and included the area which later became Glengarry station. Following the Crown Lands Alienation Act in 1868, large runs were broken up and resumed for selection as grazing properties. Because of the relative isolation of the valley, Milton remained intact longer than most properties in the area, but was divided for resumption in 1883 into comparatively large grazing blocks. John Dickinson applied for a portion at this time, but the application did not succeed, although in 1885 his daughter, Isabella, was granted a lease of 628 acres (254 ha). Dickenson already held Portion 9V, Grazing Farm 52 of 801 acres (324 ha), on the opposite bank of the river when he selected Portion 26V, Agricultural Farm 79 of 160 acres (65 ha), on which the homestead is located. This portion was gazetted on 15 July 1892 and was at the time recorded as having no improvements on it. The adjoining Portion 504 was also obtained by Dickenson in 1897.

In 1898, a report was made on the selection by the Bailiff of Crown Lands as part of the conditions of sale. Dickenson is stated to have resided there since 20 March 1894 and improvements to the land were reported to be a brick house, valued at £350, a detached kitchen clad in weatherboards, yards and a large hardwood shed in the approximate position of the stables, all roofed in galvanised iron. There were also a small pig sty and fowl house. The detached kitchen was presumably reclad in corrugated iron at a later date. It appears to be an earlier building than the house and was probably the original homestead, which was relegated to kitchen use and perhaps servant accommodation when the new homestead was built. This manner of replacement and reuse of buildings as the property developed was a practice so common as to have become traditional. The other outbuildings on the property were presumably constructed soon after the 1898 survey, and may even contain recycled material.

John Dickenson died in 1920, but the property passed to other members of the family and was held by them until 1946 when it was purchased by William Bryce. In the early 1960s, Glengarry was purchased by I O F McDonald who had a large modern annexe constructed at the eastern end of the residence. He also had a section of the verandah built in to provide bathroom and laundry facilities. Because of concerns about the viability of Glengarry as a working property following the construction of Awoonga Dam, it was purchased by the Gladstone Area Water Board on 1 August 1979.

The property has been leased for grazing purposes since 1983. The buildings are not inhabited although they have been used as temporary shelter from time to time by contract workers and have water and power connected. Although the dairy, stables, blacksmith's shop and buggy shed were still standing when recorded by the National Trust in 1979, they have since collapsed.

The Awoonga Dam project at its highest projected levels will make an island of the site from time to time. This level of inundation is not planned for about 50 years.

== Description ==
The Glengarry homestead complex consists of a brick dwelling with a modern annexe, a detached kitchen and a number of farm outbuildings. They are situated on a hill with extensive views of the surrounding countryside. The main residence is a single storey brick building, rectangular in plan, with a hipped roof clad with corrugated iron. It has verandahs to all four sides supported by timber posts. A section of the verandah on the northern side has been built in to provide modern bathroom and laundry facilities. The walls are painted except for the narrow band between verandah and main roofs and this reveals rose red bricks pointed in white cement. The bricks are laid on a course of local sandstone in a modified garden bond pattern, though this varies between walls. There is a camber arch fan over each external door. The interior has 3 rooms leading into each other. Cedar French doors open onto the verandah and the internal doors are constructed from vertical boards. The rooms are ceiled with beaded boards and have small pierced timber ceiling roses. The floorboards, believed to be local white cedar, are covered with lino imitating carpet.

There is a modern annexe at the eastern end of the building. This is constructed of fibrous cement sheeting and glass on a timber frame and is set on low concrete stumps. It is separated from the older section by a breezeway, its flat metal deck roof abutting that of the verandah facing it. A small section of the edge of the verandah roof has been removed where it touches the roof of the annexe.

Behind the brick building is a detached kitchen connected to it by a covered way. This has a frame of hardwood poles and a pyramid roof with a decorative metal ventilator and brick chimney. The roof and walls are clad with corrugated iron. The floor is of rammed earth topped with a layer of bricks and concrete. It has a main room with an open brick fireplace and chimney and two further rooms to the north. There are sash windows to the west and south walls, those on the west shaded by metal sunhoods with a pierced thistle motif. The north and east walls have modern hopper windows in the original openings.

To the north east of this building is the butcher's shop, constructed of timber and sheet iron. The central section has an arched roof of corrugated iron supported by a pole frame and is flanked by two skillion roofed sections. That to the south has corrugated iron sheeting to the walls, that to the north is now open but has the remains of timber slabs.

About 5 metres (16 ft) further north is a single storey timber building set on low stumps. It has a hipped roof with a skillion extension clad in corrugated iron. The walls are clad with sawn weatherboards and it has a timber floor. Adjoining this are the remains of the buggy shed and blacksmith's shop, which have completely collapsed.

Approximately 50 metres (160 ft) to the north west is the dairy which has collapsed completely. It can be seen to have had a corrugated iron roof, flagged floor, hardwood pole frame and slab walls. To the south west, under a fig tree, are the remains of the stables, which appear to have a similar construction. There is a highset fibrous cement clad cottage, possibly interwar, about 100 metres (330 ft) north west of the homestead complex.

A tennis court in front of the main residence is visible only as a section of level ground edged with fragments of nailed-down white plastic tape which once outlined the court. Plantings such as two mango trees outside the kitchen, mulberry, citrus, lagaeostromia, hibiscus and Burdekin plums survive. There is a rockery feature to the south west of the homestead.

== Heritage listing ==
Glengarry Homestead was listed on the Queensland Heritage Register on 21 October 1992 having satisfied the following criteria.

The place is important in demonstrating the evolution or pattern of Queensland's history.

Glengarry homestead, as a complex of residential and working buildings constructed in traditional forms and materials and associated with the operation of a pastoral property, is important in illustrating the early pastoral settlement of the Boyne Valley in the Port Curtis region.

The place demonstrates rare, uncommon or endangered aspects of Queensland's cultural heritage.

Glengarry is the earliest homestead on its original site in the area as several earlier homesteads have been destroyed or removed. The main residence is thought to be the only brick homestead of its era in Central Queensland, the more readily available timber or local stone being generally preferred for construction.

The place has potential to yield information that will contribute to an understanding of Queensland's history.

The homestead in its setting, together with its outbuildings, has the potential to yield information about the life and work of pastoralists in the Boyne Valley.

The place is important in demonstrating the principal characteristics of a particular class of cultural places.

The formal main house with an earlier residence used as a detached kitchen, quarters, butcher's shop, blacksmith, dairy, stables and other sheds are good examples of their type.

The place is important because of its aesthetic significance.

The main residence is pleasing in form, scale and materials and is set on a hilltop with extensive views to the mountains over a broad sweep of countryside. It is a local landmark due to this high position.

The place has a strong or special association with a particular community or cultural group for social, cultural or spiritual reasons.

The homestead is important for its association with the life and work of the Dickenson family, early settlers in this area.
