= Bororen =

- Town
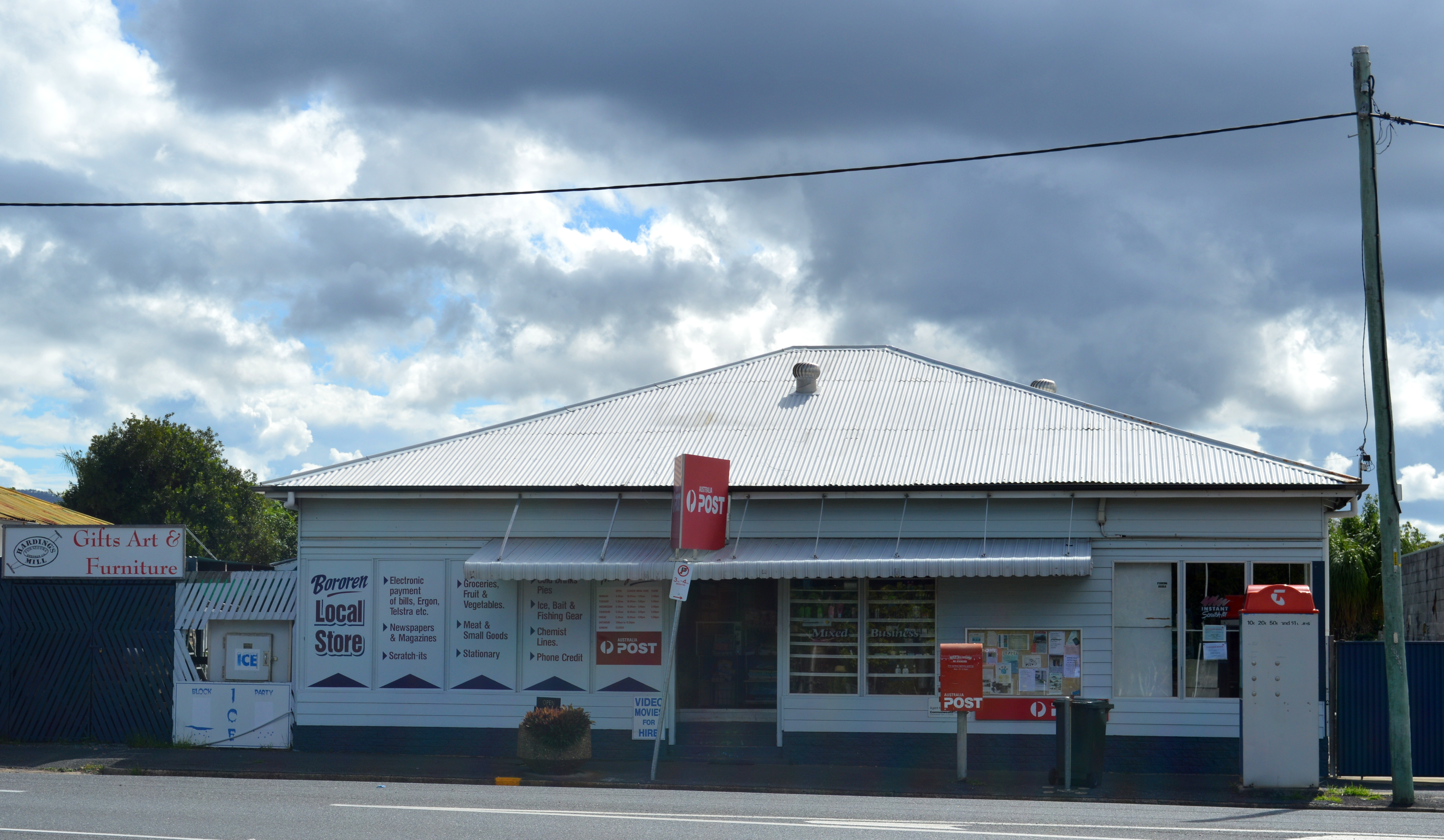
- Local store and post office agency on the Bruce Highway

- Interactive map of Bororen
- Coordinates: 24.2444°S 151.4952°E
- Country: Australia
- State: Queensland
- LGA: Gladstone Region
- Location: 13.3 km (8.3 mi) NNW of Miriam Vale; 37.2 km (23.1 mi) S of Tannum Sands; 55.0 km (34.2 mi) SSE of Gladstone CBD; 485 km (301 mi) NNW of Brisbane

Government
  - State electorate: Burnett
  - Federal division: Flynn

Area
  - Total: 330.9 km^{2} (127.8 sq mi)

Population
  - Total: 399 (2021 census)
  - Density: 1.2058/km^{2} (3.123/sq mi)
- Time zone: UTC+10:00 (AEST)
- Postcode: 4678
Localities around Bororen
Iveragh	Foreshores	Rodds Bay
Boynedale	Bororen	Eurimbula
Boyne Valley	Colosseum	Miriam Vale; Mount Tom

Bororen is a rural town and locality in the Gladstone Region, Queensland, Australia. In the 2021 census, the locality of Bororen had a population of 399 people.

== Geography ==
The town is located in the centre of the locality. The Bruce Highway enters from the south-east (Miriam Vale), passes through the town, and exits to the north (Foreshores).

The North Coast railway line also enters from the south-east (Miriam Vale), passes through the town which is served by the Bororen railway station (24.2429°S 151.4967°E), and exits to the north (Foreshores).

Boondilla is a neighbourhood in the north-west of the locality (24.2166°S 151.4333°E).

== History ==
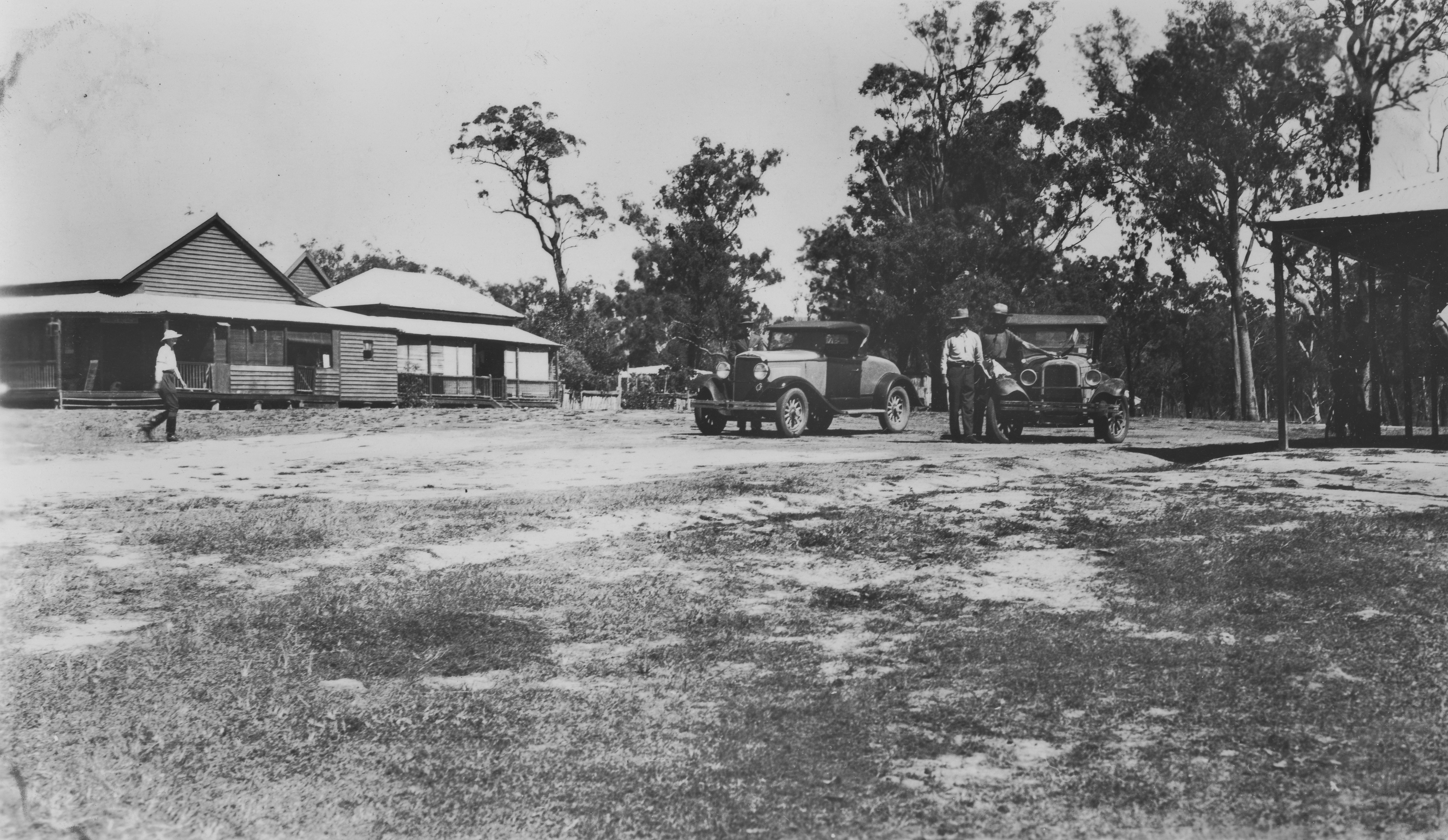
Street scene in Bororen in the Gladstone district ca. 1930

The name Bororen means old man kangaroo.

Bororen Post Office opened 2 June 1898; a receiving office had been open since about October 1897.

Bororen Provisional School opened on 22 January 1900. It became a State School in 1909.

Turkey Road State School opened in 1921 and closed on 24 May 1931. It was on Bates Road (approx 24.2181°S 151.5305°E).

Bororen Anglican Church opened on 2 July 1931. It closed in 2015 and the building was later removed from the site. It was at 17 Dougall Street (24.244685°S 151.4964°E).

Bororen Presbyterian Church opened on Sunday 21 October 1923. It has been demolished.

In about 1995, a war memorial was unveiled on the Bruce Highway, Bororen (24.243016°S 151.496029°E). It commemorates those servicemen and women who served in World War I and World War II.

== Demographics ==
In the 2011 census, the locality of Bororen had a population of 417 people.

In the 2016 census, the locality of Bororen had a population of 398 people.

In the 2021 census, the locality of Bororen had a population of 399 people.

== Education ==
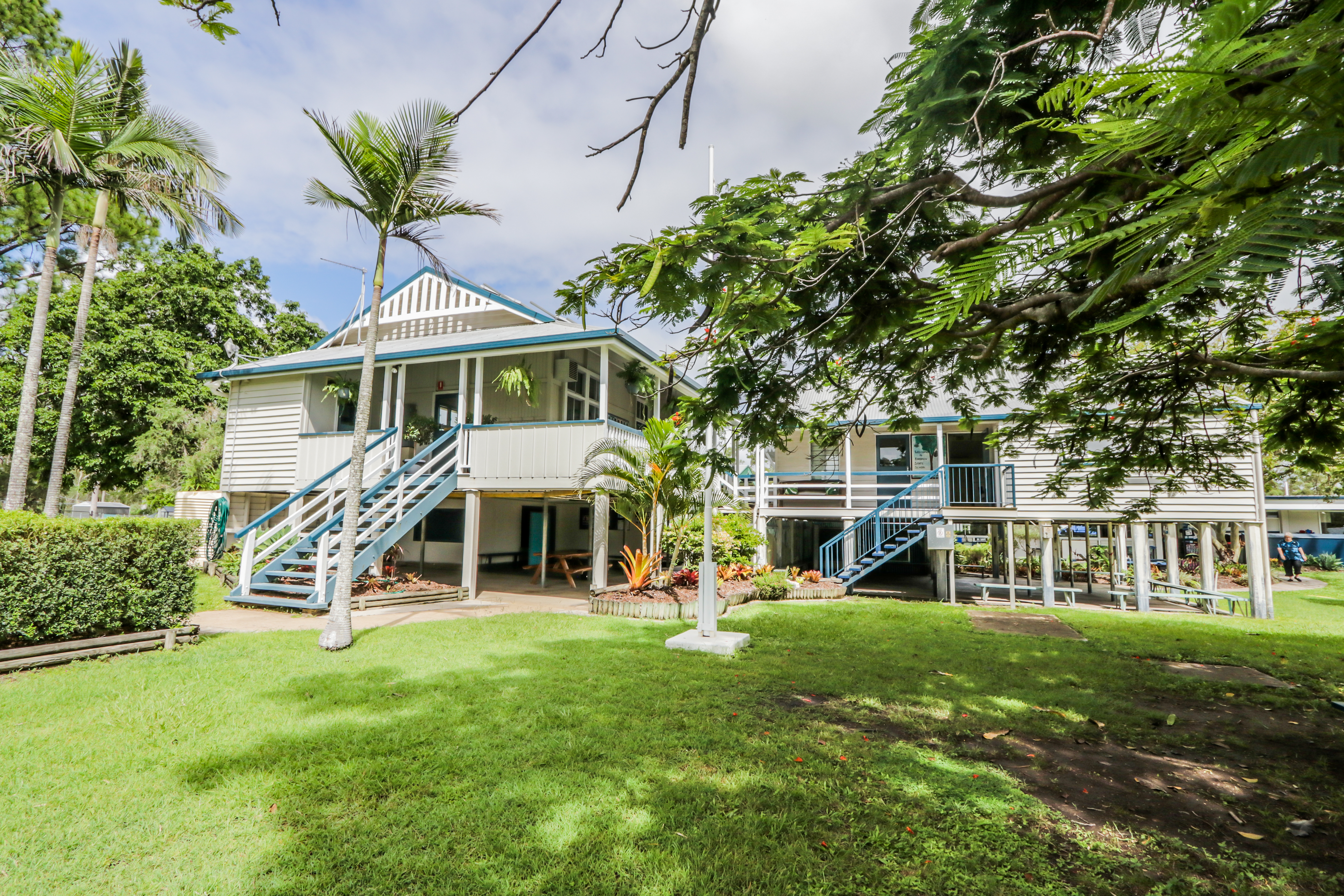
Front office (original school building), Bororen State School, 2020

Bororen State School is a government primary (Prep-6) school for boys and girls at 1 Kent Street (24.2443°S 151.4919°E). In 2017, the school had an enrolment of 37 students with 4 teachers (3 full-time equivalent) and 5 non-teaching staff (2 full-time equivalent). In 2018, the school had an enrolment of 31 students with 4 teachers (3 full-time equivalent) and 7 non-teaching staff (3 full-time equivalent).

There are no secondary schools in Bororen. The nearest government secondary schools are Miriam Vale State School (to Year 10) in neighbouring Miriam Vale to the south-east and Tannum Sands State High School (to Year 12) in Tannum Sands to the north.
