= William Wyndham's gravesite =

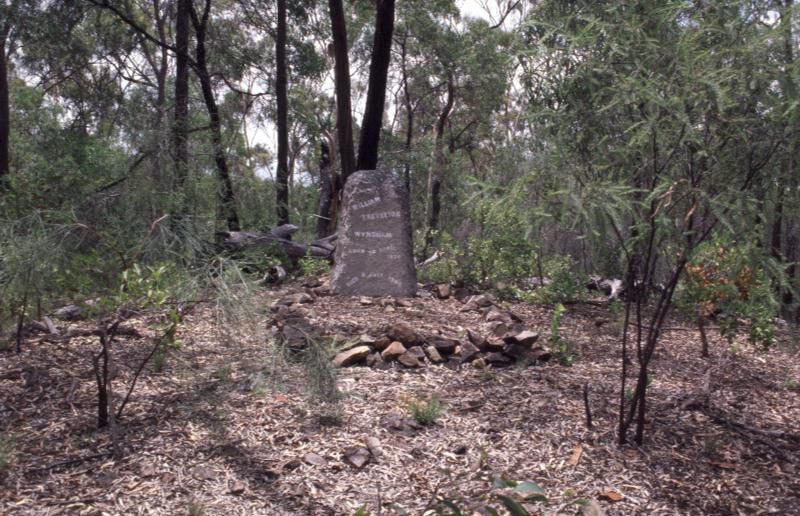
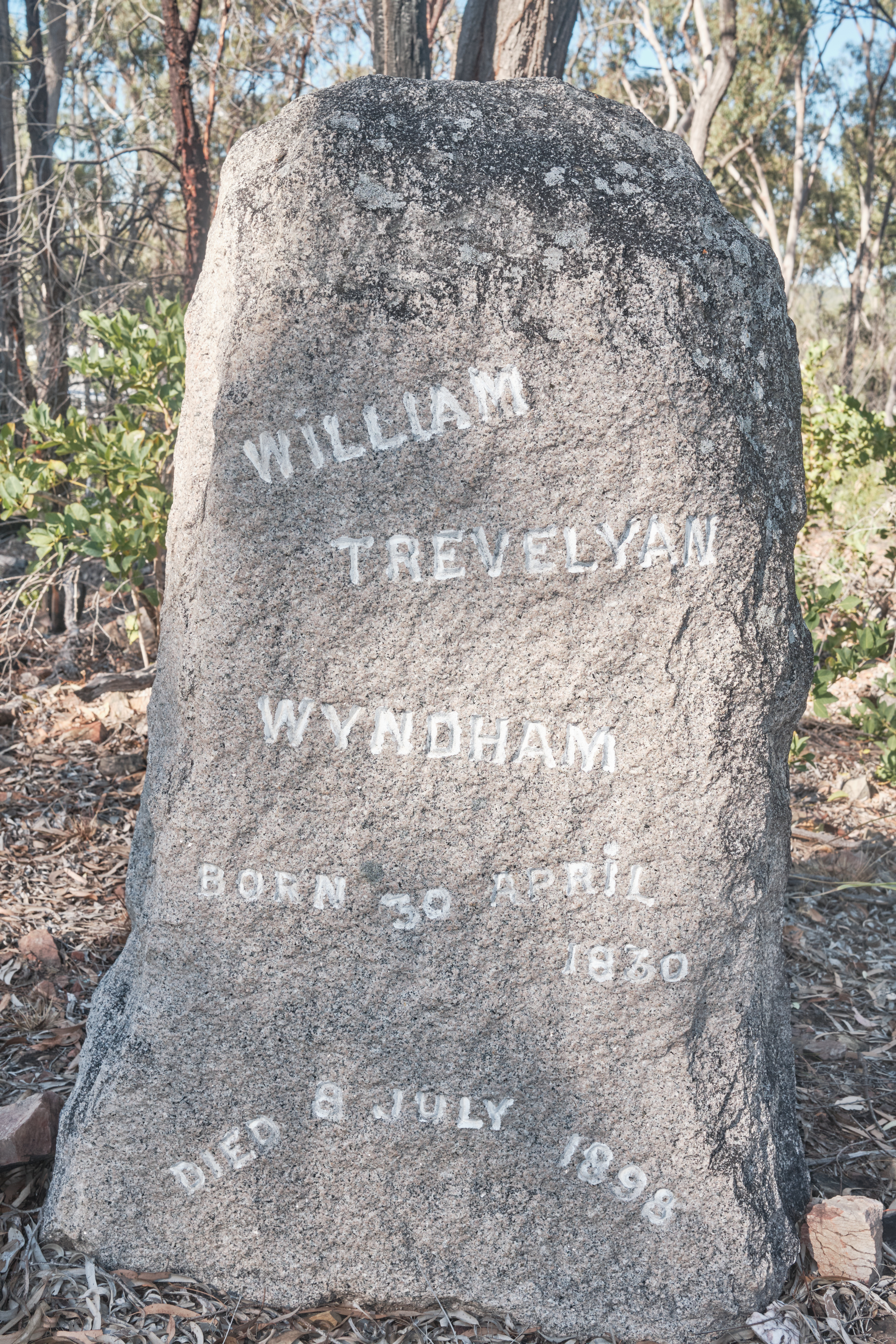
- William Wyndhams gravesite, 2004 William Wyndham's Gravestone, 2025

- Location within Queensland Location within Australia
- 23.9341°S 151.3468°E
- Location: Boyne Island, Gladstone Region, Queensland, Australia

Queensland Heritage Register
- Official name: William Wyndhams gravesite and remnant orchard trees, Carnym, Wyndhams Farm
- Type: state heritage (landscape, archaeological)
- Designated: 23 June 2000
- Reference no.: 601811
- Significant period: 1880s–1890s (fabric)

William Wyndham's gravesite is a heritage-listed lone grave at Boyne Island, Gladstone Region, Queensland, Australia. It is also known as Carnym and Wyndhams Farm. It was added to the Queensland Heritage Register on 23 June 2000. It is within the Wyndham Park Heritage Site, accessed between 36 and 38 Alkina Street.

== History ==
Although Boyne Island is best remembered for William Trevelyan Wyndham's association with it, initially the selection was taken up by Charles Hedley, a naturalist originating from Yorkshire. In 1882 Hedley and J.R.B. Dawson took up selection blocks on Boyne Island resumed under the 1868 Crown Lands Act. Hedley, enjoying a "liberal allowance" from his father, sampled outback life and tried an oyster lease at Moreton Bay before trying fruit growing at Boyne Island. In 1888 an accident to his left arm rendered him unfit for manual work and he went to Brisbane and worked for the Queensland Museum, pursuing a career in natural history, concentrating on Australian fauna. Hedley wrote confidently on a range of topics including botany, ethnology, and conchology. The culmination of his career was his appointment as Scientific Director of the Great Barrier Reef Committee.

In 1888 William Trevelyan Wyndham acquired Hedley's selection of 240 acres in the south east corner of the Island near the mouth of the Boyne River. Migrating to Australia in 1849 Wyndham first lived with an uncle in the Hunter River area in New South Wales. His interest in Indigenous culture led to him to live with tribal Aboriginal people in New South Wales for seven years. He married, but after the financial failure of his farm and subsequent break-up of his marriage he came to the Fitzroy River area in Queensland in 1875 and lived by fishing and shooting, spending time with a tribe on Keppel Island. Wyndham worked industriously to improve and establish a large orchard on the Boyne Island property, naming it "Carnym", reported to be an Aboriginal name meaning "sand".

Pineapples, grafted orange trees, bananas and rare plants and seeds were imported from Kew Gardens in England. Wyndham later sent Boyne Island-grown plants such as lilies, back to Kew. The seeds of the mango trees came by boat from India and were given to Wyndham by Hedley. Whether the tamarind trees were planted by Hedley or Wyndham is unclear. The section of property that fronted the river was known as Plum Tree, presumably after the native Burdekin plums which are plentiful in the nearby scrub.

Wyndham's life as a fisherman made Carnym the ideal location, and he earned extra income delivering produce from his property to market through coastal waters to Gladstone. In 1889 he prepared a paper titled "The Aborigines of Australia". which he presented to the Royal Society of New South Wales in Sydney in June. Wyndham's paper applied chiefly to the Aborigines of northern New South Wales with whom he had with lived for seven years. He explained their traditions and customs and clearly stated their belief in a supreme being. Most importantly, his linguistic skills led him to the conclusion that the different Aboriginal languages had been derived from one original stock. That he was considered an authority is confirmed by the Smithsonian Society of America's correspondence with him on the possibility of Australian Aboriginal languages being derived from Tamil.

Wyndham died 8 July 1898 and was buried in the orchard at Carnym. Some time later his daughter Bessie had his remains relocated on a hill at the Western end of the property. Wyndham himself had prepared in advance by transporting a block of granite estimated to weigh 1.5 tonnes from Magnetic Island and carried by his boat. This was dumped at the mouth of the Boyne River at high tide and later dragged by bullock team to the highest point on the island to become his headstone. The family association with Boyne Island continued for three generations, later members continuing to grow pineapples on the site, Bessie continuing to live at Carnym until 1941. In 1972 Comalco purchased the farm to build an aluminium smelter, production commencing ten years later. The site where the grave lies is owned by Comalco and is listed by them as a buffer zone between the smelter and the suburb.

The area where Wyndham's house was situated was sold and subdivided in the mid 1970s and the modest weatherboard house demolished in the early 1980s. A park in the area bears his name, with tamarind and mango trees from the original orchard still adorning the park and surrounding suburb.

== Description ==
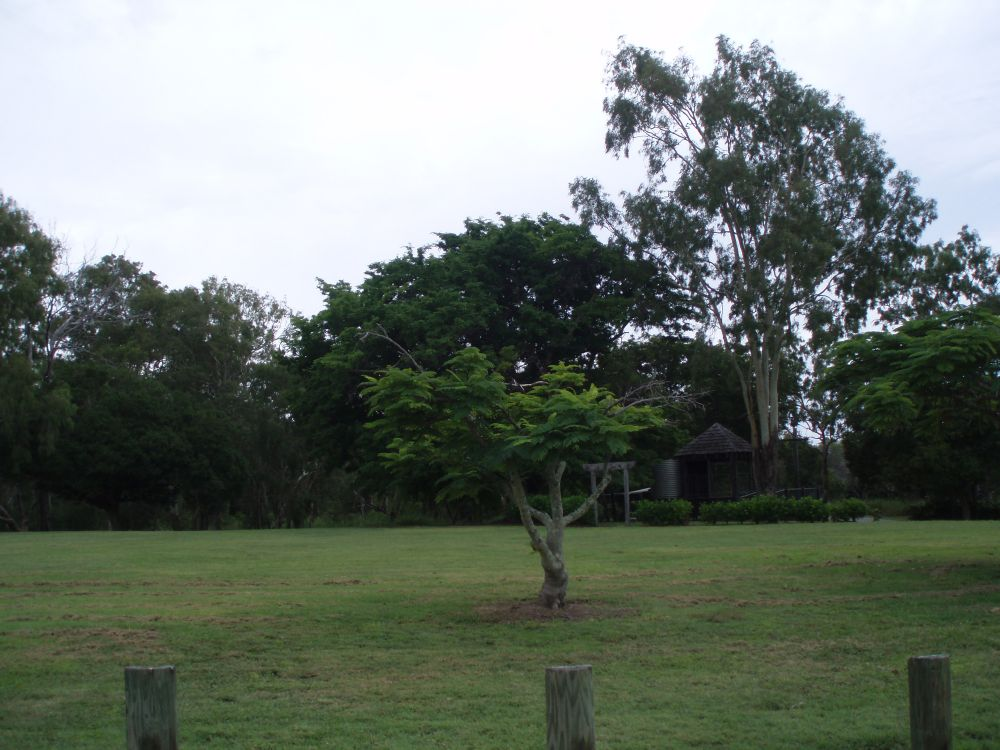
Remaining orchard trees

The heritage listing identifies two areas: the gravesite and the orchard.

William Trevelyan Wyndham's gravesite lies in a small clearing amid native flora at the highest point of Boyne Island facing east (23.9341°S 151.3468°E). The headstone consists of roughly hewn granite and local individual stones placed five feet in front of the grave in a rectangular shape. The stone reads "William Trevelyan Wyndham Born 3 April 1830 Died 8 July 1898".

Nine mango (Mangifera indica) and two tamarind trees (Tamarind indicus) from Wyndham's original orchard are located throughout the suburb. Two tamarind trees are located in the corner of Wyndham Park near the southern boundary of the park at Olunda Street (23.9369°S 151.3535°E).

== Heritage listing ==
William Wyndham's gravesite and remnant orchard trees was listed on the Queensland Heritage Register on 23 June 2000 having satisfied the following criteria.

The place is important in demonstrating the evolution or pattern of Queensland's history.

The remnant trees demonstrate the uncommon aspect of a nineteenth century orchard and garden that was used simultaneously for hobby, scientific and commercial reasons.

The Tamarind trees have the potential to yield comparative botanical and genetic information with examples of a similar age in other countries.

Prominently situated on the highest point of Boyne Island, Wyndham's grave is located in a small clearing, its aesthetic appeal enhanced by its surroundings amid indigenous flora. Two Tamarind trees from the original orchard are located in Wyndham park, their age and size contributing to the park's visual appeal.

Wyndham Park is valued by the community for social and recreational purposes. Links to the former use of the site are expressed by a cottage style play structure symbolising Wyndham's dwelling, remnant Tamarind trees and the park bearing his name.

Boyne Island has a special association with the work of William Trevelyan Wyndham and Charles Hedley, both principal pioneers in the early development of Central Queensland and the Calliope area. William Trevelyan Wyndham's gravesite and the Tamarind trees are physical links to his work and interests, in particular his association with and anthropological observations of the languages and customs of Aboriginal tribes in New South Wales and Central Queensland. The site is also significant in regards to the previous owner, naturalist Charles Hedley.
