= Boyne Island, Queensland =

Boyne Island
- Town
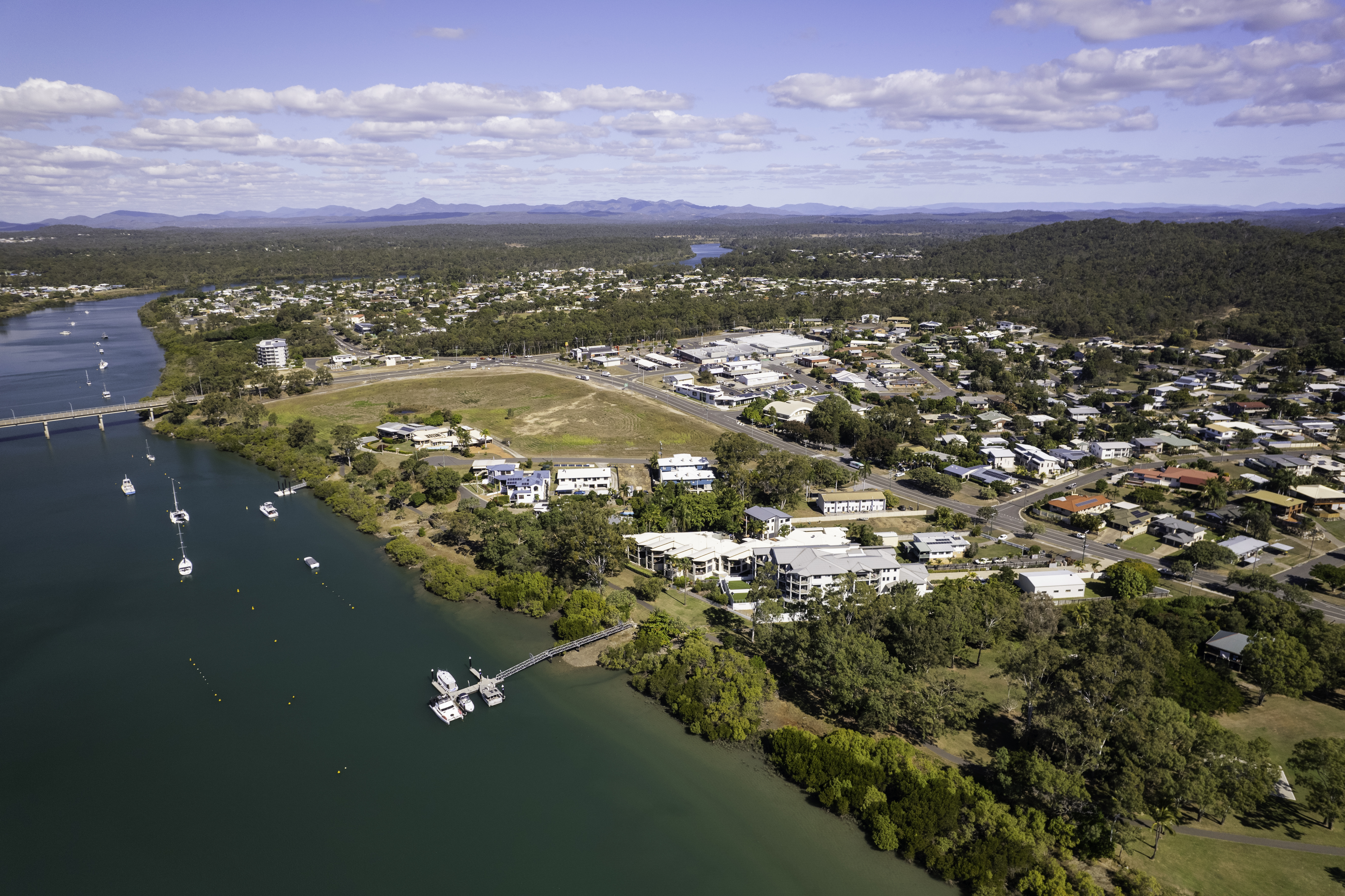
- Boyne Island from the air - May 2023

- Interactive map of Boyne Island
- Coordinates: 23.9477°S 151.3550°E
- Country: Australia
- State: Queensland
- LGA: Gladstone Region
- Location: 2.1 km (1.3 mi) W of Tannum Sands; 24.0 km (14.9 mi) SE of Gladstone CBD; 498 km (309 mi) NNW of Brisbane

Government
  - State electorate: Gladstone
  - Federal division: Flynn

Area
  - Total: 49.4 km^{2} (19.1 sq mi)

Population
  - Total: 4,835 (2021 census)
  - Density: 97.87/km^{2} (253.49/sq mi)
- Time zone: UTC+10:00 (AEST)
- Postcode: 4680
Localities around Boyne Island
South Trees	South Trees	Coral Sea
O'Connell	Boyne Island	Coral Sea
Wurdong Heights	Tannum Sands	Tannum Sands

Boyne Island is a coastal town and locality in the Gladstone Region, Queensland, Australia. Boyne Island is 25 kilometres (16 mi) south of Gladstone. In the 2021 census, the locality of Boyne Island had a population of 4,835 people.

== Geography ==
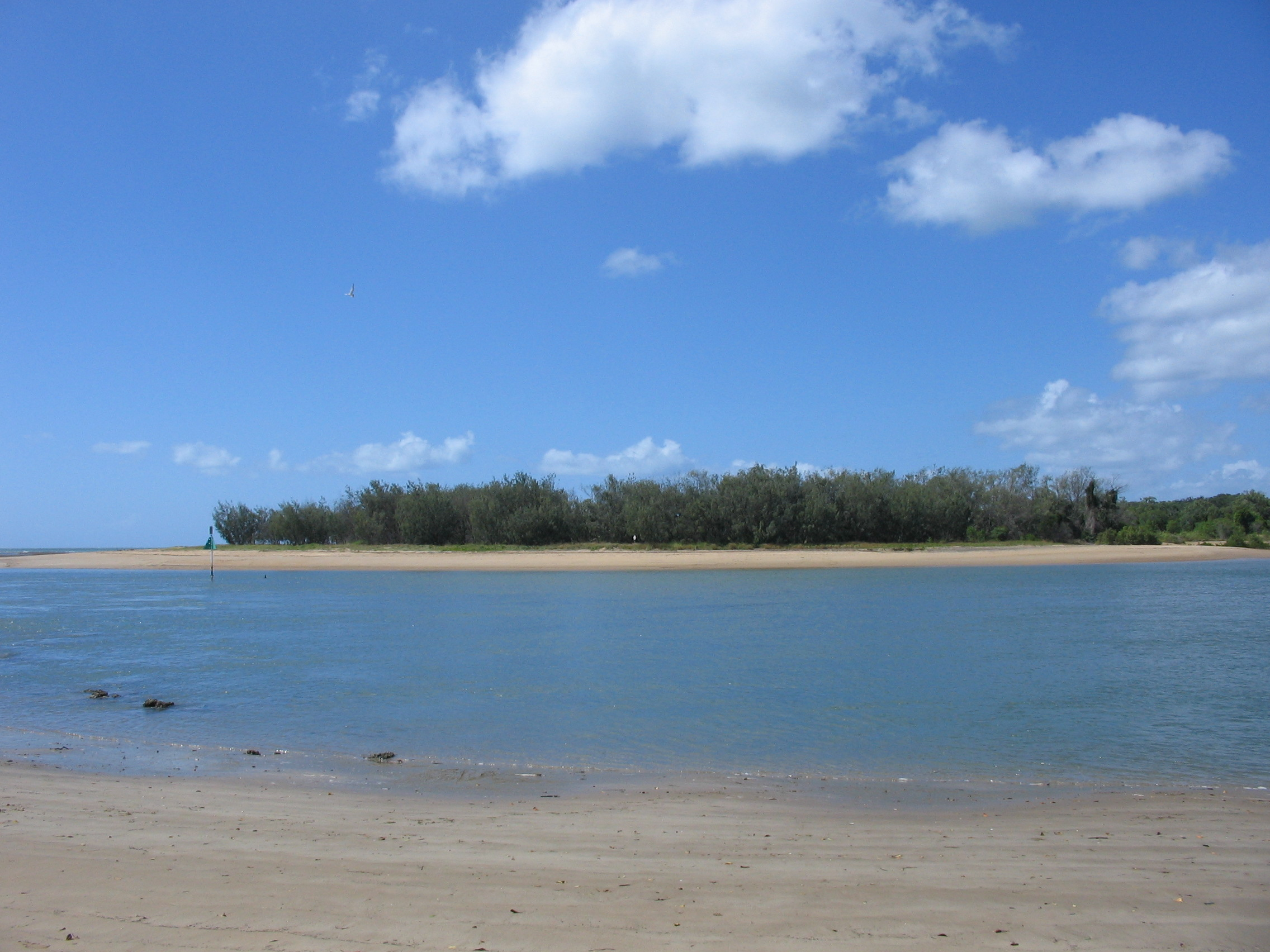
Mouth of the Boyne River, 2008

It is located on the west bank of the Boyne River and, is a particular type of island called a holm, an island in a river or an estuary. It is bounded on the eastern side by the Boyne River, for about 4 kilometres (2.5 mi) and the South Trees Inlet, on the southern, for 9 kilometres (5.6 mi), and western sides, for about 8 kilometres (5.0 mi) Tannum Sands is located on the eastern side of the mouth of the Boyne River spreading southward and is often referred to as Boyne Island's twin town.

== History ==
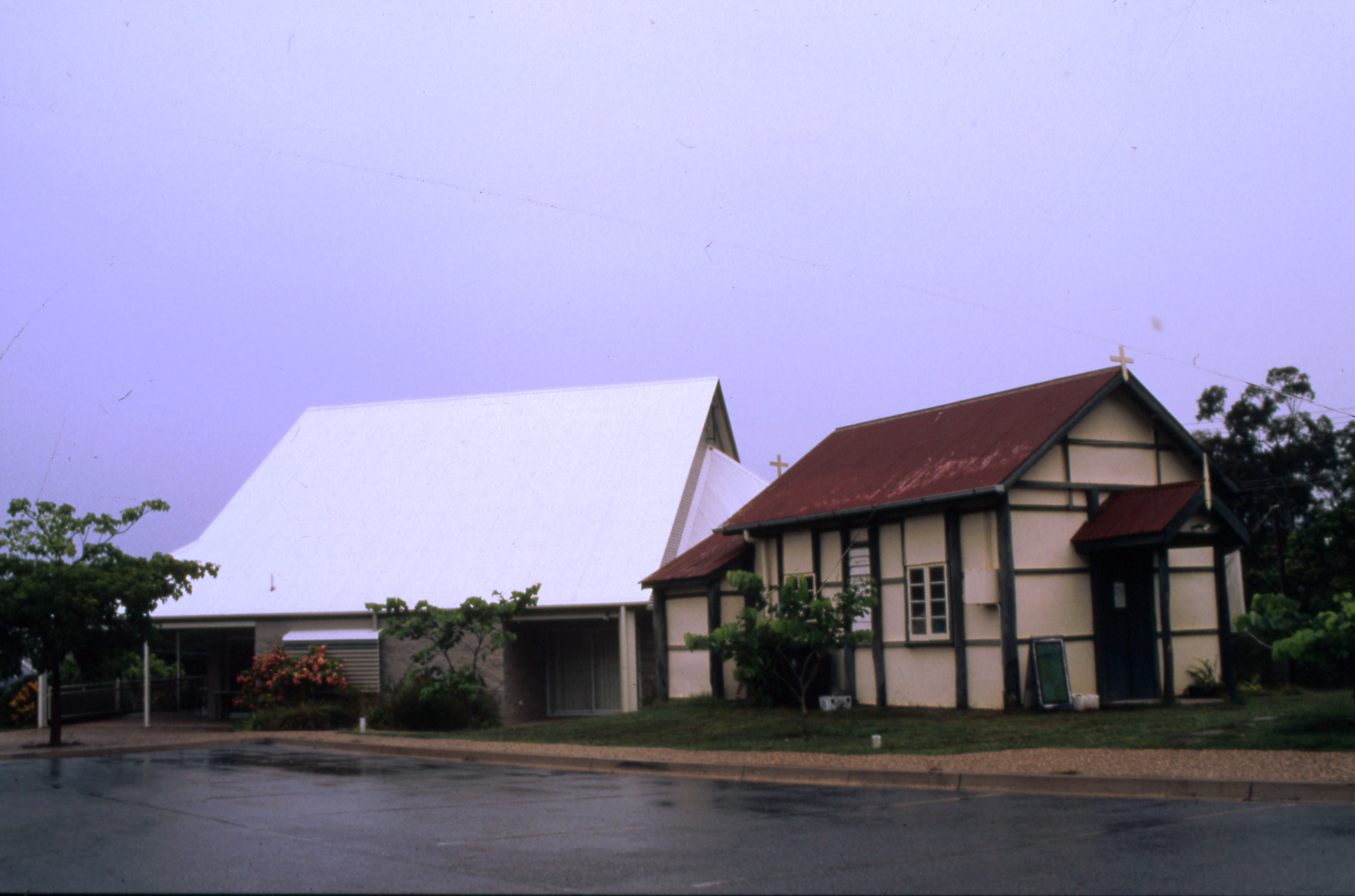
St Mark's Anglican Church (left) and St Luke's Anglican Church (right), 1992

The town was named for the Boyne River, which was named by John Oxley in 1823. Originally the island was used for sheep grazing, this was followed by small crops, horticulture, fishing and timber.

St Luke's Anglican Church was built in 1924 on Sayre Crescent. It was designed by Arthur Malpass. It was built from timber. Although the 1924 church building still stands, it was replaced in 1995 by a new brick church building called St Mark's adjacent to the old church building.

Boyne Island State School opened on 27 January 1953.

== Demographics ==
In the 2016 census, the locality of Boyne Island had a population of 4,760 people.

In the 2021 census, the locality of Boyne Island had a population of 4,835 people.

== Heritage listings ==
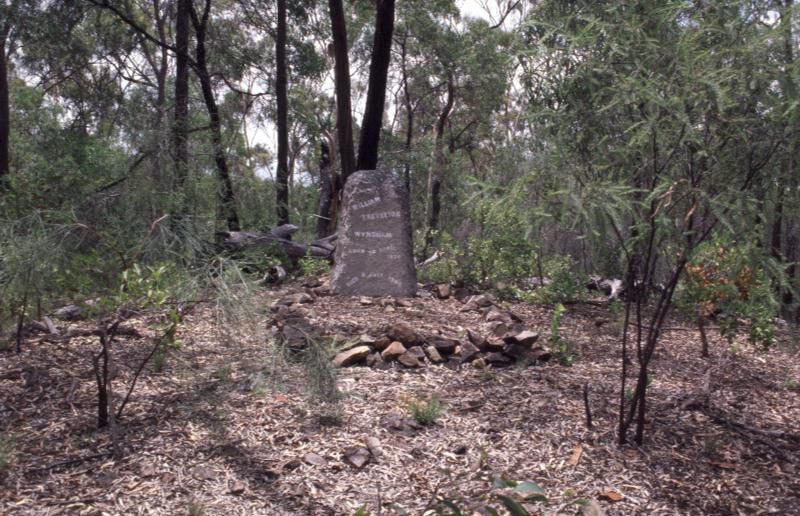
William Wyndham's gravesite, 2004

Boyne Island has a number of heritage-listed sites, including:

- William Wyndham's gravesite, Wyndham Park Heritage Site, accessed between 36 and 38 Alkina Street (23.9344°S 151.3528°E)
- former St Luke's Anglican Church, Sayre Crescent (23.9557°S 151.351°E)

== Economy ==
Today Boyne Island is primarily a residential centre for the nearby Boyne Island aluminium smelter and Gladstone industries.

Australia's largest aluminium smelter, Boyne Smelters Ltd., is located north of the town separated by a buffer zone.

== Education ==
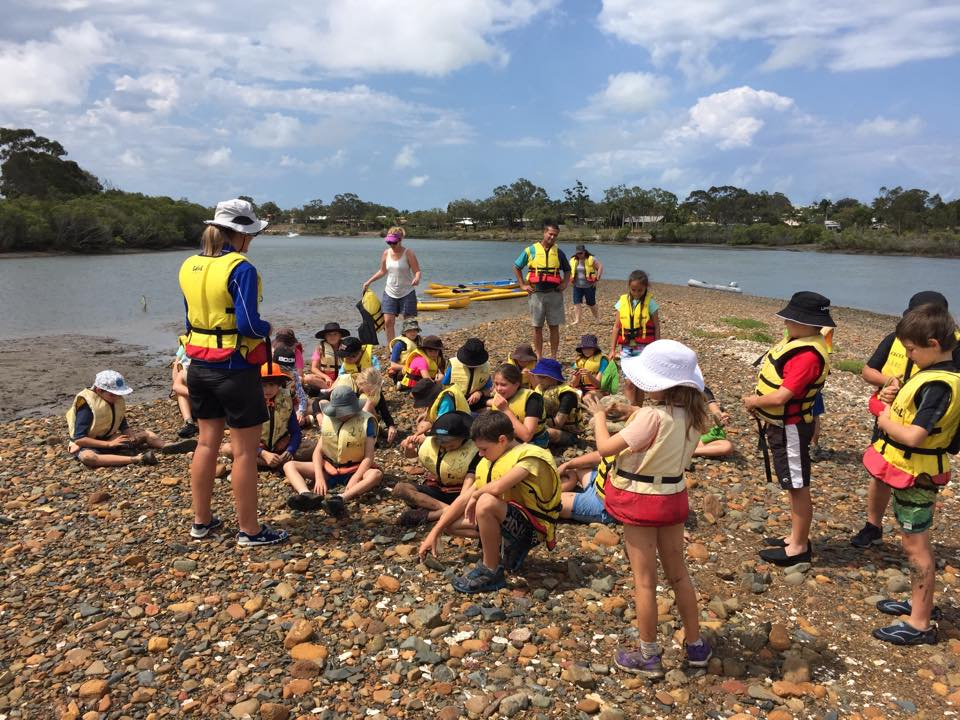
Moore Park State School Year 4 students at the Boyne Island Environmental Education Centre

Boyne Island State School is a government primary (Prep-6) school for boys and girls at 151 Malpas Street (23.9501°S 151.3564°E). In 2017, the school had an enrolment of 361 students with 25 teachers (21 full-time equivalent) and 20 non-teaching staff (13 full-time equivalent). In 2018, the school had an enrolment of 384 students with 25 teachers (23 full-time equivalent) and 21 non-teaching staff (13 full-time equivalent). It includes a special education program.

Boyne Island Environmental Education Centre is an Outdoor and Environmental Education Centre at 61 Malpas Street (23.9573°S 151.3502°E). It offers hands-on activities for students to learn about natural coastal, marine and reef environments of the area and to understand human use of these areas.

There is no secondary school in Boyne Island. The nearest government secondary school is Tannum Sands State High School in neighbouring Tannum Sands to the south-east.

There are also non-government schools in Tannum Sands.

== Amenities ==
The Gladstone Regional Council operates a public library on Boyne Island at the corner of Wyndham & Hayes Avenue.

St Mark's Anglican Church is on the corner of Malpas Stand and Sayre Crescent (23.955757°S 151.351°E).

There are a number of parks in the locality, including:

- Bauhinia Street Park (23.9548°S 151.3449°E)
- Boyne Island Conservation Park (23.9500°S 151.3475°E)
- Bray Park (23.9419°S 151.3533°E)
- Colyer Park (23.9560°S 151.3553°E)
- Dennis Park Sports Complex (23.9631°S 151.3336°E)
- Hayes Park (23.9461°S 151.3512°E)
- Jacaranda Drive Park (23.9653°S 151.3414°E)
- Kirrang Park (23.9541°S 151.3505°E)
- Lions Park (23.9517°S 151.3576°E)
- Malpas Park (23.9512°S 151.3560°E)
- Wyndham Park Heritage Site (23.9344°S 151.3528°E)

== Sport ==
Three football codes are represented. Boyne Tannum Football Club also known as the Sharks (established 1979) play in the local soccer competition. Boyne Island-Tannum Sands AFC also known as BITS Saints (established 1984), based at Boyne Island Oval, are the most successful club in the AFL Capricornia competition. Tannum Sands Seagulls (established 1994), based at Dennis Park, compete in the Gladstone District Rugby League competition.

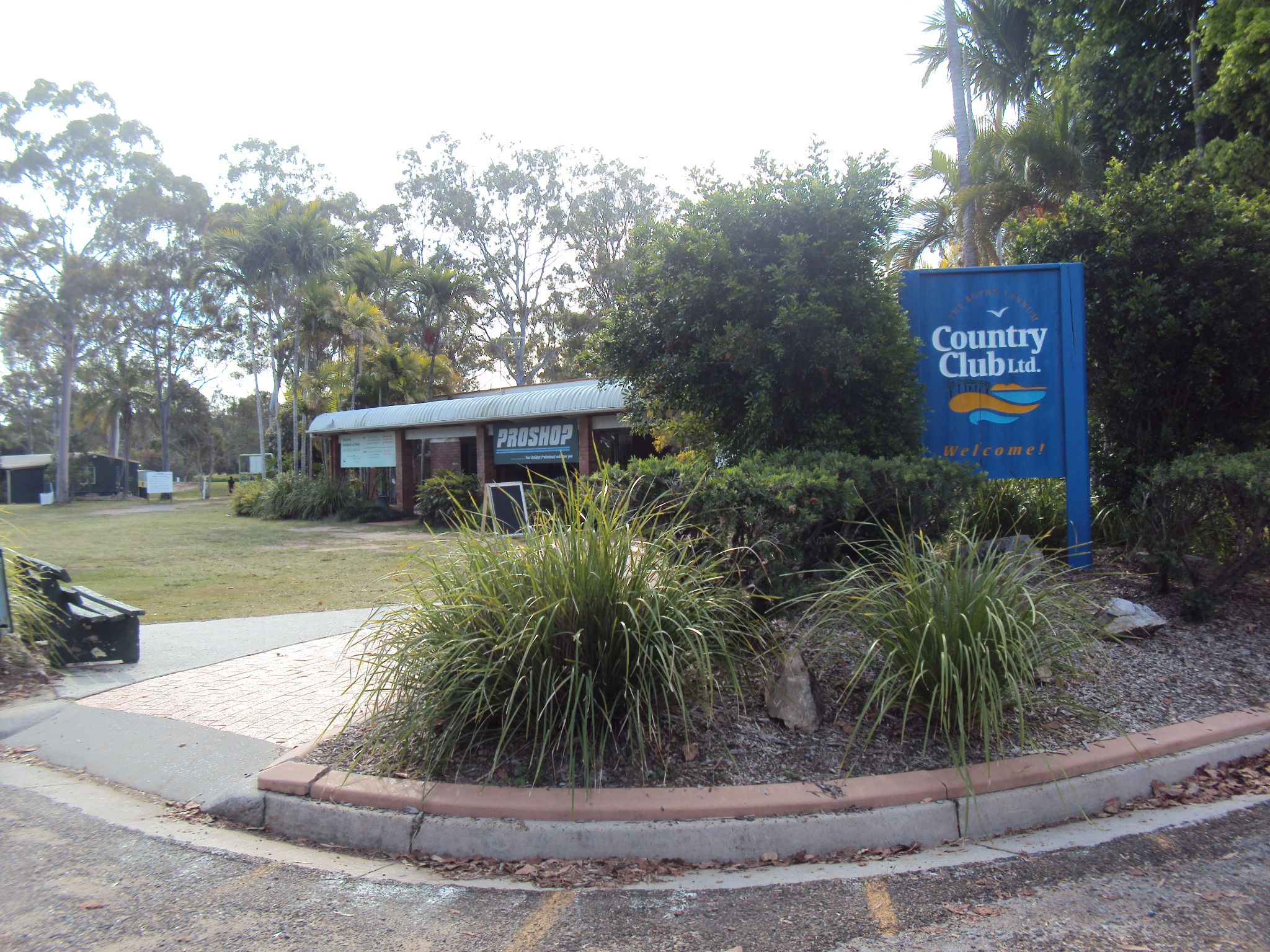
Entrance to Boyne Island Tannum Sands Golf Course

The 13-hole Boyne Island Tannum Sands Golf Course is adjacent to the Boyne River, in Jacaranda Drive.

== Events ==
Boyne Island is home to the Boyne Tannum Hookup, which is a large fishing event held on the Labour Day long weekend in May each year. The event is held at Bray Park, which is on the river near the skate park. This event is very popular, with more than 3,000 entrants.

== Notable people ==
- Natalya Diehm – Freestyle BMX competitor
