= Castle Tower National Park =

Park in Queensland, Australia

- IUCN category II (national park)
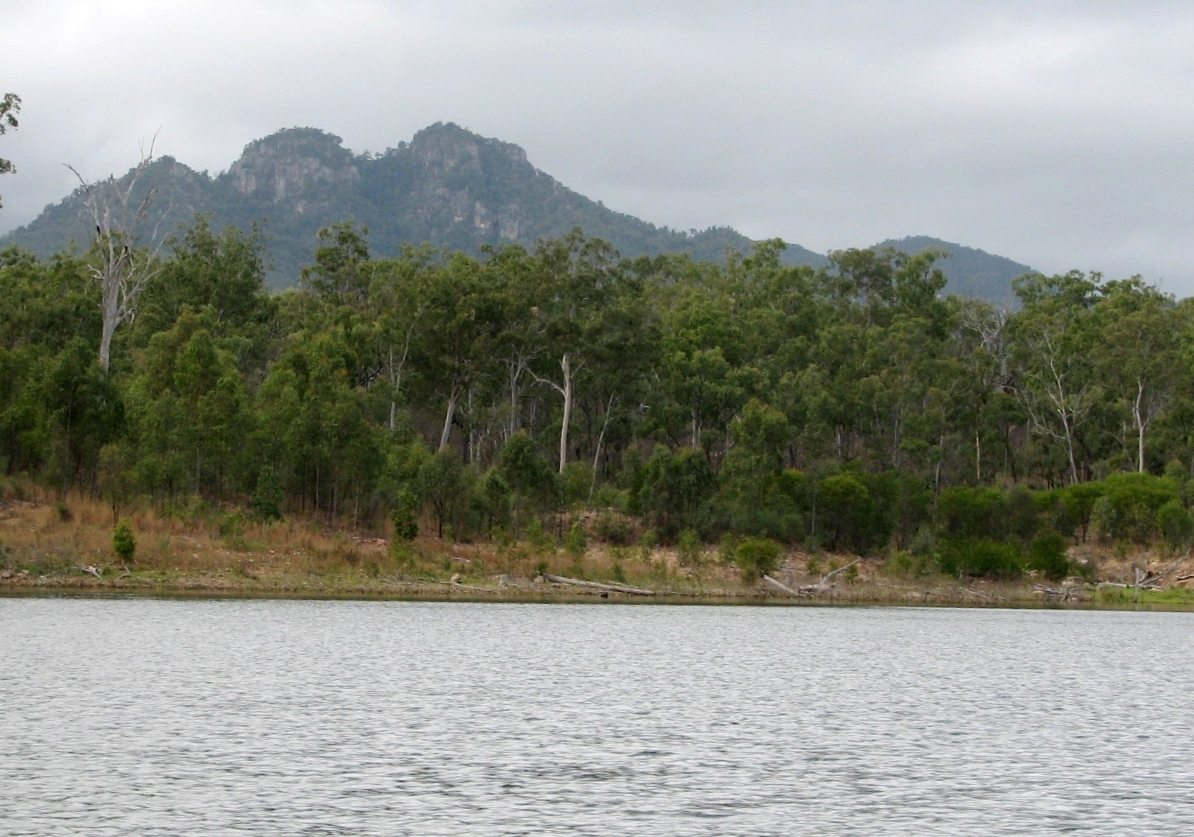
- Mt Castle Tower from Lake Awoonga

- Location within Queensland
- Location: Queensland
- Coordinates: 24°09′27″S 151°18′25″E
- Area: 49.80 km^{2} (19.23 sq mi)
- Established: 1932
- Governing body: Queensland Parks and Wildlife Service
- Website: https://parks.des.qld.gov.au/parks/castle-tower

Castle Tower is a national park in the Gladstone Region, Queensland, Australia.

== Geography ==
The park is split across the south-eastern corner of the locality of Iveragh and the south-western corner of the locality of Foreshores, 407 kilometres (253 mi) northwest of Brisbane. The vegetation in the park is predominantly open eucalypt woodland. There are also some stands of hoop pine.

Mount Castle Tower can be seen from Lake Awoonga. The park has limited access with permission required from Gladstone Area Water Board to cross their property. There are no facilities for visitors or official trails. The elevation of the terrain is 313 metres above sea level. The highest peak in the park is Mount Stanley with 690.9 metres above sea level.

== See also ==
- Boyne Valley, Queensland
- Protected areas of Queensland
