= Iveragh, Queensland =

Iveragh
- Suburb
- Interactive map of Iveragh
- Coordinates: 24.1197°S 151.3780°E
- Country: Australia
- State: Queensland
- LGA: Gladstone Region
- Location: 17.9 km (11.1 mi) SSE of Tannum Sands; 35.7 km (22.2 mi) SSE of Gladstone CBD; 137 km (85 mi) SE of Rockhampton; 180 km (110 mi) NNW of Bundaberg; 496 km (308 mi) NNW of Brisbane

Government
  - State electorates: Callide; Burnett
  - Federal division: Flynn

Area
  - Total: 235.5 km^{2} (90.9 sq mi)

Population
  - Total: 122 (2021 census)
  - Density: 0.5180/km^{2} (1.342/sq mi)
- Time zone: UTC+10:00 (AEST)
- Postcode: 4680
Suburbs around Iveragh
Benaraby	Tannum Sands	Foreshores
Boynedale	Iveragh	Foreshores
Boynedale	Boynedale	Bororen

Iveragh is a rural locality in the Gladstone Region, Queensland, Australia. In the 2021 census, Iveragh had a population of 122 people.

== Geography ==
The Bruce Highway enters the locality from the east (Foreshores) and exits to the north (Tannum Sands).

The North Coast railway line enters the locality from the east (Foreshores) and exits to the north-west (Benaraby). The locality is served by:

- Rodds Bay railway station, now abandoned (24.0665°S 151.3870°E).
- Iveragh railway station (24.1248°S 151.4540°E).

Iveragh has the following mountains:

- Inkerman Peak (24.1564°S 151.3974°E) 215 metres (705 ft)
- Mercy Hill (24.0923°S 151.4217°E) 137 metres (449 ft)
- Mount Castletower (24.1667°S 151.2916°E) 542 metres (1,778 ft)
- Mount Coulston (24.1854°S 151.4433°E) 497 metres (1,631 ft)

== History ==
Iveragh State School opened in 1922 in a school building relocated from the Toolooa State School. It was on a 5-acre (2.0 ha) land parcel. The school closed in 1940.

== Demographics ==
In the 2016 census, Iveragh had a population of 140 people.

In the 2021 census, Iveragh had a population of 122 people.

== Education ==
There are no schools in Iveragh. The nearest government primary school is Benaraby State School in neighbouring Benaraby to the north-west. The nearest government secondary school is Tannum Sands State High School in neighbouring Tannum Sands to the north.
