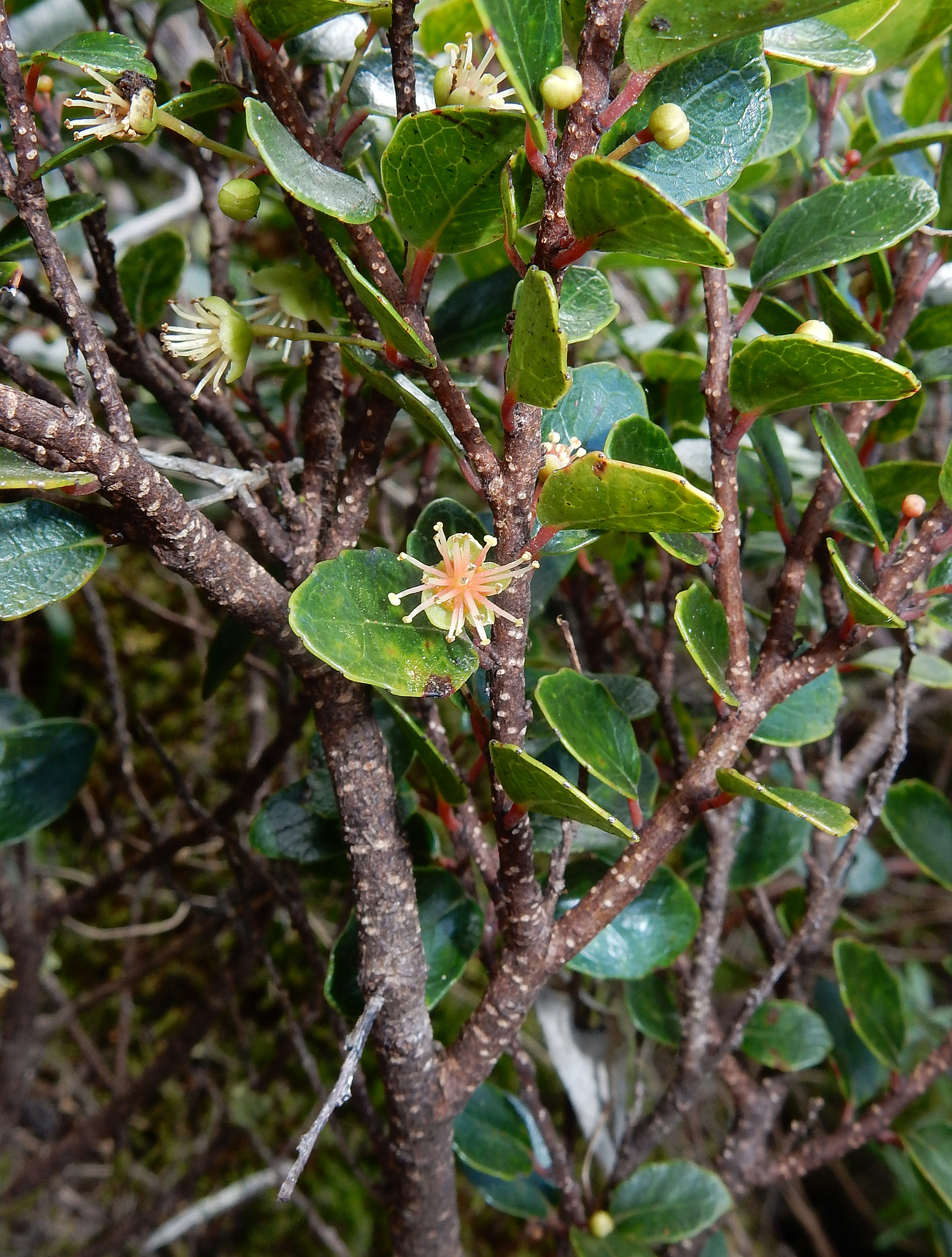
- In flower on Lord Howe Island

Conservation status
- Endangered (EPBC Act)
- Critically Endangered (NSWBCA)

Scientific classification
- Kingdom: Plantae
- Clade: Tracheophytes
- Clade: Angiosperms
- Clade: Eudicots
- Clade: Rosids
- Order: Malpighiales
- Family: Salicaceae
- Genus: Xylosma
- Species: X. parvifolia

Binomial name
- Xylosma parvifolia Jessup

Synonyms (Note: The synonymy of Xylosma parvifolia remains contested across different sources, with major orthographic errata and authorial discrepancies posing enduring confusion rooted in historical misattributions. A concerted effort will be made to ensure comprehensive coverage of all possible synonyms.)
- Xylosma ovata var. parvifolia Sleumer; Xylosma ovata var. parvifolia F.Muell. ex Sleumer; Xylosma ovatum var. parvifolium Sleumer; Xylosma ovatum var. parvifolium F.Muell. ex Sleumer; Xylosma parviflorum; Xylosma parvifolium Jessup

= Xylosma parvifolia =

Species of flowering plant

Xylosma parvifolia, generally known as mountain xylosma, is a species of flowering plant in the family Salicaceae. It is a shrub endemic to Lord Howe Island.

== Description ==
Xylosma parvifolia is a deciduous shrub or tree typically reaching 1–4 m (3 ft 3 in – 13 ft 1 in) in height. Branchlets are dark brown and sparsely hairy, marked by numerous pale, rounded lenticels. The rigid, chartaceous leaves are ovate to elliptic-obovate and glabrous apart from the midvein, measuring approximately 0.4–1.2 cm (0.16–0.47 in) in length and 0.4–0.8 cm (0.16–0.31 in) in width. Leaf margins are serrate or dentate, and each leaf possesses 2–4 pairs of secondary veins. Petioles are reddish brown, puberulous, and range from 2–3 mm (0.079–0.118 in) in length. Male flowers are solitary or borne in short axillary racemes that number 3–5, and terminate the rachis. Each has 5 glabrous sepals with entire margins and approximately 12–20 stamens, the glabrous filaments extending 2–5 mm (0.079–0.197 in). Female flowers are similar in arrangement and possess an ovoid-globose ovary about 2 mm (0.079 in) long with two short styles. Flowering occurs primarily from December to May. The fruit is a small, slightly fleshy, purple berry approximately 3–5 mm (0.12–0.20 in) long, typically containing two seeds. Compared to Xylosma ovata, it is distinguished by its more numerous stamens, longer filaments, nearly glabrous sepal margins, smaller and less toothed leaves, and fewer flowers per male inflorescence.

== Distribution ==
Xylosma parvifolia is endemic to Lord Howe Island, where it is distributed across the main island and the rocky islands surrounding it, with denser clusters at Mount Gower and Lidgbird.

== Ecology ==
Xylosma parvifolia is a plant of the wet tropical biome, and is a montane species confined to upper slopes, rocky cliffs, and major outcrops across elevations ranging from 150–700 m (490–2,300 ft). It favors exposed ridgelines and open cliff faces near summits, where canopy cover is minimal and vegetative competition is low. Its ecological associations span 367 documented species, primarily insects and fungi. Its reproductive biology remains poorly documented, and is presumed to engage in ornithophily, although there are no confirmed dispersal vectors. Despite its continued presence at known sites, Xylosma parvifolia has not colonized new areas for more than 20 years, suggesting pronounced habitat specialization and weak competitive ability.

== Taxonomy ==
Xylosma parvifolia was first described by Hermann Otto Sleumer in 1938 as Xylosma ovatum var. parvifolium, a name later standardized to Xylosma ovata var. parvifolia. In 1984, Laurence Woodward Jessup described Xylosma parvifolium, which used a different type specimen than the initial taxon, though it synonymized it. Later, the genus underwent a grammatical gender concordance, initiated by William T. Stearn in 1992 when he questioned the genus’s gender, and finalized by Dan Henry Nicolson in 1994, putting Xylosma parvifolia in agreement with the genus name. The collective number of synonyms across different sources is approximately 6.

Historically, Xylosma parvifolia was placed in Flacourtiaceae under older classification systems such as those of Cronquist and Takhtajan. Eventually, Flacourtiaceae, including this taxon, were reclassified into Salicaceae, a placement adopted by the APG III system and subsequently recognized by Plants of the World Online.

=== Etymology ===
Xylosma parvifolia goes by only one reported common name, that being mountain xylosma.

The genus name Xylosma derives from xylon (Ancient Greek: ξύλον), meaning "wood" or "tree," and osmé (Ancient Greek: ὀσμή), meaning "smell," overall referring to the aromatic wood found in some species. The species epithet, parvifolia, denotes the small leaf size, derived from the Latin parvus, meaning "small" or "little," and folia, meaning "leaf."

== Conservation status ==
Xylosma parvifolia is reportedly restricted to a single subpopulation of approximately 180–200 mature plants on Lord Howe Island. Its fragile distribution and limited AOO and EOO, each estimated at 8 km^{2} (5.0 mi^{2}), make it highly susceptible to extinction. Climate-induced habitat shifts, hydrological stress, and invasive weeds and animals all exacerbate the present issues. Although rodent control has reduced predation, it has inadvertently encouraged weed expansion, intensifying competition. Trampling by visitors, landslides, and the spread of Phytophthora cinnamomi further diminish suitable habitat. Habitat succession following feral goat removal has led to stable climax communities, decreasing disturbance-dependent niches. Its failure to colonize new sites underscores its ecological vulnerability. Conservation efforts include rat control, climate monitoring, ex-situ collections, and public engagement. Xylosma parvifolia is currently listed as Endangered under the Environment Protection and Biodiversity Conservation Act 1999 and Critically Endangered under the Biodiversity Conservation Act 2016.
