= Foreshores, Queensland =

Foreshores
- Suburb
- Interactive map of Foreshores
- Coordinates: 24.1083°S 151.5013°E
- Country: Australia
- State: Queensland
- LGA: Gladstone Region
- Location: 33.3 km (20.7 mi) N of Miriam Vale; 38.5 km (23.9 mi) SE of Tannum Sands; 56.0 km (34.8 mi) SE of Gladstone; 496 km (308 mi) NNW of Brisbane

Government
  - State electorate: Burnett
  - Federal division: Flynn

Area
  - Total: 236.8 km^{2} (91.4 sq mi)

Population
  - Total: 142 (2021 census)
  - Density: 0.5997/km^{2} (1.553/sq mi)
- Time zone: UTC+10:00 (AEST)
- Postcode: 4678
Suburbs around Foreshores
Tannum Sands	Coral Sea	Eurimbula
Iveragh	Foreshores	Rodds Bay
Iveragh	Bororen	Rodds Bay

Foreshores is a coastal rural locality in the Gladstone Region, Queensland, Australia. The area is used for farming with some rural residential development. In the 2021 census, Foreshores had a population of 142 people.

== Geography ==
The locality is bounded to the north by the Coral Sea. It includes both a mainland component to the south and Hummock Hill Island to the north (24.0176°S 151.4847°E), which are separated by the Colosseum Inlet (24.02°S 151.4383°E). There are wetlands on both sides of the inlet. The crossing between the mainland and the island is sufficiently shallow that sheep can cross at low tide.

Hummock Hill Island is 9 square miles (23 km^{2}). As the name suggests, the island's main feature is Hummock Hill (24.0129°S 151.4751°E), rising 124 metres (407 ft) above sea level.

The Bruce Highway and the North Coast railway line pass through the south-western part of the locality from Bororen to Iveragh.

All parts of the sea within the locality are within the Great Barrier Reef Coast Marine Park. The south-western corner of the locality is within the Castle Tower National Park.

The land along Intrepid Drive is used rural residential purposes. Otherwise the predominant land use is grazing on native vegetation with a small area of plantation timber. As at 2025, there is no land use on Hummock Island.

== History ==
The origin of the locality is not recorded, but presumably relate to its coastal location.

In March 1880, there was a sale of pastoral leases on Hummock Hill Island, which sold for £9 per square mile, £7 over the upset price.

In 1916, Thomas Farmer was successfully raising sheep on the island.

In 1921, John James Athelstane Murray (1859-1936), son of John Murray, purchased Hummock Hill Island and lived there until his death in 1936.

== Demographics ==
In the 2016 census, Foreshores had a population of 135 people.

In the 2021 census, Foreshores had a population of 142 people.

== Education ==
There are no schools in Foreshores. The nearest government primary schools are in Bororen State School in neighbouring Bororen to the south and Benaraby State School in Benaraby to the west. The nearest government secondary school is Tannum Sands State High School in Tannum Sands to the north-west.

== Proposed development ==
In 2019, the Queensland Government conditionally approved a residential and tourist development on Hummock Hill Island. The development will consist of 2,500 residences with 770 of them intended for permanent housing, along with an airstrip, shops and a golf course and is expected to cost $1.2 billion. It includes a bridge from the mainland to the island. The Gladstone Regional Council has opposed the development.
