= Boyne Smelters =

Australian metals company

Coordinates: 23°55′45″S 151°20′24″E

Boyne Smelters Limited
- Formerly: Gladstone Aluminium
- Type: Limited company
- Industry: Aluminium
- Founded: 1982
- Headquarters: Boyne Island, Queensland, Australia
- Key people: Joe Rea (General Manager)
- Products: Aluminium
- Production output: 545,000 tonnes
- Number of employees: 921
- Parent: Rio Tinto (73.50%); YKK Aluminium (9.50%); UACJ Corporation (9.29%); Southern Cross Aluminium (7.71%)
- Website: boynesmelters.com.au

Boyne Smelters is located on Boyne Island, Queensland, Australia, approximately 12 km south of the port of Gladstone. The smelter has a production capacity of 545,000 tonnes of aluminium per year.

The operating company Boyne Smelters Ltd is majority owned by Rio Tinto (73.50%) with the balance held by a consortium of Japanese participants including YKK Aluminium (9.50%), UACJ Corporation (9.29%) and Southern Cross Aluminium (a joint venture between Sumitomo and Marubeni) (7.71%).

== History ==
Construction of the smelter commenced in 1979 and the plant was officially opened in 1982. The concept of an aluminium industry in the state of Queensland, Australia began in 1957 when the Queensland Government and Comalco's predecessor signed an agreement giving the company the right to develop a large bauxite deposit discovered two years earlier at Weipa on the remote far North West coast of Cape York Peninsula by the company.

The agreement required Comalco to accept a number of obligations, including establishing a plant in Queensland to refine bauxite to alumina and to investigate building an aluminium smelter to smelt alumina to aluminium. The first obligation was fulfilled in 1967 when a consortium by the company commenced operation of the Queensland Alumina's Gladstone refinery.

The economics of establishing a smelter improved dramatically after the discovery within Queensland of a number of new coal fields in the Bowen basin. In 1972 Comalco entered into further agreements with the State giving the company the right to opt for blocks of power from a new powerstation to be built at Gladstone. Partly funded by the Federal Government on the condition that a portion of the power would be used for export industry. In 1974 Comalco began detailed investigations into a site for an Aluminium smelter in the Gladstone area. The power agreement defined a radius from the powerstation for the establishment of the plant. A local office was established in Gladstone to conduct site selection, environmental studies and infrastructure requirements.

In 1975 the company opted for the first block of power. At the time the world aluminium industry was in recession. In August 1977 Comalco had obtained Federal Government, Queensland Government and Calliope Shire environmental approvals and began clearing and preliminary earthworks on the 50 Ha Boyne Island smelter site. It was not until 1978 that conditions improved sufficiently for Comalco to commit in principle to the establishment of the Boyne Island aluminium smelter. In August 1979 Comalco formed the consortium company to establish the smelter.

Initially the consortium comprised American and Japanese participants along with Comalco, an Australian company. All participants entered the project through an Australian subsidiary, Gladstone Aluminium, and were obliged to take the whole of the production of the smelter in proportion to their shareholding. Comalco managed the construction and ongoing operation of the plant. In 1981 Gladstone Aluminium was renamed Boyne Smelter.

The first aluminium was produced in February 1982 on schedule and within budget. Potline 2 start-up was July 1983 and the smelter officially opened after that.

== Construction ==
In 1974 along with establishment of its local office, field studies began and extensive discussions and negotiations were held with both Local and State Governments and departments. It was therefore possible to define the public facilities needed associated with a Boyne Island smelter site. As a result, a new community at Boyne Island / Tannum Sands was proposed. Comalco staff was actively involved in planning services for the new community and much of this was commenced before construction of the smelter itself began in earnest. By the time construction on the smelter site began, housing subdivisions were proceeding with new housing, (eventually nearly 500 homes) access roads, new bridges onto Boyne Island and another built to Tannum Sands, joining the two previous villages, water sewerage, power supplies and phones constructed. Caravan parks and quarters surrounding a new recreation club with sporting facilities initially for the construction workers but eventually for community use were completed. Nearly $40 million was spent by the company on community facilities.

Reduction of the lead time activities was crucial in getting the project off to a successful start. With the foregoing arrangements Comalco were able to achieve a start on its project some 18 months ahead of competitors with similar plans.

A 'fast track' approach was used for the main plant with simultaneous design and construction with multiple contractors. Although carrying out the technology selection and plant criteria development the company did not have staff to fully carry out detail design and contract supervision, so CCL decided on an arrangement where it retained project management responsibility and sought the services of a widely recognised engineer constructor. International inquiries were called and appointment of IBI made in June 1979, construction commenced on the plant in October 1979. The organisational arrangement was three tiered; CCL as owner's representative and project managers, the engineer / constructor as agent to CCL and individual contractors and suppliers, all contracts were with CCL.

Over 3700 drawings were prepared, a design staff peak of 150 engineers and draftsmen (at a time before computer aided drawing) with a field staff of 140 engineers and supervisors. 180 installation contracts were let with a peak workforce of 1400 on site in 1981.

The potline buildings were considered the longest buildings in Australia at nearly a kilometre in length and requiring for each potline 7,300 tonnes of steel, 32,000 cubic meters of concrete and 75,000sq meters of roofing and siding, with 7500 tonnes of aluminium busbar each. First concrete was placed in March 1980, and first steel in June 1980. In November 1981 the site was connected to electricity at 132 kV. For the initial smelter there were 1,500,000 cu m of earthworks, 116,000 cu m of concrete, 20,000 tonnes of steel, 250,000 sq m of sheeting, 1,000 electric motors, 560 km of cables, 50 km of piping and 60 km of cable racking.

The CCL project team placed emphasis on local participation and opportunity for local engineers. Of the capital cost 77% was spent in Australia, 33% in Queensland and 19% in Gladstone.

As a green fields site the plant was designed for ease of expansion for an ultimate four potline configuration. Line 3 was constructed between 1994 and 1997.

== Technology ==
The smelter comprises:

- two potlines of 240 Sumitomo S-170 reduction cells commissioned in 1982;
- one potline of 264 Pechiney AP-30 cells commissioned in 1997; and
- a test group of 5 Comalco B32 cells commissioned in 2002.

In 2025, 1,000 people work at the smelter. Around 3,000 people work in Rio Tinto's Gladstone operations (Boyne smelter and Yarwun alumina refinery) combined. Rio Tinto signed a 15-year power supply deal from 600 MW solar power (with DC-coupled 600 MW / 2,400 MWh batteries) in Smoky Creek and Guthrie’s Gap, reducing cost for some of the power for those factories.
