= Wild Cattle Island National Park =

National park in Queensland, Australia

- IUCN category II (national park)
- Location within Queensland
- Location: Queensland
- Nearest city: Tannum Sands
- Coordinates: 23°57′30″S 151°23′04″E
- Area: 5.8 km^{2} (2.2 sq mi)
- Established: 1992
- Governing body: Queensland Parks and Wildlife Service

Wild Cattle Island is a national park in Queensland, Australia, approximately 25 km southeast of Gladstone.

== See also ==
- Protected areas of Queensland
