= Tannum Sands, Queensland =

Tannum Sands
- Town
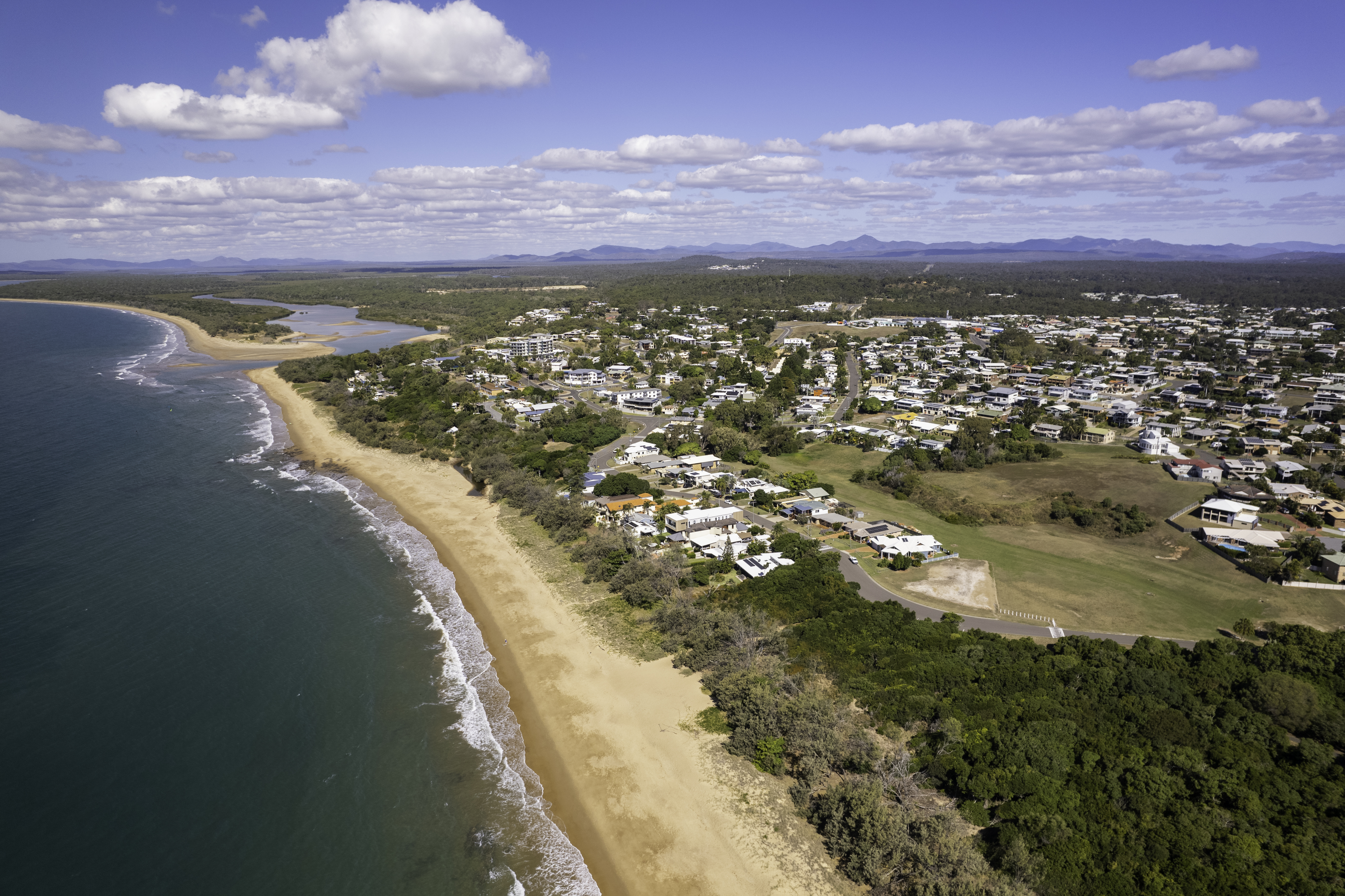
- Tannum Sands from the air – May 2023

- Interactive map of Tannum Sands
- Coordinates: 23.9474°S 151.3675°E
- Country: Australia
- State: Queensland
- LGA: Gladstone Region
- Location: 1.1 km (0.68 mi) E of Boyne Island; 25.1 km (15.6 mi) SE of Gladstone CBD; 133 km (83 mi) SE of Rockhampton; 517 km (321 mi) NNW of Brisbane

Government
  - State electorate: Gladstone
  - Federal division: Flynn

Area
  - Total: 84.3 km^{2} (32.5 sq mi)

Population
  - Total: 5,227 (2021 census)
  - Density: 62.00/km^{2} (160.59/sq mi)
- Time zone: UTC+10:00 (AEST)
- Postcode: 4680
Localities around Tannum Sands
Boyne Island	Coral Sea	Coral Sea
Wurdong Heights	Tannum Sands	Coral Sea
Benaraby	Iveragh	Foreshores

Tannum Sands is a coastal town and locality in the Gladstone Region, Queensland, Australia. In the 2021 census, the locality of Tannum Sands had a population of 5,227 people.

== Geography ==
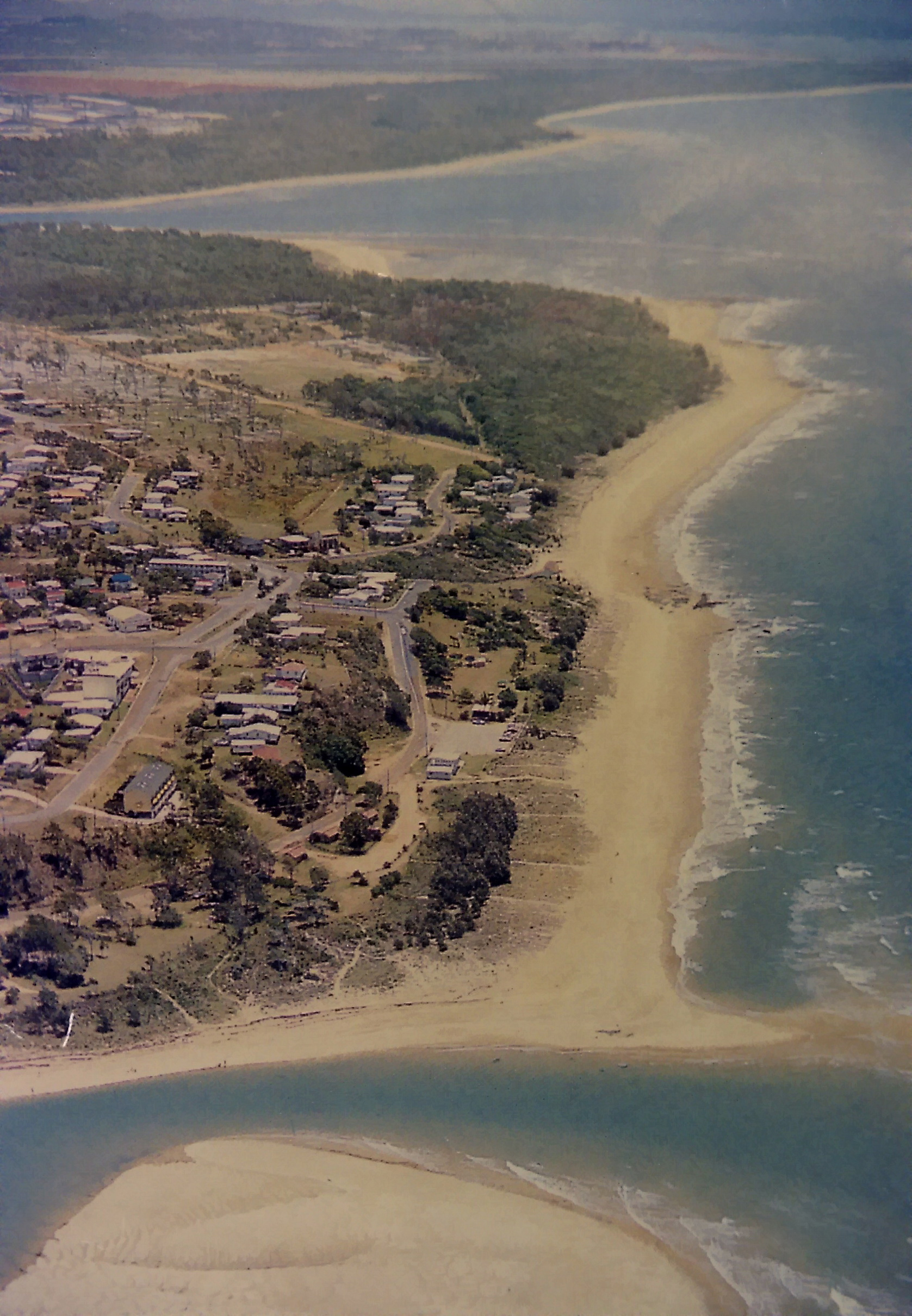
Aerial view of Tannum Sands, 2012

The locality is bounded to north-east by the Coral Sea, to the north-west and west by the Boyne River, and to the south-west by Station Creek. The town of Tannum Sands is located in the northern part of the locality.

Canoe Point is at the northern tip of the locality (23.9375°S 151.3660°E).

The locality includes Wild Cattle Island (23.9842°S 151.4120°E) which is separated from the mainland east coast by a narrow channel known as Wild Cattle Creek. The island's east coast facing the Coral Sea is a long sandy strip called Wild Cattle Beach (23.97000°S 151.40917°E). Most of the island is within the Wild Cattle Island National Park with the small town of Bangalee at its southern tip (24.0052°S 151.4319°E).

Tannum Sands has a neighbouring twin town called Boyne Island. The two localities are separated only by the Boyne River and joined by a bridge.

Tannum Sands is primarily a tourist and residential town. It is a major residential area for the nearby Boyne Island Aluminium Smelter and Gladstone-based industries.

== History ==
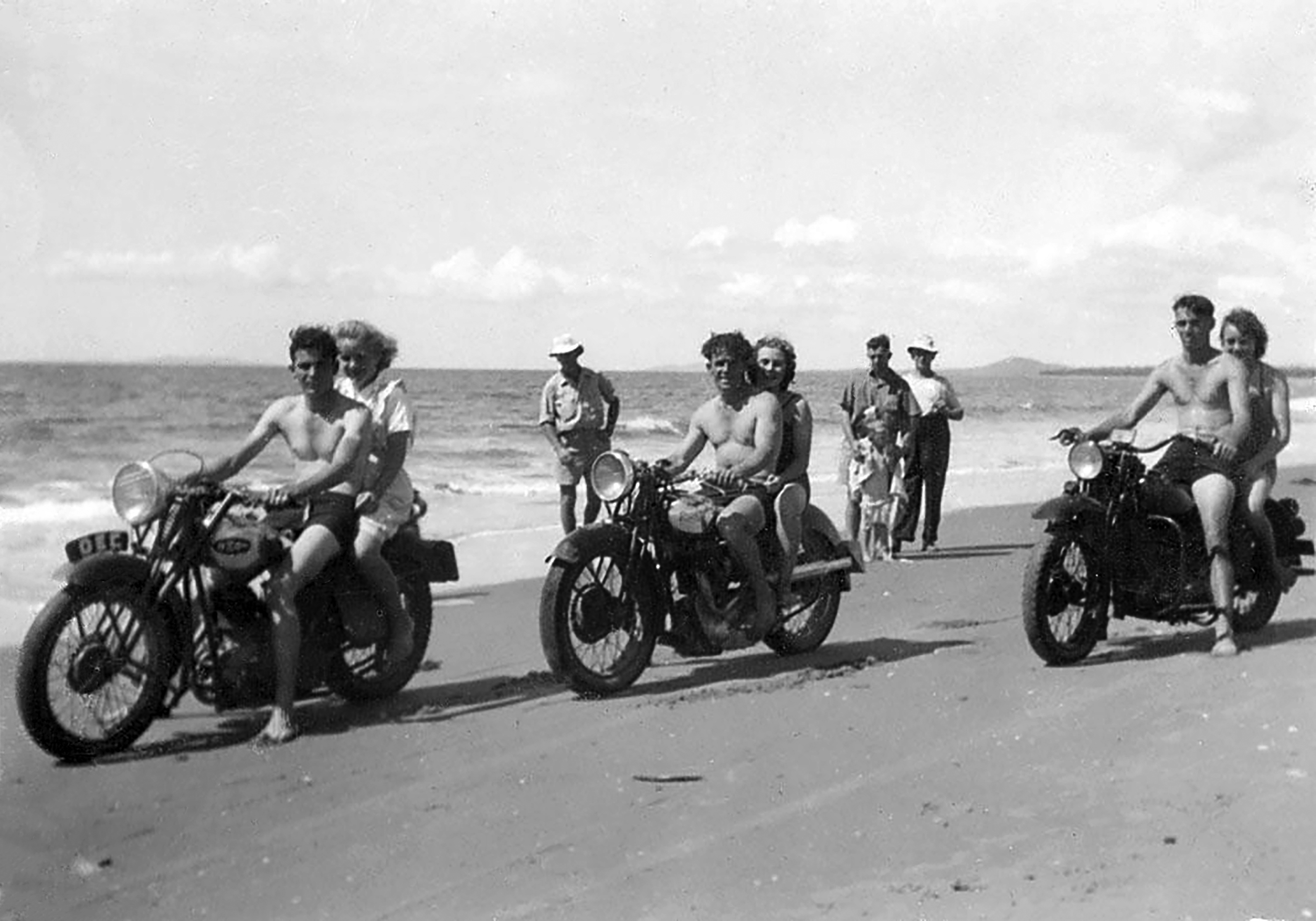
Motor bikes on Tannum Beach in sports organised by the Tannum Progress Association, June 1947

The area south of the Boyne River was originally known as Redcliff (being the colour of the stoney cliffs) and then renamed Wild Cattle Creek (being the name of the creek that flows through the area) and had been a popular fishing and picnic location for the people of Boyne Island, but remained unsettled due to its inaccessibility. Closer settlement began in the late 1930s when 12 beach front lots were auctioned. The town received its original name Tannum when a group of children returned from a Sunday School picnic to the beach quite sunburnt. The comment was made "we can really tan 'um over there." One of the people present worked for the Queensland Land Department thought it would be a good name for the area and registered the name.

The Tannum Progress Association held sports days. Over 1000 people attended on New Year's Day in 1949.

On 12 April 1951, the town was renamed Tannum Sands.

A bridge connecting Tannum Sands to Boyne Island was constructed as a result of the construction of the Boyne Island Aluminium Smelter. It was opened on 11 October 1980 by E.A.D. Cameron, Chairman of the Calliope Shire Council.

Tannum Sands Uniting Church was built in 1980.

Tannum Sands State School was opened on 24 January 1983.

The Boyne Tannum Hookup fishing competition began on 7 June 1996 and has run annually ever since.

Tannum Sands State High School was opened on 22 January 1998 with 287 students in Years 7 and 8.

St Peter Chanel Catholic Church was built in 2006.

St Francis Catholic Primary School was opened in January 2005.

Clearview Christian College opened in 2023, offering Years 7 and 8 initially.

== Demographics ==
Population of Tannum Sands according to census data.

Year	Population	Notes
1966 census	290	
1976 census	565	
1986 census	1798	
1991 census	2460	
2001 census	3363	
2006 census	4139	
2011 census	5254	
2016 census	5145	
2021 census	5227	

== Education ==
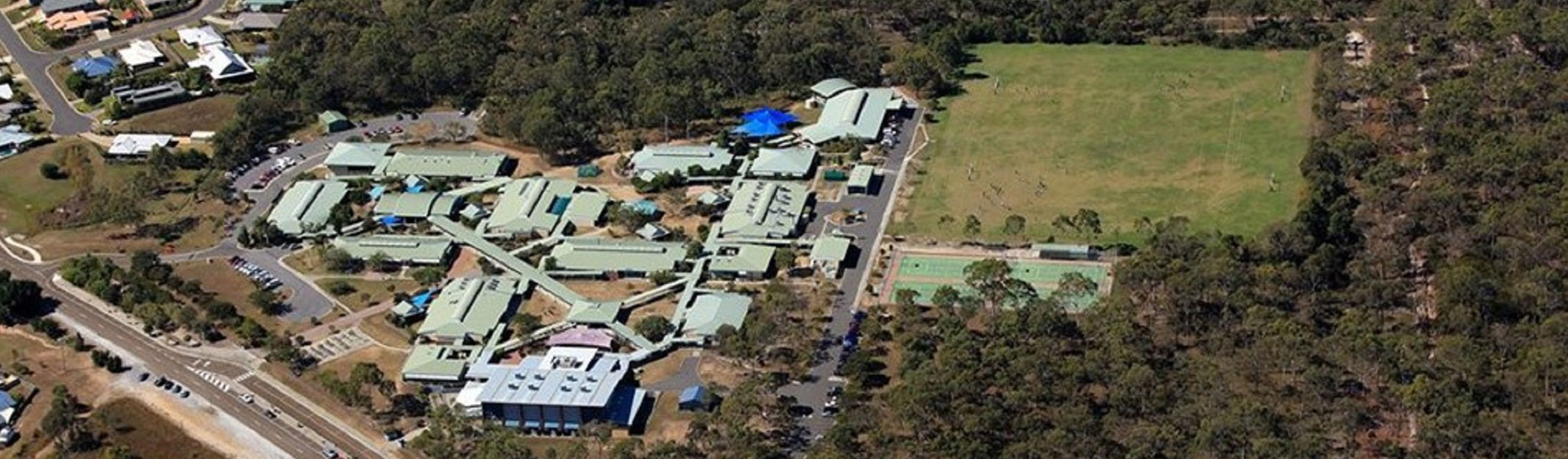
Aerial view of Tannum Sands State High School, 2022

Tannum Sands State School is a government primary (Prep–6) school for boys and girls at 22 Waratah Crescent (23.9509°S 151.3648°E). In 2017, the school had an enrolment of 736 students with 49 teachers (45 full-time equivalent) and 27 non-teaching staff (18 full-time equivalent). In 2018, the school had an enrolment of 693 students with 52 teachers (46 full-time equivalent) and 35 non-teaching staff (23 full-time equivalent). It includes a special education program.

St Francis Catholic Primary School is a Catholic primary (Prep–6) school for boys and girls at 1 Francis Way (23.9431°S 151.3609°E). In 2017, the school had an enrolment of 231 students with 21 teachers (17 full-time equivalent) and 15 non-teaching staff (8 full-time equivalent). In 2018, the school had an enrolment of 205 students with 21 teachers (16 full-time equivalent) and 14 non-teaching staff (6 full-time equivalent).

Tannum Sands State High School is a government secondary (7–12) school for boys and girls at 65 Coronation Drive (23.9596°S 151.3643°E). In 2017, the school had an enrolment of 1,066 students with 86 teachers (82 full-time equivalent) and 44 non-teaching staff (31 full-time equivalent). In 2018, the school had an enrolment of 986 students with 87 teachers (81 full-time equivalent) and 44 non-teaching staff (31 full-time equivalent). It includes a special education program.

Clearview Christian College is a private secondary school (Years 7–12) for boys and girls at 1 Canoe Point Road (23.9401°S 151.3662°E). As at 2025, it offers Years 7 to 10, but, by 2027, will offer Years 7 to 12. In its first year of operation (2023), the school had an enrolment of 33 students in Years 7 and 8.

== Amenities ==
The Tannum Sands branch of the Queensland Country Women's Association meets at the QCWA Hall at 1 Steele Street.

Tannum Sands Uniting Church is at 12 Silverton Drive (23.972787°S 151.366°E). It is within the Presbytery of Central Queensland and the Synod of Queensland.

St Peter Chanel Catholic Church is in Francis Way (23.943318°S 151.361°E). It is within the Roman Catholic Diocese of Rockhampton.

Tannum Sands has a beach patrolled by surf lifesavers.

There are two boat ramps in the locality, both managed by the Gladstone Regional Council:

- Wild Cattle Creek Road boat ramp on the southern bank of Wild Cattle Creek (23.9587°S 151.3829°E)
- Tiller Street boat ramp at Ibis Park on the western bank of the Boyne River (23.9558°S 151.3614°E)

== Sport ==
Boyne-Tannum has teams competing in soccer, rugby league, Australian rules football, cricket, touch football, netball, tennis, surf lifesaving, swimming, and hockey. The area has two sporting grounds: BITS (Boyne Island Tannum Sands) club for cricket, football, golf, soccer, and lawn bowls, and Dennis Park for touch football, netball, and rugby league. Within Tannum Sands itself is the Tannum Sands Tennis Association and the Tannum Sands Squash Centre. The latter also provides rock climbing and a gymnasium.

The local rugby league team are the Tannum Sands Seagulls, who compete in the Gladstone District Rugby League competition.

Kiteboarding is a rapidly growing sport in the region, with Tannum Sands becoming a nationally renowned location.

Tannum Sands also has a growing number of horse riders racing along the beach.

== Events ==
Boyne Island and Tannum Sands are also home to the Boyne Tannum Hookup, Australia's largest family fishing event held on the King's Birthday long weekend. The event is held at Bray Park. This event is very popular with more than 3,000 entrants.

The Coconet Classic is an annual kiteboarding event. It was formerly the National Kiteboarding Titles, but became an open event held during the Easter long weekend.

Tannum Sands is well known as a fishing venue with access to the Great Barrier Reef, the Boyne River and Lake Awoonga.

== Hazards ==
Saltwater crocodiles have been sighted on Wild Cattle Island and in Wild Cattle Creek.
