= Boyne River (Central Queensland) =

Boyne
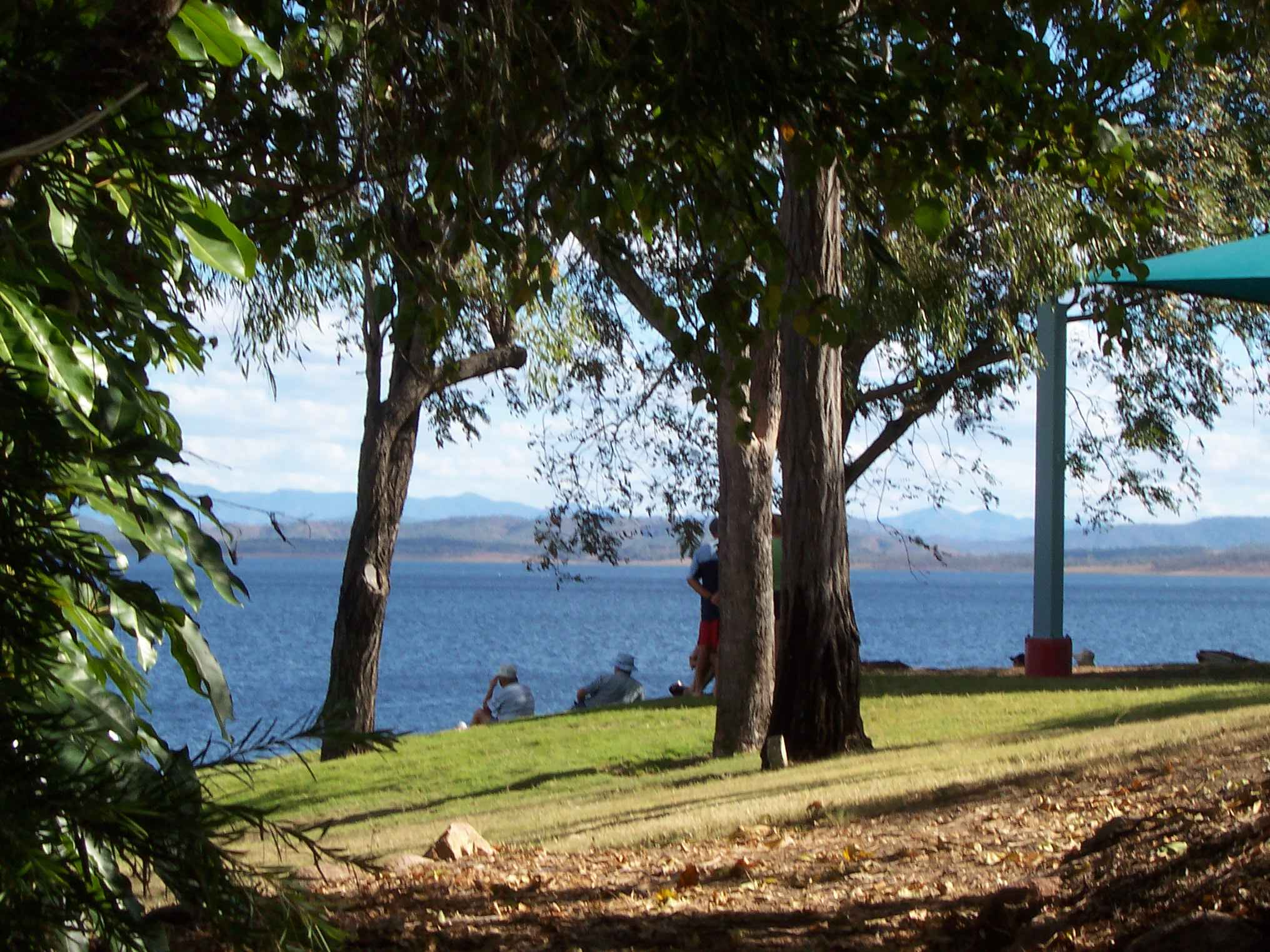

- Location of Boyne River mouth in Queensland
- Etymology: River Boyne

Location
- Country: Australia
- State: Queensland
- Region: Central Queensland

Physical characteristics
- Source: Bobby Range
  - location: southwest of Miriam Vale
  - coordinates: 24°30′14″S 151°29′21″E
  - elevation: 371 m (1,217 ft)
- Mouth: Coral Sea
  - location: between Boyne Island and Tannum Sands
  - coordinates: 23°55′49″S 151°21′34″E
  - elevation: 0 m (0 ft)
- Length: 125 km (78 mi)
- Basin size: 2,496 km^{2} (964 sq mi)
- Discharge
  - location: Near mouth
  - average: 8.8 m^{3}/s (280 GL/a)

Basin features
- Reservoir: Lake Awoonga

The Boyne River is a river in Central Queensland, Australia.

== Overview ==
The headwaters of the river rise in the Bobby Range, within the Great Dividing Range southwest of Miriam Vale. The river descends from the western slopes of the range and flows generally north by east parallel with the Gladstone-Monto Road through the Boyne Valley. At Benaraby, the river is impounded by the Awoonga Dam to form Lake Awoonga, and then flows east by north, crossed by the Bruce Highway near Riverview, and finally discharging into the Port Curtis and the Coral Sea. The river descends 371 metres (1,217 ft) over its 125-kilometre (78 mi) course, joined by thirteen tributaries from source to river mouth. The mouth is located between the twin towns of Boyne Island and Tannum Sands. A bridge was built to cross the river joining the two towns in 1980.

The river is dammed by the Awoonga Dam which is the major water source for the Gladstone region. The river has a catchment area of 2,496 square kilometres (964 sq mi) of which 49 square kilometres (19 sq mi) are riverine wetlands and 17 square kilometres (7 sq mi) are estuarine wetlands.

The Queensland Department of Environment and Heritage Protection consider the Boyne River to be the southern habitat extent of the saltwater crocodile. However, crocodiles can occasionally be found as far south as the Mary River.

The river was named in 1823 by John Oxley as it reminded him of the River Boyne in Ireland.

== See also ==
- List of rivers of Australia § Queensland
