= Tannum Sands State High School =

Location
- Tannum Sands, Queensland; Australia; 23.960459°S 151.364946°E

Information
- Type: Secondary public school
- Motto: Creating Our Futures
- Established: 1998
- Principal: Heather Moller (2016–current)

Tannum Sands State High School (TSSHS or often Tannum High) is a public high school located in Tannum Sands, Gladstone Region, Queensland, Australia. Each grade has an average of about 213 students. It is the first secondary school established in the Tannum Sands area. The school receives approximately 95% of the students living in the Tannum Sands catchment area for Year 7 each year.

== History ==
Tannum Sands State High School opened in 1998 with 287 Grade 8 and 9 students. Their first seniors graduated in 2001.

== Principals and deputy principals ==
The following principals and deputy principals have led the school since it was opened:

- Ray Johnston; 1998–2016
- Kevin Giles; unspecified–2009
- John Adie; unspecified–2011
- Rohan Brooks; unspecified–2013
- Heather Moller; 2009–current
- Katrina Baylden; 2011–unspecified
- Tarah Vardy; unspecified–current
- Patrica Vicary; 2017–current
- Nicole Gray; 2023–current

== Extracurricular and co-curricular activities ==
=== Indigenous education ===
Tannum Sands State High School is a member of the Australia-wide "Dare to Lead" project, aimed at improving educational outcomes for indigenous students. The school's Indigenous Support Team works on building relationships to engage indigenous community members, tertiary institutions and all school personnel, as well as partnering with Indigenous Role Models and mentors to support students in achieving their goals.

=== Sport ===
A range of sporting activities are offered by Tannum High, including skateboarding, dance, ultimate disk, yoga, fishing, soccer, touch football, cricket, basketball, netball, volleyball, bocce and seven-a-side league. Swimming, Athletics, Cross-Country and Beach carnivals are also conducted annually.

The school also competes in interschool team competitions after school against other schools in Gladstone, in sports such as rugby league, netball, volleyball, touch football, soccer and hockey. Students also have the opportunity to nominate for Port Curtis trials in a range of sports.

=== Extracurricular activities ===
A range of extracurricular activities is offered:

- Instrumental Music (Band and String Orchestra)
- Interschool Sport e.g. rugby league, soccer and netball
- Optiminds
- Student Council Committees
- Sport Carnivals
- National Competitions e.g. Australian Mathematics Competition
- Door knocks and other fundraisers for charity
- Port Curtis and Capricornia Region sport trials
- Chaplain's Bike-a-Thon ride to Rockhampton
- Lunchtime tutoring
- Camps and excursions
- NAIDOC week
- Debating and public speaking
- Christian Support Group ("YCATS")
- Tour de Chaplain 100 km charity bike ride
- School Prayer Group
- Human Powered Vehicle (HPV) race in Maryborough
