= Gladstone–Benaraby Road =

Road in Queensland, Australia

Gladstone–Benaraby Road Queensland

General information
- Type: Rural road
- Length: 19.4 km (12 mi)
- Route number(s): No shield (West Gladstone – South Gladstone); State Route 58 (South Gladstone – Benaraby)

Major junctions
- North end: Dawson Highway West Gladstone
- Glenlyon Road; French Street; Kirkwood Road; Boyne Island Road
- South end: Bruce Highway Benaraby

Location(s)
- Major settlements: South Gladstone, Glen Eden

Gladstone–Benaraby Road is a continuous 19.4 kilometres (12.1 mi) road route in the Gladstone region of Queensland, Australia. Much of the route is signed as State Route 58. Gladstone–Benaraby Road (number 185) is a state-controlled regional road. As part of State Route 58 it provides an alternate route between Benaraby and Mount Larcom. It is also part of the shortest route from Gladstone to the south of the state.

== Route Description ==
The Gladstone–Benaraby Road commences as Philip Street at an intersection with the Dawson Highway in West Gladstone. It runs east to an intersection with Glenlyon Road in South Gladstone, where it is joined by State Route 58. It continues east to an intersection with French Street, where it turns south as Gladstone–Benaraby Road.

The road runs south through or past the localities of Toolooa, Glen Eden, South Trees, O'Connell, Boyne Island, and Wurdong Heights before meeting the Bruce Highway in Benaraby. Land uses along this road include residential, industrial and rural, including some areas of native vegetation.

== State Route 58 ==
State Route 58 follows a number of separately named roads from Benaraby to Gladstone, and from Gladstone to Mount Larcom. It is a slightly longer alternative to the Bruce Highway. It leaves the Bruce Highway at Benaraby and follows the Gladstone–Benaraby Road north. In South Gladstone it turns west on Philip Street and then north on Glenlyon Road, which soon becomes Glenlyon Street. It passes the north-eastern end of the Dawson Highway in Gladstone Central and then turns west as Hanson Road. This runs generally west until it reaches Yarwun, where it changes to Gladstone–Mount Larcom Road, which continues south-west, west, and north-west until it reaches the Bruce Highway at Mount Larcom.

== Road condition ==
Gladstone–Benaraby Road is fully sealed. It has a distance of about 660 metres (720 yd) with an incline greater than 5%.

== History ==
The area where Gladstone now stands was the site of a short-lived convict settlement in 1847. In 1853 a new town was surveyed, and the next year a government agent was appointed, resulting in an influx of free settlers as land became available throughout the region. The first school opened in 1861, and the town became a Municipality in 1863. Development was slow until 1893 when a meatworks was established. The railway line arrived in 1897.

In January 1854, the New South Wales government proclaimed two new districts: Port Curtis (based on Gladstone) and Leichhardt (later renamed Fitzroy, based on Rockhampton). This released vast amounts of good grazing land for selection. Pastoral runs were soon taken up in these areas, leading to the cutting of tracks suitable for wheeled vehicles from the commercial centres to the properties. One such track was the forerunner of the Gladstone-Benaraby Road, while others formed the basis of what eventually became the Bruce Highway.

Benaraby was an area of small farms in the 1880s, with the first school opening in 1886. Further south, Miriam Vale had a post office from 1877. Its population increased in the 1890s with the growth of a thriving timber industry, and the first school opened in 1897. Prior to the arrival of the railway in 1897 these and other localities were dependent on a reliable road connection to Gladstone for their commercial success.

== Upgrades ==
A project to construct additional lanes in Philip Street, Gladstone, at a cost of $20 million, was completed in August 2021.

== Major intersections ==
All distances are from Google Maps. The entire road is in the Gladstone local government area.

Location	km	mi	Destinations	Notes
West Gladstone / Kin Kora midpoint	0	0.0	Dawson Highway – northeast – Gladstone Central – southwest – Clinton, Calliope	Northern end of Gladstone–Benaraby Road (no shield). Road initially runs east as Philip Street.
South Gladstone / Sun Valley midpoint	2.2	1.4	Glenlyon Road – north – Gladstone Central; Glenlyon Road (no shield) – south – Toolooa, Glen Eden	Road continues east as State Route 58.
South Gladstone	3.4	2.1	French Street – north – Barney Point	Road turns south as Gladstone–Benaraby Road (State Route 58)
South Trees	8.6	5.3	Kirkwood Road – west – Kirkwood	Road continues south
Wurdong Heights / Boyne Island midpoint	16.0	9.9	Boyne Island Road – east – Boyne Island	Road continues south
Wurdong Heights / Benaraby midpoint	19.4	12.1	Bruce Highway – west – Calliope – southeast – Iveragh, Miriam Vale	Southern end of Gladstone–Benaraby Road (State Route 58).
1.000 mi = 1.609 km; 1.000 km = 0.621 mi

== See also ==
- List of road routes in Queensland
- List of numbered roads in Queensland
