= Toolooa =

- Suburb
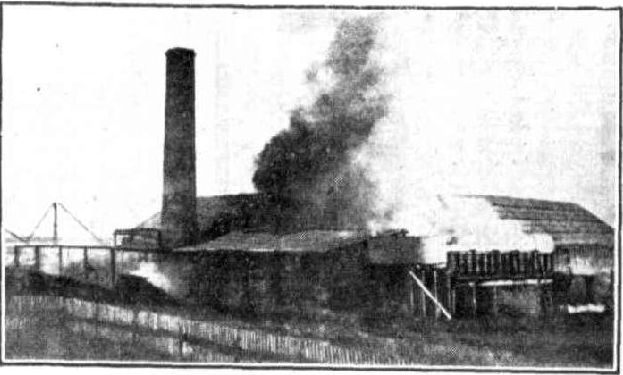
- Fire burns down Skyring's Mill, 1930

- Interactive map of Toolooa
- Coordinates: 23.8822°S 151.2694°E
- Country: Australia
- State: Queensland
- City: Gladstone
- LGA: Gladstone Region
- Location: 5.8 km (3.6 mi) SSE of Gladstone CBD; 113 km (70 mi) SE of Rockhampton; 512 km (318 mi) NNW of Brisbane

Government
  - State electorate: Gladstone
  - Federal division: Flynn

Area
  - Total: 3.0 km^{2} (1.2 sq mi)

Population
  - Total: 992 (2021 census)
  - Density: 331/km^{2} (856/sq mi)
- Time zone: UTC+10:00 (AEST)
- Postcode: 4680
Suburbs around Toolooa
| Sun Valley | South Gladstone | South Trees |
| Telina | Toolooa | South Trees |
| Glen Eden | Glen Eden | South Trees |

Toolooa is a suburb of Gladstone in the Gladstone Region, Queensland, Australia. In the 2021 census, Toolooa had a population of 992 people.

== Geography ==
Toolooa is 5.8 kilometres (3.6 mi) south of Gladstone Central by road. Toolooa borders Telina, South Gladstone, and Glen Eden and is close to The Botanical Gardens.

The suburb is bounded to the west by Glenlyon Road and to the north and east by the Moura railway line. Moura Short Line Junction railway station in the north-east of the locality is the interconnection of the Moura line with the North Coast railway line (23.8758°S 151.2738°E).

Gladstone–Benaraby Road passes through the eastern part of the suburb.

== History ==
The name Toolooa is believed to be derived from the Aboriginal name in the Gurang/Goeng language for nearby Barney Point and the clan of Indigenous Australians who lived in the area. When the first Government Resident Maurice Charles O'Connell came to Gladstone (then known as Port Curtis), he had a house built in 1856 called Toolooa House at Barney Point. This house was sold on 12 September 1863 and burned down on 15 August 1873. The name Toolooa was later used for a railway station 7 miles (11 km) south of Gladstone, but this station no longer exists.

In 1900 the Bundaberg firm Messrs H. A. Skyring and Sons established a large sawmill in the area near the railway line. It employed many workers and contributed to Gladstone's growth. The mill was completely destroyed by fire on 4 April 1930.

Skyring's Siding Provisional School opened about 2 May 1905 but was soon renamed Toolooa Provisional School. It became Toolooa State School on 1 January 1909 but closed on 30 April 1921. The school building was relocated to Iveragh to establish Iveragh State School in 1922.

Toolooa State High School opened on 27 January 1981 with 200 Year-8 students and 11 teachers.

== Demographics ==
In the 2011 census, Toolooa had a population of 1,164 people.

In the 2016 census, Toolooa had a population of 944 people.

In the 2021 census, Toolooa had a population of 992 people.

== Education ==
There are no schools in Toolooa. The nearest government primary schools are Gladstone South State School in neighbouring South Gladstone to the north and Kin Kora State School in Kin Kora to the west. Despite the name, Toolooa State High School is in neighbouring South Gladstone.

== Amenities ==
There are a number of parks in the area:

- Emperor Road Park (23.8827°S 151.2727°E)
- Toolooa Park (23.8850°S 151.2675°E)
- Toondoon Botanic Gardens (23.8922°S 151.2632°E)
