= O'Connell, Queensland =

O'Connell
- Suburb
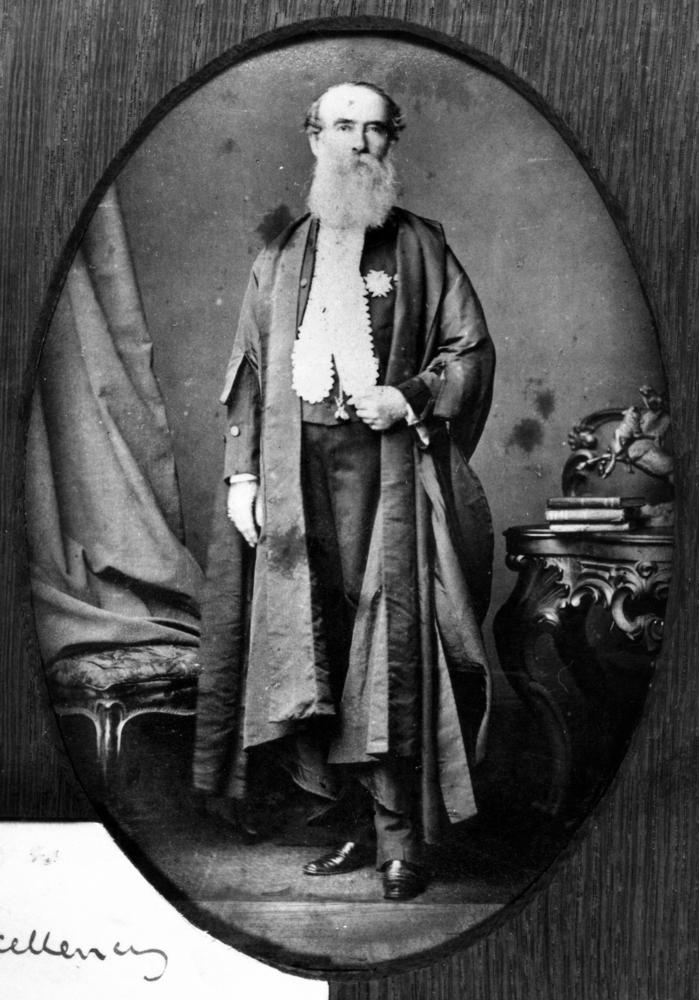
- Sir Maurice Charles O'Connell, 1868, after whom the suburb is named

- Interactive map of O'Connell
- Coordinates: 23.9288°S 151.2697°E
- Country: Australia
- State: Queensland
- City: Gladstone
- LGA: Gladstone Region
- Location: 10.0 km (6.2 mi) S of Gladstone CBD; 117 km (73 mi) SE of Rockhampton; 526 km (327 mi) NNW of Brisbane

Government
  - State electorate: Gladstone
  - Federal division: Flynn

Area
  - Total: 12.1 km^{2} (4.7 sq mi)

Population
  - Total: 399 (2021 census)
  - Density: 32.98/km^{2} (85.4/sq mi)
- Time zone: UTC+10:00 (AEST)
- Postcode: 4680
Suburbs around O'Connell
Glen Eden	Glen Eden	Glen Eden
Burua; Kirkwood	O'Connell	South Trees
Wurdong Heights	Wurdong Heights	Boyne Island

O'Connell is an outer southern suburb of Gladstone in the Gladstone Region, Queensland, Australia. In the 2021 census, O'Connell had a population of 399 people.

== Geography ==
The northern arm of the estuary of the Boyne River forms part of the eastern boundary. Gladstone–Benaraby Road (State Route 58) closely parallels much of the eastern boundary before passing through the south-eastern corner.

Toolooa railway station is an abandoned railway station on the North Coast railway line (23.9319°S 151.2895°E).

== History ==
The suburb is named after Sir Maurice Charles O'Connell who was the Government Resident at Port Curtis from 1854 to 1859. In 1860 (after the Separation of Queensland), O'Connell was appointed a member of the Queensland Legislative Council and was its President from 1860 to 1879.

== Demographics ==
In the 2016 census, O'Connell had a population of 317 people.

In the 2021 census, O'Connell had a population of 399 people.

== Education ==
There are no schools in O'Conell. The nearest government primary schools are Kin Kora State School in Kin Kora to the north and Gladstone South State School in South Gladstone to the north. The nearest government secondary school is Toolooa State High School in South Gladstone to the north.

== Amenities ==
There is a boat ramp and floating walkway on the Gladstone - Benaraby Road providing access to the South Trees Inlet (23.9360°S 151.2902°E). It is managed by the Gladstone Regional Council.
