= Glen Eden (disambiguation) =

Glen Eden is the name of:

- Glen Eden (ski area) in Milton, Ontario, Canada
- Glen Eden, a suburb of West Auckland, New Zealand
- Glen Eden, Queensland, a suburb of Gladstone, Queensland, Australia
