= Wurdong Heights, Queensland =

Wurdong Heights
- Suburb
- Interactive map of Wurdong Heights
- Coordinates: 23.9625°S 151.2833°E
- Country: Australia
- State: Queensland
- LGA: Gladstone Region
- Location: 11.1 km (6.9 mi) SW of Tannum Sands; 17.7 km (11.0 mi) E of Calliope; 20.4 km (12.7 mi) S of Gladstone CBD; 125 km (78 mi) SE of Rockhampton; 521 km (324 mi) NNW of Brisbane

Government
  - State electorate: Gladstone
  - Federal division: Flynn

Area
  - Total: 31.3 km^{2} (12.1 sq mi)

Population
  - Total: 465 (2021 census)
  - Density: 14.86/km^{2} (38.48/sq mi)
- Time zone: UTC+10:00 (AEST)
- Postcode: 4680
Suburbs around Wurdong Heights
| Burua | O'Connell | Boyne Island |
| Calliope | Wurdong Heights | Boyne Island |
| Calliope | Benaraby | Tannum Sands |

Wurdong Heights is a rural locality in the Gladstone Region, Queensland, Australia. In the 2021 census, Wurdong Heights had a population of 465 people.

== Geography ==
The Bruce Highway forms the southern boundary of the locality. The Gladstone–Benaraby Road runs through from north to south. The North Coast railway line traverses the locality entering from the south and exiting to the north-east, but there are no railway stations within the locality.

The Boyne River forms part of the south-eastern boundary of the locality as it heads towards the Coral Sea.

== Demographics ==
In the 2016 census, Wurdong Heights had a population of 462 people.

In the 2021 census, Wurdong Heights had a population of 465 people.

== Education ==
There are no schools in Wurdong Heights. The nearest government primary schools are Benaraby State School in neighbouring Benaraby to the south, Calliope State School in neighbouring Calliope to the south-west, and Kin Kora State School in Kin Kora to the north. The nearest government secondary schools are Tannum Sands State High School in neighbouring Tannum Sands to the south-east, Calliope State High School in Calliope, and Toolooa State High School in South Gladstone.

== Amenities ==
Lidster Park is on Helen Crescent in the south of the locality (23.9926°S 151.3013°E).
