= Friend Park, Barney Point =

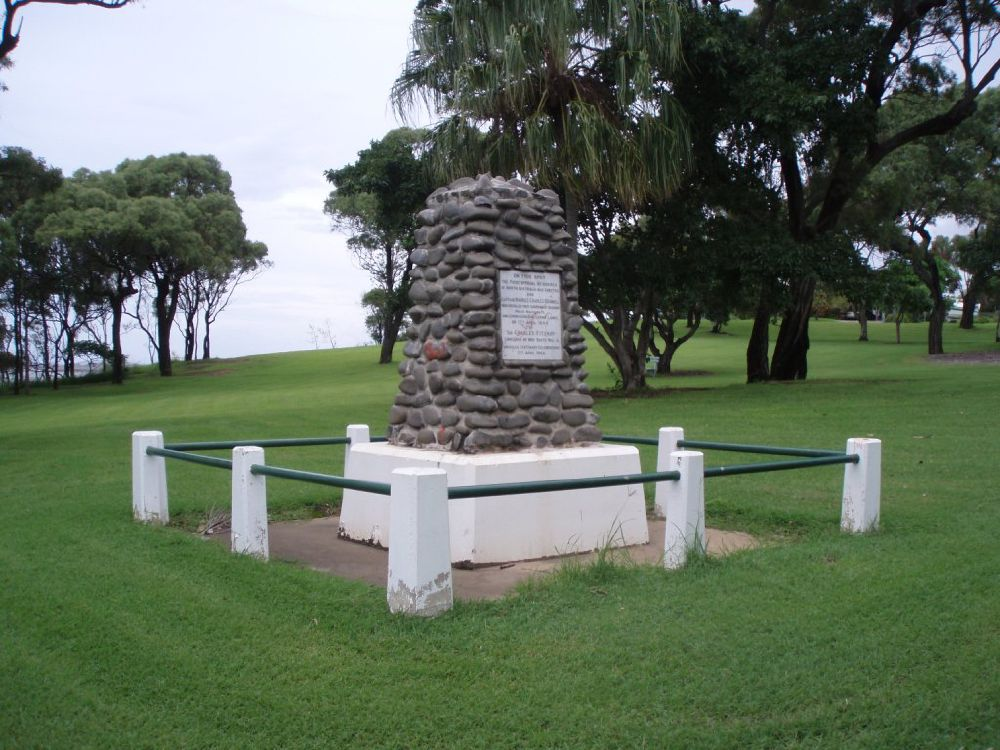
- Friend Park and Graves, 2009

- Location within Queensland Location within Australia
- 23.8493°S 151.275°E
- Location: Friend Street, Barney Point, Gladstone Region, Queensland, Australia

History
- Design period: 1840s–1860s (mid-19th century)
- Built: 1854–1856

Queensland Heritage Register
- Official name: Friend Park and Graves
- Type: state heritage (built, landscape)
- Designated: 3 December 2003
- Reference no.: 601341
- Significant period: 1854–56, 1929–present (historical, social); 1854–56, 1954, 1958 (fabric)
- Significant components: plaque, trees/plantings, burial/grave, wall/s – retaining, park / green space, memorial – cairn, grave surrounds/railings, dais, playground, flagpole/flagstaff, sarcophagus

Friend Park is a heritage-listed park at Friend Street, Barney Point, Gladstone Region, Queensland, Australia. It was built from 1854 to 1856. It was added to the Queensland Heritage Register on 3 December 2003.

== History ==
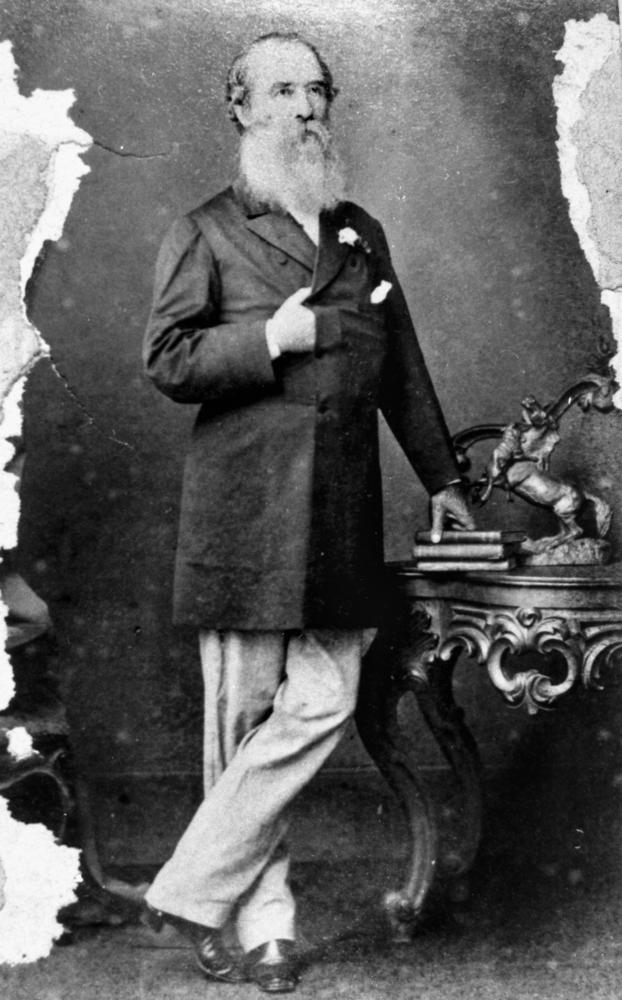
Sir Maurice Charles O'Connell, 1860

Friend Park is the site of the former Port Curtis Government Residence and Domain, established in 1854–56. The former residence was constructed for, and occupied by, Captain Maurice Charles O'Connell, who in 1854 was appointed Government Resident, Police Magistrate, and Commissioner of Crown Lands for the Port Curtis and Leichhardt districts of New South Wales (the separation of Queensland did not occur until 1859). The Domain was laid out in mid-1854, and a stone residence was completed by the end of 1856.

The township of Gladstone was established by the New South Wales Government in 1853–54. Historian Lorna McDonald suggests that this was possibly an attempt to create a more centralised alternative to Brisbane as the capital of a potential northern colony, because unlike most Queensland ports, Gladstone was established prior to the expansion of pastoral settlement in the hinterland. In April 1853 the Governor of New South Wales, Sir Charles Augustus Fitzroy, announced the intention of establishing a township at Port Curtis, and in May that year surveyor Francis MacCabe was instructed to undertake a survey for the town of Gladstone.

In naming the town Gladstone, Fitzroy commemorated British Colonial Secretary William Ewart Gladstone, who in 1846 had attempted to establish a northern colony in the Antipodes. On 17 February 1846 Queen Victoria signed Letters Patent establishing the Colony of North Australia, and the British Parliament passed an Act to define its boundaries, which included all lands and coastal islands north of latitude 26° south and extending from the east coast to the present-day Western Australia border. The new colony therefore included all of the present-day Northern Territory and most of what later became Queensland, but with the exception of the Moreton Bay, Darling Downs, and Maranoa districts. On 21 February 1846 Queen Victoria appointed Fitzroy as governor and commander in chief of the colony of North Australia, and on 25 May 1846 appointed Lieutenant-Colonel George Barney as Lieutenant-Governor and Superintendent of North Australia, to administer the new colony on Fitzroy's behalf.

Gladstone's objective in establishing the colony of North Australia was to provide a place of exile for expirees and reformed convicts from both Australian and British gaols. This in effect meant a resumption of transportation to eastern Australia, and was bitterly opposed in New South Wales. In late 1846 Gladstone was replaced as Colonial Secretary by Earl Grey, who reversed his predecessor's colonial policies. On 28 November 1846 Queen Victoria revoked the colony of North Australia, but word did not reach New South Wales before an attempt was made early in 1847 to establish a settlement at Port Curtis.

Colonel Barney and his family had arrived in Sydney in September 1846. Despite finding considerable colonial opposition to the resumption of convict transportation, Barney carried out his instructions and in November 1846 explored the North Australia coast and selected Port Curtis as a settlement site. Barney and the first contingent of 87 officials and settlers left Sydney on the barque Lord Auckland on 30 December 1846 and arrived at Port Curtis on 25 January 1847, during the height of the wet season. Their ship ran aground and the passengers were embarked at Facing Island, where they waited in tents for 7 weeks, surviving principally on dried meat and biscuits, before a relief ship, the barque Thomas Lowry, arrived on 14 March 1847. The wet season hindered the establishment of a settlement on the mainland, and there was discontent within the isolated community. The relief ship also brought news that the colony was likely to be abandoned. This was confirmed officially with the arrival of another ship on 14 April 1847. The settlement was disbanded between April and July 1847, during which time Colonel Barney took the opportunity to explore the Gladstone district, which he considered had great potential as the site of future settlement. Port Curtis he considered one of the finest natural harbours in the Australian colonies. Barney Point and Barney Point Beach are named in his honour.

The second attempt at non-indigenous settlement at Port Curtis, made six years later in 1853, was more successful. By 23 October 1853 Francis MacCabe had completed his Design for the Town of Gladstone, Port Curtis. Like Colonel Barney in 1847, he identified the area between Auckland Inlet and South Trees Inlet as the most suitable site for a settlement. The principal township was laid out near Auckland Inlet, but MacCabe set aside a substantial area from Barney Point to south of what is now Friend Park, as a reserve for Public Quay, Custom House and Public Offices; and a large reserve for Government House, Domain and Gardens further to the southeast, adjacent to Waapentake Creek. A large sand flat separated the proposed domain from the sea. MacCabe's plan was laid before the New South Wales Executive Council on 6 December 1853 and the Town of Gladstone was proclaimed on 21 December 1853.

On 1 January 1854 Captain Maurice Charles O'Connell, grandson of former New South Wales Governor Sir William Bligh, was appointed as Government Resident, Police Magistrate and Commissioner for Crown Lands for the Port Curtis and Leichhardt districts. These pastoral districts were proclaimed on 10 January 1854, with Port Curtis declared a settled district although only two stations had been established here by 1854.

The first sale of town lots at Gladstone was held in Sydney on 9 February 1854, and by the time O'Connell arrived at Port Curtis at the end of March 1854, the first slab buildings had been erected near Auckland Inlet. O'Connell and his family and other officials set up residence in tents at Barney Point Beach, in the area proposed as public reserve and out of the way of commercial development closer to Auckland Inlet. Here a small residential precinct soon developed. The O'Connells lived aboard ship for a month while a temporary government residence was being erected: a large marquee with a timber floor. It is understood that this marquee was erected on the low promontory at the southern end of Barney Point Beach, in the area now known as Friend Park.

On 16 April 1854 Governor Fitzroy arrived at Gladstone to inspect the fledgling settlement, and the following day officially installed O'Connell as Government Resident. Whether this ceremony occurred near the temporary government residence, in what is now Friend Park, is not clear. During the 1954 celebrations of the centenary of the establishment of Gladstone, the Gladstone community re-enacted the arrival of Fitzroy on Barney Point Beach and the installation ceremony, which was conducted in Friend Park before an audience of 6500 people. To commemorate the event, a cairn was unveiled in Friend Park.

By early July 1854 O'Connell had decided that the promontory at the southern end of Barney Point Beach, which had been intended as a temporary camp only, would be a more appropriate site for the government residence and domain than the site near Waapentake Creek selected by surveyor MacCabe. O'Connell's domain was laid out with gardens and fencing, but work on construction of a permanent residence in stone did not commence until 1855, and was not completed until late 1856.

Amongst O'Connell's regular reports to Sydney was an account of the accidental death on 16 September 1854 of 22 year old Thomas Milles Stratford Riddell, eldest son of the acting NSW colonial secretary. Riddell had been among the first purchasers of Gladstone land at the February 1854 sale in Sydney, and is thought to have accompanied O'Connell to Gladstone in March 1854. He had been assisting in carting water to the township in September when he was thrown under the wheels of the dray and killed instantly. He was buried in the government domain (now Friend Park), and by the early 1900s his grave was marked by a stone sarcophagus. Another early burial in the domain was that of Lieutenant Le Strange. This grave was known in 1954, when a wreath was laid on it during the centenary celebrations, but is no longer evident.

At the first census of Gladstone conducted by O'Connell in May 1854, the small community comprised 127 non-indigenous residents. A young visitor to the place in March 1855, Richard Mitchell, claimed the township was known locally as Auckland Point and consisted of two commercial stores and a courthouse near Auckland Inlet, while everyone except the storekeepers lived at Barney Point – likely either on or adjacent to the area set aside (but not yet proclaimed) for a public reserve.

O'Connell, autocratic by nature and fiery of temperament, was not well liked in the small Gladstone community. Although his correspondence reveals that he had great hopes for the future of Gladstone and Port Curtis, his critics accused him of inaction, and in late 1855 he faced a Select Committee Inquiry into the conduct of the Government Residency at Port Curtis. As a result, the status of Port Curtis was reduced from that of a government residency with its own revenue and government administration, to that of a pastoral district. O'Connell filed his last report as Port Curtis Resident on 26 April 1856, but remained at Gladstone as Lands Commissioner, still occupying the temporary tent house erected for him in April 1854. In late 1856 he moved into the stone dwelling completed in the government domain.

O'Connell was reinstated as Government Resident in September 1858 to handle the rapid influx of population into the Port Curtis District following the discovery of gold at Canoona. The Canoona gold rush from August 1858 briefly revived the fortunes of the district, but O'Connell's hopes that Port Curtis and Gladstone would now develop their potential were crushed when it became clear that most prospectors were accessing the Canoona goldfield via Rockhampton. In June 1859 the non-indigenous population of Gladstone was 203, which represented an 8-person increase since 1856, while that of Rockhampton stood at 250.

In June 1859, Queen Victoria signed Letters Patent separating the colony of Queensland north of the 29th parallel of latitude, and following the arrival of Governor Bowen and the proclamation of the new colony on 10 December 1859, the Port Curtis Residency became redundant. O'Connell was informed in February 1860, following which he moved to Brisbane where he served as President of the Queensland Legislative Council from 27 August 1860 to 23 March 1879. He still held an interest in the Port Curtis District, being the pastoral lessee of the Riverston run on the Boyne River.

Following the abolition of the Port Curtis Residency, O'Connell petitioned the Queensland Government to be allowed to purchase his former house and grounds at Barney Point, claiming that he had invested a considerable amount of his own money on improvements, but the colonial government refused.

A survey plan (G14.1) of the government buildings erected at Barney Point, completed by surveyor Clarendon Stuart by 9 July 1860, indicates that the government residency was located on what is now Friend Park. It was a well-ordered establishment comprising a main house, three out houses, stable, cow yard, a formally laid out garden with pathways, and front fencing. To the northwest of the government residence, outside what is now Friend Park, an old brick shed was identified, and further to the northwest, overlooking Barney Point Beach, was the house of the Clerk of Petty Sessions. To the southwest was a more extensive garden and stock yard, which appear to have been associated with the government residence. No graves were identified on the plan.

On 11 July 1862 Surveyor Permien completed a survey of sections 55 to 86 of the Town of Gladstone (survey plan G14.7). The area of the government residency and domain was surveyed as section 65 of the Town of Gladstone (later Friend Park), and on this the improvements comprised a stone house, another stone dwelling, stables, garden and fencing. These correspond closely to the improvements indicated on surveyor Stuart's 1860 survey plan. Again, no graves were identified on the plan.

Whether anyone occupied the former government residence after O'Connell's departure has not been established. On 28 December 1864 section 65 was purchased from the Crown for £412/10/-, in the name of Alfred Henry Brown of Gladstone. This AH Brown was the six-year-old son of Henry Hort Brown, not to be confused with the Alfred Henry Brown of Gin Gin Station in the Port Curtis Pastoral District. HH Brown was resident in the Port Curtis District by July 1858, when his son Alfred Henry was born, and was among a small party of Gladstone citizens who had prospected for gold at Canoona in mid-1858 and who were largely responsible for the rush of late 1858.

It has not been established whether the Brown family ever lived in the former government residence. The family was resident in the Richmond district of New South Wales during most of the 1860s, where children were born in 1860, 1862, 1863, 1865, and 1867. They had returned to Queensland by December 1867 and were still in this colony in November 1870, but may not have been resident in Gladstone. Thereafter no further record of this family in Queensland has been located. Henry Hort Brown died in the Helensburgh district of New South Wales in 1904. Following his death, the site of the former Port Curtis Government Residency was transferred to his widow, Theresa Brown.

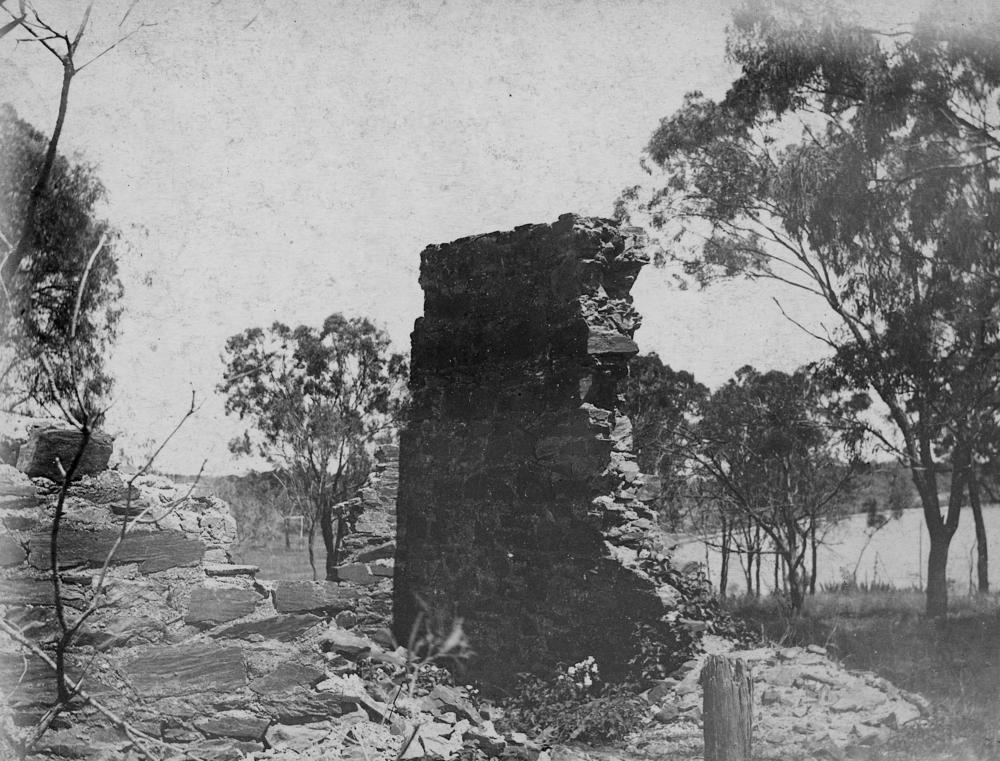
Ruins of Government Residence, Gladstone, 1906

The former government residence at Port Curtis had been long abandoned by late 1888, when a sketch captioned "Ruins of Government Residence, Port Curtis" appeared in the Australasian Sketcher with Pen and Pencil of 27 December 1888. The sketch shows the partly crumbling walls of a roofless stone residence. Photographs of the ruins taken in 1905 and 1906 show only remnants of the stone walls, and the site overgrown with grasses and saplings.

By the 1920s some members of the Gladstone community were keen to see the site conserved. In 1927 the Gladstone Chamber of Commerce urged the Gladstone Town Council to preserve "historic spots" such as the graves at Barney Point ([that is, those located in the former government domain at the southern end of Barney Point Beach). Following the death of Theresa Brown in December 1927, the site was acquired in 1929 from her family (who were resident in Sydney) by Gladstone businessmen and former alderman Henry Friend junior. Friend had purchased the property with the express intention of presenting it to the Gladstone Town Council, which he did in November 1929. As a site of strong historical significance to the Gladstone community, the land was to be held by the Council in perpetuity for the people of Gladstone. To honour the generous gift, the site was named Friend Park.

In 1935 George Simmons, curator of the Rockhampton Botanical Gardens, provided sketch plans for Gladstone's three parks: Friend Park, Victoria Park [on Auckland Hill] and Central Park, and Rockhampton City Council gifted trees to Gladstone to assist in the park improvements.

During 1954 the highlight of the centenary celebrations was the unveiling by Gladstone's oldest inhabitant, Mrs Fanny Golding, of the cairn in Friend Park commemorating the installation of Captain Maurice O'Connell as Government Resident on 17 April 1854.

In the mid-1950s Gladstone's Junior Chamber of Commerce (established in 1954) made the creation of a children's playground in Friend Park its principal project. In December 1958 the Gladstone Jaycees handed over the completed playground to the Council.

The place remains one of Gladstone's principal parks, and a popular picnic area. In the late 20th century a decision was made by the Gladstone City Council to remove the stone foundations and remnants of the 1856 government residence.

On Sunday 22 June 2003 a memorial cairn to Francis MacCabe was unveiled in Friend Park by the Mayor of Gladstone Peter Corones.

== Description ==
Friend Park is a 1.72 hectares (4.3 acres) site located on a low promontory or headland at the southern end of Barney Point Beach and Barney Point Park. The promontory juts into Port Curtis on its northern and eastern sides, with views across Port Curtis, and a rocky foreshore extends around the promontory from Barney Point Beach. On the west the site is bounded by Sutton Street and on the south by Friend Street.

The site slopes (gently in some sections, more steeply in others) down to the foreshore, the slope being rocky and covered with agave spp and indigenous small trees and grasses.

The foreshore is composed of principally alluvial muds from the Calliope River and various creek systems entering Port Curtis, deposited over Carboniferous sandstones and mudstones of the Wondilla Group.

At the northern end of Friend Park a low dry-stone retaining wall separates a gentle sloping bank from the foreshore and Barney Point Park. The slope here is grassed and almost terraced, and a "stair" of stones set into the ground at intervals enables easy access to the parkland above.

Above the slope the park comprises an open lawn with specimen trees, including a lone Norfolk Island pine (Araucaria heterophylla), Ficus sp., palms, and Eucalyptus sp.], several memorials, a timber dais, and children's play equipment.

Close to the apex of the site is the 1954 cairn. This is a four-sided, tapering structure with a flat top, constructed of what appears to be water-polished stone. It rests on a substantial concrete base about 800 millimetres (31 in) high, and has a bitumened plinth and a low concrete-post-and- single-steel-rail surround. On the northern face of the cairn is a marble plaque with the lettering:

On this spot the first official residence in North Australia was erected, and Captain Maurice Charles O'Connell was installed first Government Resident, Police Magistrate and Commission of Crown Lands, on 17th April 1854 by Sir Charles Fitzroy Governor of New South Wales. Unveiled Centenary Celebrations 17th April 1954.

In the mid-north section of the park is a low-set timber dais resting on timber stumps, with timber railing to three sides and a timber ramp to enable easy access. Just west of this is the grave of Thomas Riddell. This has a stone sarcophagus with two inscriptions, and an iron grave surround (not original) with concrete corner posts. The inscriptions on the sarcophagus read:

Underneath this stone are deposited the remains of THOMAS MILLES STRATFORD RIDDELL eldest son of the Acting Colonial Secretary and Mrs Riddell. and He was born at Sydney on 22 January 1832 and died at Port Curtis on the 16 September 1854 aged 22 years.

Further west still is a steel flagstaff associated with the creation of the 1958 children's play area in Friend Park. This has a tapered concrete base, with a metal plaque on the western face which bears the following inscription:

This play area was planned and equipped by the Gladstone Junior Chamber of Commerce and presented to the citizens of Gladstone on 6 December 1958.

While there are no above-ground relics associated with the use of the site as the Port Curtis Government Residence and Domain, there are likely to be sub-surface deposits of archaeological interest.

== Heritage listing ==
Friend Park and Graves was listed on the Queensland Heritage Register on 3 December 2003 having satisfied the following criteria.

The place is important in demonstrating the evolution or pattern of Queensland's history.

Friend Park is one of the most significant historical sites in the Gladstone district, being closely associated with the establishment of Gladstone township in 1853–54. It is also a significant place in Queensland's history, being the site of the former Government Residence and Domain of the Port Curtis Residency, associated with the early development of Port Curtis as the potential hub of a possible northern colony separate from New South Wales.

The place has potential to yield information that will contribute to an understanding of Queensland's history.

Although little above-ground evidence remains of the former use of the site as the Port Curtis Government Residence and Domain, the place is significant for its potential to reveal archaeological information which may assist in our understanding of Queensland's history. This includes evidence of structures and graves on the site, as well as artefacts associated with daily life in the government domain of a remote, mid-19th century British colonial settlement.

The place is important because of its aesthetic significance.

The place is significant for the retention of historical views to and from the headland. In particular the view from the headland across Port Curtis varies little from that which Government Resident Captain Maurice O'Connell found in 1854, when he decided to establish the Government Residence and Domain on this promontory.

The place has a strong or special association with a particular community or cultural group for social, cultural or spiritual reasons.

The site has long been valued by the local community for its association with the early history of Gladstone. This is demonstrated in the purchase of the site and donation to the Gladstone Town Council in 1929 by Henry Friend jnr; the erection of a cairn in the park in 1954 to celebrate the centenary of the founding of Gladstone; and Gladstone City Council's nomination of the early graves to the Queensland Heritage Register in the 1990s.
