= South Trees, Queensland =

South Trees
- Suburb
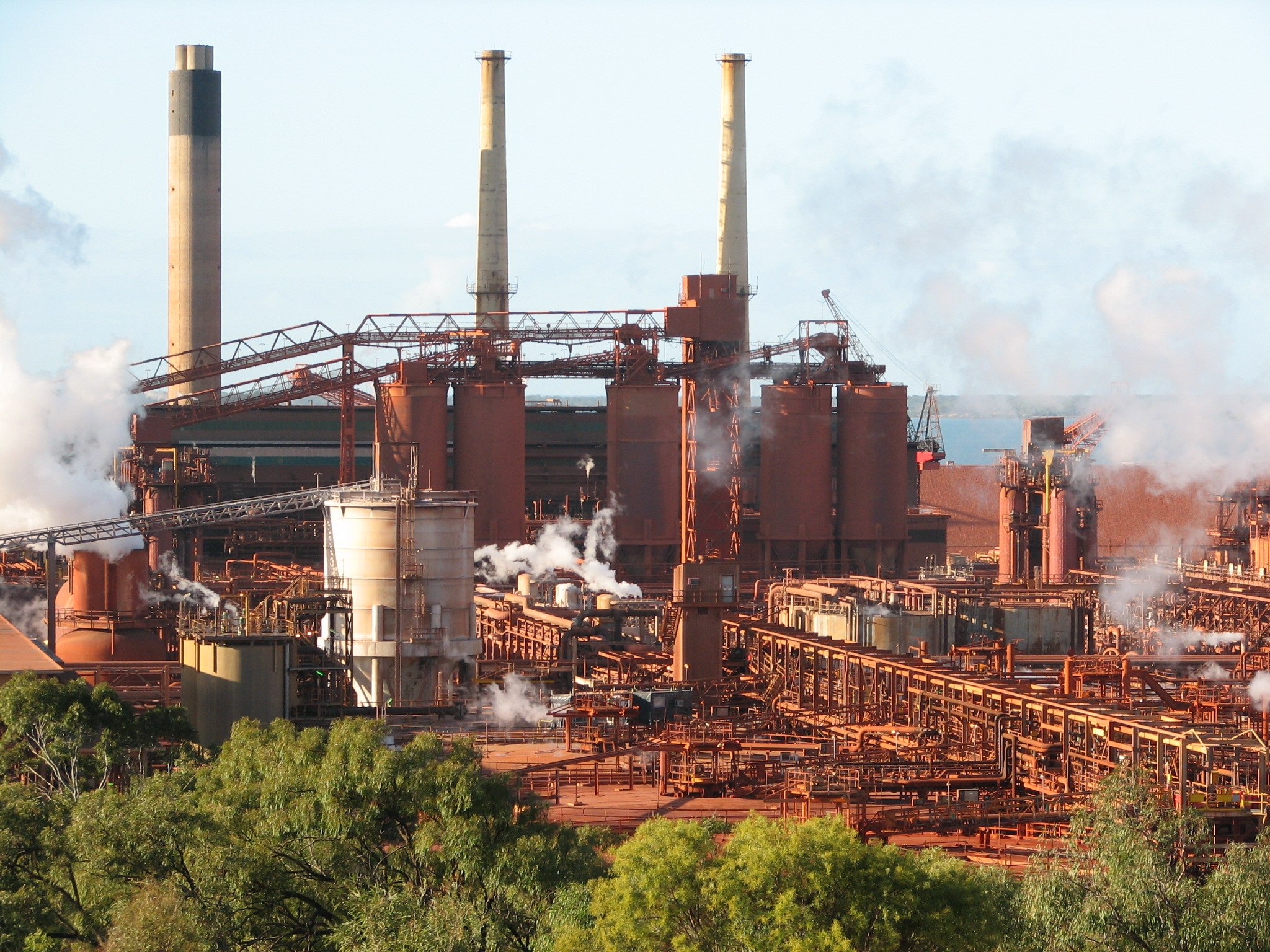
- Qld Alumin Refinery, 2008

- Interactive map of South Trees
- Coordinates: 23.8905°S 151.3019°E
- Country: Australia
- State: Queensland
- City: Gladstone
- LGA: Gladstone Region
- Location: 8.8 km (5.5 mi) SSE of Gladstone CBD; 116 km (72 mi) SE of Rockhampton; 535 km (332 mi) NNW of Brisbane

Government
  - State electorate: Gladstone
  - Federal division: Flynn

Area
  - Total: 29.3 km^{2} (11.3 sq mi)

Population
  - Total: 0 (2021 census)
  - Density: 0.000/km^{2} (0.00/sq mi)
- Time zone: UTC+10:00 (AEST)
- Postcode: 4680
Suburbs around South Trees
Barney Point	Gladstone Harbour	Coral Sea
South Gladstone; Toolooa	South Trees	Boyne Island
Glen Eden	O'Connell	Boyne Island

South Trees is a coastal industrial suburb of Gladstone in the Gladstone Region, Queensland, Australia. In the 2021 census, South Trees had "no people or a very low population".

== Geography ==
South Trees is a coastal suburb facing the Auckland Channel, a waterway separated from the Coral Sea by Facing Island. The suburb consists of three non-contiguous areas of island, including the land around Parsons Point to the west of the South Trees Inlet and two islands within the South Trees Inlet, the northern one called South Trees Island while the southern one is unnamed.

The suburb is used only for industrial purposes. In the Parsons Point area is the Queensland Alumina Limited refinery with a footprint of 80 hectares (200 acres) of a 3,050-hectare (7,500-acre) site. There is a causeway bridge from Parsons Point to South Trees Island where the refinery's wharf and storage facility is located.

The Gladstone–Benaraby Road and North Coast railway line just inside or just outside the western boundary of the locality.

== History ==
The suburb takes its name from South Trees Point, which in turn was named about 6 August 182 by explorer Matthew Flinders on HMS Investigator on the first circumnavigation of Australia.

The Queensland Alumina refinery was commissioned in 1967.

== Demographics ==
In the 2016 census, South Trees had "no people or a very low population".

In the 2021 census, South Trees had "no people or a very low population".

== Economy ==
Queensland Alumina Plant is one of Australia's largest alumina refineries (23.8664°S 151.2890°E). The refinery has an annual capacity of 3,950,000 tonnes of alumina.

== Amenities ==
Gladstone Kart Club is off South Trees Drive (23.90465°S 151.28693°E).

Gladstone Clay Target Club is also off South Tree Drive (23.90616°S 151.28611°E).

== Facilities ==
South Trees Sewage Treatment Plant is at 15 Wapentake Road (23.9043°S 151.2933°E).

== Attractions ==
Queensland Alumina Lookout provides a panoramic view of bauxite processing (23.8718°S 151.2867°E). It is off QAL Access Road.
