= Queensland Alumina Limited =

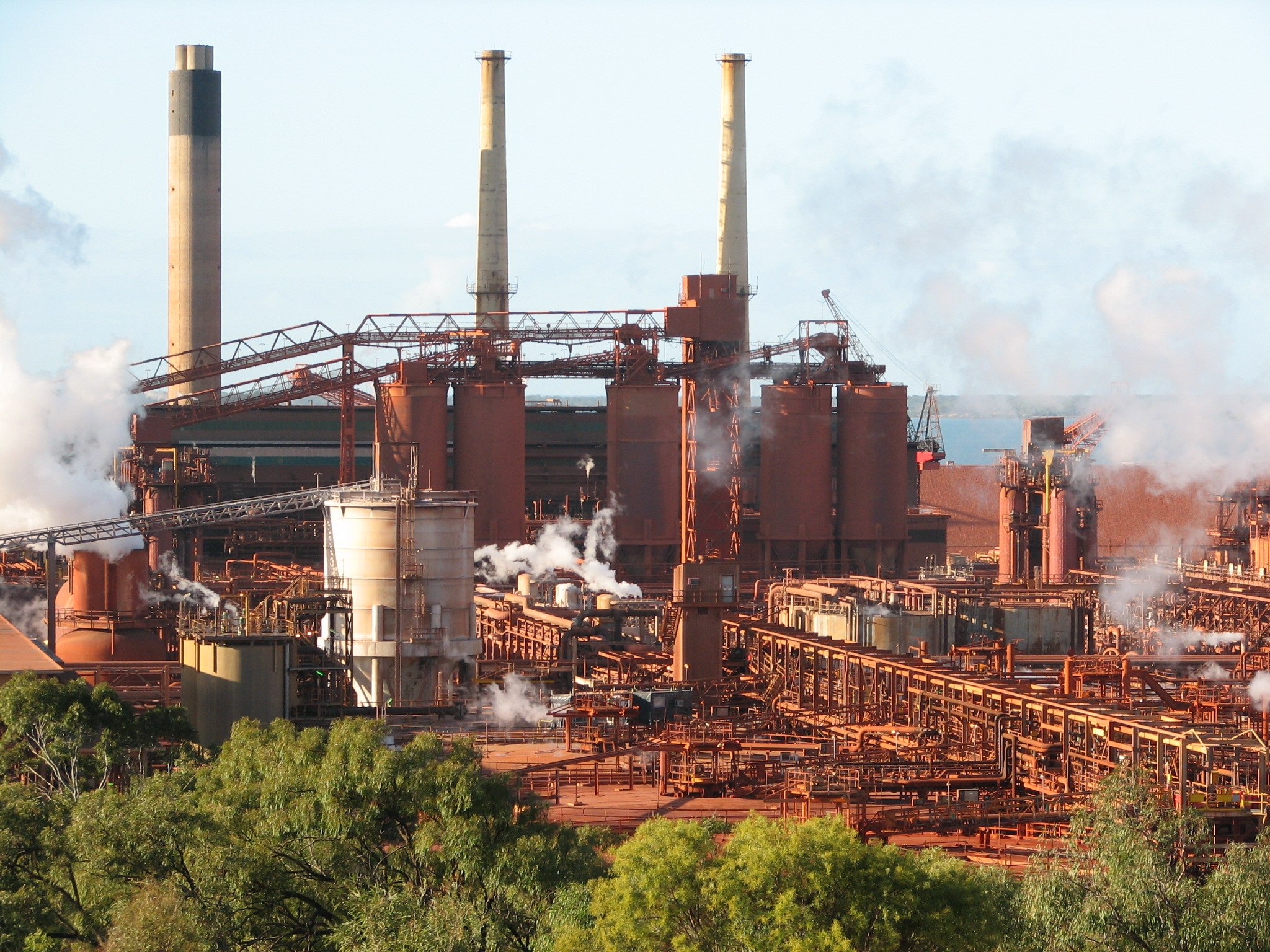
- The refinery in 2008
- Operated: Since 1967
- Location: Gladstone, Queensland
- Coordinates: 23°52′1″S 151°17′25″E
- Industry: Alumina refinery
- Owners: Rio Tinto Alcan (80%); Rusal (20%)

Queensland Alumina Limited (QAL) is one of the largest alumina refineries by alumina production capacity in the world, located in Parsons Point, South Trees, Gladstone, Queensland, Australia.

The refinery was planned in 1964 and has been operating since 1967, the refinery has a capacity to produce 3.95 million tonnes of alumina a year. In 1981 the output was at a quarterly basis over 600,000 tonnes per quarter.

At times of lower demand, operations have been altered. Subsequent rises in demand have seen expansion in output and employment.

QAL has been operated by a range of consortium partners of international aluminium producers over time. Comalco brought in to the consortium in 1969. In 1982 it was owned Comalco (30.3%), Kaiser Aluminum (28.3%), Alcan (21.4%), and Pechiney Ugine Kuhlmann (20%).

Since April 2005, it has been owned by Rio Tinto Alcan (80%) and Rusal (20%). In September 2017 the QAL celebrated 50 years of operation.

== See also ==
- List of alumina refineries
