= Calliope, Queensland =

Calliope
- Town
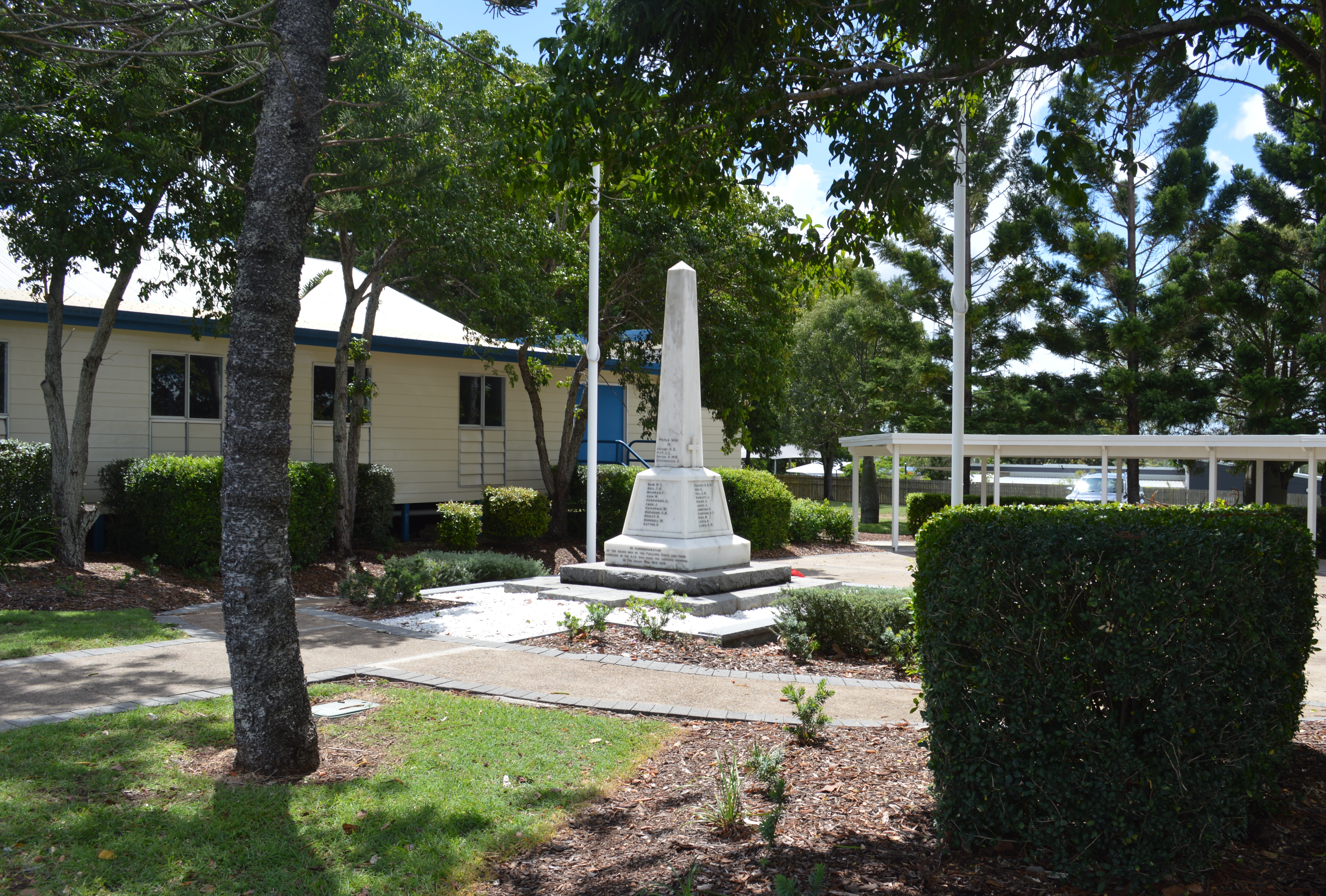
- War memorial at Calliope, 2017

- Interactive map of Calliope
- Coordinates: 24.0061°S 151.1988°E
- Country: Australia
- State: Queensland
- LGA: Gladstone Region
- Location: 23.3 km (14.5 mi) SSW of Gladstone; 531 km (330 mi) NNW of Brisbane
- Established: 1871

Government
  - State electorates: Callide; Gladstone
  - Federal division: Flynn

Area
  - Total: 182.9 km^{2} (70.6 sq mi)

Population
  - Total: 5,263 (2021 census)
  - Density: 28.775/km^{2} (74.528/sq mi)
- Time zone: UTC+10:00 (AEST)
- Postcode: 4680
Localities around Calliope
West Stowe; River Ranch	Burua	Wurdong Heights
Wooderson	Calliope	Benaraby
Wooderson	Taragoola	Taragoola

Calliope is a rural town and locality in the Gladstone Region, Queensland, Australia. In the 2021 census, the locality of Calliope had a population of 5,263 people.

== Geography ==
Calliope is near the 'cross-roads' of the Bruce Highway and the Dawson Highway in Central Queensland, 20 kilometres (12 mi) SSW of the port city of Gladstone. Gladstone–Monto Road (State Route 69) runs south from the Dawson Highway through the locality.

== History ==
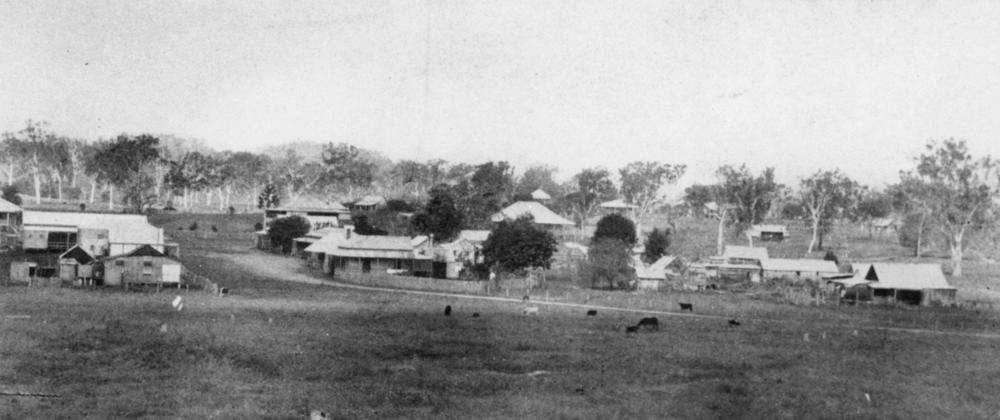
Township, 1928

The town takes its name from the Calliope River, which in turn was named after HMS Calliope by the Governor of New South Wales, Charles Augustus FitzRoy, on 18 April 1854, after travelling from Sydney to Port Curtis on board that ship.

Industries of the town and surrounds since that time have included gold mining, beef, timber, and more recently heavy industry (Aluminium, Coal, LNG), shipping and tourism.

Alluvial gold was mined in the area after its discovery in 1862. The following year, Queensland's first goldfield was officially proclaimed.

Calliope Post Office opened on 1 March 1864.

Calliope State School opened on 2 September 1872.

Booroom State School opened in 1911 and closed in 1939. Booroom is a parish west of Calliope.

After many years of lobbying from local residents fighting for a high school to be established in the town, Calliope State High School opened to students for the first time on 28 January 2020. A total of 165 students in Years 7 and 8 were the first students to attend the school.

== Demographics ==
In the 2011 census, the locality of Calliope had a population of 3,058 people.

In the 2016 census, the locality of Calliope had a population of 3,438 people.

In the 2021 census, the locality of Calliope had a population of 5,263 people.

== Local attractions ==
The Calliope River Historical Village is situated on the banks of the Calliope River. Lake Awoonga resulted from the construction of a dam on the Boyne River. Lake Awoonga supplies water to the city of Gladstone, and Calliope and other townships in the region, as well as supplying the major industries for which the Gladstone region is known. Total capacity of Lake Awoonga is 777,000 megalitres (203,412,500,000 gallons). The catchment area contributing to the Lake is 2,240 square kilometres (864.87 square miles) and is surrounded by the Boyne, Dawes and Many Peaks Ranges.

Lake Awoonga is home to an array of native animals, several of which are of conservation significance. Two fauna species are listed as vulnerable: the yellow-bellied glider and the grey-headed flying fox. Lake Awoonga has more than 225 species or over 27% of Australia's bird species found in the region. The southern squatter pigeon is listed as vulnerable and of conservation significance, and twenty-seven species are listed on International Migratory Conservation Agreement lists. Lake Awoonga is arguably one of the most important near-coast bird refuges on the East Coast of Australia.

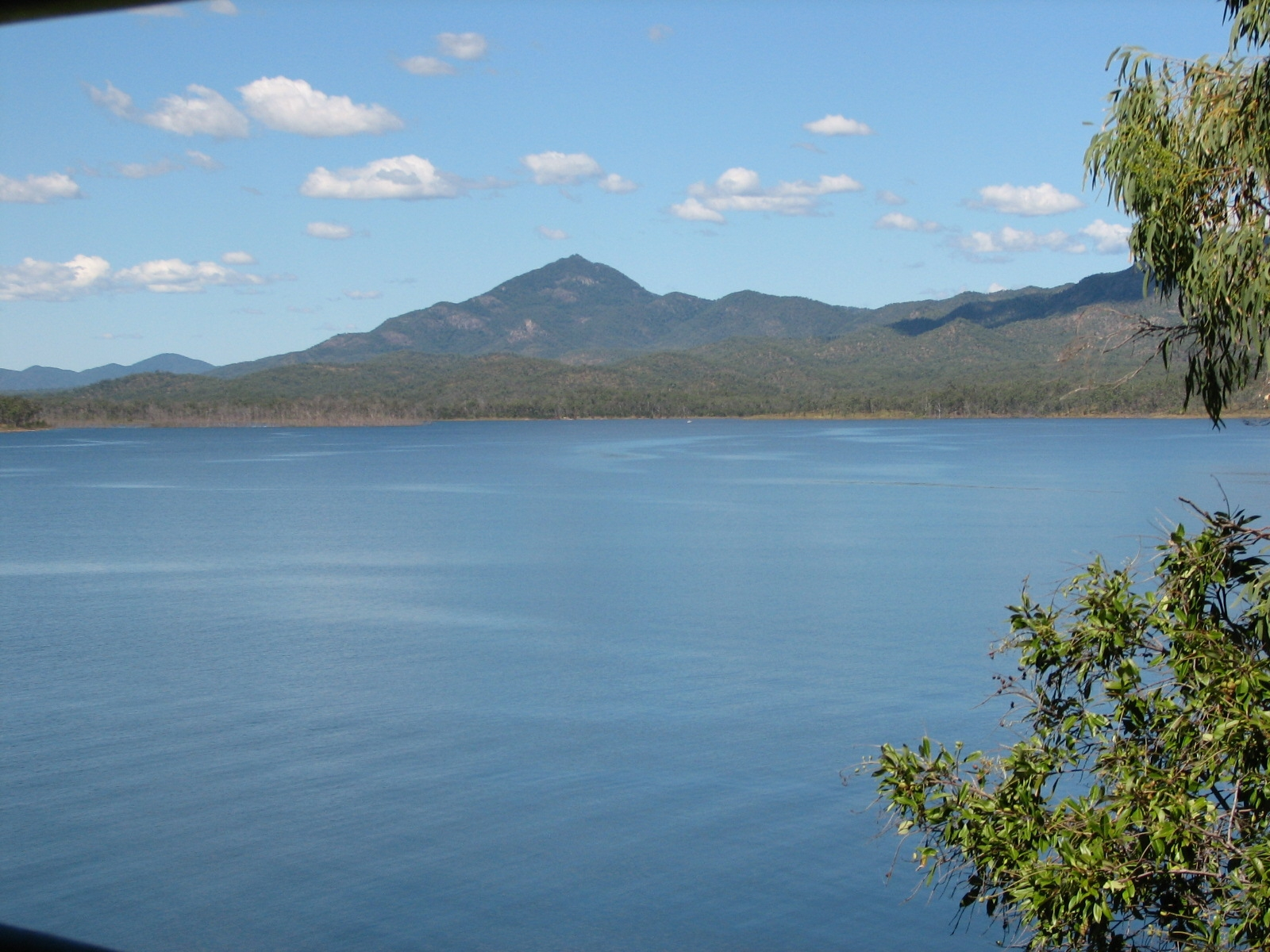
View of Lake Awoonga

The Gladstone Area Water Board operates a fish hatchery which breeds barramundi and mangrove jack for release into Lake Awoonga. Barramundi over 20 kilograms (44 lb) are regularly caught, and the heaviest caught by August 2008 weighed in at 36.5 kilograms (80 lb). In addition, the mangrove jack breeding program has resulted in Lake Awoonga holding the largest stocks in Australia with over 13,000 released. Since 1996 over two and a half million barramundi fingerlings and 340,000 mullet fingerlings have been released into Lake Awoonga.

Calliope has an 18-hole golf course with club and a bowls club. There are two pubs and an annual rodeo held each year. The town also has a swimming pool, racecourse, sports fields, Hazelbrook Park and a skateboard ramp.

Recent years have seen the introduction of a child care centre, supermarket shopping, specialty stores, doctors surgeries and other essential services. A large number of new homes and town houses have been built in Calliope due to its proximity to Gladstone Port and associated industries such as LNG.

== Amenities ==
Until 2008, Calliope was the council headquarters of the Calliope Shire which included Boyne Island, Tannum Sands, Ambrose, Mount Larcom and most of the industrial plants plus Awoonga dam. Calliope has now become one of the towns under the umbrella of the Gladstone Regional Council after the merger of the Calliope Shire Council and the former Gladstone City Council. GRC still maintain significant offices in Calliope.

The Calliope Library is on Don Cameron Drive; it is operated by the Gladstone Regional Council. There is a Gladstone Regional Council administration centre at 5 Don Cameron Drive.

Media: Calliope is serviced by Christian FM radio 87.6FM.

The Calliope branch of the Queensland Country Women's Association meets at the CWA Hall at 2 Bloomfield Street.

== Education ==
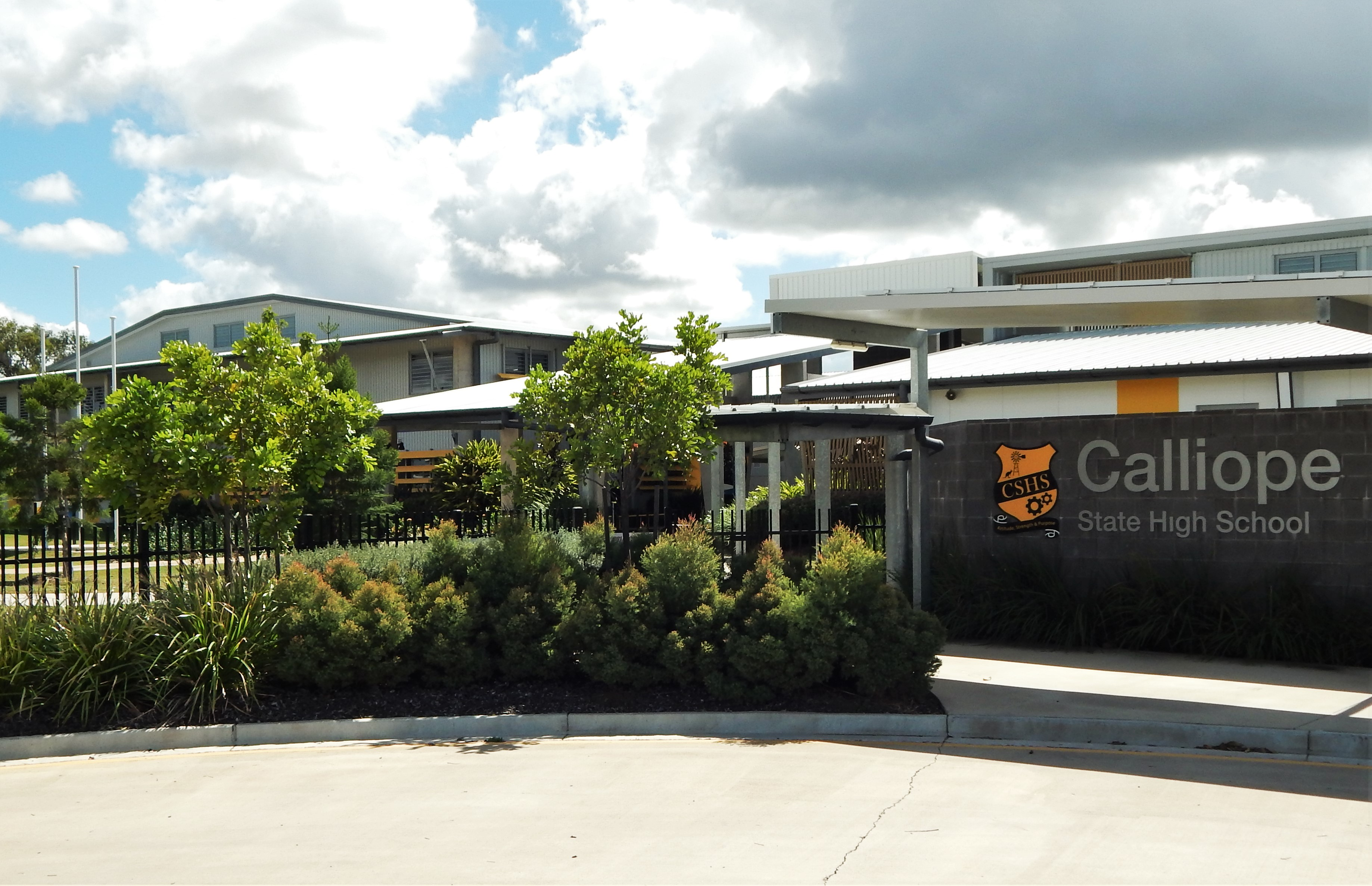
Calliope State High School, 2022

Calliope State School is a government primary (Prep–6) school for boys and girls at 14 Stirrat Street (24.0048°S 151.2029°E). In 2017, the school had an enrolment of 613 students with 48 teachers (41 full-time equivalent) and 24 non-teaching staff (16 full-time equivalent). It includes a special education program.

Calliope State High School is a government secondary (7–12) school for boys and girls at 55 Don Cameron Drive. In 2024, the school had an enrolment of 464 students with 39 teachers (36 full-time equivalent) and 27 non-teaching staff (23 full-time equivalent). Facilities at the school include ten general learning spaces, 12 specialty learning spaces, a technology centre, a science centre, hospitality centre, a multi-purpose hall and an oval. It also has an administration building, resource centre and a canteen.

== See also ==
- Boyne Valley, Australia
