= Glen Eden, Queensland =

Glen Eden
- Suburb
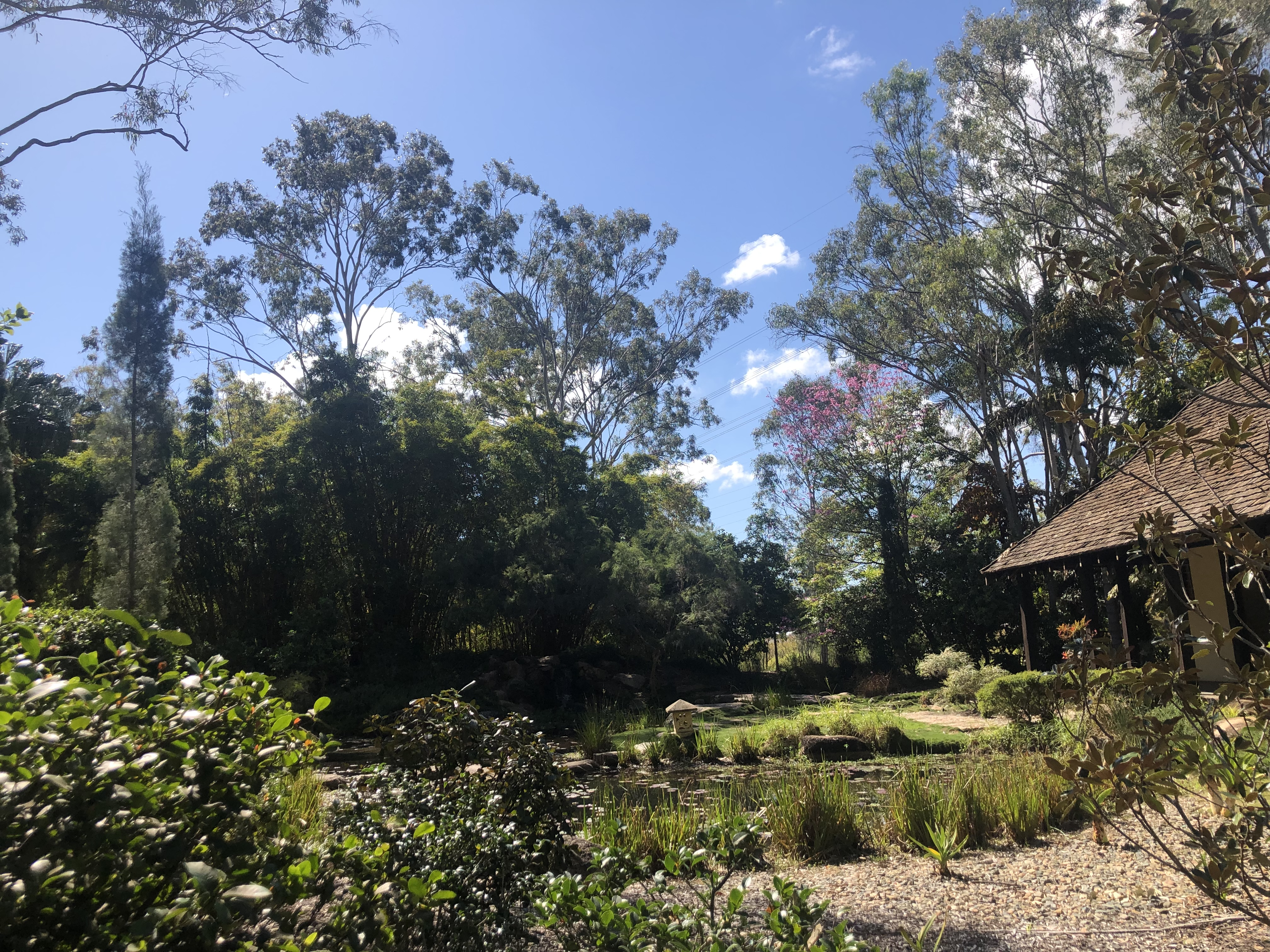
- Tondoon Botanic Gardens

- Interactive map of Glen Eden
- Coordinates: 23.9019°S 151.2672°E
- Country: Australia
- State: Queensland
- City: Gladstone
- LGA: Gladstone Region
- Location: 4.3 km (2.7 mi) S of Kin Kora; 6.0 km (3.7 mi) SSW of South Gladstone; 7.3 km (4.5 mi) S of Gladstone Central; 510 km (320 mi) NNW of Brisbane

Government
  - State electorate: Gladstone
  - Federal division: Flynn

Area
  - Total: 7.0 km^{2} (2.7 sq mi)

Population
  - Total: 2,918 (2021 census)
  - Density: 416.9/km^{2} (1,080/sq mi)
- Time zone: UTC+10:00 (AEST)
- Postcode: 4680
Suburbs around Glen Eden
Telina	Toolooa	South Trees
Kirkwood	Glen Eden	South Trees
O'Connell	O'Connell	O'Connell

Glen Eden is a suburb of Gladstone in the Gladstone Region, Queensland, Australia. In the 2021 census, Glen Eden had a population of 2,918 people.

== Geography ==
The suburb is bounded roughly by the North Coast railway line to the east, Kirkwood Road to the south, and Police Creek to the west. The Gladstone–Benaraby Road runs along the north-east boundary.

Biondello is a mountain (23.8930°S 151.2561°E) in the north of the suburb at 145 metres (476 ft) above sea level.

The north-east of the suburb is residential while the north-west (including Biondello) contains part of the Tondoon Botanic Gardens incorporating the Tondoon Creek Weir. In the south-west is the Gecko Valley winery and vineyards on a 100-hectare (250-acre) site. As at 2020, the south-east of the suburb is undeveloped.

== History ==
Lake Tondoon was formed by the Tondoon Weir and was the water supply for Gladstone from 1916 to 1945.

The Gecko Valley Winery was established in 1992.

St Stephens Lutheran College opened in 2002 but closed at the end of 2016 due to declining enrolments after families moved away to find employment. It was at 302 Glenlyon Road (23.9089°S 151.2663°E).

The Queensland Baptist community opened Carinity Education Gladstone on the former St Stephens campus in June 2017.

== Demographics ==
In the 2016 census, Glen Eden had a population of 2,778 people.

In the 2021 census, Glen Eden had a population of 2,918 people.

== Education ==
Carinity Education Gladstone is an independent Baptist special secondary school (7-12) for boys and girls at 803 Glenlyon Road (23.9087°S 151.2663°E). The school specialises in working individually with children who are disconnected from their schools or communities to support them in achieving educational qualifications and life skills.

There are no regular schools in Glen Eden. The nearest government primary schools are Kin Kora State School in Kin Kora to the north and Gladstone South State School in South Gladstone to the north-east. The nearest government secondary school is Toolooa State High School in South Gladstone.

== Attractions ==
The Tondoon Botanic Gardens are operated by the Gladstone Regional Council and feature tropical, sub-tropical and dry rainforest plants from various parts of Queensland. It includes Lake Tondoon, an orchid house, an arboretum, and a Japanese garden with tea house.

The Gecko Valley Winery has a visitor centre with wine tasting, cafe and a gallery for art and jewellery.
