= Telina, Queensland =

Telina
- Suburb
- Interactive map of Telina
- Coordinates: 23.8886°S 151.2527°E
- Country: Australia
- State: Queensland
- City: Gladstone
- LGA: Gladstone Region
- Location: 7.0 km (4.3 mi) S of Gladstone Central; 112 km (70 mi) SE of Rockhampton; 530 km (330 mi) NNW of Brisbane

Government
  - State electorate: Gladstone
  - Federal division: Flynn

Area
  - Total: 1.5 km^{2} (0.58 sq mi)

Population
  - Total: 2,197 (2021 census)
  - Density: 1,460/km^{2} (3,790/sq mi)
- Time zone: UTC+10:00 (AEST)
- Postcode: 4680
Suburbs around Telina
Kin Kora	Sun Valley	Toolooa
New Auckland	Telina	Toolooa
New Auckland	Kirkwood	Glen Eden

Telina is a suburb of Gladstone in the Gladstone Region, Queensland, Australia. In the 2021 census, Telina had a population of 2,197 people.

== History ==
The suburb takes its name from a 1960s subdivision name.

== Demographics ==
In the 2016 census, Telina had a population of 2,143 people.

In the 2021 census, Telina had a population of 2,197 people.

== Education ==
There are no schools in Telina. The nearest government primary school is Kin Kora State School in neighbouring Kin Kora and the nearest government secondary school is Toolooa State High School in South Gladstone.

== Amenities ==
Gladstone Uniting Church is at 1 Uniting Place (corner of Dixon Drive, 23.8878°S 151.2591°E). It is part of the Central Queensland Presbytery of the Uniting Church in Australia.

There are a number of parks in the area:

- Bradford Park (23.8822°S 151.2542°E)
- Jupiter Park (23.8853°S 151.2569°E)
- Maroona Park (23.8820°S 151.2520°E)
- Mercury Park (23.8827°S 151.2569°E)
- Pluto Play Park (23.8861°S 151.2590°E)
- Sun Valley Park (23.8812°S 151.2569°E)
- Tondoon Botanic Gardens (23.8909°S 151.2568°E)
