= Calliope River Historical Village =

Historical Australian village

Coordinates: 23.9591°S 151.1557°E

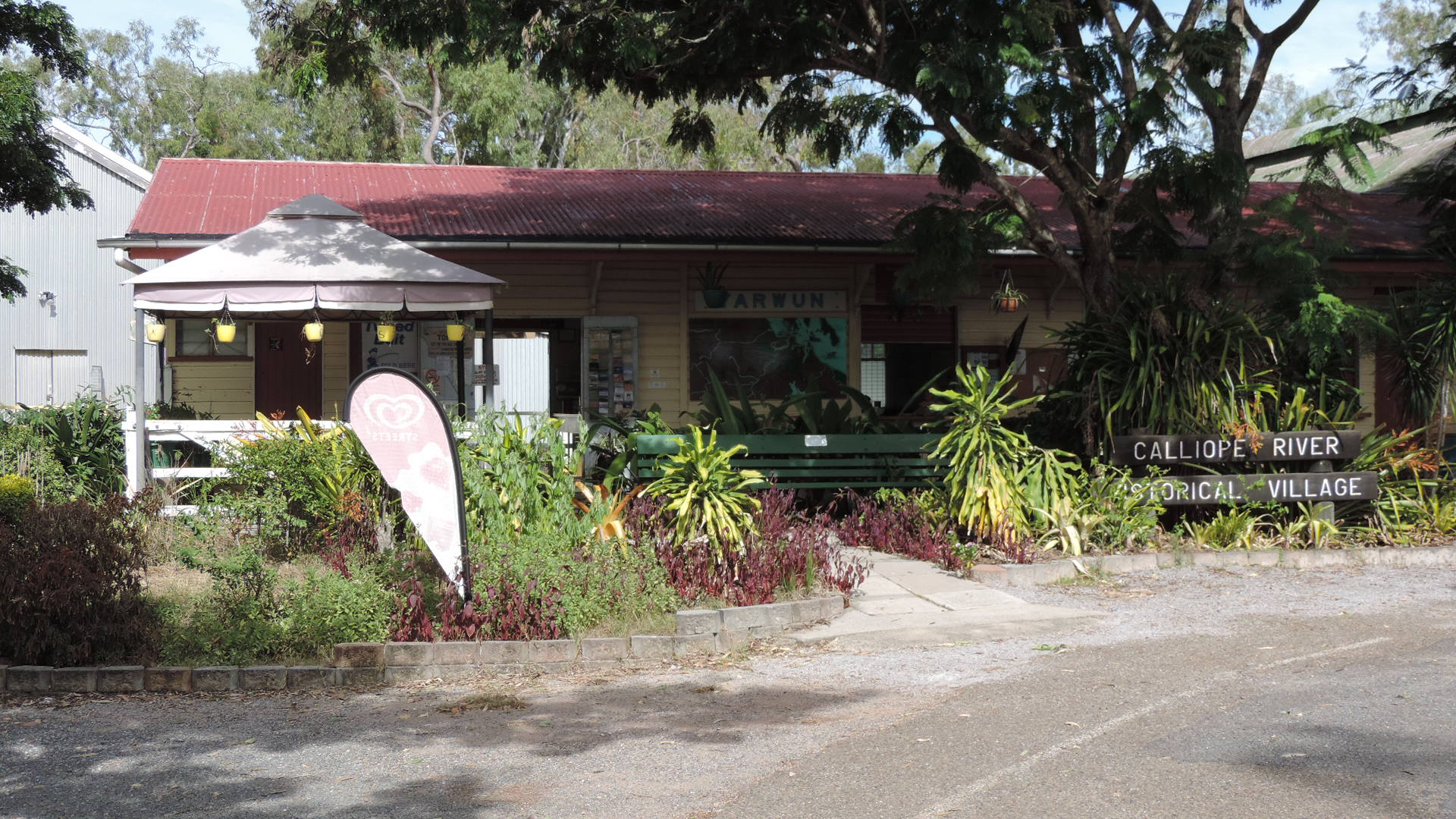
Village Kiosk (formerly Yarwun Railway Station), 2014

The Calliope River Historical Village is an open-air museum at 50951 Bruce Highway (but accessed from the side road known as Old Bruce Highway) beside the Calliope River in River Ranch in the Gladstone Region, Queensland, Australia. It is operated by the Port Curtis Historical Society.

== History ==
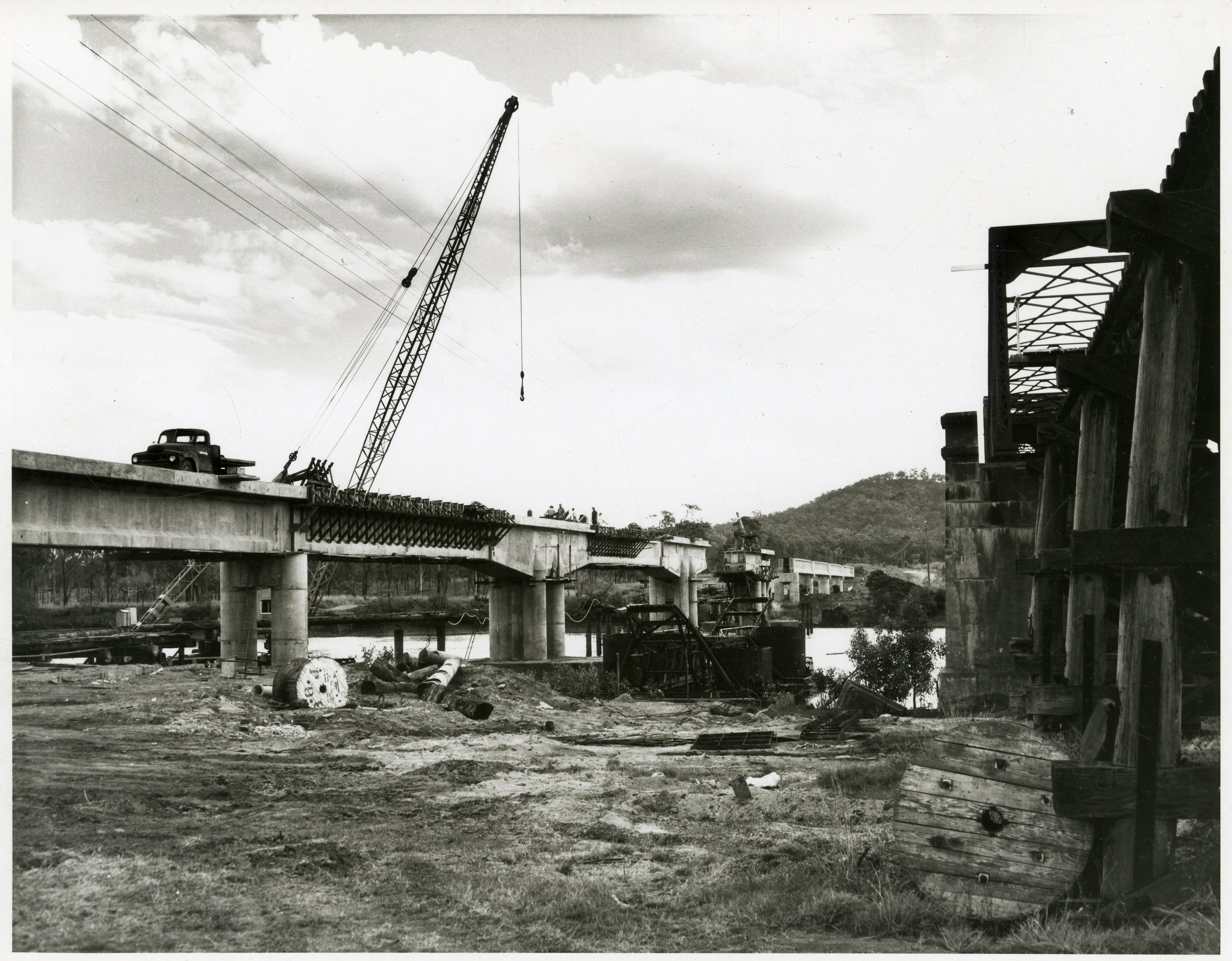
New Calliope River Bridge with old bridge on right, 1970

The centenary celebrations of the Shire of Calliope in 1979 created a collection of historic material, which led to the establishment of the Port Curtis Historical Society. As a new bridge was being constructed for the Bruce Highway to cross the Calliope River, the diversion of the highway to the new bridge created a parcel of land that the shire proposed to use as a historical village. Following site works, the village commenced operation in 1983 with the arrival of the first building, the Ambrose railway station.

== Collection ==
The museum comprises a number of historic buildings from the district which have been relocated to the historical village. Many of the buildings contain exhibits of everyday life and railway history.

The Raglan Memorial Hall was built in about 1932 and was used for dances until 1990, after which it stood idle. It was relocated to the village in March 2002 and officially re-opened by George Creed, the mayor of Calliope Shire.

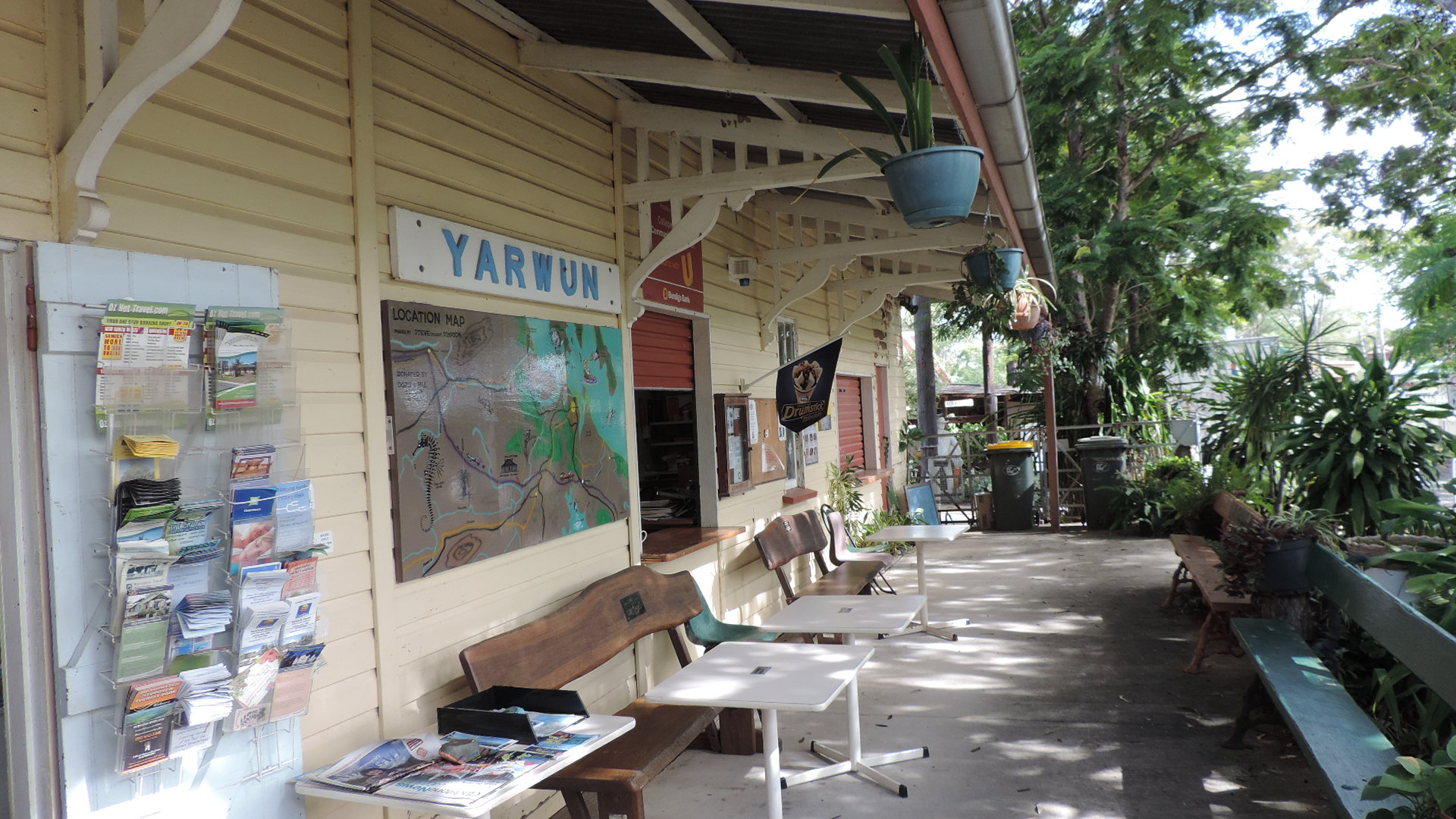
Village Kiosk (formerly Yarwun Railway Station), 2014

Yarwun railway station was relocated to the village and was re-opened in June 2003 as the ticket office and kiosk.

A wooden railway carriage (No. 1353) was built in Ipswich in the early 1940s. It was used on many routes including the Sunshine Mail that ran from Brisbane to Cairns (which was superseded by the Sunlander in the 1960s). Having become surplus to requirements for passenger transport, Queensland Rail had it transported to the village on 1 June 1989 where it serves as a tourist information centre.

== Historical survey monument ==
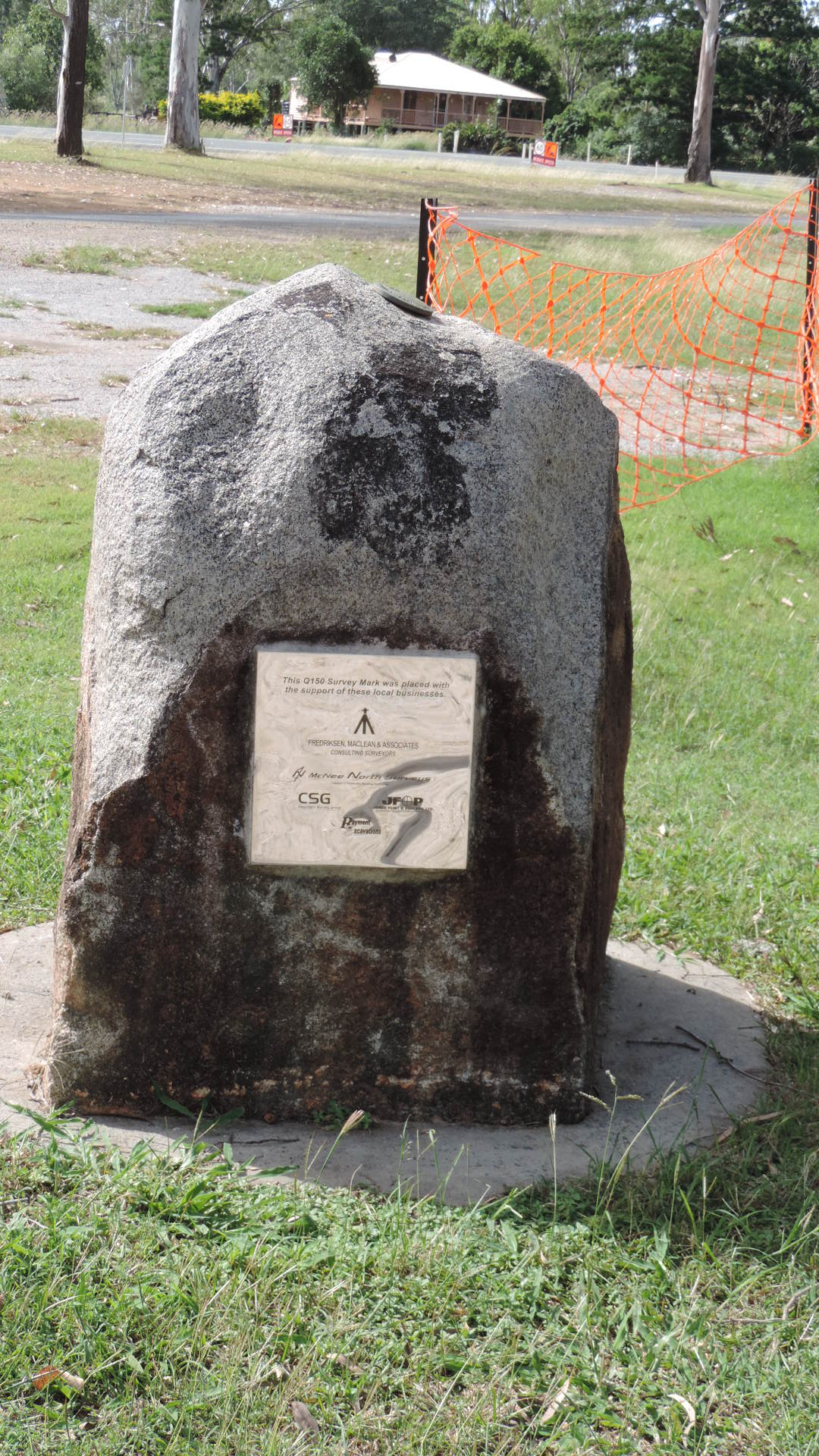
Q150 Survey Mark at Calliope River Historical Village, 2014

Although not part of the historical village, immediately outside its entrance is one of the Q150 historical survey makers placed by the Surveying and Spatial Sciences Institute in 2009. This monument commemorates Francis Peter MacCabe, the first surveyor of Gladstone. MacCabe was appointed by the Government of New South Wales to take a surveying party to the Port Curtis area to establish a settlement in 1853.
