= Sun Valley, Queensland =

Sun Valley
- Suburb
- Interactive map of Sun Valley
- Coordinates: 23.8752°S 151.2591°E
- Country: Australia
- State: Queensland
- City: Gladstone
- LGA: Gladstone Region
- Location: 4.4 km (2.7 mi) S of Gladstone CBD; 111 km (69 mi) SE of Rockhampton; 534 km (332 mi) NNW of Brisbane

Government
  - State electorate: Gladstone
  - Federal division: Flynn

Area
  - Total: 1.1 km^{2} (0.42 sq mi)

Population
  - Total: 1,296 (2021 census)
  - Density: 1,180/km^{2} (3,050/sq mi)
- Time zone: UTC+10:00 (AEST)
- Postcode: 4680
Suburbs around Sun Valley
| West Gladstone | West Gladstone | South Gladstone |
| Kin Kora | Sun Valley | South Gladstone |
| Telina | Toolooa | Toolooa |

Sun Valley is a suburb of Gladstone in the Gladstone Region, Queensland, Australia. In the 2021 census, Sun Valley had a population of 1,296 people.

== History ==
The name of the suburb was chosen by the property developer in the early 1960s.

Gladstone Christian Community School opened as a primary school in 1985. In 1993, it added a pre-school program. In 1998, the school was renamed Trinity College when it also offered secondary schooling to Year 10. In 2012, it added a kindergarten program. In 2023, it expanded to offer secondary schooling to Year 12.

== Demographics ==
In the 2016 census, Sun Valley had a population of 1,270 people.

In the 2021 census, Sun Valley had a population of 1,296 people.

== Education ==
Trinity College Gladstone is a private primary and secondary (Kindergarten to Year 12) school at 4 Archer Street (23.8715°S 151.2567°E). It is operated by the Gladstone Baptist Church.

There are no government schools in Sun Valley. The nearest government primary school is Kin Kora State School in neighbouring Kin Kora. The nearest government secondary school is Toolooa State High School in South Gladstone to the north-east.

== Amenities ==
There are a number of parks in the area:

- Boles Street Park (23.8690°S 151.2549°E)
- Maroona Park (23.8804°S 151.2535°E)
- Sun Valley Park (23.8812°S 151.2569°E)
- Tigalee Park (23.8789°S 151.2573°E)
