= Francis MacCabe =

Francis Peter MacCabe (1817 – 27 June 1897) was a surveyor in the colony of New South Wales (later a state of Australia) in the 19th century. He surveyed and mapped the lower reaches of the Murrumbidgee, Darling and Murray Rivers in New South Wales.

== Early life ==
MacCabe was born in Dublin in 1817. His parents were Dr James and Margaret (née Russell) MacCabe. He trained as a surveyor with the Ordnance Survey of Ireland and migrated to New South Wales in 1841 at the age of 24 on the ship Florentia.

== Surveying career ==
MacCabe worked with a team of assistants and convict labour surveying the rivers of the Murray Darling Basin between 1848 and 1852, including laying out the town of Balranald in 1849. MacCabe's surveys of these rivers made use of communication with the local Aboriginal Australians, and recorded up to 6–8 native placenames per mile of river.

MacCabe was working in the Wollongong area in early 1853 when he met Jane Osborne. They married at St Luke's church at Brownsville on 28 November 1855. They had 14 children. MacCabe left the Department of Surveyors in 1856 to manage a mine near the "Russell Vale" house that the couple had built when they married. In later life, the MacCabe family retired to Bowral, where he died on 27 June 1897.

MacCabe also explored and surveyed the Port Curtis district around what is now Gladstone in Queensland, at the request of Sir Thomas Mitchell. This survey took a total of 27 months from June 1853.

== Later life ==
MacCabe died at his residence, "Eltham," Merrigang Street, Bowral, New South Wales on Sunday morning 27 June 1897, following an illness of three years' duration. For the last nine months of his life, he resided in Bowral. He was buried in Corrimal Cemetery at Illawarra on Monday 28 June 1897.

== Legacy ==
MacCabe Corner is the point at which the borders of the states of South Australia, Victoria and New South Wales meet, and was named after Francis MacCabe.

On Sunday 22 June 2003 a memorial cairn to Francis MacCabe was unveiled in Friend Park in Gladstone by the Mayor of Gladstone Peter Corones.

As part of the Q150 celebrations in Queensland in 2009, the Surveying and Spatial Sciences Institute placed a Q150 survey marker at the Calliope River Historical Village (23°57′34.71″S 151°09′06.26″E) to commemorate MacCabe and his surveys of Gladstone and surrounding areas.

The Wollongong suburb of Russell Vale arose from the subdivision of his Russell Vale estate; the house itself was demolished in 1966.
