= Calliope River =

Calliope
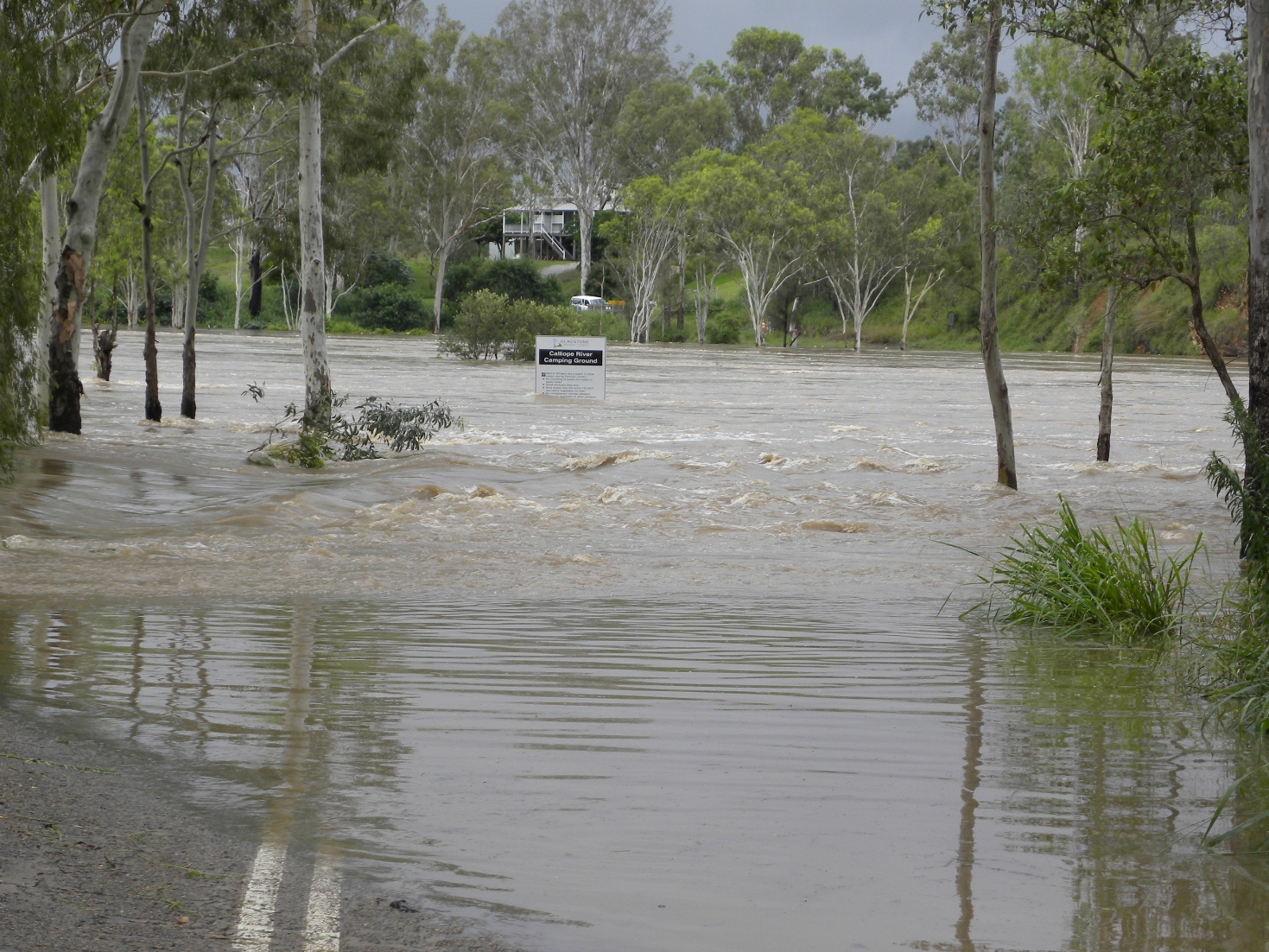
- Calliope River in flood, December 2010

- Location of Calliope River mouth in Queensland

Location
- Country: Australia
- State: Queensland
- Region: Central Queensland
- City: Calliope

Physical characteristics
- Source: Calliope Range
  - location: below Mount Cedric
  - coordinates: 23°58′38″S 150°43′06″E
  - elevation: 182 m (597 ft)
- Mouth: Port Curtis, Coral Sea
  - location: north of Gladstone
  - coordinates: 23°49′21″S 151°13′04″E
  - elevation: 0 m (0 ft)
- Length: 98 km (61 mi)
- Basin size: 2,241 km^{2} (865 sq mi)

Basin features
- Tributaries
  - left: Alma Creek, Harper Creek, Alarm Creek, Sandy Creek (Queensland), Larcom Creek, Boundary Creek (Queensland), Gravel Creek
  - right: Maxwelton Creek, Oaky Creek (Queensland), Sheep Station Creek, Double Creek

The Calliope River is a river in Central Queensland, Australia.

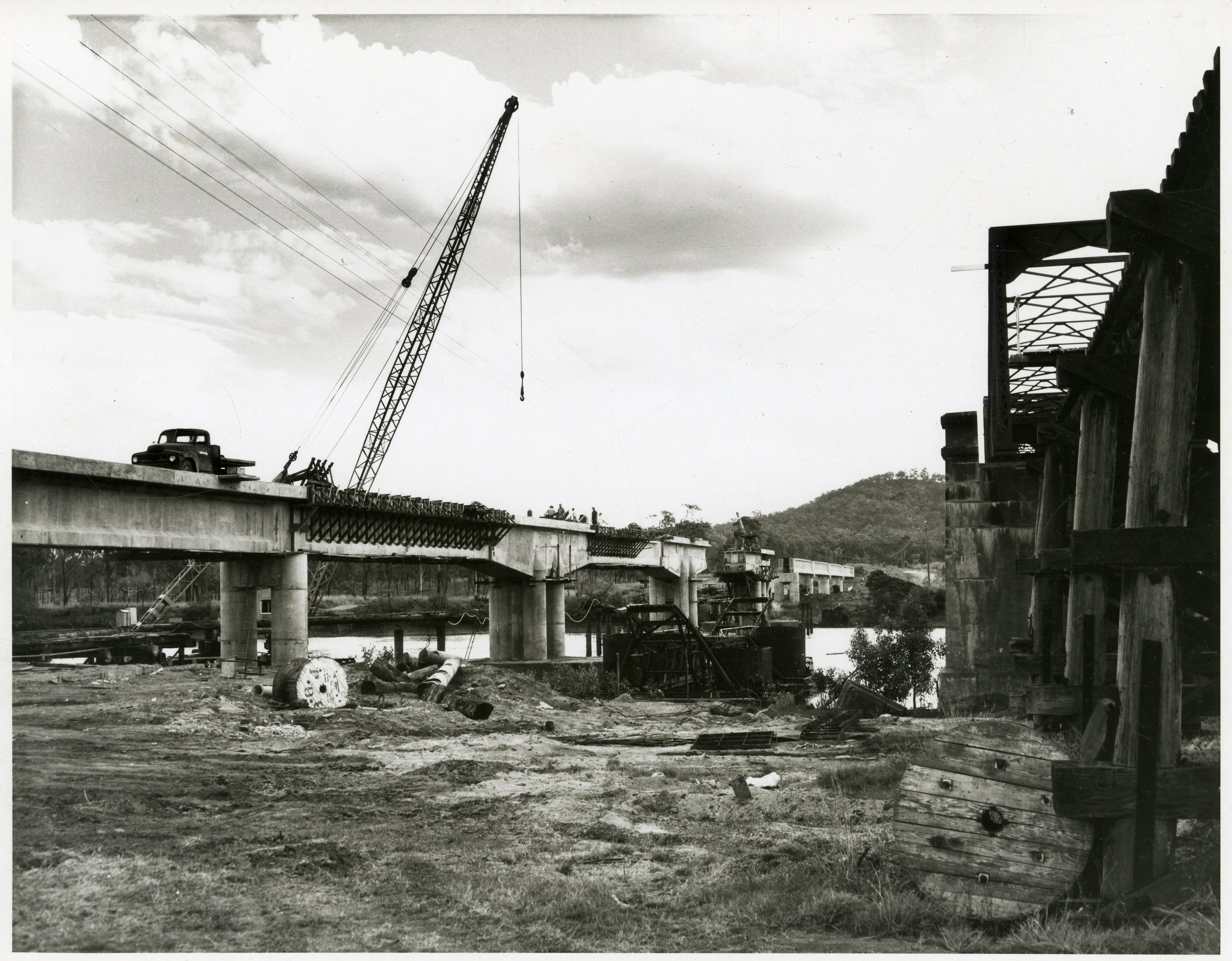
New Calliope River Bridge with old bridge on right, 1970

The river rises in the Calliope Range inland from the industrial port city of Gladstone, flows past the town of Calliope, before emptying into the Pacific Ocean just north of Gladstone. River length is 98 kilometres (61 mi), with a catchment area of 2,241 square kilometres (865 sq mi).

Circa 1970, a new bridge was constructed over the Calliope River.

Oaky, Paddock and Larcom Creeks are the main tributaries of the river. The major industry in the river area is the raising of beef cattle. Like most sub tropical and tropical estuaries, the waters of the river may contain box jellyfish for many kilometres upstream. This venomous, marine animal poses a threat to swimmers.

The Calliope River Historical Village is located beside the Calliope River on the Old Bruce Highway at River Ranch, adjacent to the Bruce Highway.

== See also ==
- List of rivers of Australia § Queensland
