= Yarwun, Queensland =

Yarwun
- Town
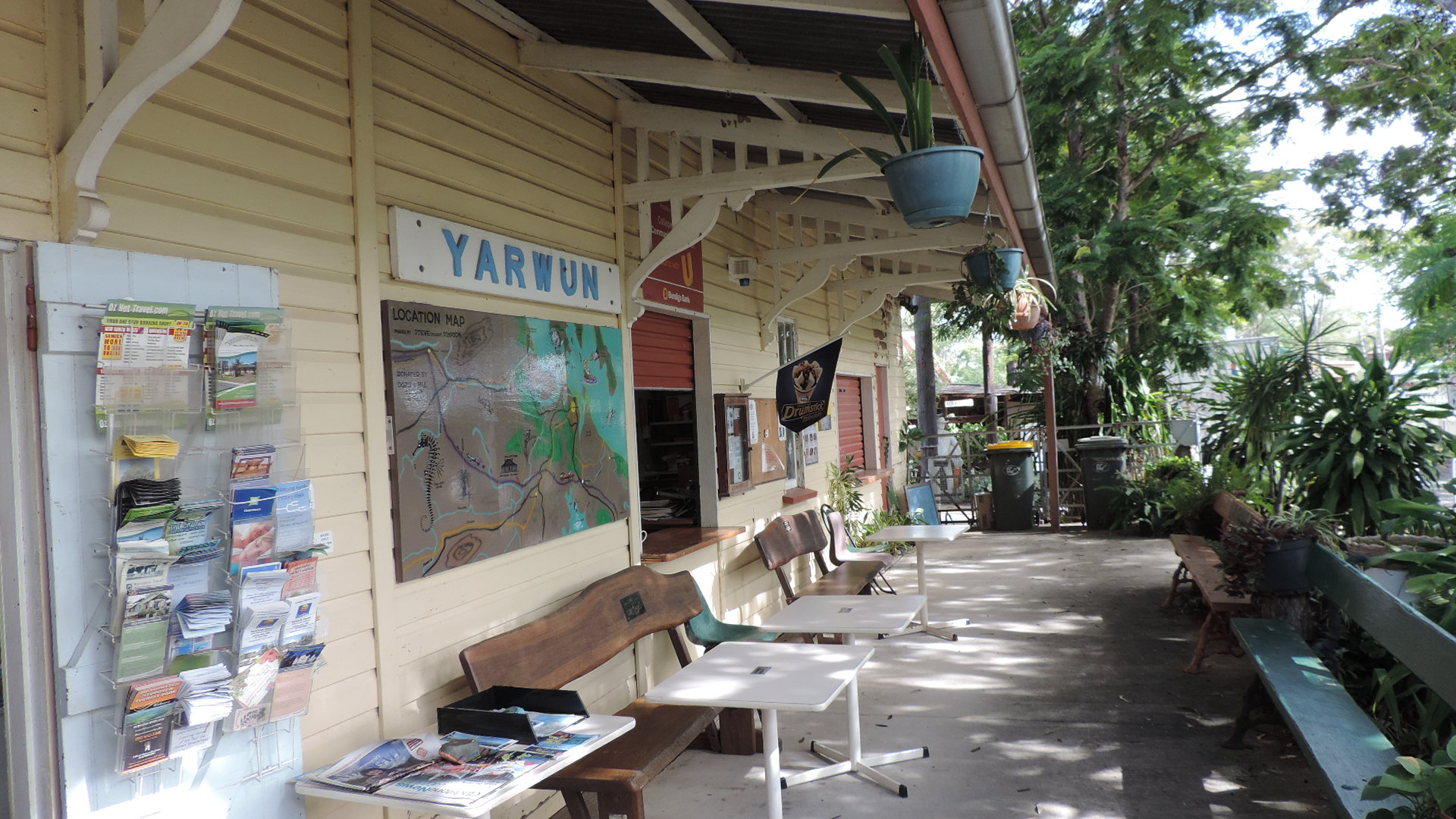
- Former Yarwun railway station (now at Calliope River Historical Village), 2014

- Interactive map of Yarwun
- Coordinates: 23.8456°S 151.1291°E
- Country: Australia
- State: Queensland
- LGA: Gladstone Region
- Location: 14.8 km (9.2 mi) NW of Gladstone CBD; 99.3 km (61.7 mi) SE of Rockhampton; 534 km (332 mi) NNW of Brisbane

Government
  - State electorate: Gladstone
  - Federal division: Flynn

Area
  - Total: 53.6 km^{2} (20.7 sq mi)

Population
  - Total: 89 (2021 census)
  - Density: 1.660/km^{2} (4.301/sq mi)
- Time zone: UTC+10:00 (AEST)
- Postcode: 4694
Localities around Yarwun
Targinnie	Targinnie	Curtis Island
Targinnie	Yarwun	Callemondah
Aldoga	West Stowe	Byellee

Yarwun is a rural town and coastal locality in the Gladstone Region, Queensland, Australia. In the 2021 census, the locality of Yarwun had a population of 89 people.

== Geography ==
The North Coast railway line enters the locality from the south-west (Byellee), passes to the north of the town, and then exits to the south-east (Aldoga). The locality is served by three railway stations, one on the main railway line and two on branch lines servicing major industry sites:

- Yarwun railway station on the main railway line (23.8446°S 151.1131°E)
- Fishermans Landing railway station on a branch line (23.7973°S 151.1549°E)
- Comalco railway station on a branch line (23.8344°S 151.1530°E)

The Gladstone–Mount Larcom Road runs through from east to south-west.

The terrain ranges from 0 to 320 metres (0 to 1,050 ft) above sea level; there are no named peaks.

== History ==
Yarwun Provisional School opened on 5 June 1906. It became Yarwun State School on 1 January 1909. The school was relocated to the centre of town in the late 1990s in a land swap with Queensland Rail as part of the straightening and duplication of the North Coast railway line.

The Yarwun-Targinnie Co-operative Association was established in 1924 to market locally-grown fruit. The district was well known for its pawpaws. In 1963 the Co-op established a store at 60 Butler Street to provide goods needed for fruit production, such as timber cases. Later the store expanded to general goods for the community and postal services.

In June 2003, the Yarwun railway station was relocated to the Calliope River Historical Village as its ticket office and kiosk.

In March 2005, Rio Tinto Alcan opened an alumina refinery in Yarwun. Bauxite from Weipa is processed by the Bayer process into alumina. The refinery was expanded in 2012 including a 160 megawatt co-generation facility, which converts heat into electricity.

== Demographics ==
In the 2011 census, the locality of Yarwun had a population of 239 people.

In the 2016 census, the locality of Yarwun had a population of 119 people.

In the 2021 census, the locality of Yarwun had a population of 89 people.

== Heritage listings ==
Yarwun has one heritage-listed site:

- Yarwun-Targinnie Co-op store, 60 Butler Street

== Economy ==
The alumina refinery is capable of producing 3.4 million tonnes of alumina each year and employs over 700 people.

Orica operates an ammonium nitrate plant at Reid Road; it produces over 500,000 tonnes per year for use in the mining industry in Australia and overseas. It operates a raw material import facility at Fisherman's Landing, 5 kilometres (3.1 mi) north of the Reid Road plant, from which the raw materials are delivered to the plant by underground pipeline. Orica has 200 employees and 100 contractors working at Yarwun.

== Education ==
Yarwun State School is a government primary (Prep-6) school for boys and girls at 35 Butler Street (23.8467°S 151.1260°E). In 2013, the school had 52 students in 3 multi-age classes with 6 teachers (4 full-time equivalent). In 2018, the school had an enrolment of 33 students with 4 teachers (3 full-time equivalent) and 5 non-teaching staff (3 full-time equivalent).

There is no secondary school in Yarwun. The nearest government secondary schools are Gladstone State High School (to Year 12) in West Gladstone to the south-east and Mount Larcom State School (to Year 10) in Mount Larcom to the west.

== Facilities ==
Yarwun Water Treatment Plant is at 21 & 87 Reid Road (23.8368°S 151.1706°E). It is operated by the Gladstone Regional Council.
