= Kin Kora, Queensland =

Kin Kora
- Suburb
- Interactive map of Kin Kora
- Coordinates: 23.8786°S 151.2463°E
- Country: Australia
- State: Queensland
- City: Gladstone
- LGA: Gladstone Region
- Location: 5.4 km (3.4 mi) SW of South Gladstone; 5.7 km (3.5 mi) S of Gladstone CBD; 110 km (68 mi) SE of Rockhampton; 511 km (318 mi) NNW of Brisbane

Government
  - State electorate: Gladstone
  - Federal division: Flynn

Area
  - Total: 1.9 km^{2} (0.73 sq mi)

Population
  - Total: 2,396 (2021 census)
  - Density: 1,260/km^{2} (3,270/sq mi)
- Time zone: UTC+10:00 (AEST)
- Postcode: 4680
Suburbs around Kin Kora
Clinton	West Gladstone	West Gladstone
New Auckland	Kin Kora	Sun Valley
New Auckland	Telina	Telina

Kin Kora is a suburb of Gladstone in the Gladstone Region, Queensland, Australia. In the 2021 census, Kin Kora had a population of 2,396 people.

== History ==
The suburb takes its name from Kin Kora Creek, which was in turn named in about 1853 by Dublin-born surveyor Francis Peter MacCabe with the traditional Irish name for the stronghold of the King of Ireland, Brian Boru.

Kin Kora State School opened on 9 October 1981.

== Demographics ==
In the 2011 census, Kin Kora had a population of 2,686 people.

In the 2016 census, Kin Kora had a population of 2,582 people.

In the 2021 census, Kin Kora had a population of 2,396 people.

== Education ==
Kin Kora State School is a government primary (Prep-6) school for boys and girls at 43 Hibiscus Avenue (23.8781°S 151.2535°E). In 2013, the school had 873 students with 55 teachers (49 full-time equivalent). In 2018, the school had an enrolment of 771 students with 58 teachers (50 full-time equivalent) and 24 non-teaching staff (17 full-time equivalent). It includes a special education program.

There is no secondary school in Kin Kora. The nearest government secondary school is Toolooa State High School in South Gladstone to the north-east.

== Amenities ==
The Windmill Centre is a shopping centre at 216-226 Philip Street (23.8709°S 151.2411°E).

Kin Kora C & K Community Kindergarten is at 84 Sun Valley Road (23.8800°S 151.2516°E) adjacent to the Kin Kora State School.

Gladstone Golf Club is an 18-hole golf course at 1 Hickory Avenue (23.8745°S 151.2435°E).

There are a number of parks in the area, including:

- Cypress Way Park (23.8761°S 151.2528°E)
- Maroona Park (23.8816°S 151.2523°E)
- Toonee Park (23.8795°S 151.2448°E)
