= Trotter Creek, Queensland =

Trotter Creek
- Suburb
- Interactive map of Trotter Creek
- Coordinates: 23.6919°S 150.3786°E
- Country: Australia
- State: Queensland
- LGA: Rockhampton Region
- Location: 6.5 km (4.0 mi) SW of Mount Morgan; 44.1 km (27.4 mi) SSW of Rockhampton CBD; 663 km (412 mi) NNW of Brisbane

Government
  - State electorate: Mirani
  - Federal division: Flynn

Area
  - Total: 18.4 km^{2} (7.1 sq mi)

Population
  - Total: 12 (2021 census)
  - Density: 0.652/km^{2} (1.69/sq mi)
- Time zone: UTC+10:00 (AEST)
- Postcode: 4714
Suburbs around Trotter Creek
Boulder Creek	Horse Creek	Hamilton Creek
Boulder Creek	Trotter Creek	Nine Mile Creek
Walmul	Walmul	Nine Mile Creek

Trotter Creek is a rural locality in the Rockhampton Region, Queensland, Australia. In the 2021 census, Trotter Creek had a population of 12 people.

== Geography ==
The Dee River enters the locality from the north-west (Boulder Creek / Horse Creek) and forms the north-western, western, south-western boundaries of the locality, before exiting to the south-west (Walmul).

The Burnett Highway enters the locality from the north-east (Hamilton Creek), forming the part of the eastern boundary of the locality, before exiting to the south-east (Nine Mile Creek), but returns to form part of the southern boundary of the locality before exiting to the south (Walmul).

The land use is predominantly grazing on native vegetation.

== History ==
The former Dawson Valley railway line passed through the locality, running just to the east of the Dee River. The locality was served by:

- Ulogie railway station (23.6725°S 150.3706°E)
- Muranu railway station (23.685°S 150.3544°E)

== Demographics ==
In the 2016 census, Trotter Creek had a population of 10 people.

In the 2021 census, Trotter Creek had a population of 12 people.

== Education ==
There are no schools in Trotter Creek. The nearest government primary and secondary schools are Mount Morgan Central State School and Mount Morgan State High School, both in Mount Morgan to the north.
