= Boulder Creek, Queensland =

Boulder Creek
- Suburb
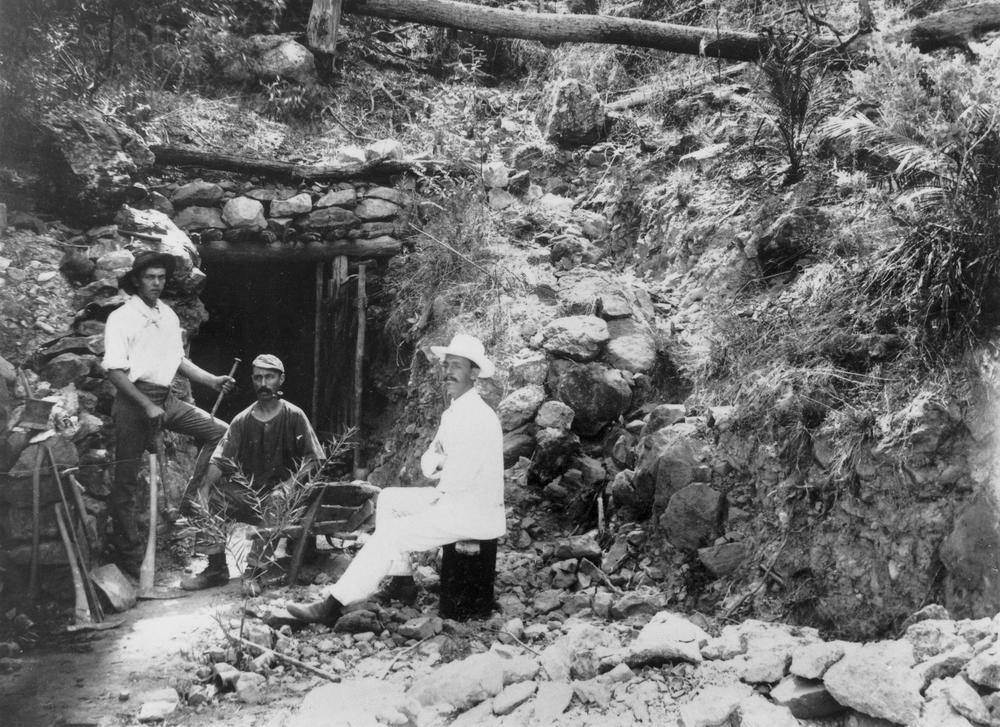
- Miners outside a mine shaft at Mount Victoria, circa 1892

- Interactive map of Boulder Creek
- Coordinates: 23.6719°S 150.3158°E
- Country: Australia
- State: Queensland
- LGA: Rockhampton Region
- Location: 7.4 km (4.6 mi) SW of Mount Morgan; 45.4 km (28.2 mi) SSW of Rockhampton; 661 km (411 mi) NNW of Brisbane

Government
  - State electorate: Mirani
  - Federal division: Flynn

Area
  - Total: 64.4 km^{2} (24.9 sq mi)

Population
  - Total: 13 (2021 census)
  - Density: 0.202/km^{2} (0.523/sq mi)
- Time zone: UTC+10:00 (AEST)
- Postcode: 4714
Suburbs around Boulder Creek
Bushley	Stanwell	The Mine; Mount Morgan
Westwood	Boulder Creek	Horse Creek; Trotter Creek
Oakey Creek	Oakey Creek	Walmul

Boulder Creek is a rural locality in the Rockhampton Region, Queensland, Australia. In the 2021 census, Boulder Creek had a population of 13 people.

== Geography ==
The Dee River forms the eastern boundary of the locality. The terrain is mountainous with named peaks of Mount Victoria (23.66238°S 150.35598°E) at 420 metres (1,380 ft) and Mount Battery (23.6699°S 150.3374°E) at 483 metres (1,585 ft). The land is mostly undeveloped.

The watercourse Boulder Creek (after which the locality is presumably named) rises in the north of the locality and flows to the south-east of the locality where it becomes a tributary to the Dee River within the North East Coast drainage basin.

The Mount Victoria gold field is located within the locality at 23.654°S 150.336°E. There is a current mining lease for the site.

== History ==
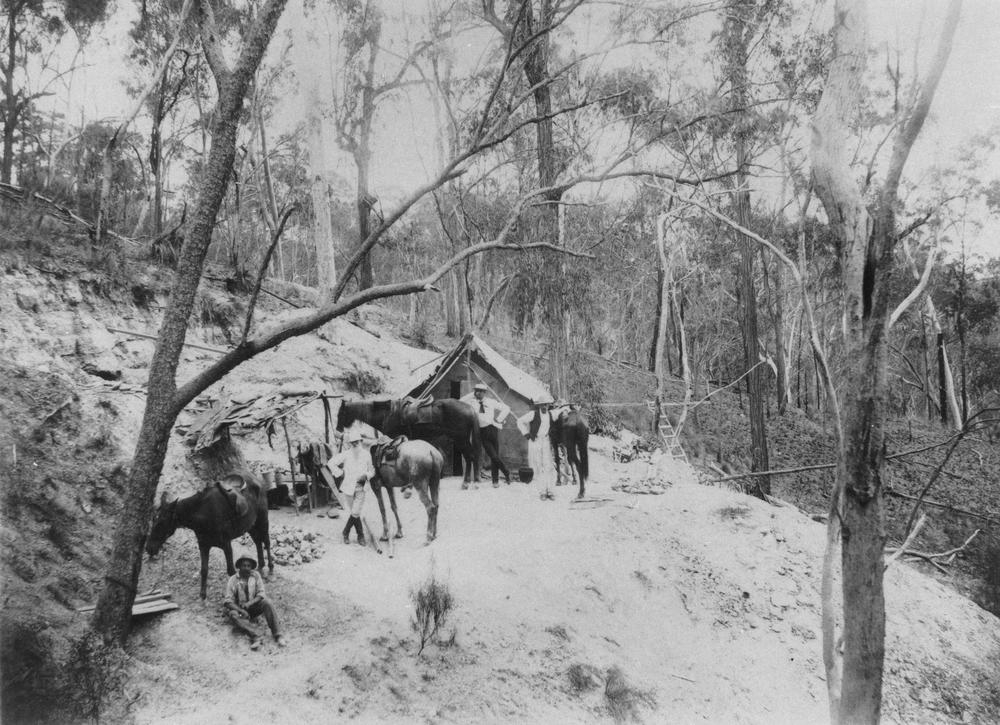
Mining camp at Mount Victoria, circa 1892

The Mount Victoria mine was active in the 1880 and 1890s.

Mount Victoria Provisional School opened in 1904. On 1 January 1909, it became Mount Victoria State School. It had low student numbers and closed in 1914. The school was at approx 23.64705°S 150.33535°E.

== Demographics ==
In the 2016 census, Boulder Creek had a population of 12 people.

In the 2021 census, Boulder Creek had a population of 13 people.

== Education ==
There are no schools in Boulder Creek. The nearest government primary and secondary schools are Mount Morgan Central State School and Mount Morgan State High School, both in neighbouring Mount Morgan to the north-east.
