= Oakey Creek, Queensland =

Oakey Creek
- Suburb
- Interactive map of Oakey Creek
- Coordinates: 23.7291°S 150.3161°E
- Country: Australia
- State: Queensland
- LGA: Rockhampton Region
- Location: 16.1 km (10.0 mi) SSE of Mount Morgan; 53.5 km (33.2 mi) SW of Rockhampton CBD; 659 km (409 mi) NNW of Brisbane

Government
  - State electorate: Mirani
  - Federal division: Flynn

Area
  - Total: 55.6 km^{2} (21.5 sq mi)

Population
  - Total: 12 (2021 census)
  - Density: 0.216/km^{2} (0.559/sq mi)
- Time zone: UTC+10:00 (AEST)
- Postcode: 4714
Suburbs around Oakey Creek
| Westwood | Boulder Creek | Walmul |
| Westwood | Oakey Creek | Fletcher Creek |
| Westwood | Wura | Fletcher Creek |

Oakey Creek is a rural locality in the Rockhampton Region, Queensland, Australia. In the 2021 census, Oakey Creek had a population of 12 people.

== Geography ==
The Burnett Highway enters the locality from the north-east (Walmul) and exits to the south (Wura).

== History ==
Konara State School opened in 1919. It closed in 1927. It was north of the Konara railway station, between the Dawson Valley railway line and the Dee River, just south of the confluence with Fletcher Creek (approx 23.7633°S 150.36009°E).

== Demographics ==
In the 2016 census, Oakey Creek had "no people or a very low population".

In the 2021 census, Oakey Creek had a population of 12 people.

== Heritage listings ==
Oakey Creek has the following heritage-listed sites:

- remains of the Adolphus William Copper Smelter

== Education ==
There are no schools in Oakey Creek. The nearest government primary and secondary schools are Mount Morgan Central State School and Mount Morgan State High School, both in Mount Morgan to the north-east.
