= Hamilton Creek, Queensland =

Hamilton Creek
- Suburb
- Interactive map of Hamilton Creek
- Coordinates: 23.6727°S 150.3961°E
- Country: Australia
- State: Queensland
- LGA: Rockhampton Region
- Location: 4.6 km (2.9 mi) S of Mount Morgan; 42.2 km (26.2 mi) SE of Rockhampton; 637 km (396 mi) NNW of Brisbane

Government
  - State electorate: Mirani
  - Federal division: Flynn

Area
  - Total: 2.1 km^{2} (0.81 sq mi)

Population
  - Total: 76 (2021 census)
  - Density: 36.2/km^{2} (93.7/sq mi)
- Time zone: UTC+10:00 (AEST)
- Postcode: 4714
Suburbs around Hamilton Creek
Horse Creek	Horse Creek	Limestone
Horse Creek	Hamilton Creek	Limestone
Trotter Creek	Trotter Creek	Nine Mile Creek

Hamilton Creek is a rural locality in the Rockhampton Region, Queensland, Australia. In the 2021 census, Hamilton Creek had a population of 76 people.

== Geography ==
The Burnett Highway runs through from north to south.

== History ==
Hamilton Creek Provisional School opened on 16 November 1908. On 1 January 1909, it became Hamilton Creek State School. It closed in 1972. It was at 50536 Burnett Highway (opposite Golf Links Road, 23.6746°S 150.4008°E).

== Demographics ==
In the 2016 census, Hamilton Creek had a population of 104 people.

In the 2021 census, Hamilton Creek had a population of 76 people.

== Education ==
There are no schools in Hamilton Creek. The nearest government primary and secondary schools are Mount Morgan Central State School and Mount Morgan State High School, both in Mount Morgan to the north.
