= Walmul, Queensland =

Walmul
- Suburb
- Interactive map of Walmul
- Coordinates: 23.7211°S 150.3658°E
- Country: Australia
- State: Queensland
- LGA: Rockhampton Region
- Location: 12.4 km (7.7 mi) SSW of Mount Morgan; 50.0 km (31.1 mi) SSW of Rockhampton; 675 km (419 mi) NNW of Brisbane

Government
  - State electorate: Mirani
  - Federal division: Flynn

Area
  - Total: 11.1 km^{2} (4.3 sq mi)

Population
  - Total: 21 (2021 census)
  - Density: 1.89/km^{2} (4.90/sq mi)
- Time zone: UTC+10:00 (AEST)
- Postcode: 4714
Suburbs around Walmul
Boulder Creek	Trotter Creek	Trotter Creek
Oakey Creek	Walmul	Nine Mile Creek
Oakey Creek	Fletcher Creek	Nine Mile Creek

Walmul is a rural locality in the Rockhampton Region, Queensland, Australia. In the 2021 census, Walmul had a population of 21 people.

== Geography ==
Walmul railway station is an abandoned railway station on the former Dawson Valley railway line (23.7254°S 150.3740°E).

== History ==
The locality takes its name from its former railway station, assigned on 18 November 1911. It is believed to be an Aboriginal word meaning koala.

Walmul State School opened in 1927. It closed in 1930.

== Demographics ==
In the 2016 census, Walmul had a population of 25 people.

In the 2021 census, Walmul had a population of 21 people.

== Education ==
There are no schools in Walmul. The nearest government primary and secondary schools are Mount Morgan Central State School and Mount Morgan State High School, both in Mount Morgan to the north.
