= Limestone, Queensland =

Limestone
- Suburb
- Interactive map of Limestone
- Coordinates: 23.6619°S 150.4288°E
- Country: Australia
- State: Queensland
- LGA: Rockhampton Region
- Location: 9.7 km (6.0 mi) ENE of Mount Morgan; 37.2 km (23.1 mi) SSW of Rockhampton; 653 km (406 mi) NNW of Brisbane

Government
  - State electorate: Mirani
  - Federal division: Flynn

Area
  - Total: 28.9 km^{2} (11.2 sq mi)

Population
  - Total: 0 (2021 census)
  - Density: 0.000/km^{2} (0.00/sq mi)
- Time zone: UTC+10:00 (AEST)
- Postcode: 4714
Suburbs around Limestone
Mount Morgan	Struck Oil	Bajool
Horse Creek	Limestone	Bajool
Hamilton Creek	Nine Mile Creek	Nine Mile Creek

Limestone is a rural locality in the Rockhampton Region, Queensland, Australia. In the 2021 census, Limestone had "no people or a very low population".

== History ==
Limestone Provisional School opened circa 1891 and closed circa 1896.

== Demographics ==
In the 2016 census, Limestone had a population of 7 people.

In the 2021 census, Limestone had "no people or a very low population".

== Education ==
There are no schools in Limestone. The nearest government primary and secondary schools are Mount Morgan Central State School and Mount Morgan State High School, both in neighbouring Mount Morgan to the west.
