= Horse Creek, Queensland =

Horse Creek
- Suburb
- Interactive map of Horse Creek
- Coordinates: 23.6675°S 150.3819°E
- Country: Australia
- State: Queensland
- LGA: Rockhampton Region
- Location: 3.4 km (2.1 mi) SW of Mount Morgan; 40.8 km (25.4 mi) SSW of Rockhampton CBD; 660 km (410 mi) NNW of Brisbane

Government
  - State electorate: Mirani
  - Federal division: Flynn

Area
  - Total: 4.0 km^{2} (1.5 sq mi)

Population
  - Total: 83 (2021 census)
  - Density: 20.8/km^{2} (53.7/sq mi)
- Time zone: UTC+10:00 (AEST)
- Postcode: 4714
Suburbs around Horse Creek
The Mine	Mount Morgan	Mount Morgan
Boulder Creek	Horse Creek	Limestone
Boulder Creek	Trotter Creek	Hamilton Creek

Horse Creek is a rural locality in the Rockhampton Region, Queensland, Australia. In the 2021 census, Horse Creek had a population of 83.

== Geography ==
The Dee River forms part of the western boundary.

The Burnett Highway runs through the eastern end.

== Demographics ==
In the 2016 census, Horse Creek had a population of 123 people.

In the 2021 census, Horse Creek had a population of 83 people.

== Education ==
There are no schools in Horse Creek. The nearest government primary and secondary schools are Mount Morgan Central State School and Mount Morgan State High School, both in neighbouring Mount Morgan to the north.
