= Nine Mile Creek, Queensland =

Nine Mile Creek
- Suburb
- Interactive map of Nine Mile Creek
- Coordinates: 23.7222°S 150.4391°E
- Country: Australia
- State: Queensland
- LGA: Rockhampton Region
- Location: 8.3 km (5.2 mi) S of Mount Morgan; 46.0 km (28.6 mi) SSW of Rockhampton CBD; 665 km (413 mi) NNW of Brisbane

Government
  - State electorate: Mirani
  - Federal division: Flynn

Area
  - Total: 92.0 km^{2} (35.5 sq mi)

Population
  - Total: 23 (2021 census)
  - Density: 0.250/km^{2} (0.647/sq mi)
- Time zone: UTC+10:00 (AEST)
- Postcode: 4714
Suburbs around Nine Mile Creek
Hamilton Creek; Trotter Creek	Limestone	Bajool
Walmul	Nine Mile Creek	Bajool
Fletcher Creek	Fletcher Creek	Bajool

Nine Mile Creek is a rural locality in the Rockhampton Region, Queensland, Australia. In the 2021 census, Nine Mile Creek had a population of 23 people.

== Geography ==
Nine Mile Creek has the following mountains:

- Mount Dick (23.6908°S 150.4949°E), rising to 590 metres (1,940 ft) above sea level
- Mount Hoopbound (23.7598°S 150.4514°E) 535 metres (1,755 ft)

The land use is predominantly grazing on native vegetation.

== Demographics ==
In the 2016 census, Nine Mile Creek had a population of 17 people.

In the 2021 census, Nine Mile Creek had a population of 23 people.

== Education ==
There are no schools in Nine Mile Creek. The nearest government primary and secondary schools are Mount Morgan Central State School and Mount Morgan State High School, both in Mount Morgan to the north-west.
