= The Mine, Queensland =

The Mine
- Suburb
- Interactive map of The Mine
- Coordinates: 23.6308°S 150.3719°E
- Country: Australia
- State: Queensland
- LGA: Rockhampton Region
- Location: 2.6 km (1.6 mi) WSW of Mount Morgan; 40.3 km (25.0 mi) SSW of Rockhampton CBD; 128 km (80 mi) WNW of Gladstone; 659 km (409 mi) NNW of Brisbane

Government
  - State electorate: Mirani
  - Federal division: Flynn

Area
  - Total: 11.5 km^{2} (4.4 sq mi)

Population
  - Total: 23 (2021 census)
  - Density: 2.00/km^{2} (5.18/sq mi)
- Time zone: UTC+10:00 (AEST)
- Postcode: 4714
Suburbs around The Mine
Stanwell	Bouldercombe	Moongan
Stanwell	The Mine	Baree; Walterhall
Stanwell	Boulder Creek	Mount Morgan; Horse Creek

The Mine is a rural locality in the Rockhampton Region, Queensland, Australia. In the 2021 census, The Mine had a population of 23 people.

== Demographics ==
In the 2016 census, The Mine had a population of 47 people.

In the 2021 census, The Mine had a population of 23 people.

== Education ==
There are no schools in The Mine. The nearest government primary and secondary schools are Mount Morgan Central State School and Mount Morgan State High School, both in neighbouring Mount Morgan to the east.
