= Adolphus William Copper Smelter =

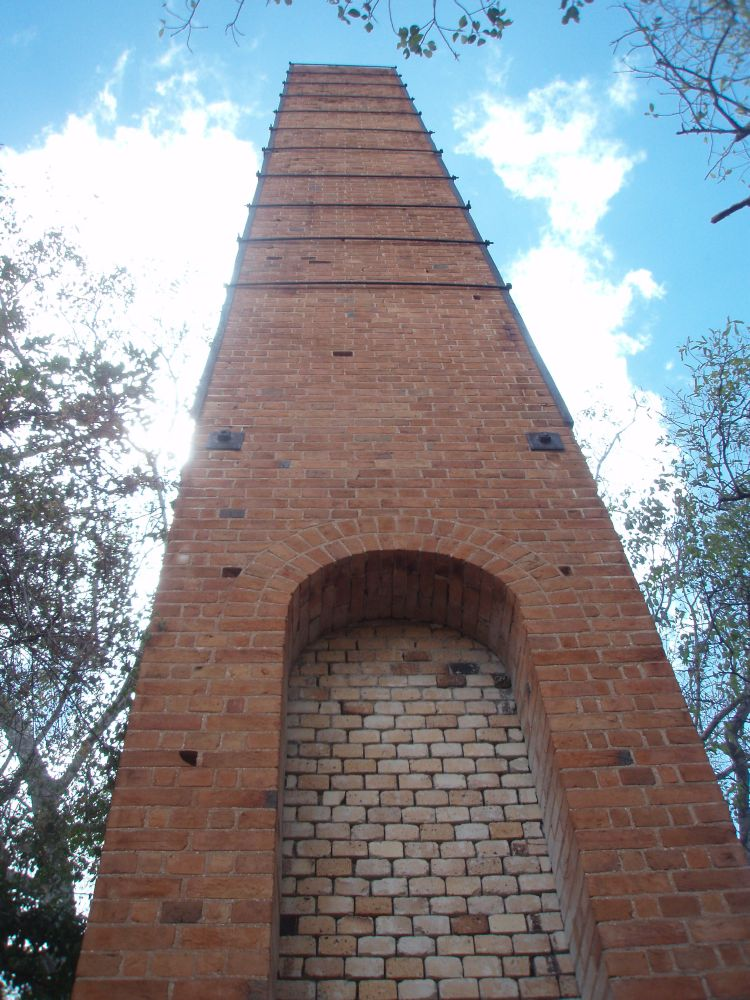
- Adolphus William Copper Smelter chimney, 2009

- Location within Queensland Location within Australia
- 23.7618°S 150.3046°E
- Location: Westwood and Oakey Creek, Rockhampton Region, Queensland, Australia

History
- Design period: 1870s–1890s (late 19th century)
- Built: 1874

Queensland Heritage Register
- Official name: Adolphus William Copper Smelter and Dee Township, Dee Copper Mine Smelter
- Type: archaeological
- Designated: 13 May 2011
- Reference no.: 700013
- Significant period: 1874–1876
- Significant components: slag pile/slag heap, chimney/chimney stack, furnace, artefact field, hut/shack, chimney/chimney stack, pathway/walkway, artefact field, hut/shack

Adolphus William Copper Smelter is a heritage-listed former copper smelter and associated mining camp at Westwood and Oakey Creek in Rockhampton Region, Queensland, Australia. It was built in 1874. It was added to the Queensland Heritage Register on 13 May 2011.

== History ==
The Adolphus William Copper Smelter, located 45 kilometres (28 mi) southwest of Rockhampton, was one of a number of small copper operations established in central Queensland during the boom-bust period in international copper prices in the early to mid 1870s. The smelter operated between 1874 and 1876. The associated Adolphus William Copper Mine had a fluctuating history, being worked on and off between 1872 and the late 1870s, (possibly as late as 1879) then again in the early and mid 20th century. Little information exists for the associated Dee Township, which is believed to have been occupied during the 1870s boom period and was quickly abandoned when the mine and smelter closed for the first time. The last copper mining occurred in the area in 1940, and in 1942, the copper deposits in the area were declared unprofitable.

Copper was the first metal commercially mined in Australia, commencing in South Australia in 1844. In Queensland, the Peak Downs Copper Mine at Copperfield (now part of Clermont) in Central Queensland, opened in 1862. It was Queensland's first successful copper mine and the first successful copper mine outside South Australia.

The early copper industry, like most Australian mining operations, always had to export its mineral products and was therefore at the mercy of international copper price fluctuations. A series of small copper mines and smelters were established in Queensland during a copper boom-bust period in the early-mid 1870s. These operations were established during a period of high international copper prices when the mineral was valued at as much as UK£95 per ton. The first mine established during this period was at Mount Perry, southwest of Bundaberg. A mineral freehold had been established at Mount Perry in 1870 and a "copper rush" soon followed. A smelter was erected in 1871 and its reverberatory furnaces were operating by 1872.

This "copper rush" and an extended period of high copper prices resulted in a rapid establishment of a number of additional copper mines and smelters in central and southern parts of Queensland. Operations commenced at Kariboe Creek, between Monto and Biloela in 1871 and Mount Orange southwest of Mackay in 1871. In southern Queensland, mining began at Mount Coora and Mount Clara to the west of Gympie in 1872 and Teebar northwest of Gympie in 1873.

Copper had been found close to Oaky Creek (sometimes also spelt Oakey Creek), southwest of Mount Morgan by William MacKinlay, head stockman of the pastoral run over the area Calliungal, held by Hugh Robinson. MacKinlay had walked the Dee Range, along the river and creeks, fossicking for gold, but instead found a copper lode. The year of actual discovery is not known, but rights to mine copper here were acquired by the Scottish Australian Mining Company in 1870. Samples of copper ore sent to Wales for assay proved the value of the ore. Mineral freeholds were taken up to cover the copper deposit which extended about two kilometres in length. The Adolphus William Copper Mine, located on the top of a steep slope north of Mackay Creek, southwest of Mount Morgan, opened in about 1872.

It is not clear when the nearby and associated Dee Township site was first occupied, but it is likely that it was utilised during the 1870s boom-bust period, and then quickly abandoned.

A smelter was constructed at Adolphus William in about 1874. Smelting is a process of extracting a metal from its ores by heating ores in a reducing environment such as a furnace. Smelting is a standard method for treating copper ores which are heated to melting point where the higher density copper metal is separated from the lighter ore. At the Adolphus William, two chimneys were built to provide the necessary draught for smelting ore with wood to fuel the furnace sourced from throughout the local area. Two small reverberatory furnaces were installed at the smelter. The reverberatory furnace was the predominant copper smelter technology in use in central Queensland and across Queensland until the 1890s, when the water-jacket blast furnace technology developed in the United States of America became more common.

The reverberatory furnace was a Welsh technology and was essentially a masonry hearth with a roof erected over it. The Welsh process happened to be very well suited to the rich carbonate ores that characterised the early copper discoveries. Finely crushed and concentrated copper ore is mixed with the flux (chemicals or other substances added to a load of ore and fuel) and spread on the hearth, under which an intense fire is lit in a firebox situated at one end of the furnace, allowing a flame to pass over the ore. Common practice from the period was to fire the furnace for up to twenty-four hours, following which the matte (the intermediate product of the smelting process consisting of 40–55% copper) and slag were extracted from separate openings and at different levels on the sides of the furnace.

Copper smelting in 1870s central Queensland was an experimental undertaking due to isolation from required materials, equipment, expertise and a need to adapt existing technologies to suit the local environmental and economic conditions. Smelter men who came to Queensland were more likely to rely on "craft" knowledge of smelting than on written instruction and would adapt their approaches to solve problems in personal and idiosyncratic ways.

Crucial for the durability and efficiency of reverberatory furnaces was construction by skilled bricklayers and good quality firebricks - both of which were in short supply in Australia at the time. The furnaces at Adolphus William were constructed from firebricks made in Cumbernauld, Dunbartonshire, Scotland by the Cumbernauld Fire-Clay Company.

The copper metal from the smelter was hauled on a government road built about 1874 to a rail head at Westwood for transport to Rockhampton. The first six tons of copper reached Rockhampton in December 1876. Production between 1875 and 1877 totalled 203 long tons (206 t) of copper from 1,790 long tons (1,820 t) of ore.

Most mines, smelters and associated settlements from the initial "copper rush" period closed down before the end of the same decade, as international copper prices fell to near UK£60 per ton in 1879. Copper prices continued to fall to a bottom of UK£40 per ton in 1886. Only top producers were able, to some extent, break the dependence on high prices. Flanagan's at Kariboe Creek and Great Blackall quickly ceased smelting in 1874, Mount Clara (and possibly Mount Coora as well) by 1875, and Mount Perry by 1877 (Mount Perry was revived again in the late 1880s). The Adolphus William Copper Mine, and probably the smelter, had closed by 1876 though one account suggests that the mine continued operations until 1879. By 1879 a weekly mail service to the area from Rockhampton had ceased and the site appears to have been deserted at this time.

A second copper boom occurred in the central and southern Queensland regions in the period 1897–1907, with mines and smelters established at places such as Sundown, Glassford Creek, Mount Hector, Mount Chalmers, Mount Cannindah, and at Mount Morgan. A number of these mines were taken over by overseas capital in this period. At the same time smelters were established in the northern region, notably at Mount Garnet, Chillagoe and Mount Molloy in the Mount Isa District.

The adjacent Adolphus William Copper Mine, then known as the Dee River Mine, was worked again in the early 20th century, until 1915. In 1917, 20.5 long tons (20.8 t) of ore were again mined from old dumps at the Adolphus William and again in 1918 a further 99 long tons (101 t) of ore were mined for a yield of 17 long tons (17 t) of copper. It is unclear when mining of copper at Dee River Mine finally ceased, though Mount Morgan Gold Mining Company Ltd took up three leases in the Dee River area in 1926; these did not proceed due to the company's liquidation. Its successors, Mount Morgan Limited and Morgan Mining and Industrial Co. Pty Ltd, also had leases and options over the area. The mine was again worked in 1940 and produced 2.4 long tons (2.4 t) of copper from 29.8 long tons (30.3 t) of ore which was smelted at Chillagoe.

A number of shafts were driven to the areas north and west of the smelter remains. These shafts included the "Little Blow", "Yellow Ore", "Big Blow", "No.1 Shaft", "Tunnel", "Sunday Places", and 'Morehead's Shaft'. All shafts were reportedly partially or completely collapsed by 1942. The mine area was heavily disturbed by subsequent prospecting (costeans and test cuts) during various attempts to rework the copper lodes in the area in 1917, 1927 and 1940. Due to the limited remains, degree of degradation, and extent of disturbance, the collapsed shaft remains are not considered included in this recommendation.

With an increased need for copper during World War II, the Dee River and old Adolphus William workings were again considered for re-mining, but it was concluded that mining would not appreciably increase the production of copper nor would it be profitable.

== Description ==
=== Smelter ===
The remains of the smelter are located on the western aspect and on the upper slope of a low hill in dry stony ridge country above Oaky Creek. The area surrounding the smelter ruins is infested with lantana and rubber vine, limiting visibility in places. The area has been heavily overgrazed and is continuing to degrade with evidence of severe topsoil erosion.

Components of the smelter include a largely intact brick chimney stack and associated brick rubble, a collapsed brick stack, two collapsed reverberatory furnaces, a slag pile, and scattered metal and other artefacts. A dry stone retaining wall flanks the western side (down slope) of the smelter site and is constructed from locally sourced stone and measures 0.8 - 1.0 metre (3 ft 3 in) in height.

The stack measures 16 metres (52 ft) in height and features a square based 1.8 by 1.8 metres (5 ft 11 in × 5 ft 11 in) stack design with a brick pedestal foundation measuring 2.0 by 2.0 metres (6 ft 7 in × 6 ft 7 in). The interior of the stack is made from imported yellow to orange-red Cumbernauld firebricks laid in a header bond arrangement. The exterior structure is made from locally made clay bricks (no makers mark or "frog" evident) arranged in a modified English bond coursework pattern.

The stack has been braced at set intervals from the top down to approximately half height. Angle iron is used and is formed by two pieces with short overlapping angle pieces at the join and is held in place with a looped and threaded rod. This bracing appears to be held in place by clamping to the stack fascia rather than direct attachment to the brickwork.

The lower half of the stack is braced internally with two sets of four heavy steel rods running horizontally through each side of the stack and protruding from the brickwork near each corner. Clamping plates are sited flush with the brickwork then packing/washers with square sided nuts are used to tighten the bracing against the brick work. These clamping plates have "AWCS" stamped onto each corner suggesting at least partial on-site manufacture in a blacksmith's or smelter workshop.

Other archaeological artefacts are found close by to the stack, including an iron crucible (carrying/lifting jig/frame) a post with large neat mortise work, suggesting a professional carpenter may have been employed to erect a timber building encompassing parts of the smelter works, and a slag pile/slope to the south. A fig tree, located adjacent to the intact chimney stack and affecting the brickworks, features historical graffiti.

The remains of the second brick chimney stack, which collapsed in 1954, are located to the east of the intact stack. This is now visible as a partially collapsed brick base, a brick pile and scatter of "Cumbernauld" and locally made bricks, and remnant structural timbers.

The remains of the reverberatory furnaces are in an advanced state of decay and are mostly collapsed. The furnaces are made with "Cumbernauld" firebricks and feature a large amount of slag build-up. These firebricks have also used to help keep the base brickwork intact. Iron beams, possibly from a local light rail track, have been rammed into the ground in certain places to help stabilise the furnaces. Fig tree and rubber vine are extensive in this area and are invading some elements of the brickwork and in other places helping to stabilise it.

The ruins of a small cottage interpreted as the smelter manager's cottage are located approximately 150 metres (490 ft) east and upslope from the intact chimney stack. The site is near the crest of the hill and features a brick floor or foundations, a brick chimney and ships tanks. The cottage measures approximately 6.2 metres (20 ft) long and 4.9 metres (16 ft) wide and was constructed of local bricks. The remaining in-situ elements are the foundations of the cottage and/or part of a brick floor. The lack of bricks scattered adjacent to the cottage suggests that parts may have been made from local timbers, or bricks were taken from the site and reused elsewhere.

A bottle tree located at the site of the manager's cottage features historical graffiti dating to the period of smelter operations. Engraved on the tree is "W.A. Mine 1874".

The cottage chimney measures 4.4 metres (14 ft) in height and has a 1.5 metres (4 ft 11 in) square base. Brickwork is stepped above 1.5 metres (4 ft 11 in). A ships tank (1.2 by 1.2 metres (3 ft 11 in × 3 ft 11 in) is located next to the cottage ruin. The tank has a circular access hole with a drop-in lid and was possibly used for water storage, possibly runoff from the cottage roof.

Located down slope and approximately 75–100 metres (246–328 ft) west-northwest of the cottage ruins is a scatter of metal, mostly scrap iron such as bolts, metal plating and sheeting, rail tracks and rail cut offs, and a crucible basket. This area has been tentatively interpreted as a "workshop" attached to the smelting operations. Material is spread across the slope for 50 metres (160 ft), with a brick scatter to the south, metal artefacts concentrated in the centre, and a brick stockpile (local and firebricks) situated at the northern end. Fragments of stoneware were recorded immediately upslope from the "workshop" area.

=== Dee Township ===
The abandoned Dee Township is located about one kilometre southwest of the smelter area. The township area consists of the remains of at least 3–4 buildings. Two chimneys interpreted as belonging to two distinct domestic structures have been identified. One chimney is still intact and stands approximately 3 metres (9.8 ft) in height. A second chimney located approximately 8 metres (26 ft) distant to the intact chimney is mostly collapsed, the remains standing 1.3 metres (4 ft 3 in) in height. A third structure interpreted as the "bakehouse" was recorded 40 metres (130 ft) south of the intact domestic chimney. This site featured base/footings of a chimney stack and short wall remnants, a floor measuring 5.3 by 4.0 metres (17.4 ft × 13.1 ft), five ships tanks 1.2 by 1.2 metres (3 ft 11 in × 3 ft 11 in) each scattered immediately north and northeast of the site, and small quantities of broken glass, stoneware and ceramics located down slope.

A fourth feature is located to the northeast of ruins of the two domestic structures. A cobbled surface of un-worked locally sourced cobble stones is located adjacent to a modern access track. The surface follows the natural slope, suggesting that it is not a building foundation. The surface measures 18 metres (59 ft) long and 7 metres (23 ft) wide. Close to the cobbled surface is a steel bucket made from riveted folded iron sheeting and strapping.

It is probable that other residences and structures within Dee Township were tent huts, and evidence of these structures may remain in shallow subsurface deposits around the identified elements of the township.

== Heritage listing ==
Adolphus William Copper Smelter and Dee Township was listed on the Queensland Heritage Register on 13 May 2011 having satisfied the following criteria.

The Adolphus William Copper Smelter and Dee Township has the potential to reveal important information about Queensland's history including a better understanding of early copper smelting practices in central Queensland, and aspects of life on and around a 19th-century copper smelter site. Mining and associated industries such as smelting had a major role in stimulating the development of local, regional and state economies and underpinning the growth of central Queensland. For most of the period 1860s - 1890s, central Queensland was the predominant copper producing area of the State.

The Adolphus William Smelter and Dee Township is a rare surviving example of a copper smelter and township complex from the early phase of copper mining in central Queensland, one of the most intact examples of its type, and is representative of copper smelting practice in central Queensland during this period.

The reverberatory furnace was the predominant copper smelter technology in use in Queensland and Australia until the 1890s and the central Queensland region featured by far the greatest number of smelters of this type. The Adolphus William is one of only three reverberatory furnace smelter sites that survive with some degree of integrity in central Queensland and from this period - the others being the remains of Flanagan's Smelter at Kariboe Creek, southeast of Biloela, and Mount Orange Smelter southwest of Mackay. The Adolphus William survives with a degree of intactness and integrity not evident at these other locations, as, unlike other remnant smelter sites in central and southern Queensland it was not reopened or reused following closure. Archaeological investigations of the Adolphus William will provide the opportunity to examine this influential smelting technology through the application of archaeological techniques to the remaining structures and archaeological deposits, and a rare opportunity to illuminate aspects of local adaptation of copper smelting technologies in Queensland through further analysis of the archaeological remains.

The Adolphus William Copper Smelter and Dee Township complex is the only known smelter and township complex from this period in central Queensland's copper mining history where an associated abandoned township survives with researchable archaeological integrity and potential. The Dee Township has obvious surface remains and reasonable integrity translating to good archaeological research potential. The Dee Township exhibits the primary characteristics of a number of mining fields of the 19th century where a specific township site was developed due to the presence of a mine, but was then quickly abandoned once the mine closed. Archaeological investigations within the Dee Township may reveal important insights into life on an early mining and smelting operation which is otherwise unobtainable at other sites of this type or is otherwise undocumented. Excavations on and around the several relatively intact living floors, the town bakery and indeterminate cobble path or foundation area at the lower end of the town has potential to provide more reliable dates of occupation and archaeological artefacts that provide a better picture of life in remote mining settlements of this type.
