= Dawson Valley (Theodore) railway line =

Former railway line in Queensland, Australia

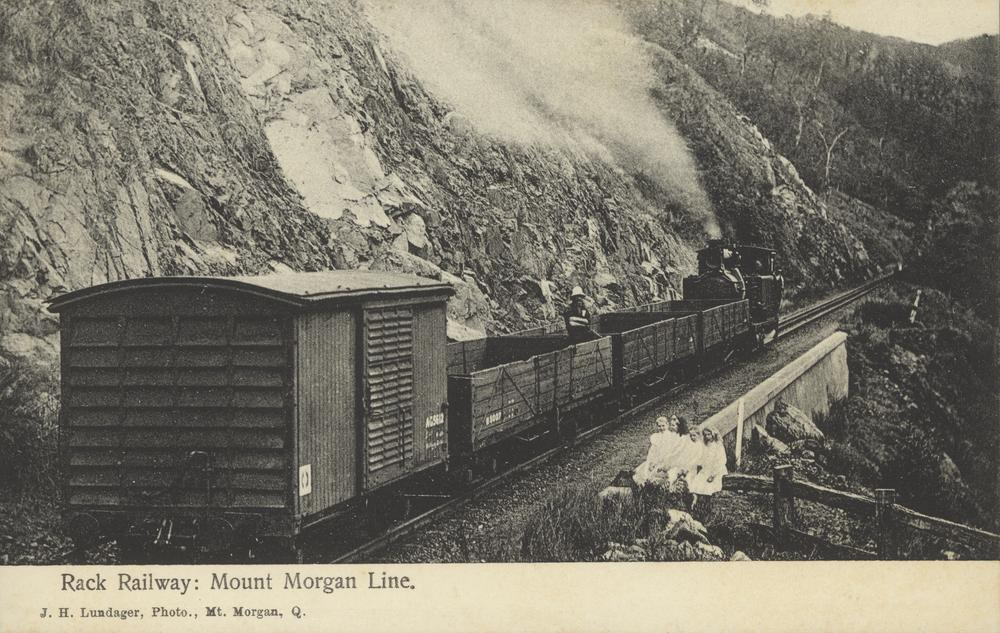
Abt rack railway up the Razorback Range, near Mount Morgan ~1905

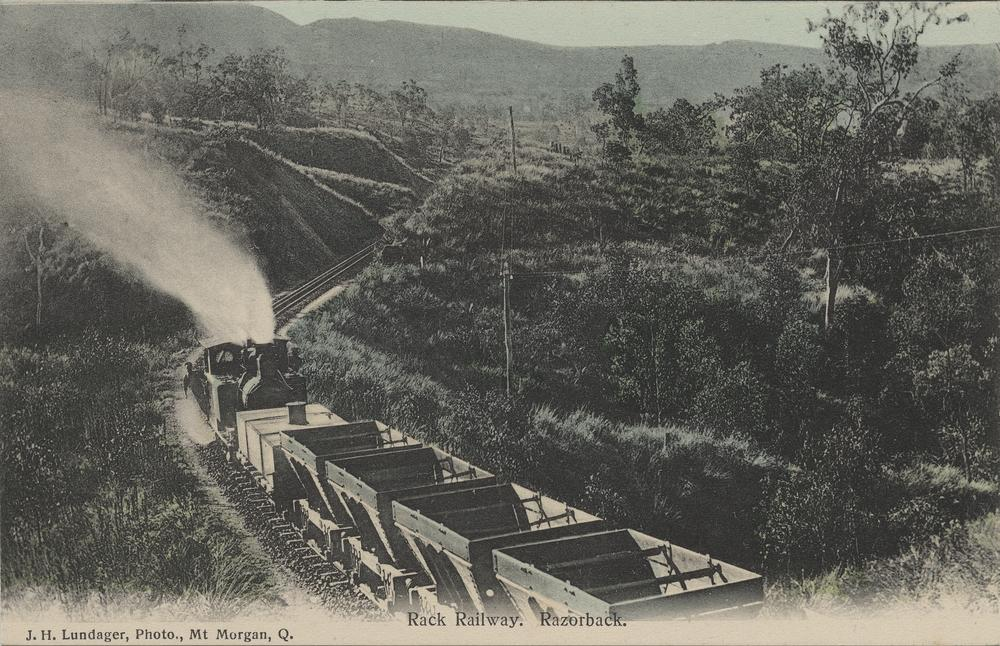
Rack loco descending from Mt Morgan, 1905

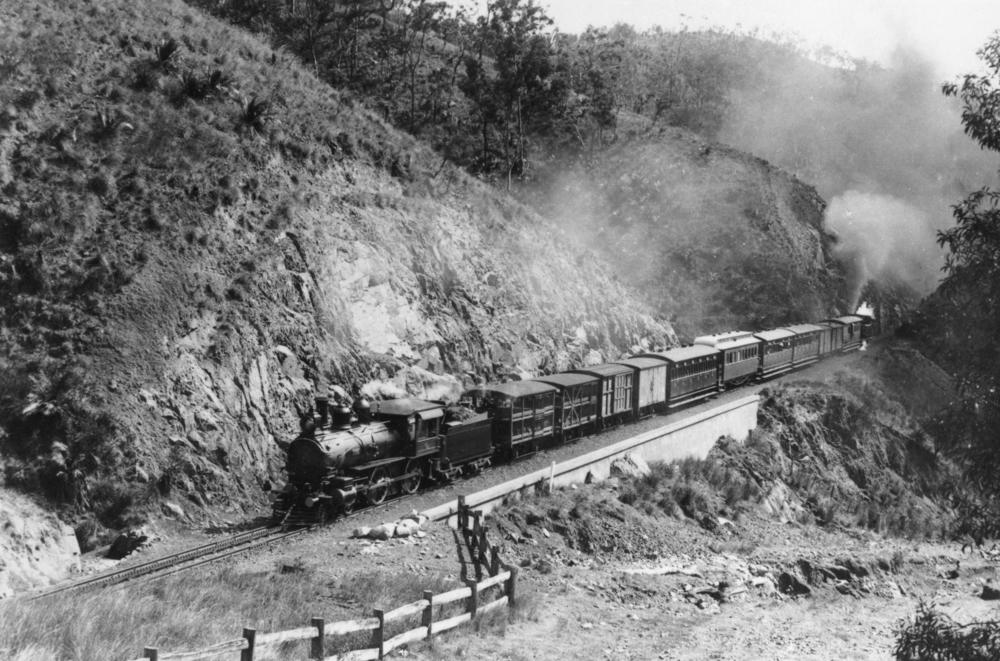
Passenger train ascending the Rack section, 1910

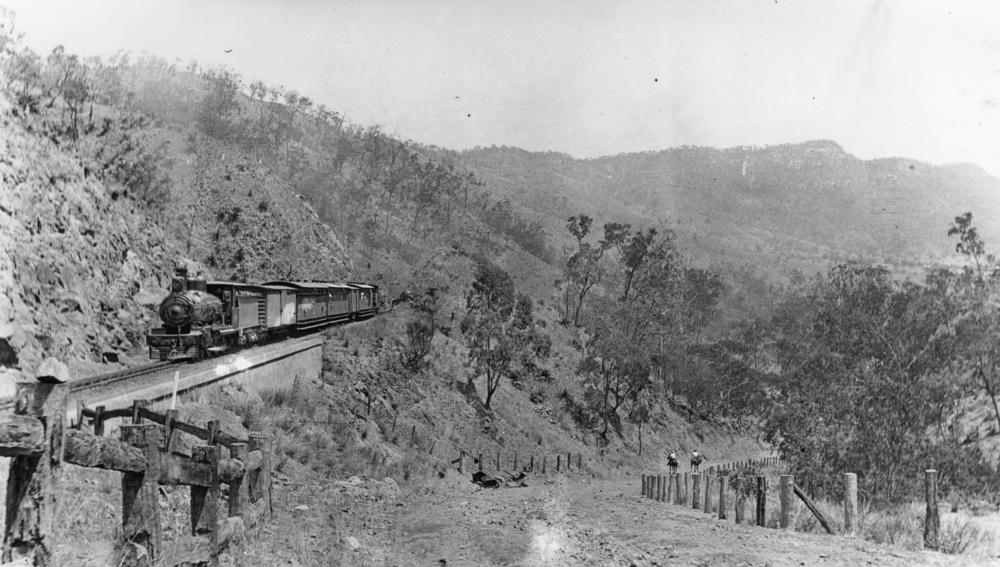
Passenger train ascending the Rack section, 1913. Note that adjacent track, with a grade of 1 in 5 (20%)

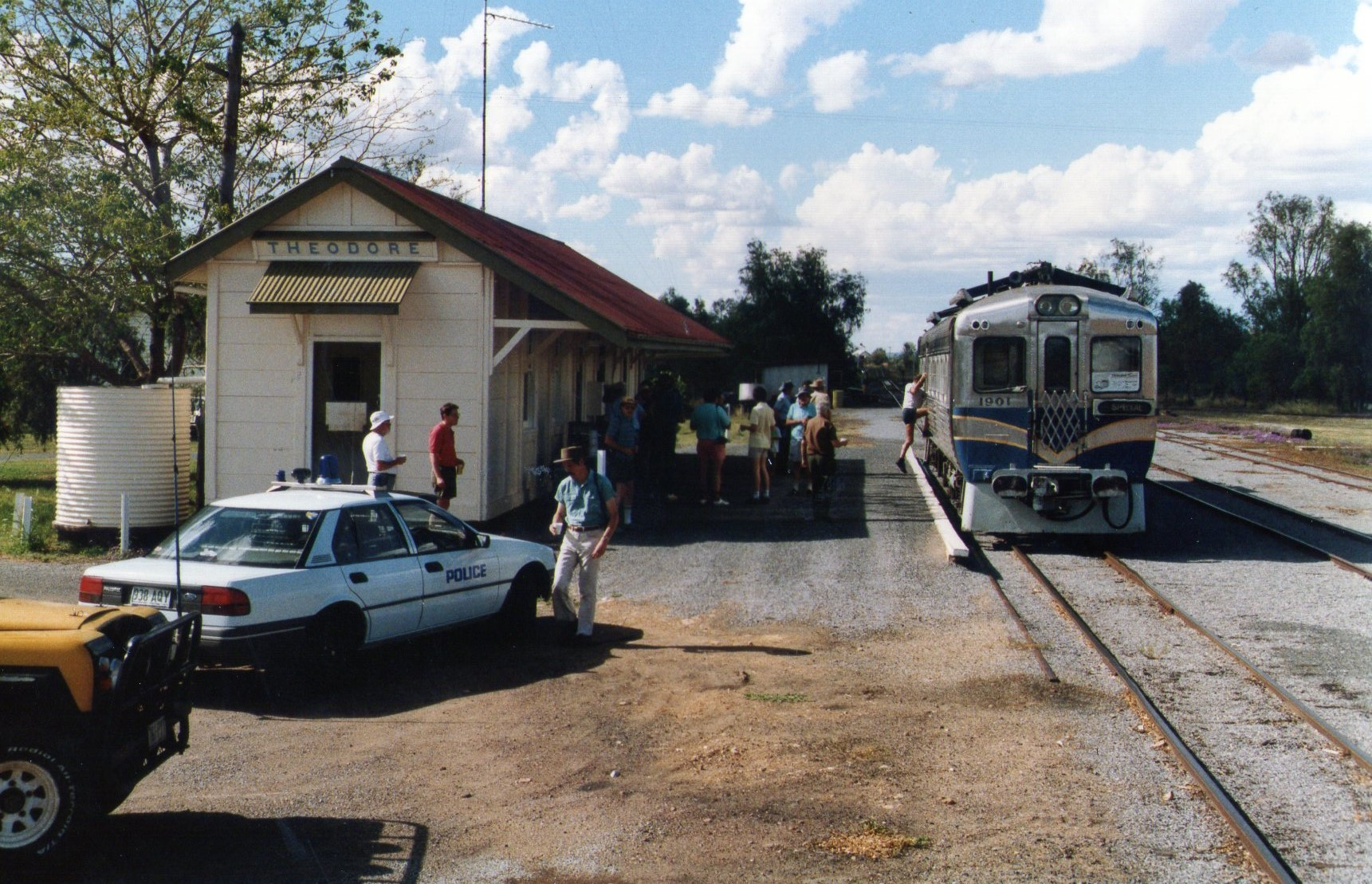
RM 1901 at Theodore Station, ~1991

The Dawson Valley Branch Railway was a railway line in Central Queensland, Australia. It branched from the Central Western railway line at Kabra in the Rockhampton Region and went via Mount Morgan to Theodore in the Shire of Banana. It opened in a series of sections between 1898 and 1927, and featured a rack railway section, one of only 3 such systems in Australia.

== History ==
Gold was discovered in the Mount Morgan region of Central Queensland in 1882. The Mount Morgan Gold Mining Company was authorised by government in 1890 to build a railway link to Rockhampton but it did not proceed.

Revised plans were approved by Queensland Parliament in December 1896 for a government-built line. The 1890 proposal had involved a conventional line with 1 in 50 (2%) grades and a tunnel at the crest of the Razorback Range. Its cost and the risk of the mine having a short life deterred both the government and the company. By adopting a rack railway section the cost of building the line was 52% of the 1890 proposal.

The branch line commenced at Kabra about 15 kilometres (9.3 mi) west of Rockhampton on the Central West line and headed south towards Mount Morgan. The first stage opened on 15 June 1898 and reached Moonmera at the foot of a steep climb to Mount Morgan. A siding was located enroute at Boongary.

=== Abt rack section ===
The next stage to Moongan was a 2,315-metre (7,595 ft) Abt rack system to negotiate grades as steep as 1 in 16.5 (6%). The rack system consisted of 2 parallel toothed vertical bars fixed between the rails which connected with specially built locomotives. The rack locomotive pushed from the rear of the train during ascent to prevent runaways if a coupling broke, and the front during descent, as the rack provided part of the braking force. Kirkhall, Baree and Walterhall (which was the junction for the branch to the mine itself) were stops above the rack section. The line to Mount Morgan railway station was officially opened on Friday 2 December 1898.

After opening, three mixed trains ran daily to and from Rockhampton railway station. Two trains ran each way on Sundays thus enabling visitors to conveniently travel the short distance between Mount Morgan and Rockhampton. Despite the high cost of operating the rack section, the line proved very profitable due to the volume of traffic created by, and for the mine. 'Suburban' services ran from Moongan to Mount Morgan and return to cater for mine workers.

=== Southwest extension ===
The discovery of coal in the Dawson Valley in 1900 generated interest in extending the line from Mount Morgan. Parliament approved a south-west extension in late 1909 to take the line as far as Baralaba. It opened in three stages. Terminating at Wowan, the first stage opened on 16 October 1912 and en route sidings appeared at Talban, Kenbula, Ulogie, Muranu, Walmul, Konara, Gelobera, Wura, Dululu and Littles Crossing. The second stage took the line via Buneru, Cooneel and Muruguran to Rannes and opened on 2 February 1915. The third stage from Rannes opened on 30 July 1917 and terminated at Baralaba after passing through Kokotungo and Kalewa.

The Callide Valley line junctioned at Rannes when it opened in 1924.

The transport of coal to Mount Morgan and for the Railways Department was a major contributor to the extended service.

The proposed Dawson Valley Irrigation Scheme was to open up agricultural land for close settlement along the Dawson River and was expected to create 5 irrigation zones with 5000 farms and a total population of 50,000 on its farms and towns. The first of these irrigation zone towns was to be Theodore. This prompted approval of a 95 kilometres (59 mi) extension further south from Baralaba along the Dawson Valley in 1922. It was completed in two stages – via Harcourt, Mungi, Moura and Gibihi terminating at Nipan on 21 June 1926, and then via Willawa terminating at Theodore (previously called Castle Creek) on 7 May 1927. In its original conception, the line was to be subsequently extended from Theodore to Delusion Creek in Isla to support the Isla irrigation zone. However, the Nathan Dam, the centrepiece of the Dawson Valley Irrigation Scheme, was never built, and the extension to Delusion Creek was never required.

The service to Theodore was laborious. A mixed train arrived at 4.30am twice a week and departed at 7.30am. The journey to Mount Morgan took almost 8 hours. A weekly rail motor service introduced in 1952 reduced the journey to Rockhampton to some 6 ½ hours.

=== Bypassing the rack ===
The rack railway section near Mount Morgan was closed in 1952 after a conventional line was built to bypass it, with grades of 1 in 50 (2%). This occurred because the rack locomotives were due for replacement and the rack section was becoming a bottleneck in the haulage of coal from Callide Coalfields.

In 1961 a new coal mine (now known as the Dawson mine) was opened south-east of the town of Moura. Initially coal was loaded at a siding at Kianga, 15 km south of Moura. In 1963 a 12 km (7.5 mi) line was built from Moura to the new mine. At that time the most powerful steam locomotive owned by QR known as the Beyer-Garratt could haul a 750-ton coal load.

== Partial closure ==
Sections from Kabra to Mount Morgan and Wowan (69 km; 43 mi) and from Baralaba to Moura (47 km; 29 mi) were closed from 1 August 1987 and the lines were taken up, except for a short section at Mt Morgan. The Goolara-Theodore section (5 km; 3.1 mi) closed in 1993, and the Wowan-Rannes (25 km; 16 mi) and Kooemba-Baralaba (12 km; 7.5 mi) sections closed in 1995. Goolara is the site of a grain terminal, and the Goolara-Moura section is now effectively part of the Moura railway line.

Since 1968 Moura coal has been hauled to Gladstone via the Moura Short Line. When it opened, triple header diesel hauled trains took 4000 ton coal loads direct to Gladstone.

== Route ==
Dawson Valley railway line
Distance from Rockhampton	Stations	Present locality	Coordinates	Altitude	Notes
9 miles 74 chains (16.0 km)	Kabra	Kabra, Rockhampton Region	23.4689°S 150.3946°E	91 feet (28 m)	Line branches from the Central Western railway line at Kabra.
13 miles 58 chains (22.1 km)	Boongary	Kabra	23.5196°S 150.4069°E	221 feet (67 m)	
	Callan	Kabra	23.5443°S 150.3994°E	331 feet (101 m)	
17 miles 1 chain (27.4 km)	Bundaleer	Bouldercombe	23.5521°S 150.3814°E	448 feet (137 m)	
18 miles 56 chains (30.1 km)	Moonmera	Bouldercombe	23.5630°S 150.3882°E	520 feet (160 m)	
22 miles 13 chains (35.7 km)	Moongan	Moongan	23.6064°S 150.3969°E	893 feet (272 m)	
23 miles 7 chains (37.2 km)	Kirkhall	Baree	23.6188°S 150.3915°E	824 feet (251 m)	
23 miles 47 chains (38.0 km)	Baree	Baree	23.6236°S 150.3895°E	784 feet (239 m)	
24 miles 6 chains (38.7 km)	Walterhall	Mount Morgan	23.6302°S 150.3876°E	761 feet (232 m)	
24 miles 57 chains (39.8 km)	Mount Morgan	Mount Morgan	23.6392°S 150.3867°E	748 feet (228 m)	
25 miles 71 chains (41.7 km)	Talban	The Mine	23.6505°S 150.3759°E	707 feet (215 m)	
26 miles 39 chains (42.6 km)	Kenbula	The Mine	23.6580°S 150.3706°E	681 feet (208 m)	
27 miles 12 chains (43.7 km)	Ulogie	Trotter Creek	23.6725°S 150.3706°E	671 feet (205 m)	Despite the name, Ulogie railway station is not in the present-day locality of Ulogie.
29 miles 20 chains (47.1 km)	Muranu	Trotter Creek	23.6849°S 150.3545°E	614 feet (187 m)	
33 miles 77 chains (54.7 km)	Walmul	Walmul	23.7254°S 150.3740°E	547 feet (167 m)	
37 miles 47 chains (60.5 km)	Konara	Oakey Creek / Wura	23.7679°S 150.3548°E	506 feet (154 m)	
40 miles 39 chains (65.2 km)	Gelobera	Wura	23.8014°S 150.3476°E	480 feet (150 m)	
42 miles 38 chains (68.4 km)	Wura	Wura	23.8135°S 150.3220°E	453 feet (138 m)	
43 miles 32 chains (69.8 km)	Boogargan	Dululu, Shire of Banana	23.8123°S 150.3083°E		
47 miles 23 chains (76.1 km)	Dululu	Dululu	23.8455°S 150.2612°E	421 feet (128 m)	
50 miles 25 chains (81.0 km)	Littles Crossing	Dululu	23.8714°S 150.2232°E	297 feet (91 m)	
53 miles 26 chains (85.8 km)	Wowan	Wowan	23.9057°S 150.1980°E	368 feet (112 m)	
56 miles 76 chains (91.7 km)	Buneru	Wowan	23.9563°S 150.1733°E	367 feet (112 m)	
58 miles 69 chains (94.7 km)	Cooneel	Wowan	23.9787°S 150.1603°E	354 feet (108 m)	
61 miles 78 chains (99.7 km)	Muruguran	Wowan	24.0204°S 150.1450°E	355 feet (108 m)	
68 miles 43 chains (110.3 km)	Rannes	Goovigen	24.1035°S 150.1182°E	327 feet (100 m)	Callide Valley railway line branches off at Rannes.
78 miles 18 chains (125.9 km)	Kokotungo	Kokotungo	24.1373°S 149.9969°E	335 feet (102 m)	
83 miles 50 chains (134.6 km)	Kooemba	Kokotungo	24.1642°S 149.9225°E	347 feet (106 m)	
86 miles 72 chains (139.9 km)	Kalewa	Kokotungo	24.1616°S 149.8731°E	281 feet (86 m)	
91 miles 6 chains (146.6 km)	Baralaba	Baralaba	24.1782°S 149.8137°E	307 feet (94 m)	
					Spur to State Coal Mine
98 miles 8 chains (157.9 km)	Wonbindi	Baralaba	24.2712°S 149.8474°E	289 feet (88 m)	
101 miles 0 chains (162.5 km)	Harcourt	Baralaba	24.3134°S 149.8476°E	298 feet (91 m)	
105 miles 70 chains (170.4 km)	Bindaree	Baralaba	24.3793°S 149.8645°E	314 feet (96 m)	
109 miles 40 chains (176.2 km)	Mungi	Moura	24.4307°S 149.8724°E	323 feet (98 m)	
115 miles 6 chains (185.2 km)	Kinma	Moura	24.5056°S 149.9092°E	433 feet (132 m)	
121 miles 17 chains (195.1 km)	Moura	Moura	24.5676°S 149.9760°E	462 feet (141 m)	Moura is still an operational station, as it is also on the Moura railway line.
124 miles 53 chains (200.6 km)	Gibihi	Kianga	24.6153°S 149.9977°E	484 feet (148 m)	
130 miles 40 chains (210.0 km)	Kianga	Kianga	24.6949°S 150.0124°E	514 feet (157 m)	
136 miles 14 chains (219.2 km)	Nipan	Kianga	24.7742°S 150.0217°E	436 feet (133 m)	
140 miles 25 chains (225.8 km)	Willawa	Kianga	24.8324°S 150.0337°E	515 feet (157 m)	
142 miles 50 chains (229.5 km)	Kaloola	Kianga	24.8487°S 150.0624°E	531 feet (162 m)	
146 miles 72 chains (236.4 km)	Goolara	Lonesome Creek	24.9069°S 150.0805°E	461 feet (141 m)	
149 miles 72 chains (241.2 km)	Theodore	Theodore	24.9491°S 150.0820°E	461 feet (141 m)	

== Gallery ==
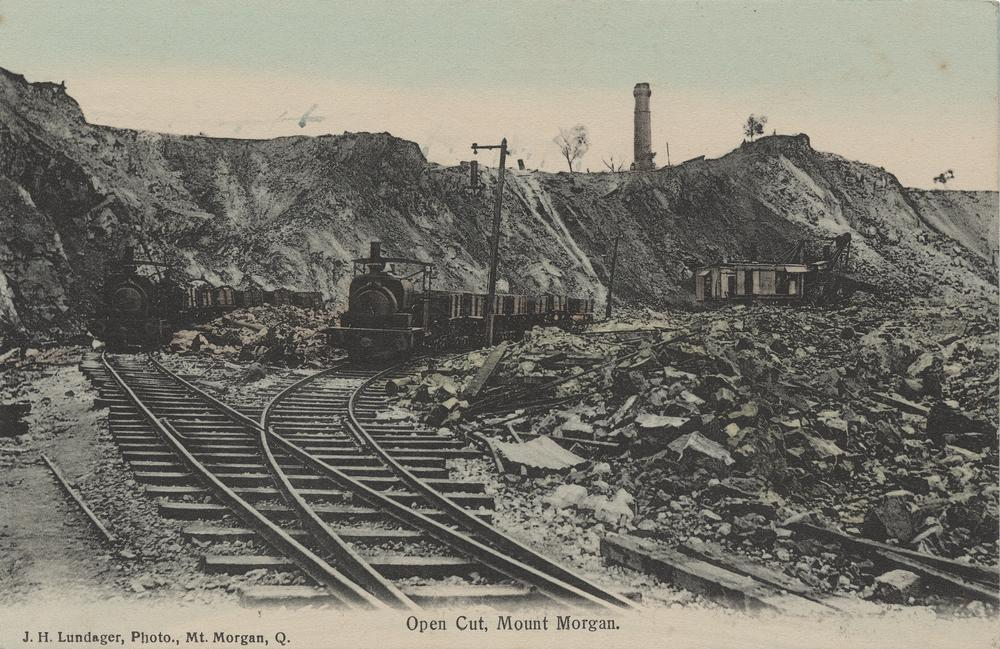
View of the Mt Morgan open cut mine, 1905

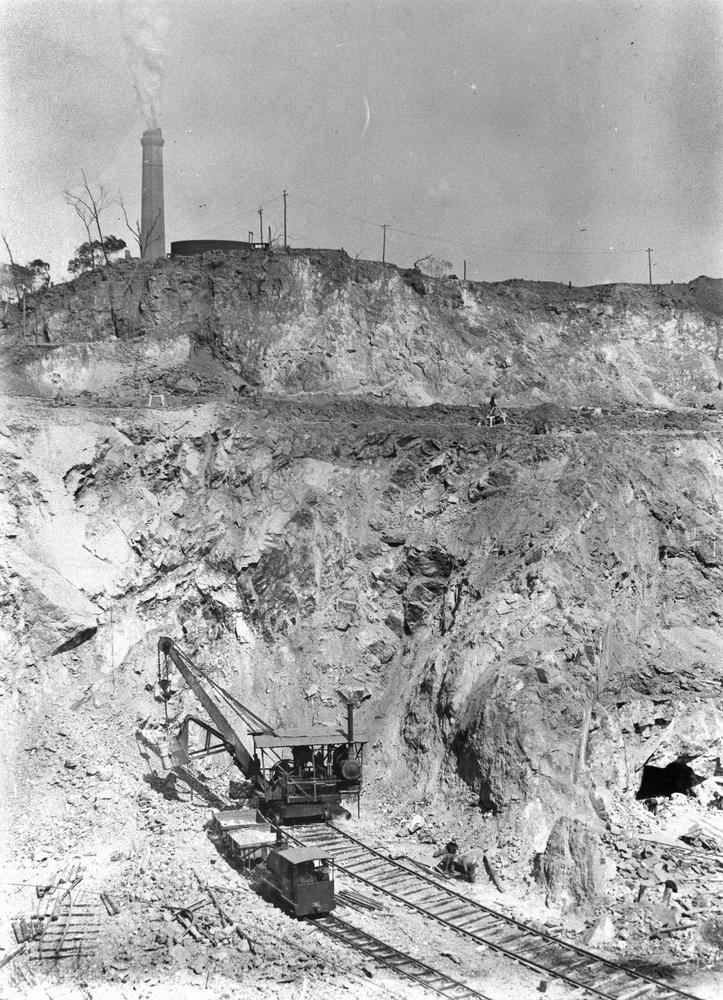
Rail mounted machinery in the Mt Morgan open cut mine, 1908

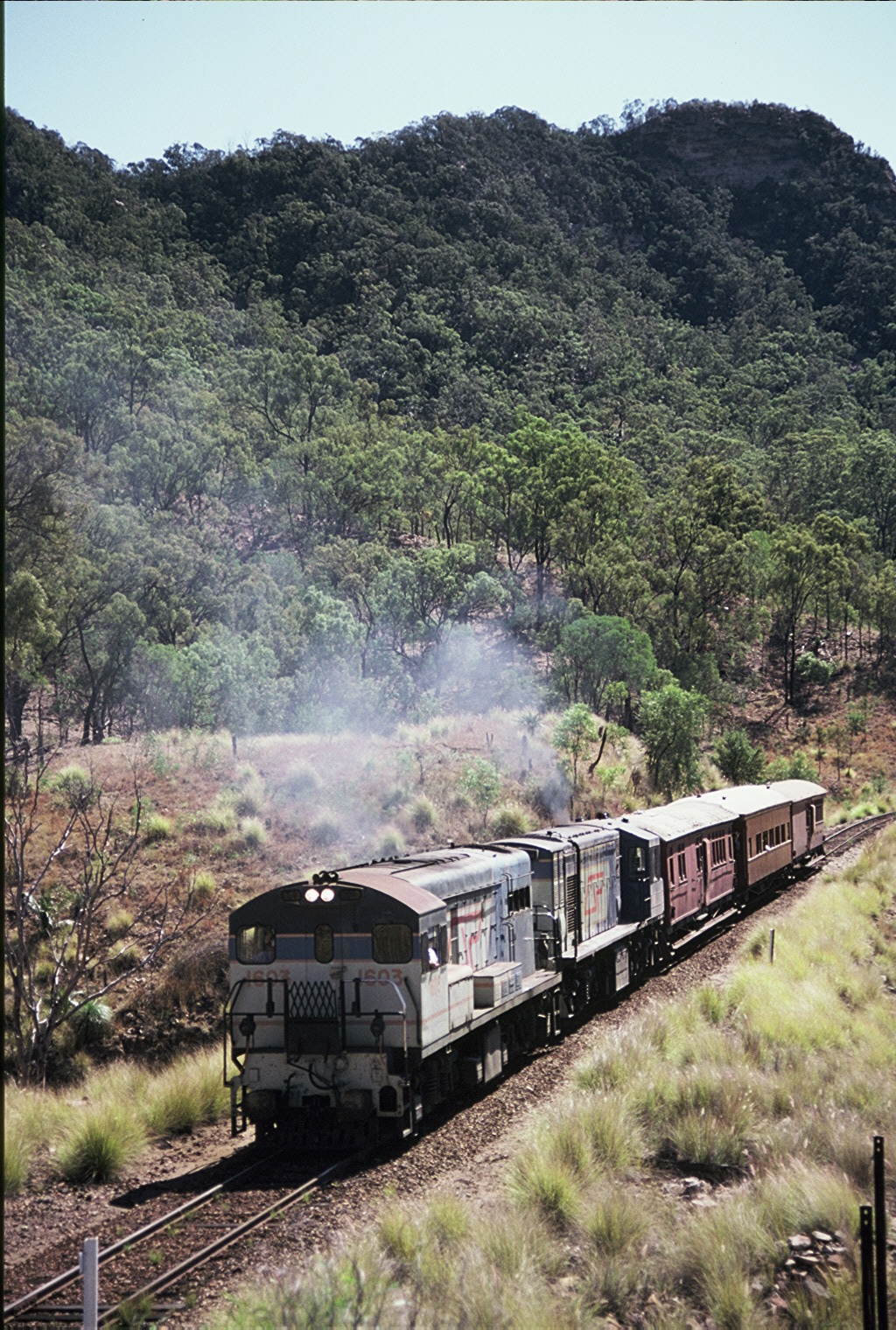
QR locos 1603 & 1634 climb the Razorback Range on the 'Last Train to Mt Morgan' tour, 1 August 1987

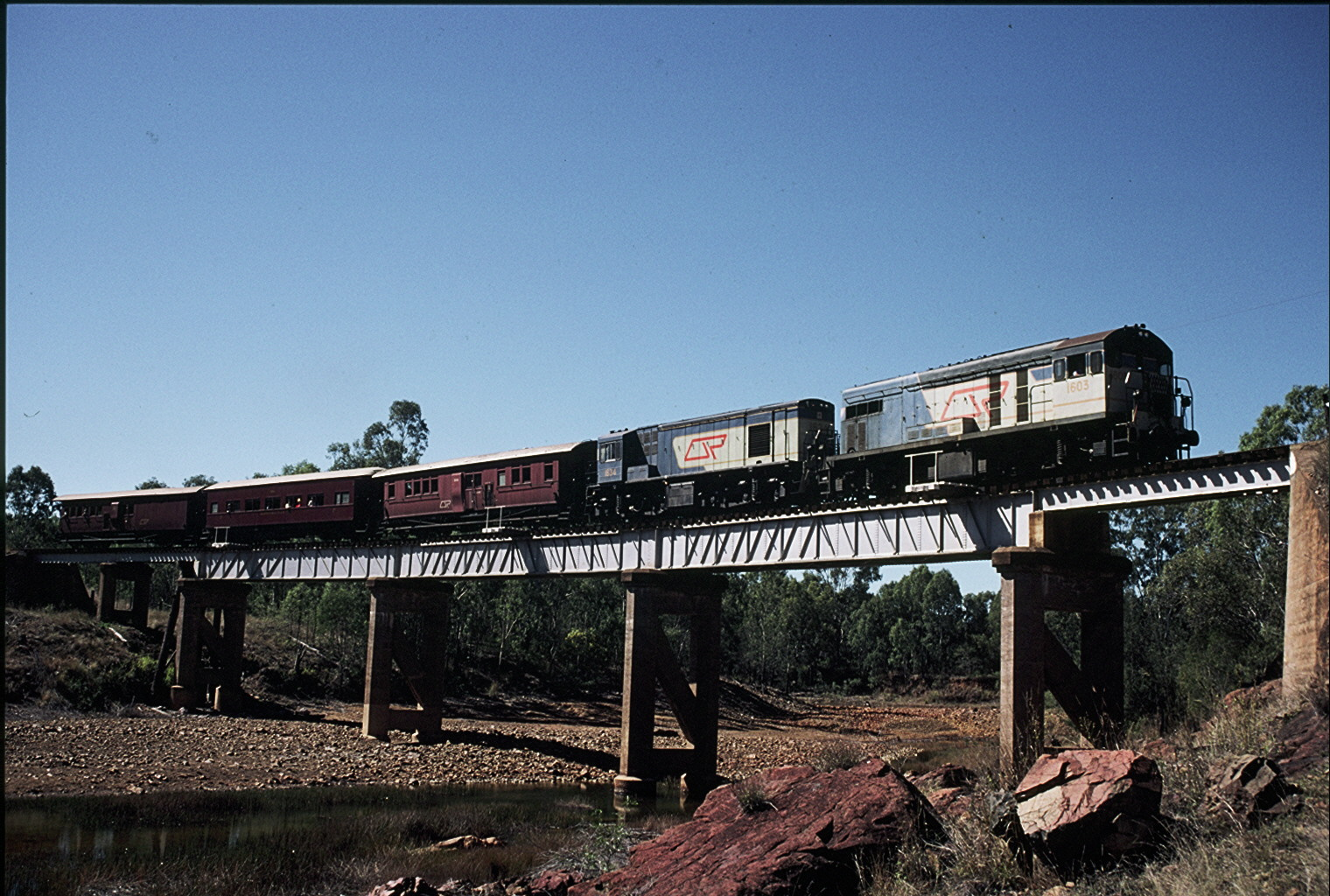
QR locos 1603 & 1634 south of Mt Morgan, 1 August 1987

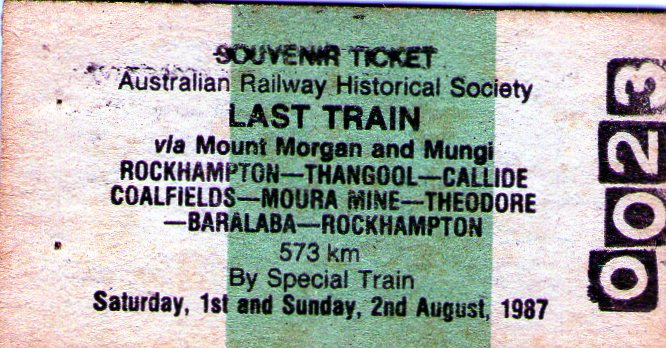
Rail Ticket for 'Last Train to Mt Morgan' tour 1987

== See also ==
- Rail transport in Queensland
