= Number 7 Dam =

Dam in Queensland, Australia

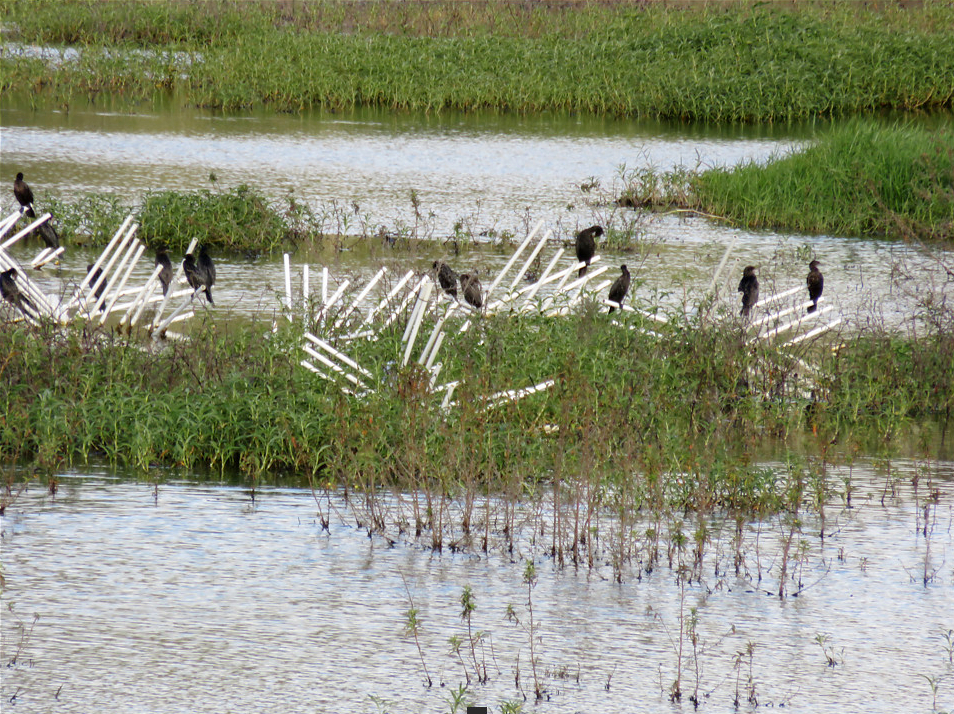
- Cormorants fishing in the reservoir, 2022

- Location of the dam in Queensland
- Interactive map of Number 7 Dam
- Official name: Mount Morgan Water Supply - Raised No.7 Dam
- Country: Australia
- Location: Mount Morgan, Queensland
- Coordinates: 23°38′42″S 150°24′24″E
- Purpose: Water supply
- Status: Operational
- Opening date: 1900 (industrial); 1998 (water supply)
- Built by: Mount Morgan Gold Mining Company
- Operator: Rockhampton Regional Council

Dam and spillways
- Type of dam: Gravity dam
- Impounds: Dee River
- Height (foundation): 16 m (52 ft)
- Length: 464 m (1,522 ft)
- Elevation at crest: 248.3 m (815 ft) AHD
- Dam volume: 11,000 m^{3} (390,000 cu ft)
- Spillway type: Uncontrolled
- Spillway length: 90.6 m (297 ft)
- Spillway capacity: 2,070 m^{3}/s (73,000 cu ft/s)

Reservoir
- Total capacity: 2,926 ML (2,372 acre⋅ft)
- Catchment area: 38.8 km^{2} (15.0 sq mi)
- Surface area: 54 ha (130 acres)
- Normal elevation: 241 m (791 ft) AHD

The Number 7 Dam, also known as the Big Dam, is a concrete gravity dam across the Dee River, located close to Mount Morgan, in the Rockhampton Region of Queensland, Australia. The impoundment is the primary source of potable water for the town of Mount Morgan.

== Overview ==
The dam, officially known as the Mount Morgan Water Supply - Raised No.7 Dam, was built by Mount Morgan Gold Mining Company Limited upstream from the Mount Morgan mine in 1900. Due to a serious drought at the time, the dam was not filled until May 1904.

The wall was raised by 4.5 metres (15 ft) in 1999 to its current height of 16 metres (52 ft), and the wall is 463 metres (1,519 ft) long. The resultant reservoir has capacity of 2,926 megalitres (2,372 acre⋅ft) when full. The reservoir reached maximum capacity for the first time on 22 November 2000 when water spilled over the dam wall.

In 2021, the dam was depleted due to drought conditions and water was trucked to the Mount Morgan water treatment plant at considerable expense to the Rockhampton Regional Council. In November 2022, the council proposed building a potable water pipeline connecting the Gracemere and Mount Morgan water supply networks as an alternative water supply mechanism.

== Recreation ==
The surrounds of the dam are popular for recreation with playgrounds, barbecues and picnic facilities.

In 2019, artificial fish habitats were introduced into the dam waters to support the release of golden perch fingerlings and other species to improve opportunities for recreational fishing. Fish species in the dam include yellow belly, southern saratoga, and redclaw.

== See also ==
- List of dams and reservoirs in Australia
