= Dee River (Queensland) =

Dee
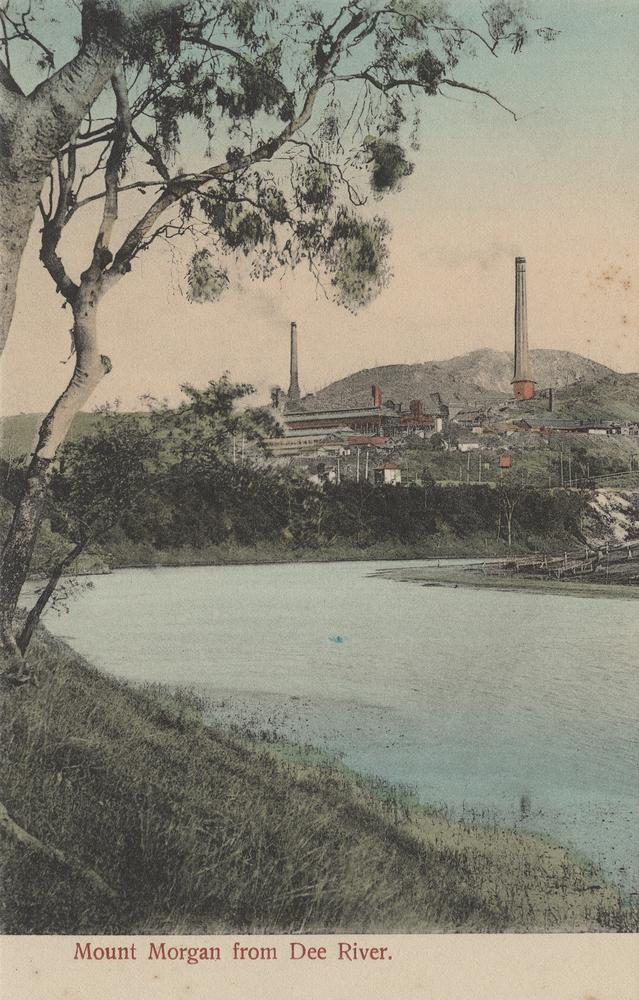
- Dee River at Mount Morgan, circa 1905

- Location of Dee River mouth in Queensland

Location
- Country: Australia
- State: Queensland
- Region: Central Queensland
- Settlements: Mount Morgan, Dululu

Physical characteristics
- Source: Razorback Range
  - location: south of Bouldercombe
  - coordinates: 23°36′50″S 150°29′38″E
  - elevation: 642 m (2,106 ft)
- Mouth: confluence with the Don River
  - location: near Rannes
  - coordinates: 24°05′28″S 150°07′43″E
  - elevation: 55 m (180 ft)
- Length: 97 km (60 mi)

Basin features
- River system: Fitzroy River
- Tributaries
  - left: Limestone Creek, Horse Creek, Hamilton Creek, Nine Mile Creek
  - right: Boulder Creek, Oaky Creek, Pruce Creek
- Resources Reserve: Bouldercombe Gorge Resources Reserve

The Dee River is a river in Central Queensland, Australia.

== Course and features ==
Part of the Fitzroy River system, the Dee River rises in the Razorback Range south of Bouldercombe Gorge Resources Reserve near Mount Gavial, south of Bouldercombe. The river flows generally south by west through the mining settlement of Mount Morgan, Waluml and Dululu, where the river is crossed by the Burnett Highway. The river is joined by seven minor tributaries including Limestone Creek, Horse Creek, Hamilton Creek, Nine Mile Creek, Boulder Creek, Oaky Creek and Pruce Creek. The Dee River forms its confluence with the Don River near Rannes.

The largest dam on the river is Number 7 Dam, built for the Mount Morgan Mine, which has a history of acid mine discharge from gold and copper mining entering the Dee River.

== Mine pit ==
In January 2013, the mine pit overflowed. Approximately 700 millimetres (28 in) of rain fell after ex-tropical Cyclone Oswald resulted in the 2013 Eastern Australia floods. Towards the end of February the dam was spilling acid and heavy metals into the river. Concerns regarding the discolouration of the river's water and fears of contamination causing irreversible damage to the river were raised in mid-2011.

== See also ==
- List of rivers of Australia § Queensland
