= Mount Morgan State High School =

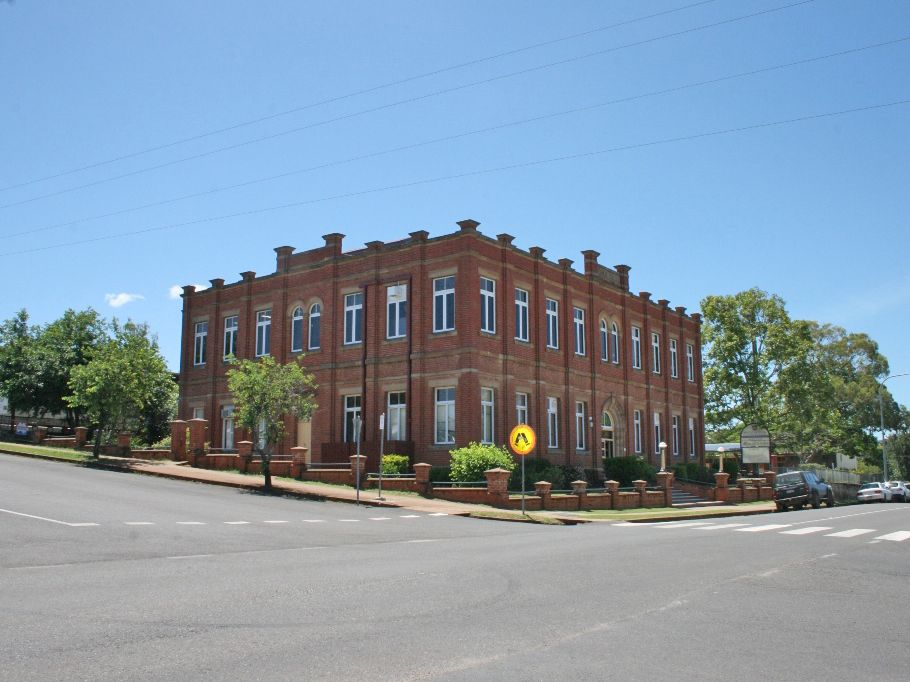
- Technical College Building, corner of Central and Dee Streets, from the south-east, 2015

- Location within Queensland
- 23.6436°S 150.3869°E
- Location: 4 Central Street, Mount Morgan, Rockhampton Region, Queensland, Australia

History
- Design period: 1900–1914 (Early 20th century)
- Built: 1908, 1913–1918

Site notes
- Architectural style: Classicism

Queensland Heritage Register
- Official name: Mount Morgan State High School; Mount Morgan Technical College
- Type: state heritage
- Designated: 4 December 2015
- Reference no.: 650005
- Type: Education, Research, Scientific Facility: School – state (high); Education, research, scientific facility: College-technical
- Theme: Educating Queenslanders: Providing secondary education; Educating Queenslanders: Educating adults

Mount Morgan State High School is a heritage-listed state high school and technical college at 4 Central Street, Mount Morgan, Rockhampton Region, Queensland, Australia. It was built in 1908. It was formerly known as Mount Morgan Technical College. It was added to the Queensland Heritage Register on 4 December 2015.

== History ==
Construction of Mount Morgan State High School commenced in 1908.

Mount Morgan State High School was established in the central Queensland mining town of Mount Morgan in 1912, as one of Queensland's first secondary schools. It commenced operating on the Mount Morgan Technical College site, which the two institutions shared until 1964. The former Technical College Building (1908) and Science Block and Workshop (1913, extended 1918), both masonry buildings, are important in demonstrating the growth of technical colleges in Queensland and the establishment of state high schools. These purpose-designed buildings are excellent examples of technical college and Department of Public Works buildings. The Technical College Building has aesthetic significance for its composition and materials, and as a landmark in the town. The school has been in continuous operation since establishment and has been a focus for the local community as a place for important social and cultural activity.

European settlement commenced at Ironstone Mountain (Mount Morgan's initial name) when mining of gold began there in 1882. In 1888 Mount Morgan's population was 4000 people scattered in a series of settlements located close to the Dee River and the Mount Morgan Gold Mining Company mine. In time, the town centre developed around Morgan and East Streets. Mount Morgan became a municipality (the Borough of Mount Morgan) in 1890 and in the two decades after its creation most of the town's infrastructure was established. From 1898 the town was linked by the Mount Morgan railway line to Rockhampton over the steep Razor Back Range, reducing the town's isolation. According to the 1901 census the population of the area was 8486, with 6280 living within the Mount Morgan municipality. By 1903 the town had a wide variety of facilities and amenities.

After achieving a record annual gold output in 1889 (the highest in the colony), the Mount Morgan mine was the second largest gold producer in Queensland between 1890 and 1909. During the last five years of the 19th century the Mount Morgan Gold Mining Company, which operated the mine, trebled its annual output of ore, employing an army of new men who increased the town's population to 10,000. The highest production of gold was achieved during the period from 1887 to 1897, after which production fell. From 1906–07 the production focus of the mine changed from gold to copper, but falling copper prices impacted adversely on this.

Technical education classes started in Mount Morgan in 1900 to meet the growing need for skilled labour for the Mount Morgan Gold Mining Company. Classes were initially held in the Mount Morgan School of Arts building in Morgan Street, starting with an enrolment of eight. The Technical College was overseen by a committee, which commenced fundraising for a building in 1905.

Technical education in Queensland grew and evolved after the first technical college was established in Brisbane in 1882. Technical education developed out of the Mechanics' Institute / School of Arts movement which arose in Great Britain in the early 19th century, initially "to instruct artisans in the scientific principles of arts and manufactures", which expanded in the Australian colonies. In 1902, the 17 technical colleges in Queensland established a Board of Technical Education to advise the Minister for Public Instruction. In 1905, this Board was abolished and a separate branch of the Department of Public Instruction created to oversee technical education. The total number of technical education students enrolled in Queensland in 1905 was 4171 and the state subsidy for technical education was more than £6204.

In 1906, the Mount Morgan Technical College Committee realised that a new building for the expanding college would be costly, so the institution should be responsible to the Queensland Government rather than the School of Arts. The Committee drew up a constitution that was adopted by the School of Arts Committee on 31 May 1906 and subsequently by the government. The college's new board had 12 members – three appointed by the government; four appointed by Mount Morgan Gold Mining Company; two elected by subscribers of 5s and over; two elected by students of certain standing; and one appointed by subscribers of £250 or more.

Queensland's private schools, technical colleges and schools of arts were not built to a standard plan, but were individually designed with variation in style, size and form. Plans for the Technical College Building (now known as Block A) were prepared in the office of the Mount Morgan Gold Mining Company. The design was approved by the college's board and the Department of Public Works, and the contract for erection of the building was awarded to J K Evans of Rockhampton in November 1907, with Arthur Jenks appointed Clerk of Works. By 1908 enrolments in the Mount Morgan technical education classes had increased to 323 and classes were conducted in various building around the town, attesting to the need for a site dedicated to the technical college.

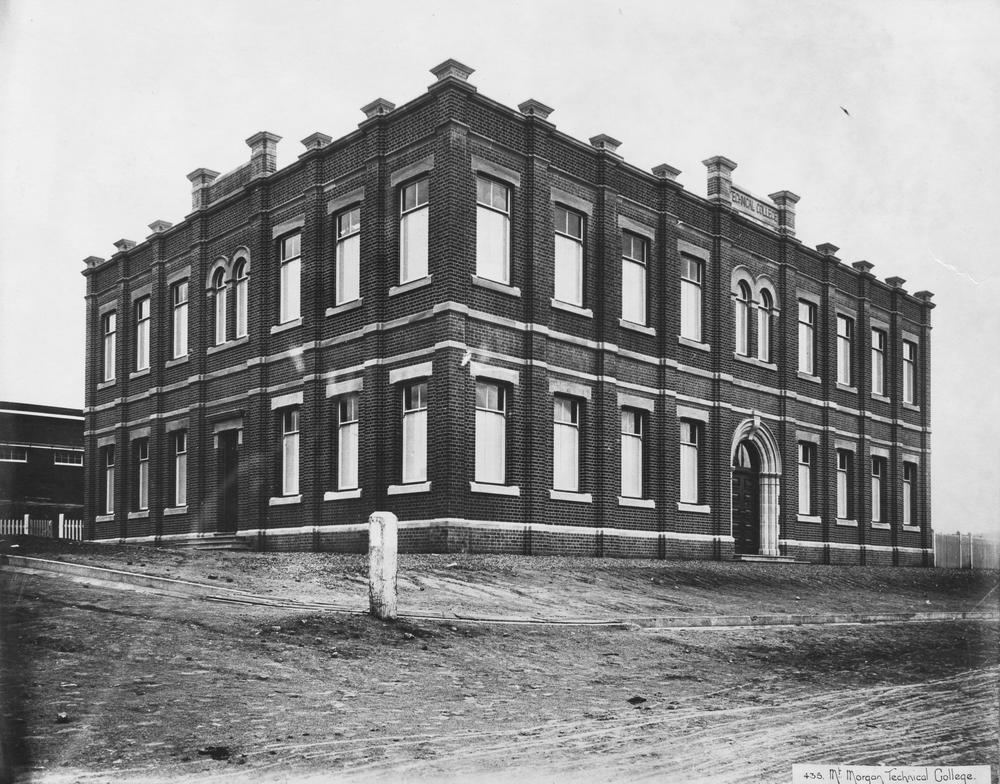
Mount Morgan Technical College, circa 1909

The Mount Morgan Technical College Building, located on the corner of Central and Dee Streets, was completed at the end of 1908. Wherever possible, the building was constructed from materials obtained in Queensland. The bricks were supplied by the Mount Morgan Gold Mining Company and made at the company's brickworks (known locally as Gunthorpe's brickworks after its long-term manager, Robert Gunthorpe), situated behind the Mount Morgan railway station. The stone came from G Sanderson's quarry at Stanwell, while all the timber used in the building was Australian. The furniture was specially designed and manufactured in Rockhampton by W A Lawson.

After the building's completion, The Capricornian newspaper praised the new building and the community:

"The people of Mount Morgan are to be warmly congratulated on the splendid Technical College which has now been completed and will be opened in the course of the next few weeks. With the exception of the College in Brisbane and the School of Mines in Charters Towers it is by far the finest college in the state, and as a building it certainly surpasses the Charters Towers institution. The cost is over £6000 and the college will be opened free from debt, a remarkable achievement. The Government ... assisted ... by a contribution of well over £4000, and the Mount Morgan Company directly and indirectly subscribed £800, besides presenting the land.... The people of Mount Morgan ... provide[d] .... [s]omething like £800 in hard cash..."

Money collected from the community to build the Technical College Building was raised from functions, "brick-selling" donations, donations from individuals and businesses, plus £250 from Walter Russell Hall, Director of the mine. The Mount Morgan Gold Mining Company donated land for the site of the Technical College (worth £800); the Secretary's house; another house for the Principal; as well as the Manual Training Building.

Queensland's prosperity from mining and agricultural pursuits in the first decades of the 20th century enabled the government to implement a campaign of construction of large public buildings. This was the case for the Mount Morgan Technical College which received £4 from the Queensland Government for every £1 raised by community.

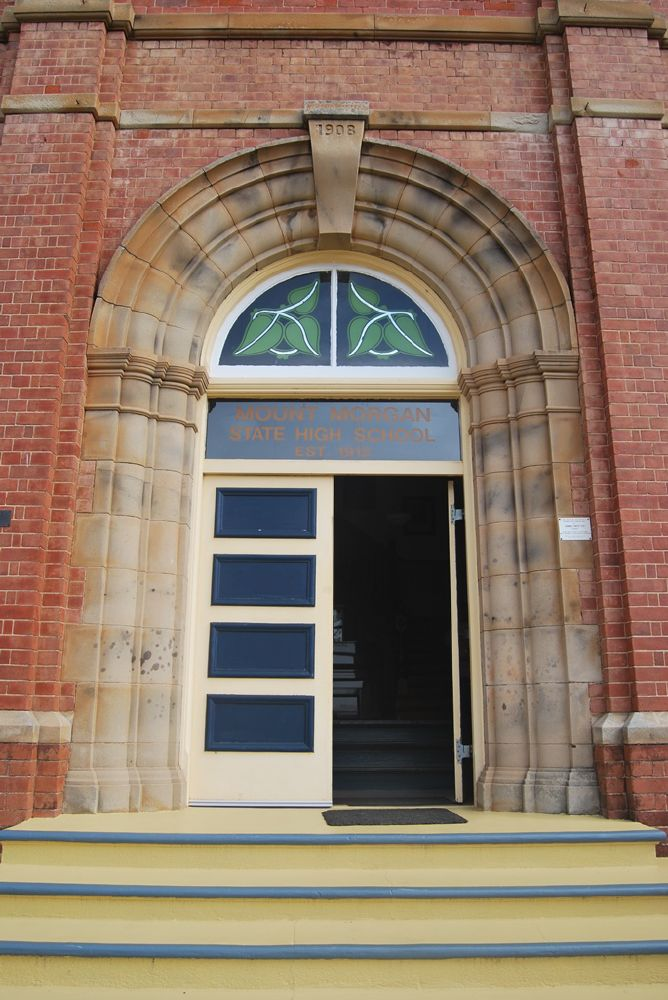
Main entrance, 2015

The technical college was officially opened by the Hon William Kidston, Premier of Queensland, on 24 April 1909. The Capricornian printed the following description of the building at its opening:

"The outside of the building... shows only pure materials – brick and stone and timber. No stucco has been allowed in any shape or form, the only plaster being on the inside of the walls of the rooms to ensure ... smooth surfaces for the purposes of light and cleanliness. The question of lighting the rooms both day and night has had especial study and we consider the desired result has been achieved. The main building contains seven classrooms – four on the ground floor and three on the first floor – and in addition, a board-room and library combined, a main entrance hall or vestibule and a museum, besides passages and verandah balcony. The rooms have all been designed to suit present and future conditions and include a demonstration theatre, where demonstrations in physics, chemistry and cookery are held. In additional to the main building, practical classes are held in plumbing in what is called the malthoid building and in practical mechanical engineering and carpentry in the workshops of the Mount Morgan Goldmining Company. The total amount spent on the building is £4301 and on equipment £1699, making a total of £6000."

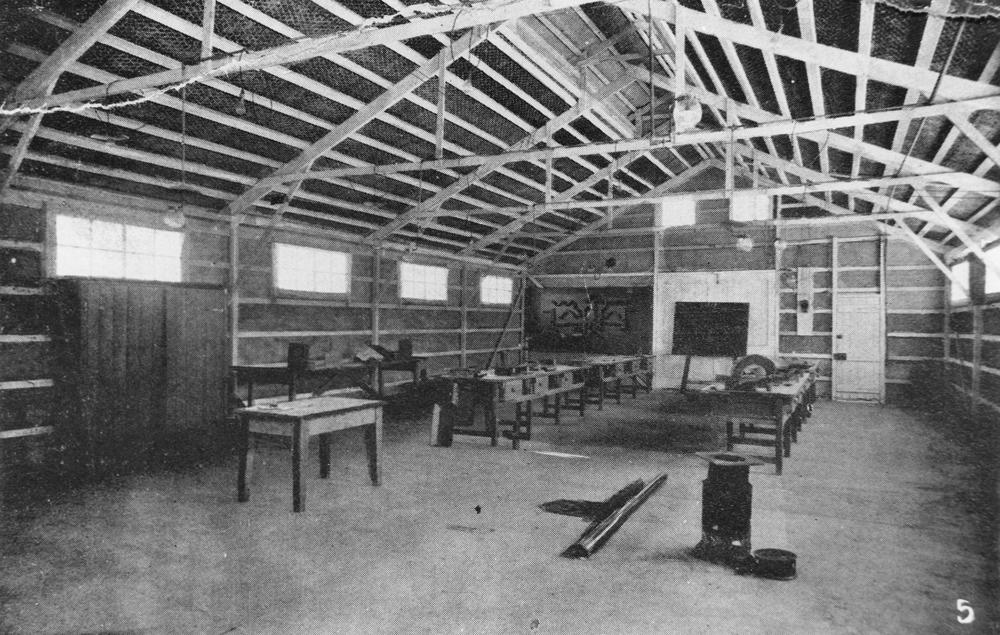
Plumbing classroom, 1909

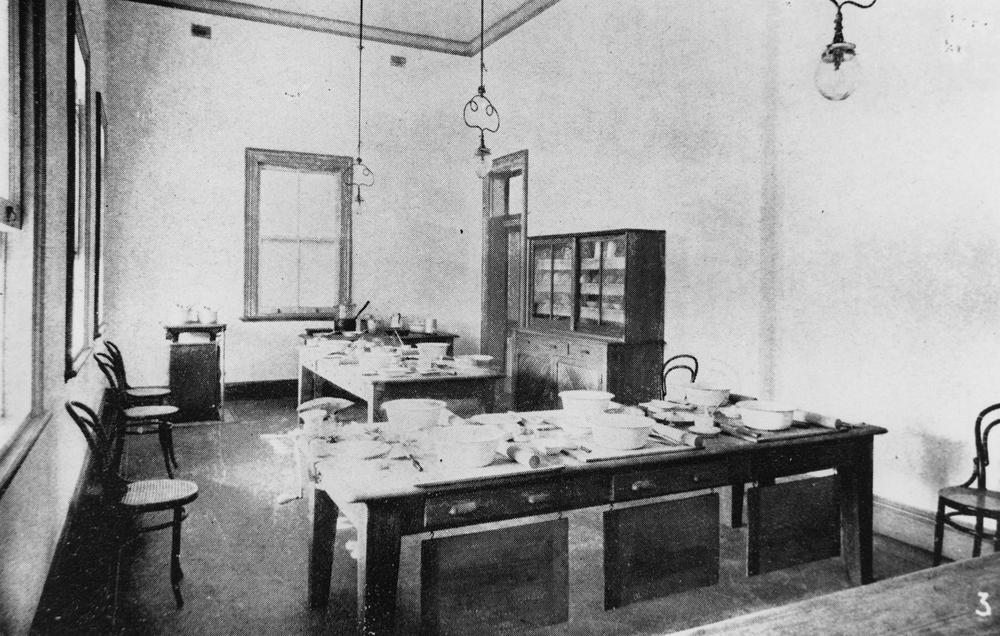
Cooking class room, 1909

A plan marking the early layout of the Technical College Building shows it as an L-shaped, two storey structure, with the primary entrance facing east and a secondary entrance to the south. An L-shaped verandah, sheltered by a skillion roof, wrapped around the rear (northwest) of the building at ground level, and a roof lantern provided natural light to the southern classrooms on the first floor. The eastern and southern elevations were each approximately symmetrical and were divided into bays by tall pilasters. The parapets of the central bays were taller than those of the other bays; and the parapet in the centre of the eastern elevation featured the words "TECHNICAL COLLEGE". At the time the Technical College Building opened, Mount Morgan's population was approaching its peak of 13,000 reached in 1910.

Dramatic reform of the Queensland education system began around 1909 and continued until the beginning of World War I. During this period a high school system was introduced, technical education was expanded, the University of Queensland was inaugurated, a teachers' training college was established, the requirement for a local contribution towards construction costs for new schools was abolished, and the school leaving age was increased from 12 to 14 years. Although technically compulsory since 1875, school attendance was not enforced until 1900. Subsequently, student numbers rose across Queensland during the first 15 years of the 20th century.

In Queensland, governments were slow to establish state secondary education, considering it to be of little relevance to Queensland's economy which was based on primary industries. The Grammar Schools Act 1860 provided scholarships for high-achieving students to attend elite grammar schools, although few were awarded. It was not until 1912 that the government instituted a high school system, whereby separate high schools were established in major towns or, where the student population was too small, a primary school was expanded to include a "high top". In Queensland generally, high schools remained few in number until after World War II.

The first high schools were established within existing technical colleges, utilising their buildings. This was the case in Mount Morgan when, on 12 February 1912, Mount Morgan State High School opened in the Technical College Building as one of the six first state high schools in Queensland. Opened by Norman F White, Chairman of the Board and Chief Engineer for the Mount Morgan Gold Mining Company Limited, the high school initially enrolled 87 pupils. The Technical College continued to operate in the building.

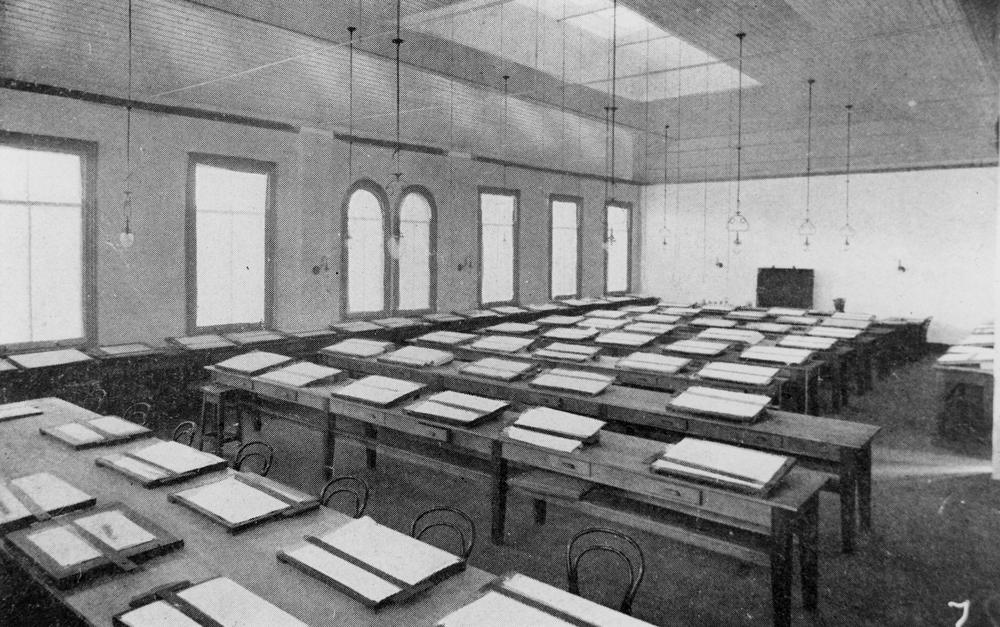
Drawing Class Room, 1909

To accommodate the transition from a technical college to a shared facility, the interior of the Technical College Building at Mount Morgan was altered. A 1912 plan, signed off by Thomas Pye, the Deputy Government Architect at the time, shows these changes. Ground floor alterations included: a new partition of glazed shutters and centre-pivoting fanlights added to a southern classroom; a new screen added to the northeastern classroom to accommodate a classroom and "Typewriting and Shorthand Classroom"; and the "Hat and Cloak Room" was converted into a corridor. On the first floor a gangway was constructed over the staircase; the museum adjacent to the stair landing was partitioned off and converted into a library; and the southern, main lecture hall was divided by partly-glazed partitions to create a classroom, dressmaking room and machine drawing classroom. The plan also shows a timber-framed domestic science scullery and ladies cloak room added to the northern end of the rear verandah, and an L-shaped balcony added to the first floor.

From their introduction, the design of high school buildings was the responsibility of the Department of Public Works. The first purpose-built high school buildings were constructed in 1917 and were large, elaborate buildings that were variations of a standard design introduced in 1914, as well as vocational buildings built to standard designs.

The Government Technical Schools Act had been passed in 1908, allowing for the establishment of vocational education-based studies in Queensland schools. Mount Morgan State High School reflects this integration of technical education into the state school system. A Workshops Building (later Science Block and Workshop and now known as Block B), constructed in 1913, had this purpose. The Workshops Building, a single-storey, masonry structure with a Dutch-gable roof, was constructed in the northwestern corner of the site and was primarily accessed from the east. Its interior was divided into two spaces – a blacksmith's shop to the north and a machine shop to the south – which were connected by a set of dual doors. Each space had a western teachers room that flanked the central dividing wall, and a chimney protruded from the northern end of the building.

By 1913, the school site included the Technical College Building, the Workshops Building, a residence, a large shed and a reservoir.

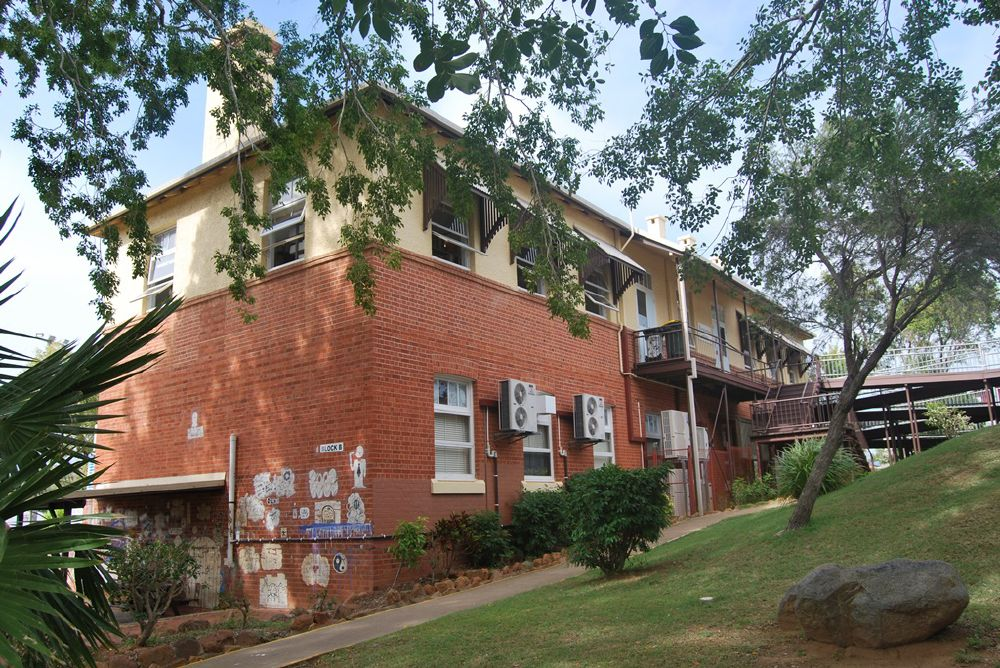
Former Science Block and Workshop from north-west, 2015

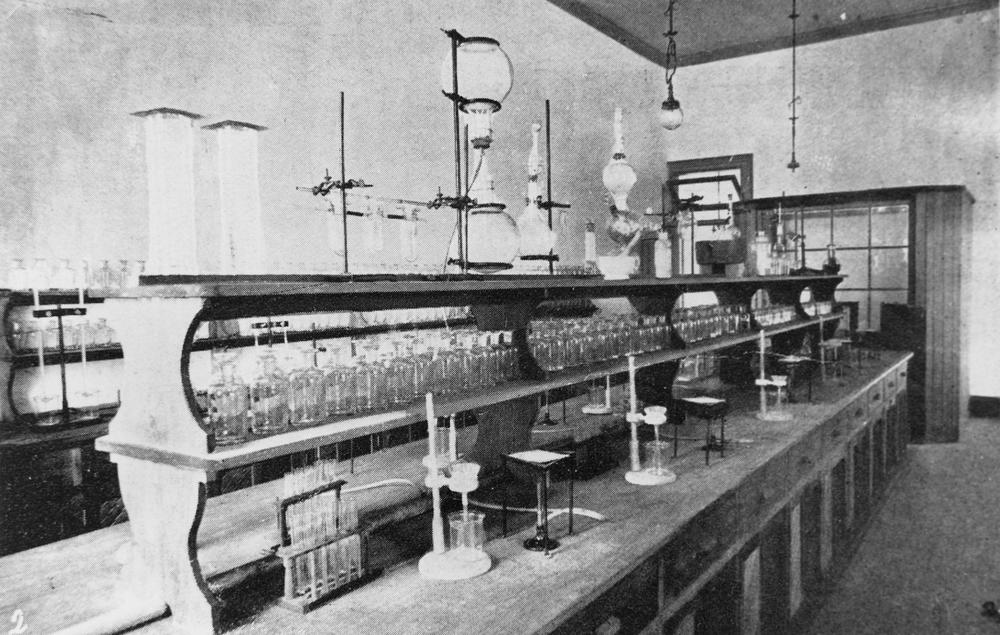
Inside Mount Morgan Technical College's laboratory, 1909

In February 1918 the Department of Public Works decided to add another story to the Science Block and Workshop. The estimated cost was £2550 and the work was performed by day labour. The ground floor was converted from a machine shop and blacksmiths' shop to a drawing room and classrooms. The first floor addition provided a lecture room, a classroom, a physics laboratory, a chemical laboratory and offices. It was accessed via a set of exterior stairs, in the centre of the eastern elevation, and the original Dutch-gable roof was refixed atop the addition.

In 1923 plans were drawn for extension of the domestic science scullery to its west to include a laundry. The locations of some lightweight interior partitions within the Technical College Building were also altered. Also at this time, the library was moved to the southern end of the first floor; and its former location was converted into a principal's room. In conjunction with this work, completion of 'improvements to the frontages of the college' consisting of "brick and iron fence, steps, gates, etc", designed by a Mr Johns, and a reinforced concrete retaining wall, running north along the Central Street (Burnett Highway) boundary, were constructed in 1924. The brick fence runs along the site boundary, in the southeastern corner of the site. It frames the Technical College Building and flanks a set of tapered stairs that lead to the building's eastern entrance.

The late 1920s brought unemployment to Mount Morgan. The Mount Morgan Gold Mining Company went into voluntary liquidation in 1927 and its machinery was sold. However, former mine manager, Adam Alexander Boyd, raised sufficient funds to register a company, Mount Morgan Limited, in June 1929, to exploit the Mount Morgan ore reserves. Initially income was derived from recovering copper from water in the mine, but falling copper prices and a lack of finance, combined with the onset of the Great Depression in 1929, meant that liquidation again looked certain.

In the same period, educational changes occurred. In December 1928, the Mount Morgan Technical College was brought under the control of the Department of Public Instruction, and in 1929 Mount Morgan Intermediate School opened on the site of the high school and technical college.

Mount Morgan Mine began open-cut gold mining in 1932. In that year the Queensland Government decided to subsidise the gold mining industry as part of a scheme to increase employment. This government initiative came at a crucial time for the future of Mount Morgan Limited. So successful was the mine that, within eight months, the initial loan of £15,000 was repaid and further government assistance was not required.

The re-opening meant there was demand for skilled labour again, so classes resumed at the Technical College and the institution became known as the Mount Morgan High and Intermediate School and Technical College. In 1937, Mount Morgan High School celebrated its Silver Jubilee.

The Mount Morgan campus continued to add vocational buildings. By the 1950s the site had acquired: an assay laboratory at the northeastern end of the site; and a carpenters and trade shop located between the Science Block and Workshop and the residence. A 1954 plan shows the location of various concrete retaining walls – one along the northern end of the eastern boundary and another through the centre of the site, between the Technical College Building and the Science Block and Workshop.

The 1960s brought more change to educational opportunities in Mount Morgan. The Intermediate School closed in 1963 and the Technical College closed in the following year. 1968 marked the end of the Mount Morgan High School Past Pupils Association, established in 1924, which had played an important social role in the community and raised funds for improvements to the high school.

Celebration of Mount Morgan State High School's Diamond Jubilee took place on 15 April 1972 coinciding with the official opening of a new classroom block built by the Education Department. Changes at the Mount Morgan mine, affecting employment, took place from the 1970s. In February 1976, staff numbers at the mine were reduced to below 500. In 1981 open cut mining ended when the ore body was exhausted. Smelting ceased in 1984 but extraction of gold from 28 million tonnes (Mt) of tailings took place from 1982 until November 1990.

During the mine's 108-year life approximately 262 metric tons (258 long tons; 289 short tons) of gold, 37 metric tons (36 long tons; 41 short tons) of silver and 387,000 metric tons (381,000 long tons; 427,000 short tons) of copper were mined at Mount Morgan from underground and open cut operations.

Changes on the school site by 1997 included: the demolition of the residence and large shed, and the construction of a sports storage shed and games area in their place; the construction of various teaching buildings - one over a section of the central concrete retaining wall, and three others at the northwestern end of the site; and a toilet block added to the northeastern corner of the site.

The school grounds have also increased in size. Between 1972 and 1980 land to the west of the Science Block and Workshop was added. A large lot north of Bedsor Street was incorporated in the school site by 1954 and in 2015 it is primarily used for sporting facilities. Part of Bedsor Street was closed in 1985 and the school site was reconfigured into one lot in 2011. The Mount Morgan State High School's centenary was commemorated in 2012, recognising its importance to the town.

In 2015, the former Technical College Building (Block A) is used for administration and teaching purposes, and the former Science Block and Workshop (Block B) is used as a library and resource centre. The Mount Morgan State High School is important to Mount Morgan, having been a focus for the community, and generations of students have been taught there. Since establishment it has been a key social focus for the Mount Morgan community with the grounds and buildings serving as the venue for social events.

== Description ==
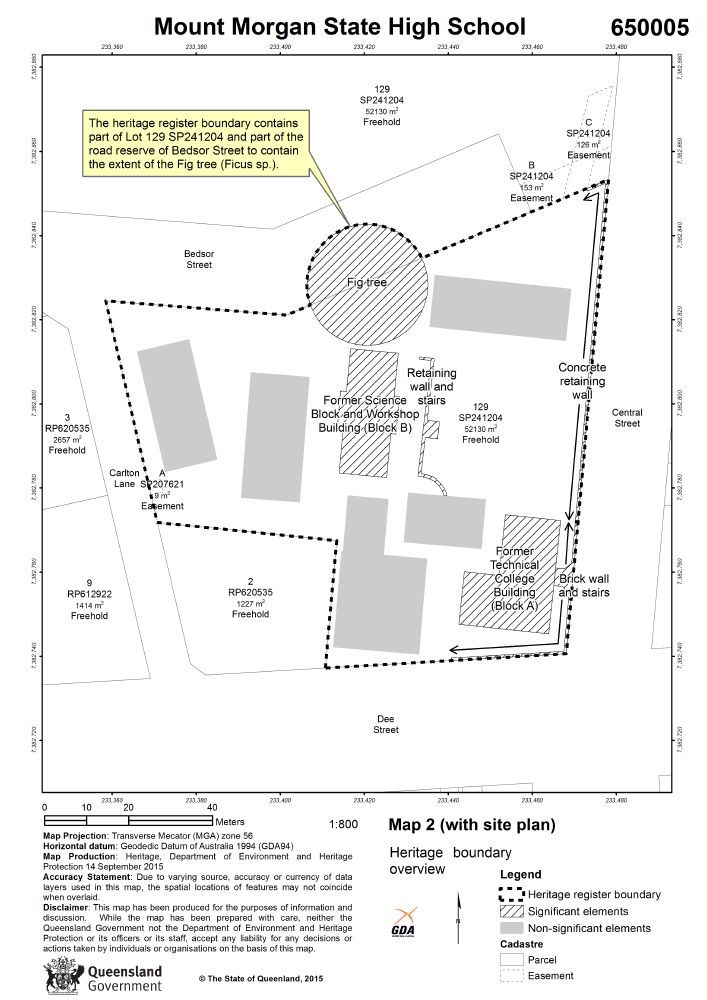
Site map, 2015

Mount Morgan State High School occupies the southern end of a 5.213 hectares (12.88 acres) corner block within the town of Mount Morgan; approximately 32 kilometres (20 mi) southwest of Rockhampton. Facing east, the site is approximately 0.85 hectares (2.1 acres), and slopes gently down towards the eastern boundary of Central Street (Burnett Highway), the main thoroughfare through Mount Morgan. The site is also bounded by Bedsor Street to the north, Carlton Lane to the west, and Dee Street to the south. It contains a complex of buildings, with the earliest structure, the former Technical College Building (Block A) (1908), in the southeastern corner of the site; and the former Science Block and Workshop (Block B) (1913, extended 1918) approximately in the centre of the site. The former Technical College Building, which prominently fronts the Burnett Highway and Dee Street intersection, is a landmark in its setting and makes an important visual contribution to the streetscape. Other significant elements on-site include: a facebrick fence along the eastern and southern site boundaries; tapered entry steps to the former Technical College Building; a rendered masonry retaining wall along the eastern boundary; a concrete retaining wall in the centre of the site; and a mature fig tree.

=== 1908 Former Technical College Building (Block A) ===
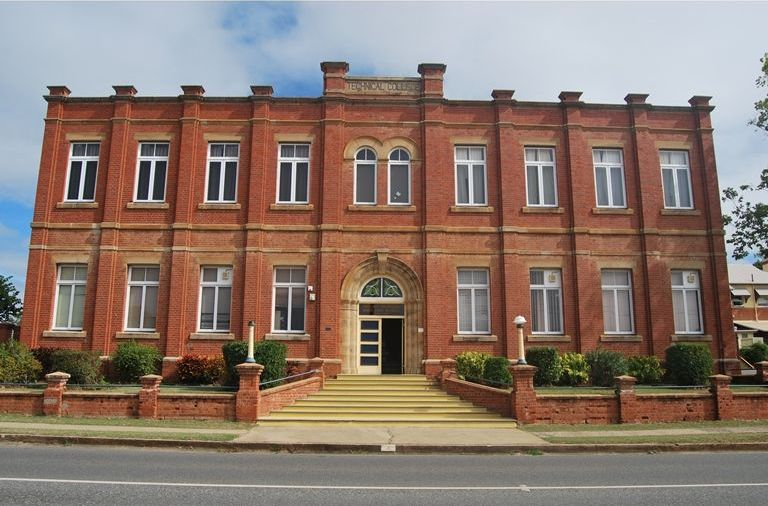
Former Technical College Building, from the east, 2015

The former Technical College Building is a two-storey, masonry structure, with a corrugated metal-clad hipped roof and roof lantern concealed from the street by tall facebrick parapets. It is L-shaped in plan and has a strong street presence derived from its simple and regular massing, grand proportions, and symmetrical composition. An L-shaped ground-floor verandah and first-floor balcony wrap around the rear (northwest) side of the building, providing circulation and access to the interior spaces. A timber-framed, weatherboard-clad former scullery flanks the northwestern end of the verandah and stands on low brick stumps.

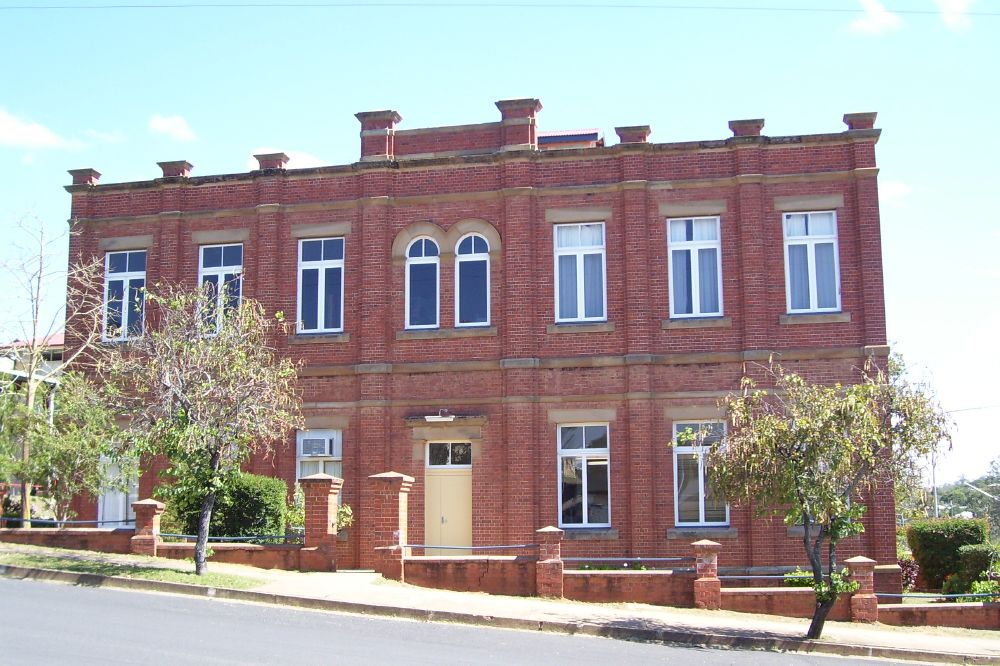
Technical College Building from the south, 2006

The building is elegantly composed of red facebrick walls and pilasters, and sandstone dressings. Its red brickwork is English bond with a light mortar. The street-facing elevations are divided into symmetrical bays by tall facebrick pilasters. The parapets of the central bays on both street-facing elevations are tallest; with the parapet in the centre of the eastern, Burnett Highway elevation featuring the words "TECHNICAL COLLEGE" in render. The building's primary entrance is aligned with this parapet and comprises timber panelled doors with a two-light arched fanlight. It has decorative sandstone surrounds and a keystone inscribed with the date "1908". A secondary entrance is located in the southern, Dee Street elevation. Further access is gained via the rear verandah and balcony.

Most original windows have been replaced with modern aluminium frames. Windows on the eastern and southern elevations are generally casements with two-light fanlights, positioned between brick pilasters; however the central bay windows have arched fanlights, with arched sandstone lintel cappings. Timber-framed, double-hung sashed windows survive in the rear verandah and balcony.

The rear verandah has square timber posts, timber floor boards, a timber battened valance and a decorative timber balustrade of crossed members. The floor-framing of the balcony above forms its ceiling. The balcony has square timber posts with decorative brackets and capitals, timber floor boards, and a raked ceiling with exposed timber structural framing. Most of the balcony's balustrade has been replaced with modern bag-racks, and the timber and metal stairs on the northern and northwestern elevations are recent additions.

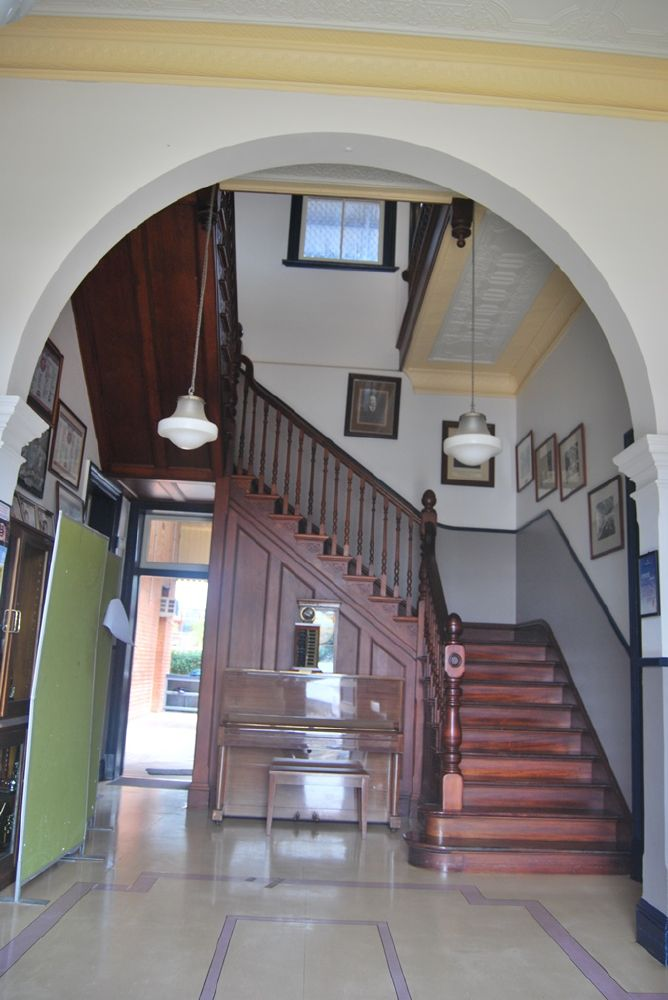
Entry foyer, 2015

Internally, the ground floor layout comprises a central foyer with long, narrow classrooms (formerly cookery and typewriting spaces) to the north, administration spaces and classrooms (formerly secretary and board room, and classroom) to the south, and a large classroom (formerly two classrooms) to the southwest. This southwestern classroom retains an early, glazed bulkhead partition in the centre of the space, supported by a cast iron column.

The first floor is reached by a central cedar staircase with a decorative balustrade. This is flanked on the first floor to the east by office space (formerly library), to the north by long and narrow classrooms, and to the south and southwest by classrooms (formerly machine drawing classroom, dressmaking room and classroom). The south and southwestern classrooms retain early partitions that are half-glazed and lined with tongue-and-groove (T&G) timber.

Most interior spaces have plastered walls with v-jointed (VJ) timber board ceilings with early fretwork ceiling vents. The first floor lecture room retains its coved ceiling, and the roof lantern is visible in the space. A pressed metal ceiling is featured in the foyer space. Skirtings, cornices and architraves are generally early and of timber. Most skirtings are wide and have a detailed profile. Many early, four-panel doors survive, some of which retain early fanlights. Modern lightweight partitions and recent carpet floor-linings are not of cultural heritage significance.

=== 1913 Former Science Block and Workshop (Block B) ===
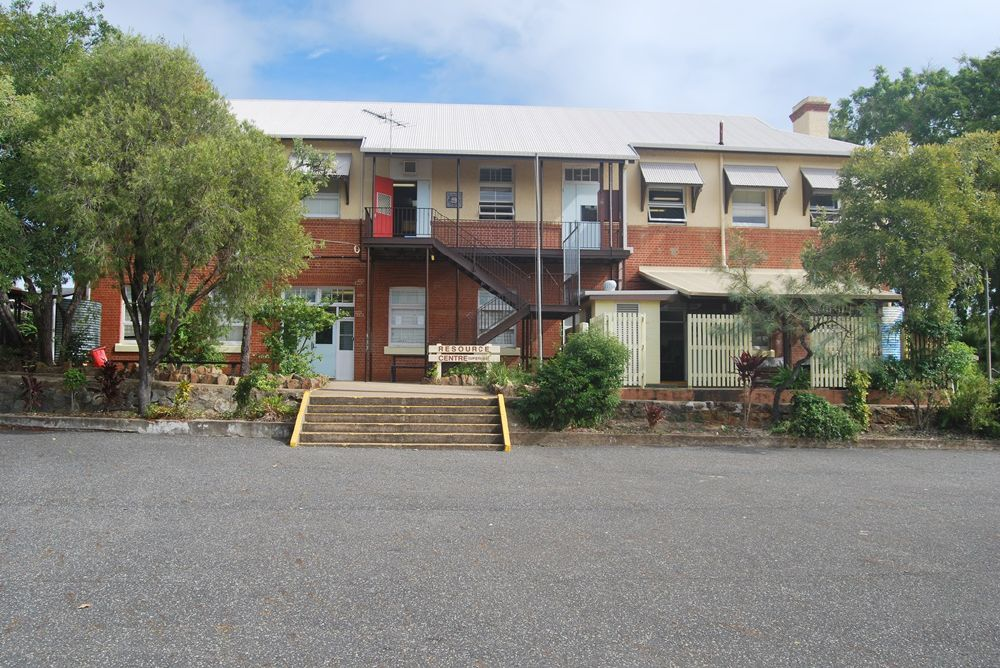
Former Science Block and Workshop, from E, with stone and concrete retaining wall, 2015

The former Science Block and Workshop is a two-storey, masonry structure, with a corrugated metal-clad, Dutch-gable roof. The roof gablets are louvred and a row of masonry chimneys survive on the western (rear) and northern sides. The building has a facebrick lower storey and a facebrick and rendered upper storey – the colour of the facebrick changes between the two storeys, indicating the 1918 first floor addition. A modern steel ramp has been added at the rear. The front (eastern) stair has been replaced in steel and is sheltered by a wide, modern awning.

The majority of modern doors and windows are modern, although most remain within early openings. Several early, multi-light fanlights survive. All window hoods and modern awnings are not of cultural heritage significance.

The interior of both the ground and first floors are primarily divided into two large spaces by a central, brick wall (now painted). Most walls are painted brick or are lined in flat sheeting. The ceilings of the ground floor level are plaster and those on the first floor are T&G timber boards. Square lattice ceiling vents survive on the first floor. Skirtings are generally simple timber of a simple profile, and cornices are rounded plaster. Lightweight modern partitions and modern carpet floor-linings are not of cultural heritage significance.

=== Grounds and landscape features ===
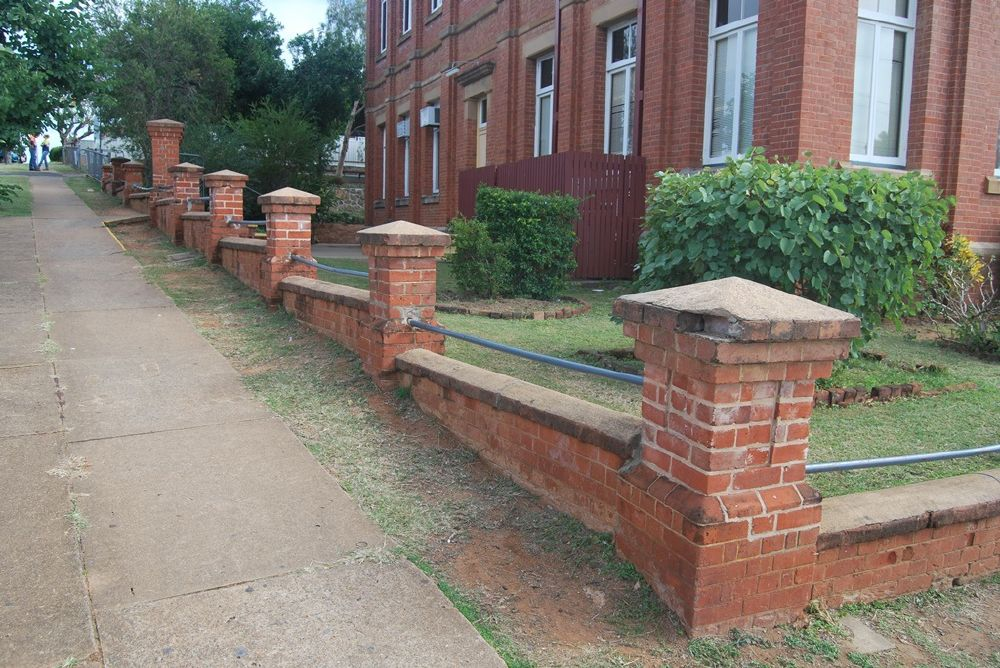
Brick fencing, 2015

The school grounds are well established with a variety of mature trees. A large, mature fig tree (Ficus sp.) is located north of the former Science Block and Workshop.

A red facebrick fence (c. 1924–54) surrounds the former Technical College Building on the south and east sides. It consists of pillars, linked by walls and metal bars – both the pillars and walls have concrete caps. The fence frames the main entrance of the school; running adjacent to a tapered stair that leads to the eastern entrance of the former Technical College Building. Early cast iron lamps are located on two pilasters either side of the stair.

A rendered masonry retaining wall (1924) adjoins the northern end of the brick fence, and runs along the eastern boundary. Stone and concrete retaining walls (pre-1954), with a central stair, also survive east of the former Science Block and Workshop.

Through its prominent corner location, large scale and limited material palette, the former Technical College Building has landmark attributes and makes an important contribution to the Burnett Highway streetscape.

Expansive views to both the Mount Morgan Mine Site and the surrounding townscape are obtained from within the school grounds and from the school buildings.

== Heritage listing ==
Mount Morgan State High School was listed on the Queensland Heritage Register on 4 December 2015 having satisfied the following criteria.

The place is important in demonstrating the evolution or pattern of Queensland's history.

Mount Morgan State High School is important in demonstrating the evolution of state and technical education and its associated architecture in Queensland. The place retains: an excellent example of a purpose-designed Technical College Building (1908), which was erected to facilitate the training of a skilled workforce for Mount Morgan's mine; and a Department of Public Works-designed Science Block and Workshop (1913, extended 1918), which was an architectural response to prevailing government educational philosophies.

Constructed during the first two decades of the 20th century, Mount Morgan State High School is also important in demonstrating the significance of mining in colonial and early 20th century Queensland. Mount Morgan was a major mining area, which is reflected in the quality and size of the Technical College Building and the Science Block and Workshop.

Mount Morgan State High School, as one of the first six state high schools in Queensland, is important in demonstrating the pattern of development of secondary education in Queensland. The school also demonstrates the way secondary and technical education were interlinked in the early 20th century, with secondary classes often established at technical colleges.

The place is important in demonstrating the principal characteristics of a particular class of cultural places.

Mount Morgan State High School is important in demonstrating the principal characteristics of a Queensland technical college complex from the early 20th century, with later modifications. Technical college complexes were custom-designed, and typically featured separate buildings for specialist departments. Significant buildings at Mount Morgan State High School are a substantial Technical College Building (1908) and a former Science Block and Workshop (1913, extended 1918). The buildings are set within a landscaped site that includes mature shade trees and retaining walls.

The Technical College Building, designed in the office of the Mount Morgan Gold Mining Company, is an excellent, intact example of a Queensland technical college building from the early 1900s. It is a large, masonry structure with contrasting decorative capping and lintels; built in a confident and stripped classical style; with grand and imposing street-facing elevations; and sited in a prominent location within the grounds. The interior layout is functional, with a variety of classroom configurations designed for specialist classes.

The former Science Block and Workshop is a good example of a vocational workshop building constructed for a specialist technical college department. Located away from the main Technical College Building to minimise noise disruption, the building is of masonry construction, has plainer finishes than the Technical College Building, and features chimneys that were associated with workshop furnaces.

The place is important because of its aesthetic significance.

Highly intact, the Technical College Building at Mount Morgan State High School is important for its aesthetic significance due to its expressive attributes, landmark presence and streetscape contribution.

The building's symmetrically composed design, ordered street elevations, contrasting high-quality materials (stone and red facebrick), and assertive massing denote a place of learning and stability. Through its size, symmetry, form, materials and siting on a prominent corner along the Burnett Highway, it asserts a landmark presence in the townscape.

The place has a strong or special association with a particular community or cultural group for social, cultural or spiritual reasons.

Schools and technical colleges have always played an important part in Queensland communities. They typically retain significant and enduring connections with former pupils, parents, and teachers; provide a venue for social interaction and volunteer work; and are a source of pride, symbolising local progress and aspirations.

Mount Morgan State High School has a strong and ongoing association with the Mount Morgan community. Established in 1908 with the fundraising efforts of the local community, generations of Mount Morgan students have been taught there. The place is important for its contribution to the educational development of Mount Morgan and is a prominent community focal point and gathering place for social and commemorative events with widespread community support.

== See also ==
- History of state education in Queensland
- List of schools in Central Queensland
