= Mount Morgan Central State School =

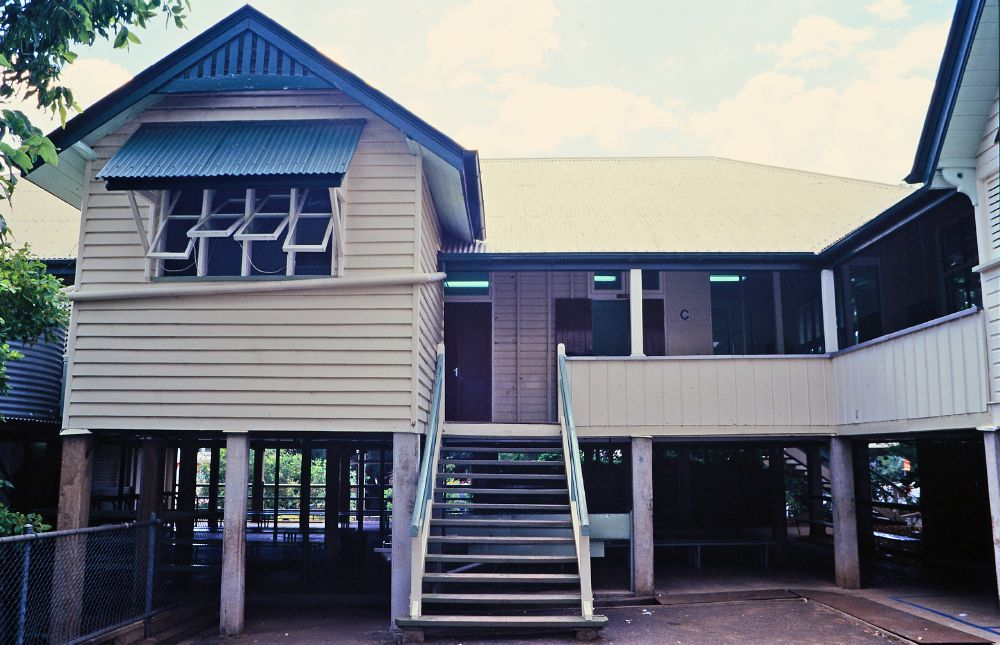
- Mount Morgan Central State School, 2001

- Location within Queensland Location within Australia
- 23.646°S 150.3883°E
- Location: 44 Morgan Street, Mount Morgan, Rockhampton Region, Queensland, Australia

History
- Design period: 1870s–1890s (late 19th century)
- Built: 1887–1997

Queensland Heritage Register
- Official name: Central State School, Boys School
- Type: state heritage (built)
- Designated: 21 October 1992
- Reference no.: 600747
- Significant period: 1880s–1910s (historical); 1880s–1890s (fabric blocks A B C E); 1880s–ongoing (social)
- Significant components: school/school room

Central State School is a heritage-listed state school at 44 Morgan Street, Mount Morgan, Rockhampton Region, Queensland, Australia. It was built from 1887 to 1997. It is also known as Boys School. It was added to the Queensland Heritage Register on 21 October 1992.

== History ==
The Central State School at Mount Morgan was opened in 1887 with an enrolment of 58 pupils, but this number rapidly grew and the first extension was begun the following year. Other buildings have been added as the school continued to expand. Both boys and girls have been taught at the school except during the period 1898–1930 when a separate girls' and infants' school operated elsewhere.

The township of Mount Morgan grew with the establishment of what was to become the richest gold mine in the world. Although small mining claims occurred before 1882, the three Morgan Brothers pegged claims which encompassed most of the mountain top in that year. In July they formed a partnership with three Rockhampton businessmen before selling out to them 1886 when the Mount Morgan Gold Mining Company Limited was formed. The township quickly developed, establishing infrastructure for the rapidly increasing population. The company continued until 1929 when a new company was formed which continued to produce gold and copper until it closed in 1990.

Land was set aside for a school soon after Mount Morgan was surveyed in 1884. In 1870 Queensland had become the first colony to provide free primary education. A Royal Commission on Education in Queensland was set up in 1874 and resulted in a State Education Act which took effect from 1 January 1876 and provided for a Department of Public Instruction under a minister and a system of State primary schools. The government provided a teacher and books, but expected communities with more than 30 potential pupils to put up a third of the school costs. On 5 May 1885 a public meeting was held in Mount Morgan to discuss obtaining a school for the town. Soon afterwards, an application was made to the Department listing the names of 34 eligible children in the district. Fundraising began and the General Manager of the Gold Mining Company, Wesley Hall, made a major contribution to the money raised.

The first building on the school site was opened on 16 May 1887 with 58 pupils, but within a month enrolments had increased to 115 and an extension was built only a year after the opening. This extension increased accommodation almost threefold, but by May 1888, with the population in Mount Morgan rapidly increasing as the field boomed, enrolments at the school had reached 346 children with a teaching staff of 7. The school was further extended in 1891 and by 1897 had 871 pupils. By this time, not only was the school considered unhealthily overcrowded, but there were concerns expressed about the mixing of the sexes, thought inappropriate at the time. It was decided to build a second school for girls and children of both sexes under 7 years of age. The Girls' and Infants' School was built in Pattison Street and opened in August 1897.

Other schools opened in the district in the 1900s and the Boys' School was extended again with the addition of a new building in 1908. On 1 January 1929 the school became a mixed school again while pupils from grades 6 and 7 moved to the Intermediate School which was later to become the Mount Morgan State High School. In 1946 a building was moved to the site from the closed school at Walter Hall, a suburb of Mount Morgan. This is now D Block. Facilities at the school have continued to expand with the construction of F Block in 1965 and an adventure playground in 1979. G Block was constructed in 1994.

Alterations were made to the 1887 A Block in late 1996–7 to provide better administration facilities and the refurbished building was officially opened on 29 July 1997.

== Description ==
The Central School buildings are grouped on a site which slopes down towards the intersection of Morgan and Central Streets. They are set amongst extensive plantings including mature pine and jacaranda trees.

The main structures comprising the school are timber buildings with gabled, corrugated iron clad roofs, elevated on stumps of varying heights to accommodate the slope of the site. These buildings are linked with verandahs and breezeways. The group is unified by construction techniques, materials and repetition of the same formal elements even if of different detailing.

A Block, which contains the original 1887 school, is now an administration block. The old hat room adjoining the verandah has storage for records and equipment. The wall which was between the classrooms has been opened but the new facilities have otherwise had a minimal impact on the building. It has a coved ceiling and casement windows with transom lights above at one end and louvres along the sides. There is a clerestory style panel along one side of the roof only.

B Block is the extension built in 1888 and contains the library. This has diagonally boarded ceilings supported by decorated trusses into which a clerestory has been set. It is also lit by panels of hopper windows to the verandah.

E Block, an 1891 building, is particularly well detailed. It has pairs of ornate turned brackets under the eaves at the ends of the building and the verandahs are ceiled with boards set diagonally. A small room is set across the verandah from the classrooms on the southern side. The interior is also ceiled with diagonal boards. The west wall has a large panel of windows which are supplemented by banks of glass louvres down both long sides of the building. The building is divided into two rooms, one of which is a classroom and one the music room. The school bell is mounted on the south west corner of the verandah.

C Block, the 1908 building, has three classrooms and verandahs to the north and south sides. The interior has a coved ceiling, beaded board linings and sash windows with hoppers over. This building is now air- conditioned. There is a lunch area under this building and a new shelter shed in the playground built along traditional lines.

D Block, the 1946 building, has three classrooms and is little different from the earlier buildings. It also has single skin timber walls and a corrugated iron clad gabled roof which extends over verandahs to the east and west. Walls to the verandahs have exposed studs and the interior has a coved ceiling, rooms that open into one another and large panels of windows in the end walls.

F Block, built in 1965, has a brick lower floor with a timber upper floor containing classrooms. Block G, built in 1994, is single storey structure with a metal roof and is sympathetic to the older buildings in form, scale and detail.

There is a timber pergola gateway, very domestic in form, over the entry from Central Street and situated behind later concrete fence posts.

== Heritage listing ==
Central State School was listed on the Queensland Heritage Register on 21 October 1992 having satisfied the following criteria.

The place is important in demonstrating the evolution or pattern of Queensland's history.

The Central State School demonstrates the growth of Mount Morgan following the discovery of gold and the opening of the Mount Morgan Mine in 1886. The complex of buildings, constructed and extended since 1887, also demonstrates the development of timber schools in Queensland

The place is important in demonstrating the principal characteristics of a particular class of cultural places.

The buildings comprising the Central School demonstrate the principal characteristics of timber schools, reflecting the ways in which architects of the Works Department have addressed problems of light and ventilation in response to climatic conditions since 1887.

The place is important because of its aesthetic significance.

The site is important for its townscape value, the buildings being unified in material and form to create a visually harmonious group on an important intersection in Mount Morgan.

The place has a strong or special association with a particular community or cultural group for social, cultural or spiritual reasons.

The Central School is important for its connection with the community in and around Mount Morgan as a provider of public education for several generations.

== Gallery ==
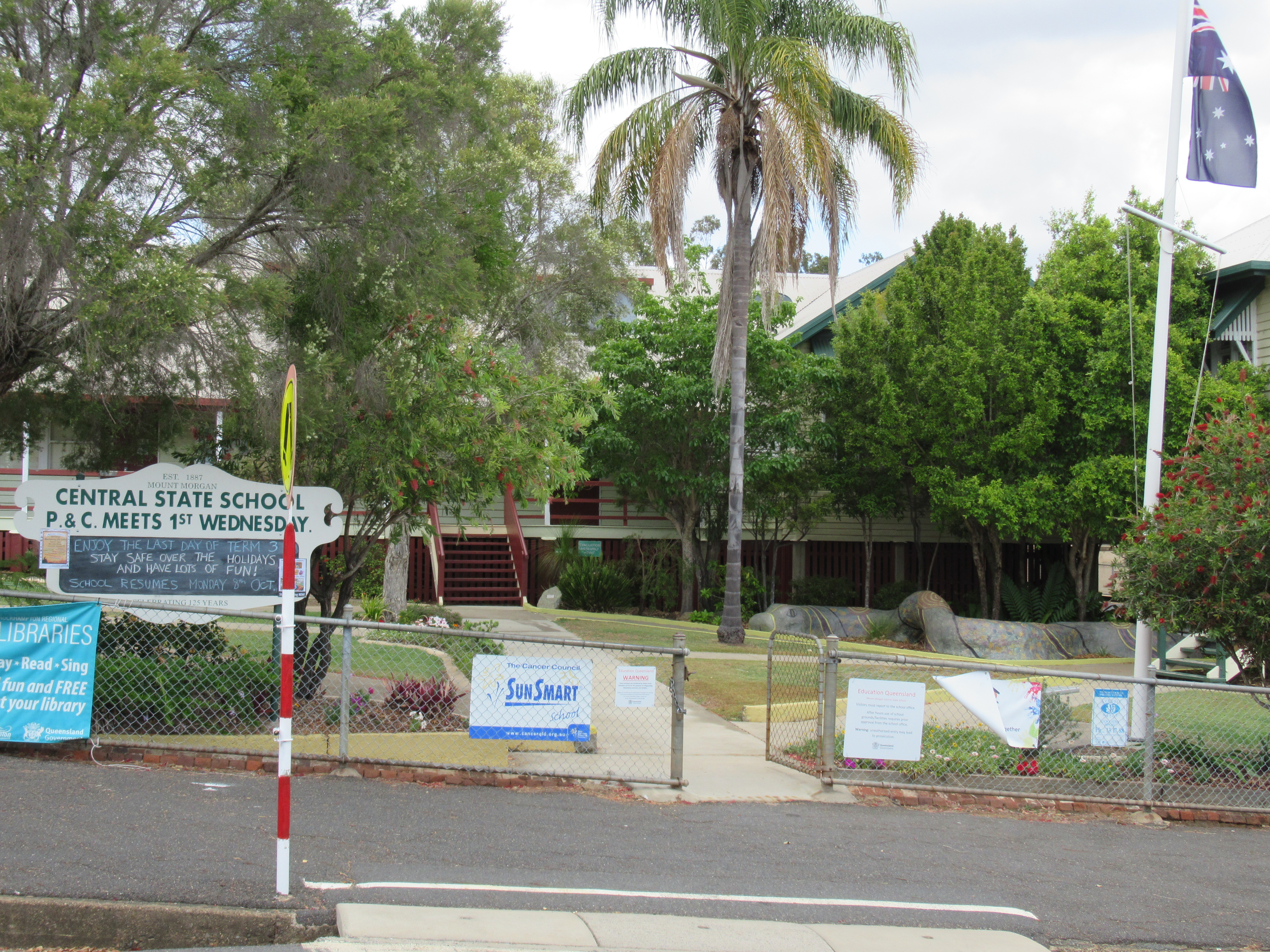
Mount Morgan Central State School entrance, 2018

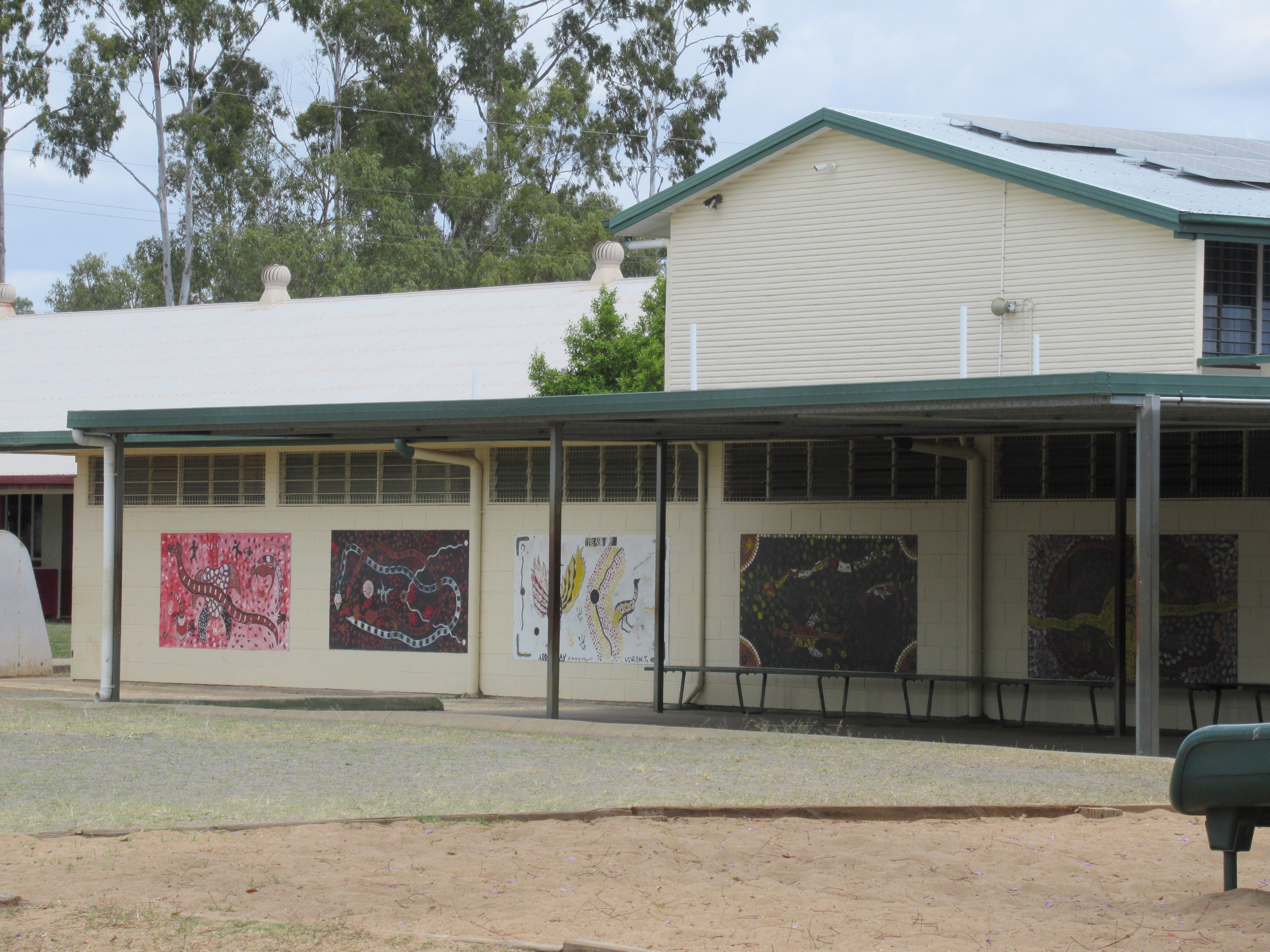
Murals at Mount Morgan Central State School, 2018
