= Roundstone, Queensland =

Roundstone
- Suburb
- Interactive map of Roundstone
- Coordinates: 24.8011°S 149.7522°E
- Country: Australia
- State: Queensland
- LGA: Shire of Banana
- Location: 20.6 km (12.8 mi) WSW of Moura; 85.8 km (53.3 mi) WSW of Biloela; 189 km (117 mi) SW of Rockhampton; 612 km (380 mi) NW of Brisbane

Government
  - State electorate: Callide
  - Federal division: Flynn

Area
  - Total: 814.1 km^{2} (314.3 sq mi)

Population
  - Total: 78 (2021 census)
  - Density: 0.0958/km^{2} (0.2482/sq mi)
- Time zone: UTC+10:00 (AEST)
- Postcode: 4718
Suburbs around Roundstone
Oombabeer	Mimosa; Alberta	Warnoah
Rhydding	Roundstone	Warnoah
Coorada	Glenmoral	Glenmoral

Roundstone is a rural locality in the Shire of Banana, Queensland, Australia. In the 2021 census, Roundstone had a population of 78 people.

== Geography ==
The Dawson Highway enters the locality from the north-east (Moura) and exits to the north-west (Oombabeer/Rhydding). From the highway to the south, the Dawson Range bounds the locality to the east and south-east.

The Roundstone Conservation Park is in the north-west of the locality, immediately north of the highway. The Theodore State Forest is in the south-west of the locality. Apart from these protected areas, the land use is predominantly grazing on native vegetation with some crop growing.

== Demographics ==
In the 2016 census, Roundstone had a population of 43 people.

In the 2021 census, Roundstone had a population of 78 people.

== Education ==
There are no schools in Roundstone. The nearest government primary schools are Moura State School in Moura to the north-east and Theodore State School in Theodore to the south-east. The nearest government secondary schools are Moura State High School (to Year 12) in Moura and Theodore State School (to Year 10). However, students from south-western parts of Roundstone may be too distant for a daily commute to these schools; the alternatives are distance education and boarding school.
