= Glenmoral, Queensland =

Glenmoral
- Suburb
- Interactive map of Glenmoral
- Coordinates: 24.955°S 149.8780°E
- Country: Australia
- State: Queensland
- LGA: Shire of Banana
- Location: 30.1 km (18.7 mi) W of Theodore; 63.2 km (39.3 mi) SW of Moura; 133 km (83 mi) SW of Biloela; 248 km (154 mi) SW of Rockhampton; 574 km (357 mi) NW of Brisbane

Government
  - State electorate: Callide
  - Federal division: Flynn

Area
  - Total: 528.0 km^{2} (203.9 sq mi)

Population
  - Total: 55 (2021 census)
  - Density: 0.1042/km^{2} (0.2698/sq mi)
- Time zone: UTC+10:00 (AEST)
- Postcode: 4719
Suburbs around Glenmoral
| Roundstone | Roundstone | Warnoah; Kianga |
| Coorada | Glenmoral | Lonesome Creek |
| Ghinghinda | Isla | Isla |

Glenmoral is a rural locality in the Shire of Banana, Queensland, Australia. In the 2021 census, Glenmoral had a population of 55 people.

== Geography ==
The Leichhardt Highway runs past the eastern extremity, near Theodore.

== Demographics ==
In the 2016 census, Glenmoral had a population of 53 people.

In the 2021 census, Glenmoral had a population of 55 people.

== Education ==
The nearest government primary and secondary school is Theodore State School (to Year 10) in Theodore to the east. For schooling to Year 12, the nearest government secondary school is Moura State High School in Moura to north, but it may be too distant for a daily commute for students living in the west of Glenmoral; the alternatives are distance education and boarding school.
