= Tarramba, Queensland =

Tarramba
- Suburb
- Interactive map of Tarramba
- Coordinates: 24.6172°S 150.2727°E
- Country: Australia
- State: Queensland
- LGA: Shire of Banana
- Location: 43.1 km (26.8 mi) E of Moura; 70.8 km (44.0 mi) SW of Biloela; 174 km (108 mi) SSW of Rockhampton; 601 km (373 mi) NW of Brisbane

Government
  - State electorate: Callide
  - Federal division: Flynn

Area
  - Total: 379.2 km^{2} (146.4 sq mi)

Population
  - Total: 38 (2021 census)
  - Density: 0.1002/km^{2} (0.260/sq mi)
- Time zone: UTC+10:00 (AEST)
- Postcode: 4715
Suburbs around Tarramba
Banana	Banana	Prospect
Banana	Tarramba	Prospect
Banana	Castle Creek	Castle Creek

Tarramba is a rural locality in the Shire of Banana, Queensland, Australia. In the 2021 census, Tarramba had a population of 38 people.

== Geography ==
Tarramba has the following mountains:

- Flat Top Mountain in the north-west of the locality (24.5745°S 150.2346°E), rising to 401 metres (1,316 ft) above sea level
- Mount Breast in the north of the locality (24.5900°S 150.2657°E) 354 metres (1,161 ft)
- Little Uncle Tom in the south-west of the locality (24.6671°S 150.2196°E) 435 metres (1,427 ft)

Tarramba Creek rises in the centre of the locality and meanders to the south of locality where it exits to the locality of Castle Creek and becomes a tributary of Lonesome Creek.

The land use is predominantly grazing on native vegetation with some forestry and crop growing.

== Demographics ==
In the 2016 census, Tarramba had a population of 57 people.

In the 2021 census, Tarramba had a population of 38 people.

== Education ==
There are no schools in Tarramba. The nearest government primary schools are Banana State School in neighbouring Banana to the north-west and Theodore State School in Theodore to the south-west. The nearest government secondary schools are Theodore State School (to Year 10) and Moura State High School (to Year 12) in Moura to the west.
