= Camboon, Queensland =

Camboon
- Suburb
- Interactive map of Camboon
- Coordinates: 25.0027°S 150.3461°E
- Country: Australia
- State: Queensland
- LGA: Shire of Banana
- Location: 20.6 km (12.8 mi) SE of Theodore; 69.4 km (43.1 mi) S of Moura; 126 km (78 mi) SW of Biloela; 247 km (153 mi) SE of Gladstone; 529 km (329 mi) NW of Brisbane

Government
  - State electorate: Callide
  - Federal division: Flynn

Area
  - Total: 1,714.1 km^{2} (661.8 sq mi)

Population
  - Total: 76 (2021 census)
  - Density: 0.04434/km^{2} (0.1148/sq mi)
- Time zone: UTC+10:00 (AEST)
- Postcode: 4719
Suburbs around Camboon
Lonesome Creek	Castle Creek	Thangool; Harrami
Isla	Camboon	Rawbelle
Isla	Cracow	Eidsvold West

Camboon is a rural locality in the Shire of Banana, Queensland, Australia. In the 2021 census, Camboon had a population of 76 people.

== Geography ==
Dingley Dell is a neighbourhood in the north-east of the locality (24.7833°S 150.5666°E).

There are a number of protected areas within the locality:

- Montour State Forest in the north-east of locality (extending into neighbouring Rawbelle to the east)
- Camboon State Forest in the south-east of the locality (extending into neighbouring Cracow to the south)

Apart from the protected areas, the predominant land use is grazing on native vegetation.

Camboon has the following mountains:

- Bald Mountain (24.9907°S 150.2361°E) 410 metres (1,350 ft)
- Dicks Lookout (25.1140°S 150.3240°E) 420 metres (1,380 ft)
- Mount Appenben (24.9158°S 150.2870°E) 406 metres (1,332 ft)
- Mount Coangal (25.0236°S 150.4142°E) 499 metres (1,637 ft)
- Mount Kable (25.0658°S 150.3633°E) 500 metres (1,600 ft)
- Mount Kandoonan (24.9719°S 150.4268°E) 546 metres (1,791 ft)
- Mount Mungungal (25.0823°S 150.4040°E) 568 metres (1,864 ft)
- Mount Okangal (25.0138°S 150.2837°E) 540 metres (1,770 ft)
- Mount Ox (25.0685°S 150.1736°E) 326 metres (1,070 ft)
- Mount Shirley (25.1369°S 150.3042°E) 380 metres (1,250 ft)

== History ==
The name Camboon is believed to be derived from the Aboriginal word caamboon meaning the bullrushes growing at the edge of waterholes.

On Tuesday 7 May 1868, the Queensland Government auctioned 32 town lots, each 2 roods (0.50 acres; 0.20 ha), in the town of Camboon. The town site was at 25.0335°S 50.4338°E, near the head station of the Camboon pastoral run.

A post office opened on 1 June 1874. It closed on 16 October 1965.

Camboon Provisional School opened about 1899 but closed in 1908 due to low enrolments. In 1910, the school was reopened but only operated half-time in conjunction with the newly opened Camboon Woolshed Provisional School. Both schools were closed in 1915.

Clare Provisional School opened on 19 July 1921. Newestella Provisional School opened on 29 August 1921. The two schools were operated as half-time schools in conjunction (meaning that they shared a teacher between them). Both schools closed in December 1923 due to low student numbers.

== Demographics ==
In the 2016 census, Camboon had a population of 93 people.

In the 2021 census, Camboon had a population of 76 people.

== Education ==
There are no schools in Camboon. The nearest government primary schools are Theodore State School in Theodore to the west and Thangool State School in neighbouring Thangool to the north-east. The nearest government secondary schools are Theodore State School (to Year 10), Biloela State High School in Biloela to the north and Moura State High School in Moura to the north-west. However, the distances to these schools may be too far for a daily commute from some parts of the locality; distance education and boarding schools are the other options.

== Events ==
Camboon hosts an annual campdraft every May.
