= Ghinghinda, Queensland =

Ghinghinda
- Suburb
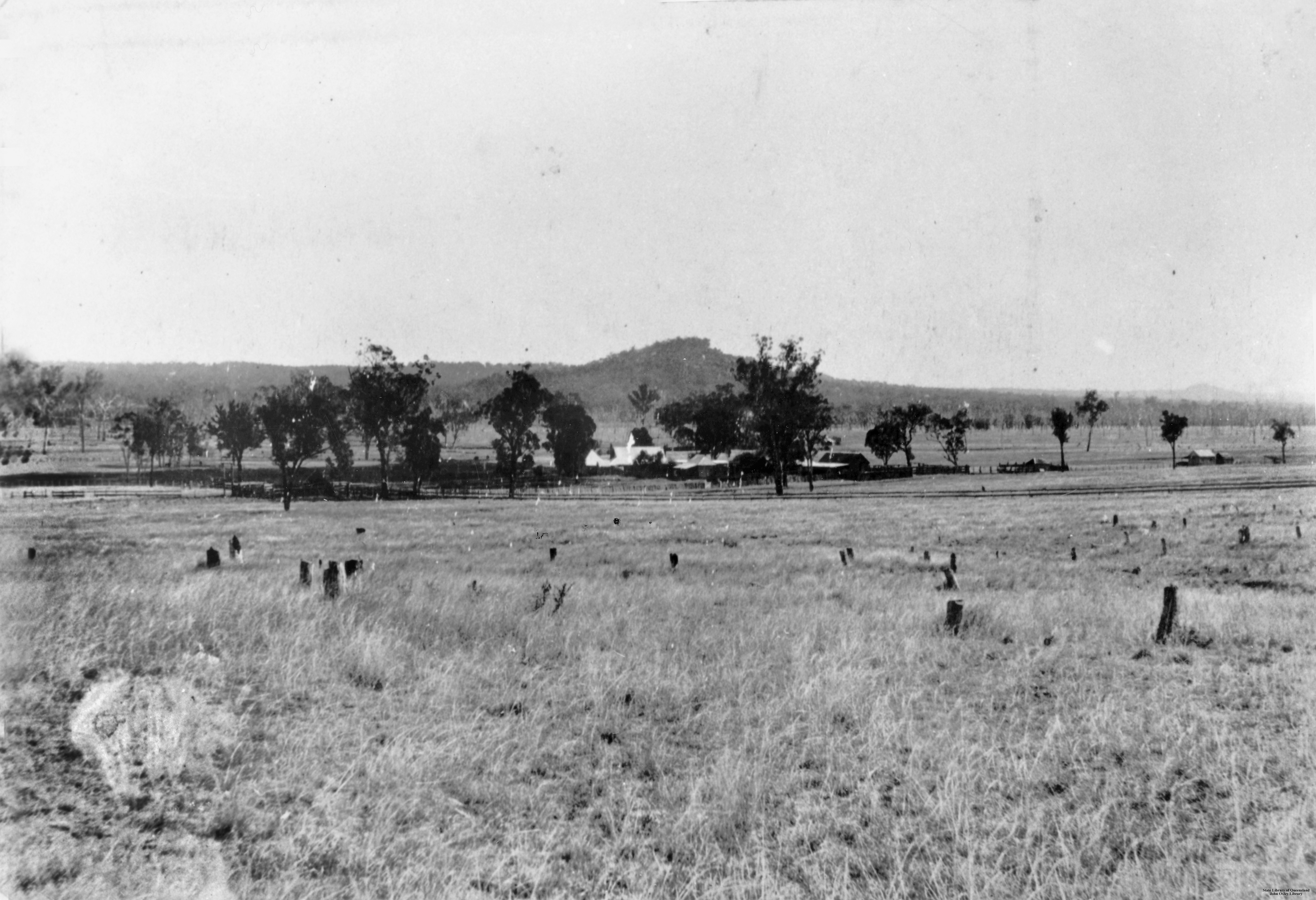
- Ghinghinda pastoral station, circa 1899

- Interactive map of Ghinghinda
- Coordinates: 25.2061°S 149.7638°E
- Country: Australia
- State: Queensland
- LGA: Shire of Banana
- Location: 44.0 km (27.3 mi) SW of Theodore; 70.4 km (43.7 mi) N of Taroom; 147 km (91 mi) SW of Biloela; 250 km (160 mi) SSW of Rockhampton; 536 km (333 mi) NW of Brisbane

Government
  - State electorate: Callide
  - Federal division: Flynn

Area
  - Total: 1,227.8 km^{2} (474.1 sq mi)

Population
  - Total: 47 (2021 census)
  - Density: 0.0383/km^{2} (0.0991/sq mi)
- Time zone: UTC+10:00 (AEST)
- Postcode: 4420
Suburbs around Ghinghinda
Glenhaughton	Coorada	Glenmoral
Gwambegwine	Ghinghinda	Isla
Gwambegwine	Taroom	Spring Creek

Ghinghinda is a rural locality in the Shire of Banana, Queensland, Australia. In the 2021 census, Ghinghinda had a population of 47 people.

== Geography ==
The locality is bounded to the south-west by Palm Tree Creek and to the south and south-east by the Gilbert Range (25.4333°S 149.9°E).

The Leichhardt Highway enters the locality from the south (Taroom) and exits to the east (Isla). The Fitzroy Developmental Road (also known as Taroom Bauhinia Downs Road, State Route 7) enters the locality from the west (Gwambegwine) and exits to the north (Coorada).

There are numerous protected areas in the locality, including the Theodore State Forest, Mebir State Forest, Tualka State Forest, and Waterstone State Forests 1 and 2. Apart from these, the land use is grazing on native vegetation.

== History ==
The Gilbert Range was named by explorer Ludwig Leichhardt on 14 November 1844, after naturalist John Gilbert who was a member of Leichhardt's 1844 expedition.

In 1862, the pastoral station of Ghinghinda is mentioned as the home of William Kelman, a Commissioner for the Peace.

== Demographics ==
In the 2016 census, Ghinghinda had a population of 36 people.

In the 2021 census, Ghinghinda had a population of 47 people.

== Education ==
There are no schools in Ghinghinda. The nearest government schools are Taroom State School (Prep to Year 10) in neighbouring Taroom to the south and Theodore State School (Prep to Year 10) in Theodore to the north-east. However, students living in the north-west of Ghinghinda would be too distant from these schools for a daily commute. Also, there are no nearby schools offering education to Year 12; the alternatives are distance education and boarding school.
