= Warnoah, Queensland =

Warnoah
- Suburb
- Interactive map of Warnoah
- Coordinates: 24.6872°S 149.9038°E
- Country: Australia
- State: Queensland
- LGA: Shire of Banana
- Location: 11.4 km (7.1 mi) WSW of Moura; 76.5 km (47.5 mi) WSW of Biloela; 180 km (110 mi) SW of Rockhampton; 603 km (375 mi) NW of Brisbane

Government
  - State electorate: Callide
  - Federal division: Flynn

Area
  - Total: 427.2 km^{2} (164.9 sq mi)

Population
  - Total: 84 (2021 census)
  - Density: 0.1966/km^{2} (0.5093/sq mi)
- Time zone: UTC+10:00 (AEST)
- Postcode: 4718
Suburbs around Warnoah
Roundstone	Alberta	Moura
Roundstone	Warnoah	Kianga
Glenmoral	Glenmoral	Kianga

Warnoah is a rural locality in the Shire of Banana, Queensland, Australia. In the 2021 census, Warnoah had a population of 84 people.

== Geography ==
The Dawson River bounds the locality to the east. The Dawson Range bounds the locality to the west and south-west.

The Dawson Highway enters the locality from the north-east (Moura / Kianga) and exits to the north-west (Roundstone).

Roundstone State Forest is in the north-west of the locality. Part of the Dawson River Conservation Park is in the north-east of the locality, extending into neighbouring Moura. Highworth Bend Conservation Park is in the south of the locality. Apart from these protected areas, the land use is predominantly grazing on native vegetation with some crop growing.

== Demographics ==
In the 2016 census, Warnoah had a population of 71 people.

In the 2021 census, Warnoah had a population of 84 people.

== Education ==
There are no schools in Warnoah. The nearest government primary schools are Moura State School in neighbouring Moura to the north-west and Theodore State School in Theodore to the south-east. The nearest government secondary schools are Moura State High School (to Year 12) in Moura and Theodore State School (to Year 10).
