= Castle Creek, Queensland =

Castle Creek
- Suburb
- Interactive map of Castle Creek
- Coordinates: 24.7625°S 150.3386°E
- Country: Australia
- State: Queensland
- LGA: Shire of Banana
- Location: 69.5 km (43.2 mi) SSW of Biloela; 77.6 km (48.2 mi) SW of Moura; 190 km (120 mi) SW of Gladstone; 561 km (349 mi) NW of Brisbane

Government
  - State electorate: Callide
  - Federal division: Flynn

Area
  - Total: 463.7 km^{2} (179.0 sq mi)

Population
  - Total: 57 (2021 census)
  - Density: 0.1229/km^{2} (0.3184/sq mi)
- Time zone: UTC+10:00 (AEST)
- Postcode: 4715
Suburbs around Castle Creek
Tarramba	Prospect	Thangool
Banana	Castle Creek	Camboon
Lonesome Creek	Camboon	Camboon

Castle Creek is a rural locality in the Shire of Banana, Queensland, Australia. In the 2021 census, Castle Creek had a population of 57 people.

== Geography ==
Castle Creek has the following mountains and valleys:

- Mount Tam (Malgoonroo) (24.7548°S 150.2416°E) 483 metres (1,585 ft)
- Gonyelinka Gorge (24.8078°S 150.2139°E)

== Demographics ==
In the 2016 census, Castle Creek had a population of 27 people.

In the 2021 census, Castle Creek had a population of 57 people.

== Education ==
There are no schools in Castle Creek. The nearest government primary schools are:

- Theodore State School in Theodore to the south-east
- Banana State School in neighbouring Banana to the north-west
- Thangool State School in neighbouring Thangool to the north-east

The nearest government secondary schools are:

- Theodore State School (to Year 10) in Theodore to the south-east
- Moura State High School (to Year 12) in Moura to the north-west
- Biloela State High School (to Year 12) in Biloela to the north-east.
