= Spring Creek, Queensland (Banana Shire) =

Spring Creek
- Suburb
- Interactive map of Spring Creek
- Coordinates: 25.3925°S 150.0488°E
- Country: Australia
- State: Queensland
- LGA: Shire of Banana
- Location: 55.3 km (34.4 mi) NE of Taroom; 95.1 km (59.1 mi) S of Theodore; 198 km (123 mi) SSW of Biloela; 319 km (198 mi) SW of Gladstone; 521 km (324 mi) NW of Brisbane

Government
  - State electorate: Callide
  - Federal division: Flynn

Area
  - Total: 489.1 km^{2} (188.8 sq mi)

Population
  - Total: 20 (2021 census)
  - Density: 0.041/km^{2} (0.106/sq mi)
- Time zone: UTC+10:00 (AEST)
- Postcode: 4420
Suburbs around Spring Creek
Ghinghinda	Isla	Isla
Ghinghinda	Spring Creek	Cracow
Taroom	Taroom	Glebe

Spring Creek is a rural locality in the Shire of Banana, Queensland, Australia. In the 2021 census, Spring Creek had a population of 20 people.

== Geography ==
The locality is bounded to the south by the Dawson River. The Glebe Weir (25.4646°S 150.0349°E) impounds the river to the south-west.

Gilbert Range (25.4346°S 149.9037°E) commences in Gwambegwine, continues through Ghinghinda and Taroom, ending in the west of Spring Creek. Mount Moss in the north-east of the locality (25.3643°S 150.0561°E) is 446 metres (1,463 ft) above sea level.

The Precipice National Park (25.3342°S 150.1067°E) occupies the north-east corner of the locality. Apart from the protected area within the national park, the predominant land use is grazing on native vegetation. There is a small amount of crop growing in the south of the locality near the Dawson River with irrigated crops near the weir.

== History ==
The locality was officially named and bounded on 30 April 1999.

Swindle Hill (25.3797°S 150.0869°E) takes its name from a gold mine fraud. In the 1850s some gold had been found in the hill and in the 1862 prospectors dug a shaft but found little gold, so they sold the mine for a profit by "salting" 10 tons of ore with gold to give the impression that the mine was yielding more gold than it was.

Mount Moss Provisional School opened on 28 April 1913 and closed circa 1928.

== Demographics ==
In the 2016 census, Spring Creek had a population of 15 people.

In the 2021 census, Spring Creek had a population of 20 people.

== Economy ==
There are a number of homesteads in the locality, including:

- Spring Creek No 2 (25.4114°S 150.0780°E)
- The Bend (25.5150°S 149.9578°E)

== Education ==
There are no schools in Spring Creek. The nearest government schools are Taroom State School (Prep to Year 10) in neighbouring Taroom to the south-west and Theodore State School (Prep to Year 10) in Theodore to the north. There are no schools nearby that offer secondary education to Year 12. The alternatives are distance education and boarding school.

== Attractions ==
There is a camping ground on the northern bank of the Dawson River beside the Glebe Weir (25.4636°S 150.0338°E) accessed by Glebe Weir Road. There is a boat ramp at the camping ground into the impounded river (25.4642°S 150.0333°E).The camp ground and boat ramp are managed by the Banana Shire Council.
