= Isla, Queensland =

Isla
- Suburb
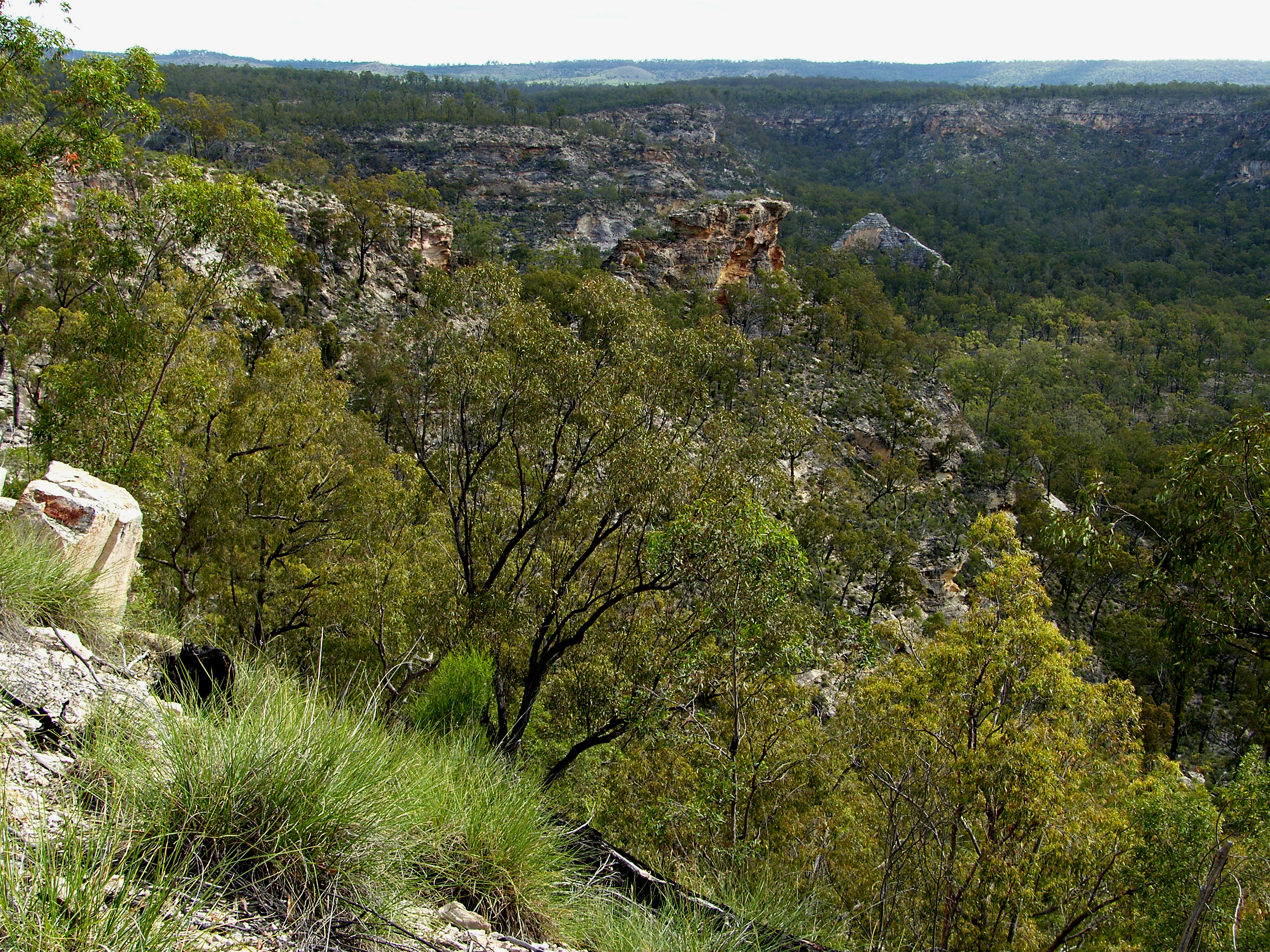
- Isla Gorge National Park, 2007

- Interactive map of Isla
- Coordinates: 25.15°S 150.0333°E
- Country: Australia
- State: Queensland
- LGA: Shire of Banana
- Location: 28.9 km (18.0 mi) SSW of Theodore; 75.4 km (46.9 mi) S of Moura; 132 km (82 mi) SW of Biloela; 235 km (146 mi) SSW of Rockhampton; 534 km (332 mi) NW of Brisbane

Government
  - State electorate: Callide
  - Federal division: Flynn

Area
  - Total: 846.1 km^{2} (326.7 sq mi)

Population
  - Total: 213 (2021 census)
  - Density: 0.2517/km^{2} (0.6520/sq mi)
- Time zone: UTC+10:00 (AEST)
- Postcode: 4719
Suburbs around Isla
Glenmoral	Glenmoral	Theodore; Lonesome Creek
Ghinghinda	Isla	Camboon
Ghinghinda	Spring Creek	Cracow

Isla is a rural locality in the Shire of Banana, Queensland, Australia. In the 2021 census, Isla had a population of 213 people.

== Geography ==
The Dawson River forms the northern and eastern boundaries of the locality. The Dawson Range forms part of the north-western boundary of the locality.

The Leichhardt Highway enters the locality from the south-west (Ghinghinda) and exits to the north-east (Glenmoral/Theodore).

The Isla Gorge National Park is in the west of the locality extending into neighbouring Glenmoral to the north-west. The Devils Nest State Forest is also in the west of the locality. Apart from these protected areas, the land use is predominantly grazing on native vegetation with some crop growing in the north of the locality near the Dawson River.

== Demographics ==
In the 2016 census, Isla had a population of 159 people.

In the 2021 census, Isla had a population of 213 people.

== Education ==
There are no schools in Isla. The nearest government primary and secondary school (to Year 10) is Theodore State School in neighbouring Theodore to the north-east. The nearest government secondary school to Year 12 is Moura State High School in Moura to the north, but it is sufficiently distant that only students living in the north of the locality of Isla could attend; the alternatives are distance education and boarding school.
