= Lonesome Creek, Queensland =

Lonesome Creek
- Suburb
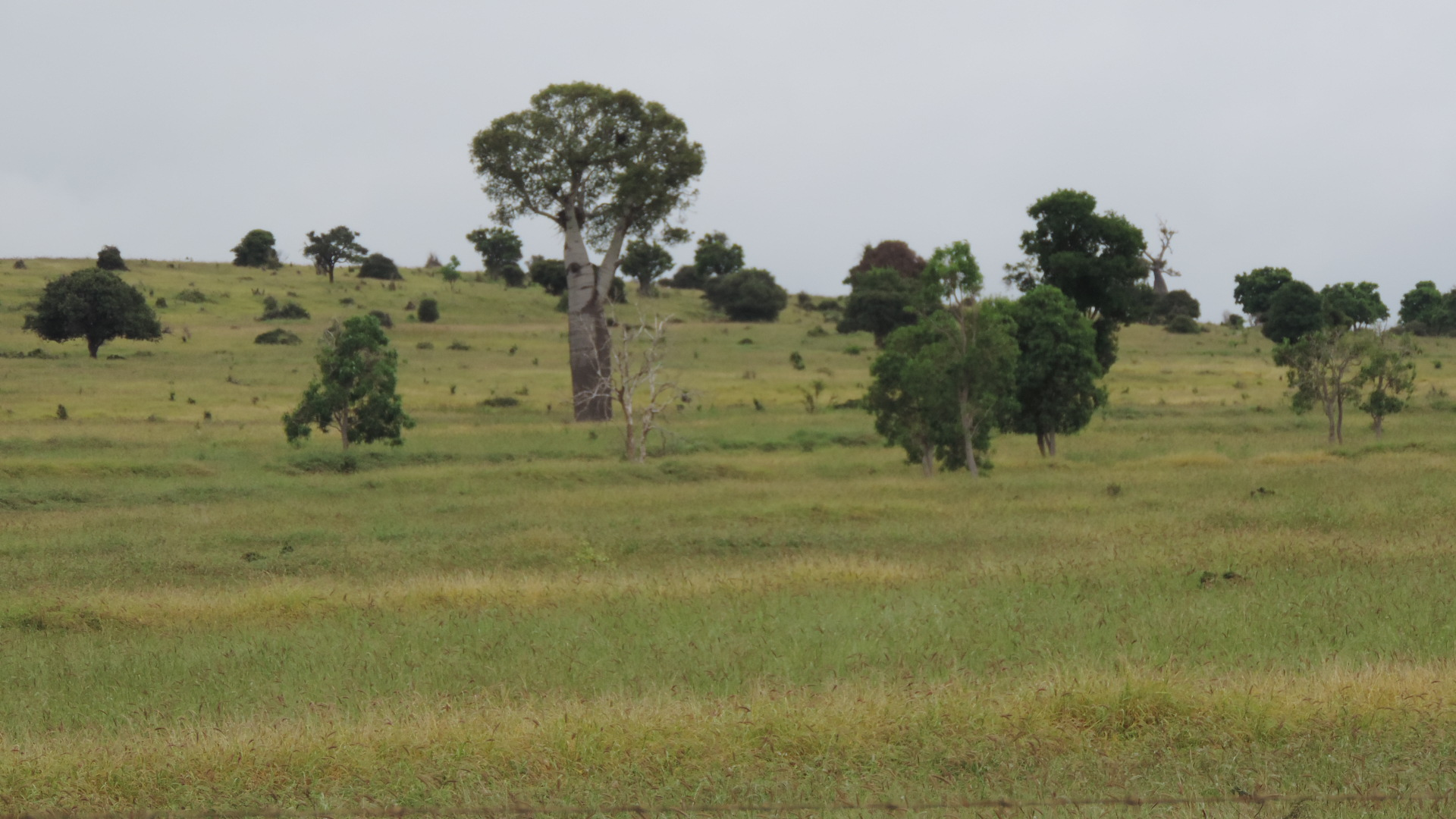
- Rural landscape, Woolthorpe Road, 2014

- Interactive map of Lonesome Creek
- Coordinates: 24.8783°S 150.1072°E
- Country: Australia
- State: Queensland
- City: Theodore
- LGA: Shire of Banana
- Location: 4.7 km (2.9 mi) NNE of Theodore; 51.9 km (32.2 mi) S of Moura; 101 km (63 mi) SW of Biloela; 204 km (127 mi) SW of Rockhampton; 558 km (347 mi) NW of Brisbane

Government
  - State electorate: Callide
  - Federal division: Flynn

Area
  - Total: 241.4 km^{2} (93.2 sq mi)

Population
  - Total: 173 (2021 census)
  - Density: 0.7167/km^{2} (1.856/sq mi)
- Time zone: UTC+10:00 (AEST)
- Postcode: 4719
Suburbs around Lonesome Creek
Kianga	Banana	Castle Creek
Glenmoral	Lonesome Creek	Camboon
Theodore	Isla	Camboon

Lonesome Creek is a rural locality in the Shire of Banana, Queensland, Australia. In the 2021 census, Lonesome Creek had a population of 173 people.

== Geography ==
The locality is bounded in part to the north-east by the Leichhardt Highway, to the east by the creek Castle Creek, to the south-west by the Dawson River, to the west by the Malakoff Range and the creek Lonesome Creek.

The Leichhardt Highway enters the locality from the south-west (Theodore / Isla) and travels north-east through the locality before becoming the north-eastern boundary of the locality and then exiting to the north-east (Banana / Castle Creek).

The creek Lonesome Creek rises in neighbouring locality of Castle Creek to the north-east from where it flows into the locality of Lonesome Creek and crosses the locality to form a short section of its western boundary before flowing south towards Theodore, where it becomes a tributary of the Dawson River (24.93524°S 150.06563°E).

The land use is a mixture of crop growing and grazing on native vegetation and pastures. There is some rural residential housing, mostly on the outskirts of Theodore.

== Demographics ==
In the 2016 census, Lonesome Creek had a population of 170 people.

In the 2021 census, Lonesome Creek had a population of 173 people.

== Education ==
There are no schools in Lonesome Creek. The nearest government primary and secondary school is Theodore State School (Prep to Year 10) in neighbouring Theodore to the south-west. The nearest government secondary school offering schooling to Year 12 is Moura State High School in Moura to the north-west, but the southern parts of Lonesome Creek may be too distant for a daily commute and the alternatives are distance education and boarding school.

== Facilities ==
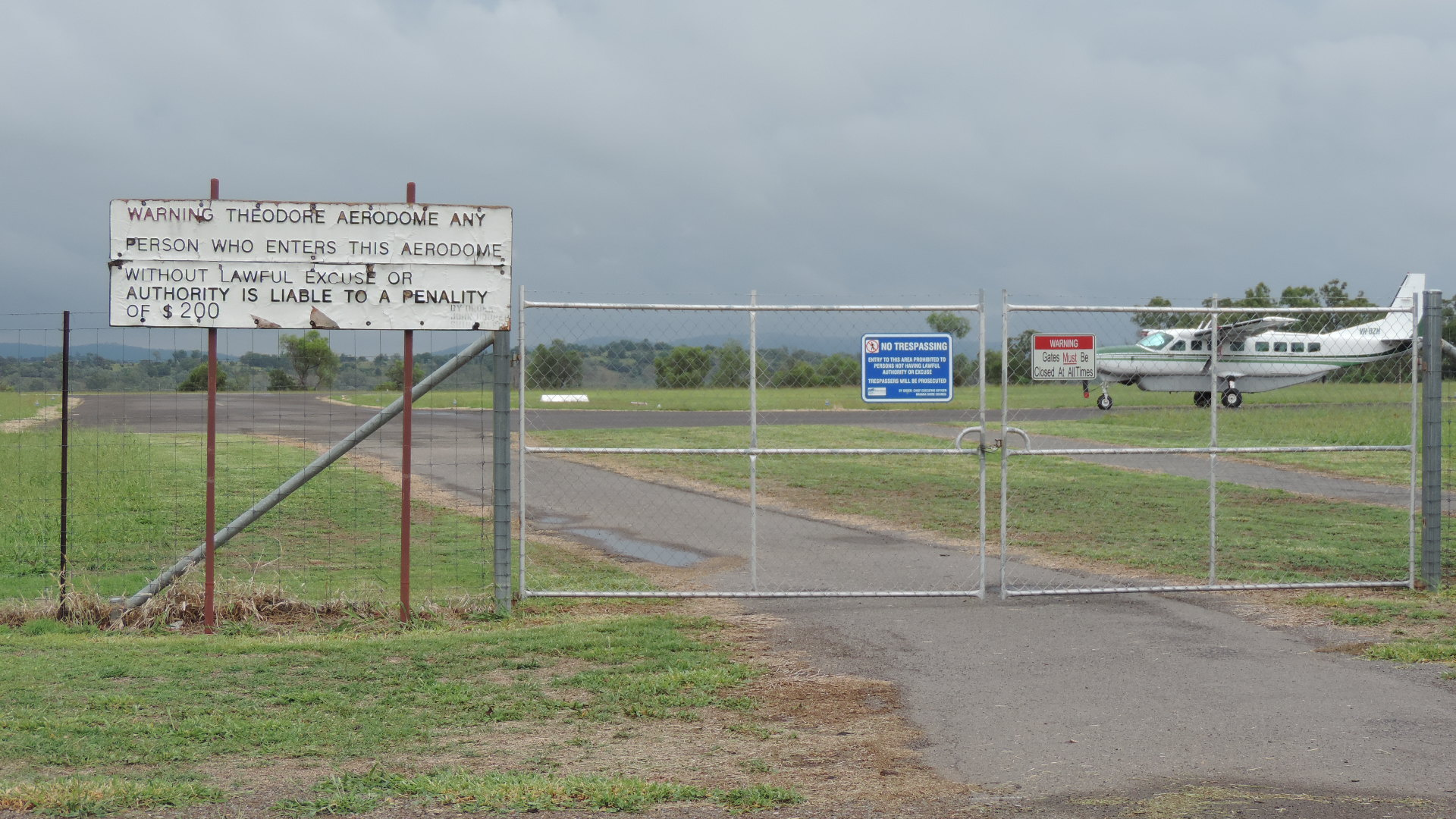
Theodore Airport, 2014

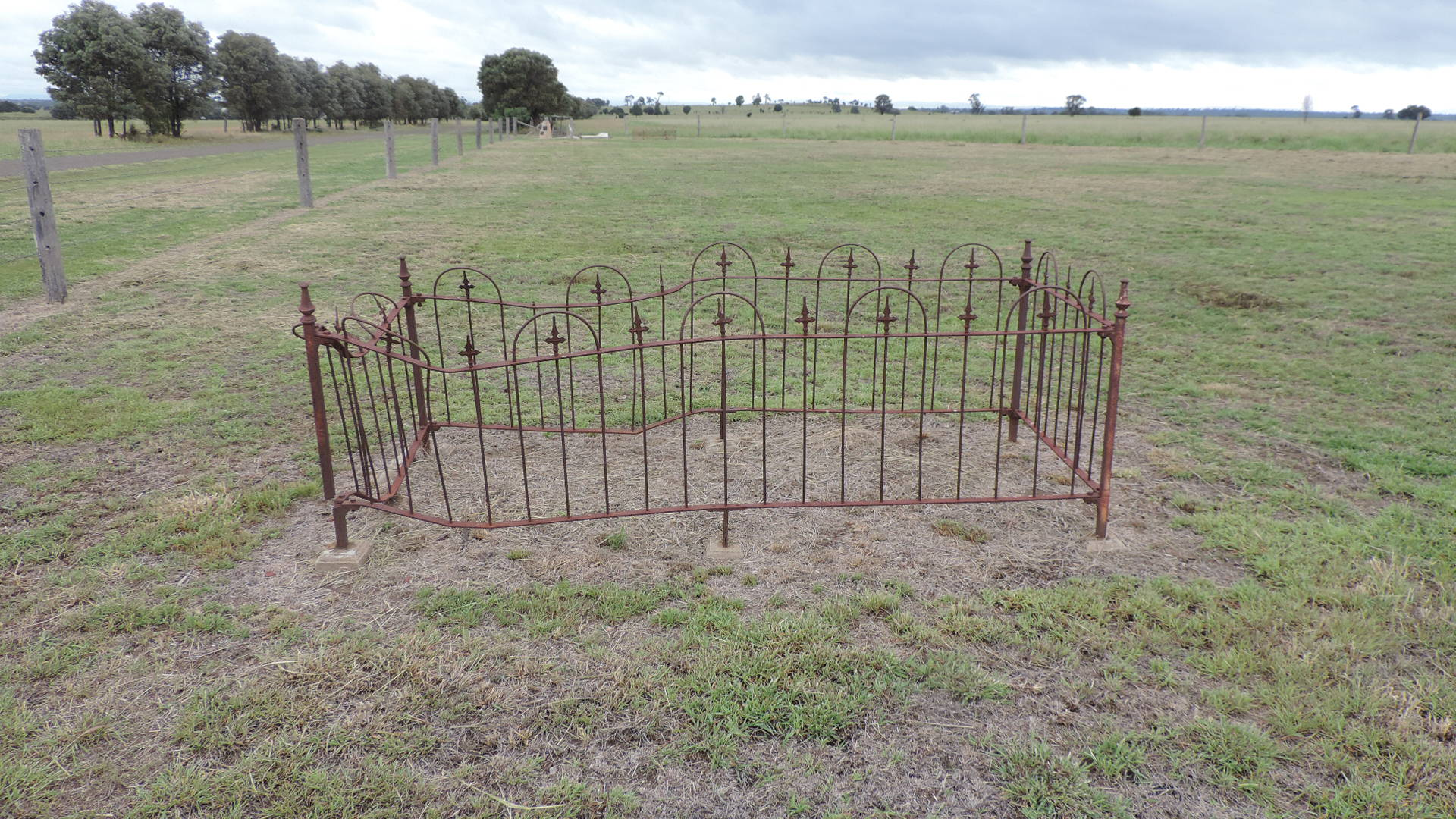
Old Theodore cemetery, 2014

Despite the name, Theodore Airport (IATA: TDR, ICAO: YTDR) is in southern Lonesome Creek at 13524 Eidsvold Theodore Road (24.9894°S 150.0949°E). No regular scheduled services operate from it. The community has raised funds to install solar-powered lighting so the runway can be used for medical emergency flights at night.

There are two cemeteries in Lonesome Creek:

- Theodore Pioneer Cemetery at 600 Goolara Heinickes Road (24.9433°S 150.1258°E)
- Theodore Cemetery at 241 Woolthorpe Road (24.9602°S 150.1001°E)

== Amenities ==
Despite the name, Theodore Golf Course is at 271 Woolthorpe Road (24.9596°S 150.1024°E).
