= Spring Creek, Queensland =

Spring Creek, Queensland may refer to:

- Spring Creek, Queensland (Banana Shire), a locality in the Shire of Banana
- Spring Creek, Queensland (Darling Downs), a locality split between the Toowoomba Region and Southern Downs Region
- Spring Creek, Queensland (Lockyer Valley Region), a locality in the Lockyer Valley Region
