= Kianga, Queensland =

Kianga
- Suburb
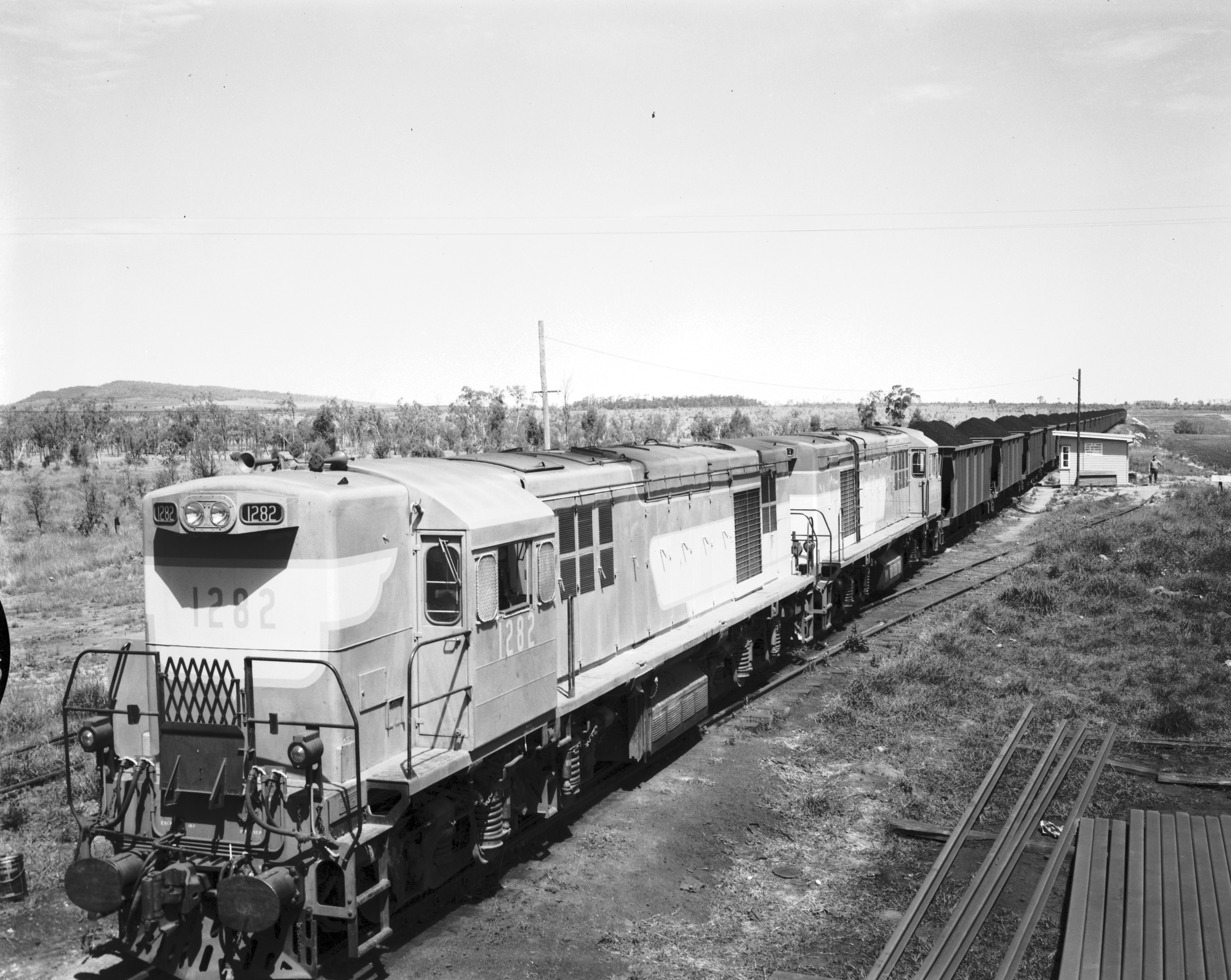
- Coal train, Moura mine, circa 1966

- Interactive map of Kianga
- Coordinates: 24.6902°S 150.0263°E
- Country: Australia
- State: Queensland
- LGA: Shire of Banana
- Location: 11.3 km (7.0 mi) S of Moura; 76.7 km (47.7 mi) WSW of Biloela; 197 km (122 mi) SW of Gladstone; 590 km (370 mi) NW of Brisbane

Government
  - State electorate: Callide
  - Federal division: Flynn

Area
  - Total: 414.7 km^{2} (160.1 sq mi)
- Elevation: 100–280 m (330–920 ft)

Population
  - Total: 219 (2021 census)
  - Density: 0.5281/km^{2} (1.368/sq mi)
- Time zone: UTC+10:00 (AEST)
- Postcode: 4718
Suburbs around Kianga
Moura	Moura	Banana
Warnoah	Kianga	Banana
Warnoah	Glenmoral	Lonesome Creek

Kianga is a rural locality in the Shire of Banana, Queensland, Australia. In the 2021 census, Kianga had a population of 219 people.

== Geography ==
The land use is a mixture of mining, grazing on native vegetation, and crop growing.

There are a number of railway stations within the locality:

- on the Moura railway line (from west to east):
  - Moura West railway station (24.5495°S 150.0039°E)
  - Moura Mine railway station (24.5267°S 150.0665°E)
- on the closed Dawson Valley railway line with all stations now abandoned (from north to south):
  - Gibihi railway station (24.6153°S 149.9977°E)
  - Kianga railway station (24.6949°S 150.0124°E)
  - Nipan railway station (24.7742°S 150.0217°E)
  - Willawa railway station (24.8324°S 150.0337°E)
  - Kaloola railway station (24.8487°S 150.0624°E)

== History ==
The locality takes its name from the former railway station, named on 23 December 1937 by Queensland Railways Department after a pastoral run. It is an Aboriginal word, meaning home.

On 20 September 1975, there was an explosion in Kianga No. 1 underground coal mine resulting in the deaths of 13 miners. On 11 March 1978, a memorial centre in Moura (the nearest town) was officially opened to commemorate the disaster.

== Demographics ==
In the 2016 census, Kianga had a population of 227 people.

In the 2021 census, Kianga had a population of 219 people.

== Education ==
There are no schools in Kianga. The nearest government primary schools are Moura State School in neighbouring Moura to the north-west, Banana State School in neighbouring Banana to the north-east, and Theodore State School in Theodore to the south. The nearest government secondary schools are Moura State High School (to Year 12) in Moura and Theodore State School (to Year 10) in Theodore.
