= Alberta, Queensland =

Alberta
- Suburb
- Interactive map of Alberta
- Coordinates: 24.2616°S 149.7655°E
- Country: Australia
- State: Queensland
- LGA: Shire of Banana
- Location: 115 km (71 mi) WNW of Biloela; 157 km (98 mi) SW of Rockhampton; 670 km (420 mi) NW of Brisbane

Government
  - State electorate: Callide
  - Federal division: Flynn

Area
  - Total: 385.4 km^{2} (148.8 sq mi)

Population
  - Total: 36 (2021 census)
  - Density: 0.0934/km^{2} (0.242/sq mi)
- Time zone: UTC+10:00 (AEST)
- Postcode: 4702
Suburbs around Alberta
Mimosa	Barnard	Kokotungo
Mimosa	Alberta	Baralaba
Roundstone	Warnoah	Moura

Alberta is a rural locality in the Shire of Banana, Queensland, Australia. In the 2021 census, Alberta had a population of 36 people.

== Geography ==
Part of the Dawson Range State Forest is in the north-west of the locality, used for commercial forestry. Apart from that, the land use is predominantly grazing on native vegetation with some crop growing in the south of the locality.

There are a number of homesteads in the locality, including:

- Blue Hills (24.3021°S 149.7984°E)
- Rosedale (24.3675°S 149.7852°E)

== Demographics ==
In the 2016 census, Alberta had a population of 69 people.

In the 2021 census, Alberta had a population of 36 people.

== Education ==
There are no schools in Alberta. The nearest government primary schools are Baralaba State School in neighbouring Baralaba to the east and Moura State School in neighbouring Moura to the south-east. The nearest government secondary schools are Baralaba State School (to Year 10) and Moura State High School (to Year 12) in neighbouring Moura to the south-east.
