= Coorada, Queensland =

Coorada
- Suburb
- Interactive map of Coorada
- Coordinates: 24.9716°S 149.5461°E
- Country: Australia
- State: Queensland
- LGA: Shire of Banana
- Location: 66.6 km (41.4 mi) SSE of Bauhinia; 169 km (105 mi) WSW of Biloela; 288 km (179 mi) SW of Rockhampton; 290 km (180 mi) WSW of Gladstone; 550 km (340 mi) NW of Brisbane

Government
  - State electorate: Callide
  - Federal division: Flynn

Area
  - Total: 643.8 km^{2} (248.6 sq mi)

Population
  - Total: 0 (2021 census)
  - Density: 0.0000/km^{2} (0.0000/sq mi)
- Time zone: UTC+10:00 (AEST)
- Postcode: 4420
Suburbs around Coorada
Mungabunda	Rhydding	Roundstone
Mungabunda	Coorada	Glenmoral
Glenhaughton	Gwambegwine	Ghinghinda

Coorada is a rural locality in the Shire of Banana, Queensland, Australia. In the 2021 census, Coorada had "no people or a very low population".

== Geography ==
The Taroom Bauhinia Downs Road (State Route 7) runs through from south to north.

There are a number of sections of the Theodore State Forest within the locality and extending into neighbouring localities. Apart from these protected areas, the land use is grazing on native vegetation.

== Demographics ==
In the 2016 census, Coorada had "no people or a very low population".

In the 2021 census, Coorada had "no people or a very low population".

== Education ==
There are no schools in Coorada. The nearest government primary schools is Bauhinia State School in Bauhinia to the north-west, but students in the southern part of the locality would be too distant to attend this school. Also, there are no nearby secondary schools. The alternatives are distance education and boarding school.
