= Shire of Banana =

Coordinates: 24°23′52″S 150°30′40″E

- Local government area
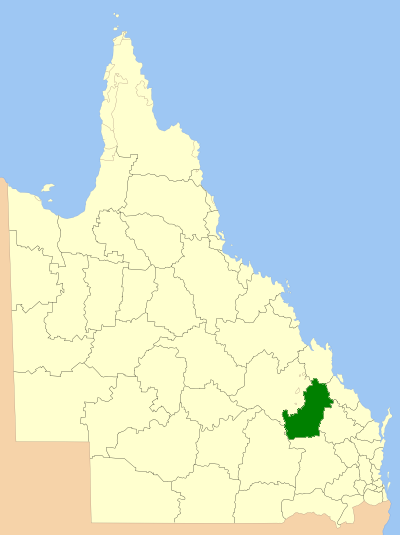
- Location within Queensland

- Interactive map of Shire of Banana
- Country: Australia
- State: Queensland
- Region: Central Queensland
- Established: 1879
- Council seat: Biloela

Government
  - Mayor: Neville Ferrier
  - State electorate: Callide
  - Federal division: Flynn

Area
  - Total: 28,610 km^{2} (11,050 sq mi)

Population
  - Total: 14,513 (2021 census)
  - Density: 0.50727/km^{2} (1.31382/sq mi)
- Website: Shire of Banana
LGAs around Shire of Banana
Rockhampton	Rockhampton	Gladstone
Central Highlands	Shire of Banana	North Burnett
Maranoa	Western Downs	North Burnett

The Shire of Banana is a local government area located in the Capricorn region of Queensland, Australia, inland from the regional city of Gladstone. The shire was named after the first township in the region (Banana), which in turn was named after the burial site of a huge dun coloured bullock named 'Banana'. The council sits in the town of Biloela, which is the largest town in the Shire.

Major industries in the shire include coal mining, beef production, power generation, dryland cropping and irrigation cropping such as lucerne and cotton.

In the 2021 census, the Shire of Banana had a population of 14,513 people.

== History ==
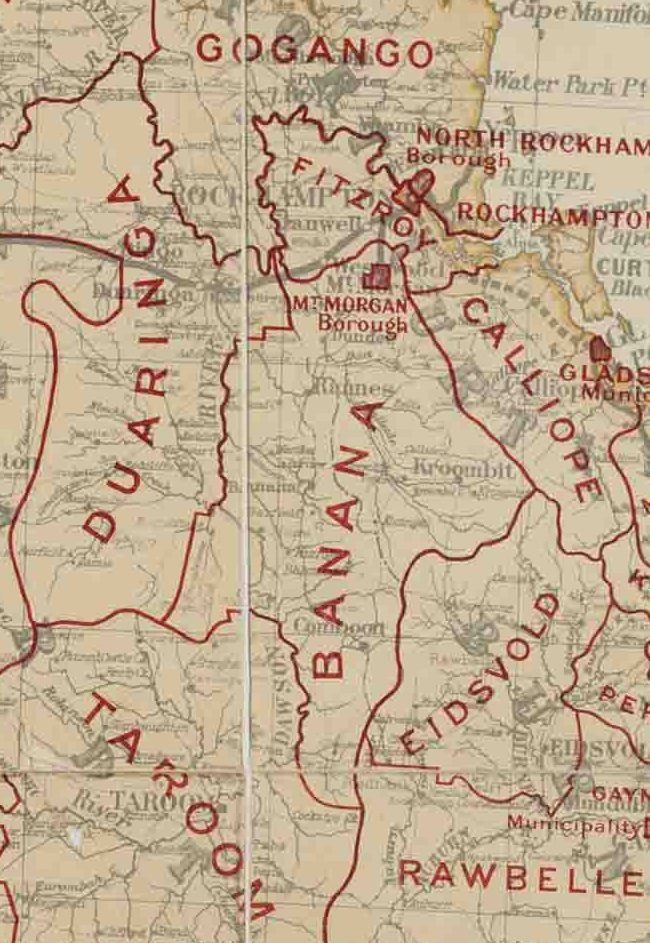
Map of Banana Division and adjacent local government areas, March 1902

Banana Division was created on 11 November 1879 as one of 74 divisions around Queensland under the Divisional Boards Act 1879 with a population of 2,155. The name Banana does not relate to the fruit, but rather the area was named after a dun-coloured bullock called Banana.

On 20 April 1881 part of Banana Division was separated to create Duaringa Division.

With the passage of the Local Authorities Act 1902, Banana Division became Shire on Banana on 31 March 1903.

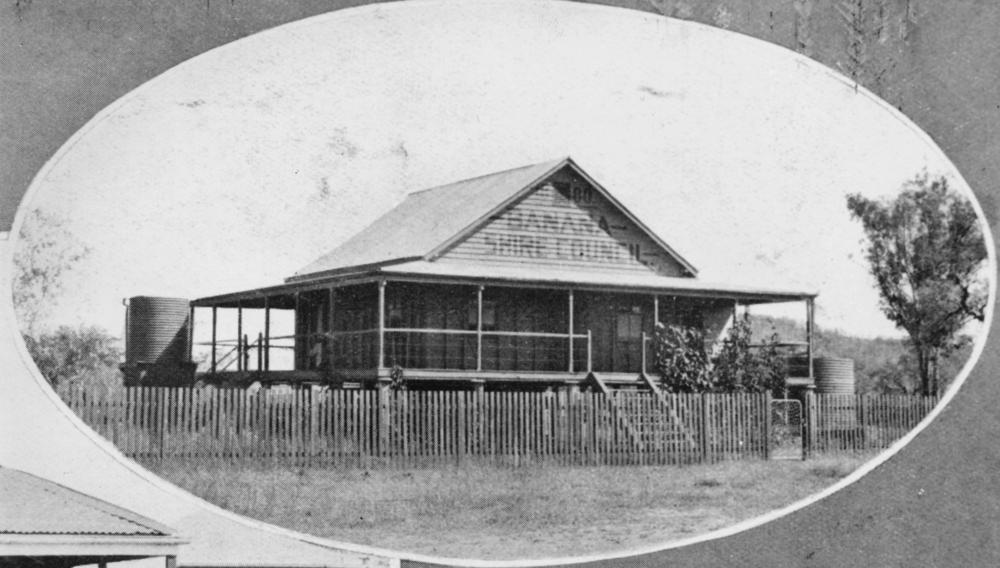
Shire Council building, Rannes, circa 1930

The shire's administrative centre was in Banana until 1930, when the building was physically relocated to Rannes. In 1946, the shire headquarters moved to Biloela.

On 15 March 2008, under the Local Government (Reform Implementation) Act 2007 passed by the Parliament of Queensland on 10 August 2007, the Shire of Banana absorbed the northern part of the neighbouring Shire of Taroom, including the town of Taroom itself, while the southern part was amalgamated into the Dalby Region (later renamed to the Western Downs Region).

== Demographics ==
In the 2016 census, the Shire of Banana had a population of 14,319 people.

In the 2021 census, the Shire of Banana had a population of 14,513 people.

== Offices ==
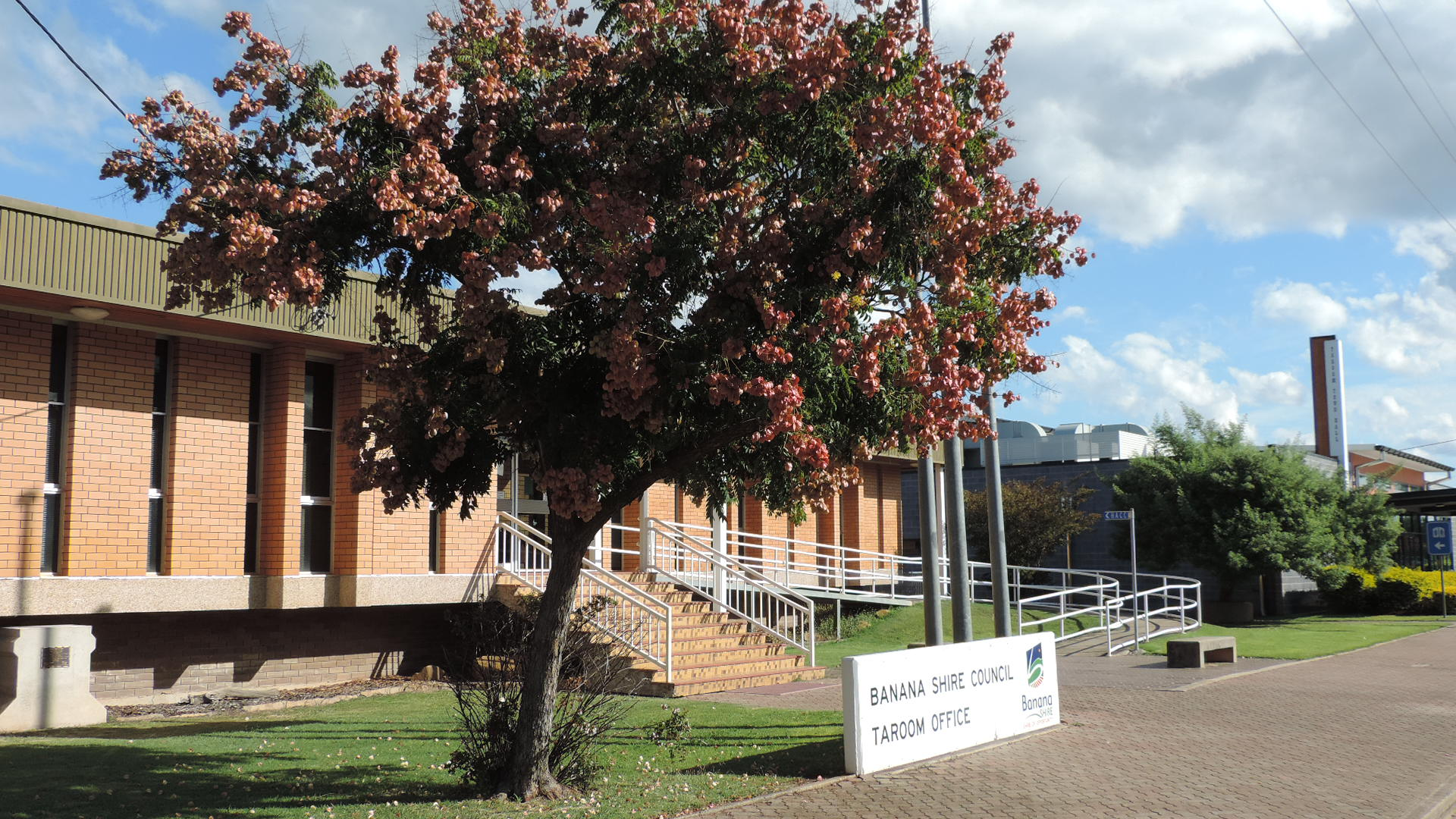
Banana Shire Council offices, Taroom, 2014

The council has three offices:

- Shire Chambers, 62 Valentine Plains Road, Biloela
- Administration Office, Gillespie Street, Moura
- Administration Office, Yaldwyn Street, Taroom

== Towns and localities ==
The Shire of Banana includes the following settlements:

Banana area:

- Alberta
- Banana
- Baralaba
- Baroondah
- Biloela
- Broadmere
- Callide
- Camboon
- Castle Creek
- Cockatoo
- Coorada
- Cracow
- Dakenba
- Deeford
- Dixalea
- Dululu
- Dumgree
- Dumpy Creek
- Eurombah^{1}
- Glebe
- Glenmoral
- Goovigen
- Hornet Bank
- Isla
- Jambin
- Kianga
- Kinnoul
- Kokotungo
- Lawgi Dawes
- Lonesome Creek
- Mount Murchison
- Moura
- Orange Creek
- Peek-a-doo
- Pheasant Creek
- Prospect
- Rannes
- Roundstone
- Spring Creek
- Tarramba
- Thangool
- Theodore
- Ulogie
- Valentine Plains
- Warnoah
- Westwood
- Woolein
- Wowan

North Taroom area:

- Ghinghinda
- Glenhaughton
- Gwambegwine
- Taroom

^{1} – shared with the Western Downs Region

== Services and resources ==
Banana Shire Council operate libraries at Biloela, Moura, Taroom, and Theodore. The council operates a fortnightly mobile library service to Banana and Banana School, Baralaba, Goovigen and Goovigen School, Jambin and Jambin School, Mount Murchison School and Prospect Creek School.

It has an abundance of natural resources, especially undeveloped coal deposits present in the Theodore, Moura and Baralaba area. Being a large supplier of methane gas, Banana Shire provides this huge resource for power generation and industrial use. Liquified natural gas pipelines are being developed presently in the region, which has also become the largest commodity producer in the Fitzroy Statistical Area.

== Chairs and mayors ==
The chairs of the division and shire have been:

- 1921–1924: Robert Staines
- 1924–1935: Horace Moncreith Roxburgh
- 1935–1949: John Christian Graham
- 1949–1955: George Llewellyn Robert Hamilton
- 1955–?: Alfred Whitney O'Rourke
- 1988–1994: Ronald Francis (Hec) Maynard OAM
- 2000–2008: Glenn Gordon Churchill
- 2008–2012: John Burnett Hooper
- 2012–2016: Ronald James Carige
- 2016–present : Neville George Ferrier

=== Robert Staines ===
Councillor Robert Staines

Chairman of Shire of Banana
- In office 1921–1924

Personal details
- Born: 25 June 1883 Teven, New South Wales
- Died: 8 January 1937 (aged 53) Goulburn, New South Wales
- Spouse: Daisy Emelie (née Gibb)
- Children: 2 daughters, 1 son
- Education: Newington College

Robert Staines was born on 25 June 1883 in Teven, New South Wales, the son of Sarah Jane (née Crawford) and Joseph Staines. He attended Alstonville Public School commencing in 1888 and Newington College commencing in 1901. Staines married Daisy Emelie Gibb on 24 May 1911 at the bride's family home at John Street Stanmore, New South Wales. The union produced two daughters and a son.

At the 1926 Queensland state election, he was the Country and Progressive National Party candidate for the Electoral district of Mount Morgan. Following that he was a candidate in the 1928, 1929 and 1931 federal elections unsuccessfully contesting the seat of Capricornia. In 1928 when Staines first ran for Capricornia against Frank Forde from the Labor Party, Country Party ministers in the Bruce conservative coalition government were said to be confident of his ability to win the seat. Whilst mentioning this in coverage of non-NSW seats The Sydney Morning Herald ultimately considered Forde to be the likely winner. At the time Forde was the only non-conservative Commonwealth Queensland member of the House of Representatives and so Staines campaign was closely monitored by the press.

He served as chairman of the Shire of Banana from 1921 to 1924. He was a member of the Rockhampton Harbour Board.

On 8 January 1937, Staines was killed in a motor vehicle accident near Goulburn, New South Wales. He was survived by his wife, two daughters, and a son.

At the time of Staines' death Frank Forde, deputy leader of the Federal Parliamentary Australian Labor Party and future prime minister of Australia, said of him: "although opposed to me politically, I learnt to respect him for his manly qualities and for his inherent sense of fair play. He did not at any time descend to personalities, nor did he take an unfair advantage of a political opponent. He gave able service in local authority affairs in Central Queensland for a number of years. His ability and enthusiasm merited further promotion in public life; and he would have been in the State Parliament as member for Fitzroy if he had accepted the invitation of his party to run for the seat in 1930."
