= Glenhaughton, Queensland =

Glenhaughton
- Suburb
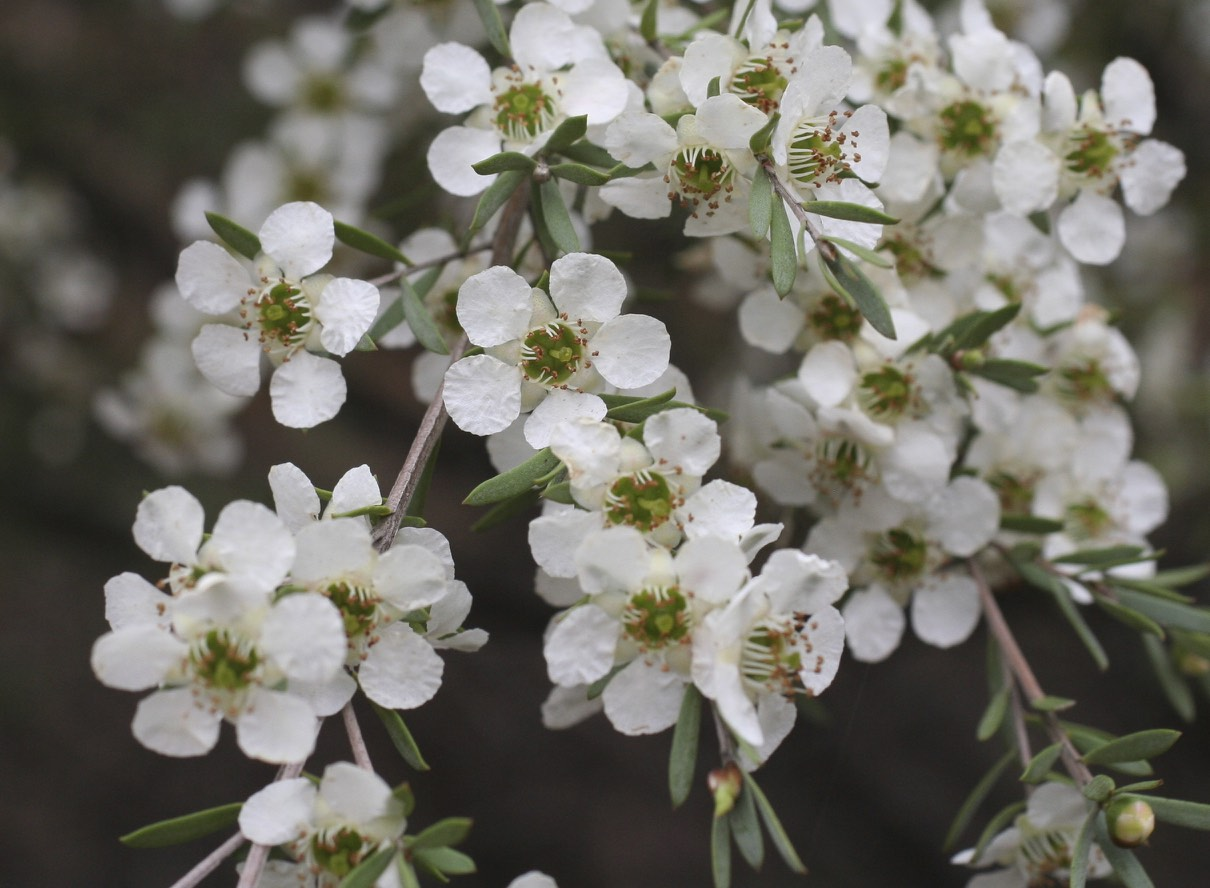
- Leptospermum sericatum in Glenaughton, 2012

- Interactive map of Glenhaughton
- Coordinates: 25.2441°S 149.1419°E
- Country: Australia
- State: Queensland
- LGA: Shire of Banana
- Location: 95.1 km (59.1 mi) NW of Taroom; 237 km (147 mi) SW of Biloela; 322 km (200 mi) SW of Rockhampton; 561 km (349 mi) NW of Brisbane

Government
  - State electorate: Callide
  - Federal division: Flynn

Area
  - Total: 2,891.3 km^{2} (1,116.3 sq mi)

Population
  - Total: 16 (2021 census)
  - Density: 0.00553/km^{2} (0.0143/sq mi)
- Time zone: UTC+10:00 (AEST)
- Postcode: 4420
Suburbs around Glenhaughton
Arcadia Valley	Mungabunda	Coorada
Arcadia Valley	Glenhaughton	Ghinghinda; Gwambegwine
Arcadia Valley	Baroondah	Broadmere

Glenhaughton is a rural locality in the Shire of Banana, Queensland, Australia. In the 2021 census, Glenhaughton had a population of 16 people.

== Geography ==
Most of the locality is within protected areas:

- Expedition National Park in the north-west and west of the locality, extending into neighbouring Arcadia Valley and Baroondah
- Presho State Forest in the north-east of the locality, extending into neighbouring Mungabunda
- Belington Hut State Forest in the south-east and south of the locality, extending into neighbouring Baroondah

Apart from these protected areas, the land use in the remainder of the locality is grazing on native vegetation.

Glenhaughton has the following mountains. valleys, and passes (from north to south):

- Ropers Peak (25.1168°S 149.0775°E) 704 metres (2,310 ft)
- Roper Pass (25.1893°S 149.0469°E)
- The Battery (25.1899°S 149.0383°E) 734 metres (2,408 ft)
- Cannondale Mountain (25.2128°S 148.9731°E) 768 metres (2,520 ft)
- Battleship (25.2235°S 148.8827°E) 649 metres (2,129 ft)
- Robinson Gorge (25.2807°S 149.1449°E)
- Bells Pass (25.3215°S 149.0863°E)
- Shepherds Peak (25.3219°S 149.2013°E) 510 metres (1,670 ft)
- Surprise Mountain (25.3469°S 149.1331°E) 598 metres (1,962 ft)
- Mount Pleasant (25.3668°S 149.2267°E) 417 metres (1,368 ft)
- Round Mount (25.3717°S 149.4093°E) 390 metres (1,280 ft)
- Mount Weldon (25.3745°S 149.0798°E) 660 metres (2,170 ft)

== History ==
Presho State Forest was gazetted on 28 June 1980 (25.1483°S 149.2677°E).

Expedition National Park was first gazetted in 1994. It has been subsequently expanded.

== Demographics ==
In the 2016 census, Glenhaughton had a population of 18 people.

In the 2021 census, Glenhaughton had a population of 16 people.

== Education ==
There are no schools in Glenhaughton. The nearest government primary schools are Bauhinia State School in Bauhinia to the north and Taroom State School in Taroom to the south-east. The nearest government secondary school is Taroom State School (to Year 10). However, most students in Glenhaughton would be too distant to attend these schools. Also, there are no nearby schools providing education to Year 12. The alternatives are distance education and boarding school.

== Attractions ==
Belington Hut State Forest has one of the largest colonies of flying foxes in Australia (with approximately 900,000 individuals).
