= Gwambegwine, Queensland =

Gwambegwine
- Suburb
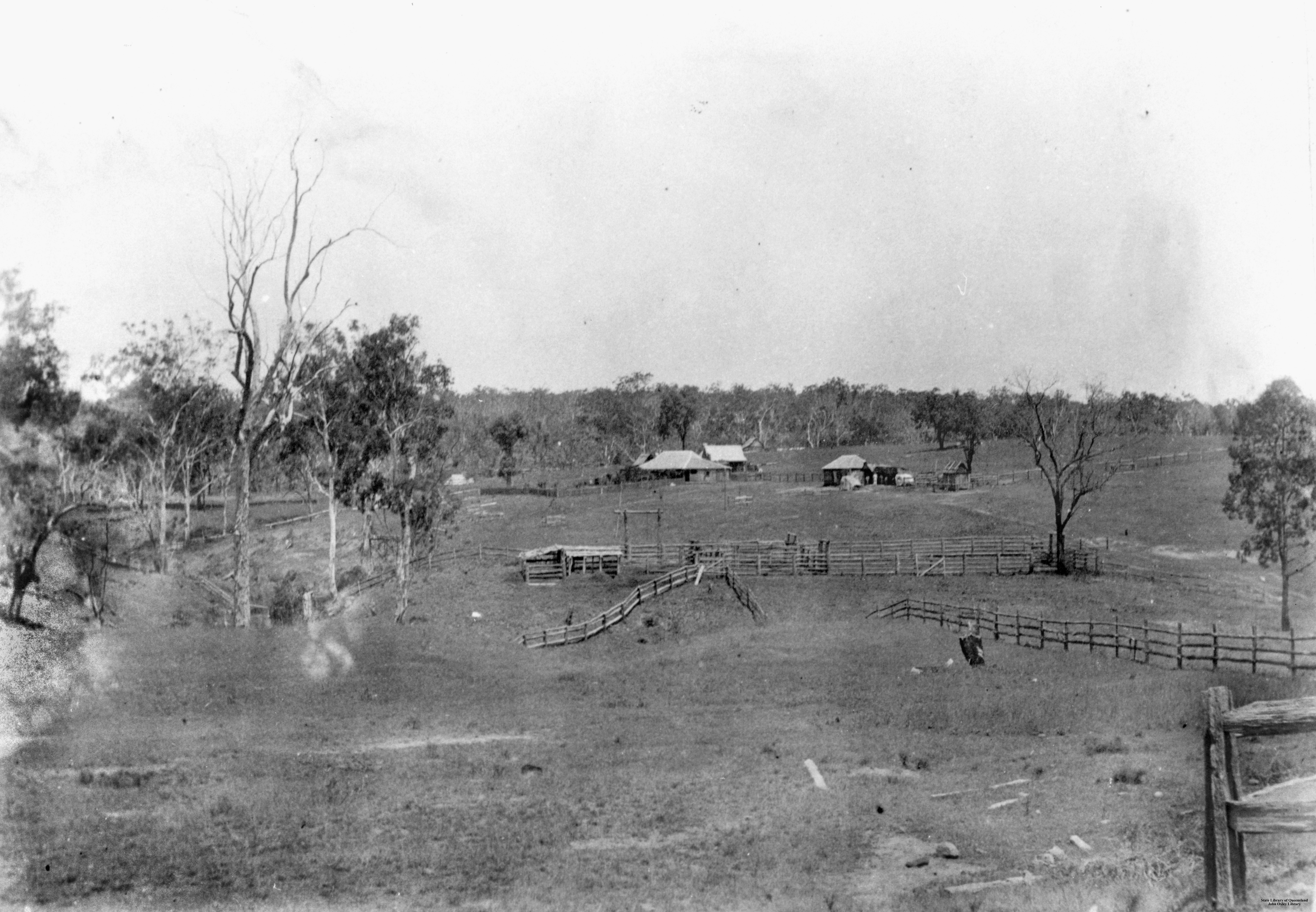
- Gwambegwine pastoral station, circa 1899

- Interactive map of Gwambegwine
- Coordinates: 25.3294°S 149.5738°E
- Country: Australia
- State: Queensland
- LGA: Shire of Banana
- Location: 29.5 km (18.3 mi) N of Taroom; 192 km (119 mi) SW of Biloela; 295 km (183 mi) SW of Rockhampton; 495 km (308 mi) NW of Brisbane

Government
  - State electorate: Callide
  - Federal division: Flynn

Area
  - Total: 830.3 km^{2} (320.6 sq mi)

Population
  - Total: 27 (2021 census)
  - Density: 0.0325/km^{2} (0.0842/sq mi)
- Time zone: UTC+10:00 (AEST)
- Postcode: 4420
Suburbs around Gwambegwine
Glenhaughton	Coorada	Ghinghinda
Glenhaughton	Gwambegwine	Ghinghinda
Glenhaughton	Broadmere	Taroom

Gwambegwine is a rural locality in the Shire of Banana, Queensland, Australia. In the 2021 census, Gwambegwine had a population of 27 people.

== Geography ==
Palm Tree Creek forms most of the eastern and south-eastern boundary of the locality; it becomes a tributary of the Dawson River in neighbouring Taroom. The Murphy Range forms most of the south-western and southern boundaries.

Gwambagwine Creek (note the variant spelling) rises in the west of the locality and flows in the easterly direction through the locality, becoming a tributary of Palm Tree Creek on the locality's eastern boundary.

The Fitzroy Developmental Road (locally known as the Taroom Bauhinia Downs Road) enters the locality from south-east (Taroom) and exits to the north-east (Ghinghinda).

There are two sections of the Gwambegwine State Forest (again with the variant spelling) in the south-west and south of the locality. Apart from these protected areas, the land use is grazing on native vegetation.

== History ==
The explorer Ludwig Leichhardt travelled through the area in 1844. He named the Murphy Range after John Murphy who was a member of the expedition. He named Palm Tree Creek due to presence of Corypha trees.

The parish name was Gwambagwine (note the same spelling as the creek), which in turn takes its name from an early pastoral run. Both the parish name and creek name are believed to be a corruption of the Aboriginal name guambeguine, meaning a waterhole in the bend of the stream.

== Demographics ==
In the 2016 census, Gwambegwine had a population of 20 people.

In the 2021 census, Gwambegwine had a population of 27 people.

== Education ==
There are no schools in Gwambegwine. The nearest government school is Taroom State School (Prep to Year 10) in neighbouring Taroom to the south-west. However, parts of Gwambegwine are too distant to attend this school. Also, there is no secondary schooling to Year 12 available nearby. The alternatives are distance education and boarding school.
