= Theodore, Queensland =

Theodore
- Town
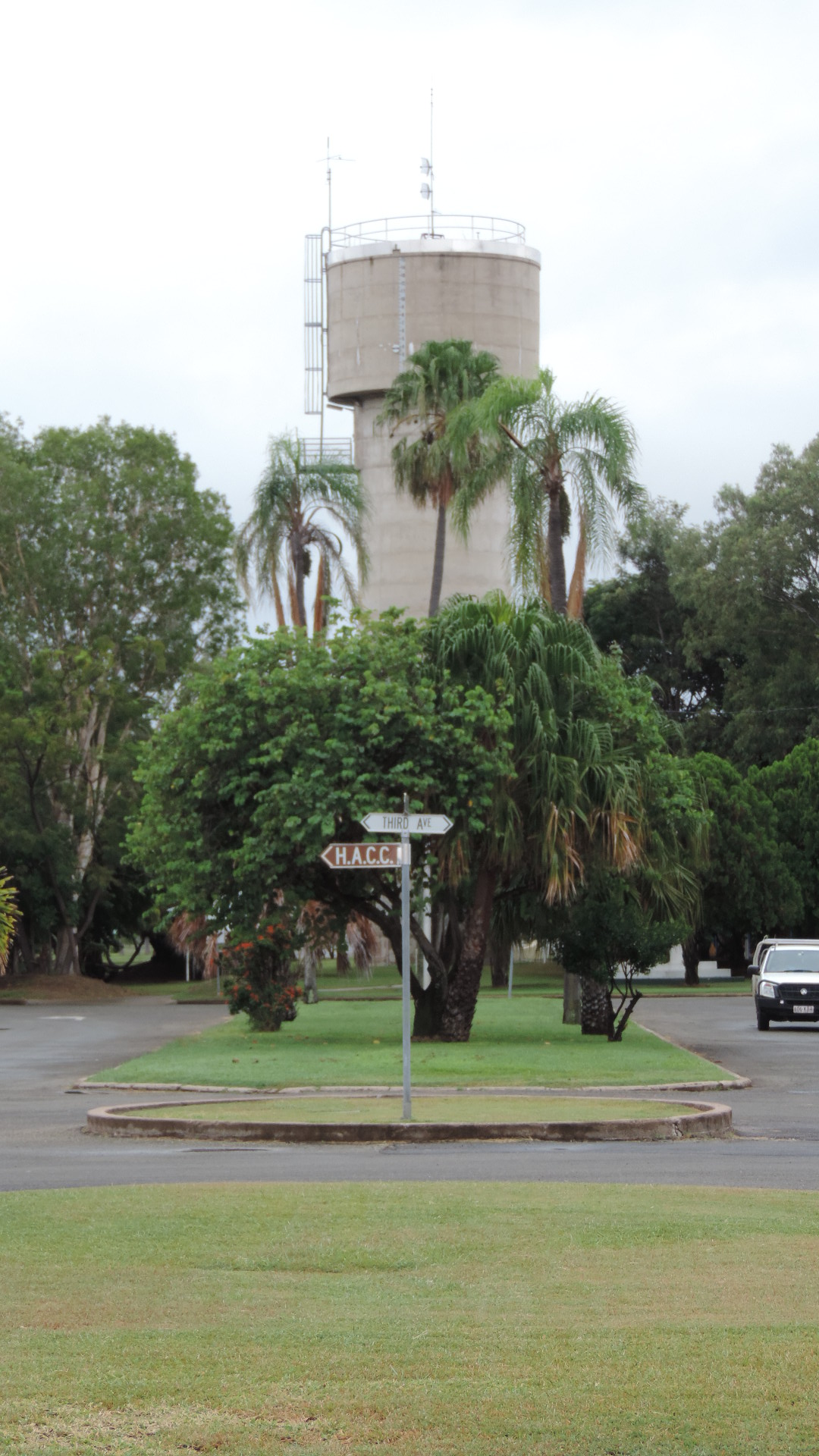
- The Boulevard, looking towards the water tower

- Interactive map of Theodore
- Coordinates: 24.9472°S 150.0755°E
- Country: Australia
- State: Queensland
- LGA: Shire of Banana
- Location: 106 km (66 mi) SW of Biloela; 208 km (129 mi) SSE of Rockhampton; 552 km (343 mi) NW of Brisbane

Government
  - State electorate: Callide
  - Federal division: Flynn

Area
  - Total: 2.2 km^{2} (0.85 sq mi)
- Elevation: 175 m (574 ft)

Population
  - Total: 451 (2021 census)
  - Density: 205/km^{2} (531/sq mi)
- Time zone: UTC+10:00 (AEST)
- Postcode: 4719
- Mean max temp: 28.4 °C (83.1 °F)
- Mean min temp: 13.9 °C (57.0 °F)
- Annual rainfall: 732.2 mm (28.83 in)
Localities around Theodore
Lonesome Creek	Lonesome Creek	Lonesome Creek
Isla	Theodore	Lonesome Creek
Isla	Isla	Lonesome Creek

Theodore is a rural town and locality in the Shire of Banana, Queensland, Australia. It was established in the 1920s as part of Queensland Premier Ted Theodore's ambitious Dawson River Irrigation Scheme which failed to materialize. It was originally known as Castle Creek, but that name is now used by another locality in the area.

In the 2021 census, the locality of Theodore had a population of 451 people.

== Geography ==
Theodore is situated on the Dawson River just off the Leichhardt Highway 565 kilometres (351 mi) north-west of the state capital, Brisbane. Castle Creek flows through the town and into the Dawson River immediately south of the town centre.

=== Climate ===
Theodore has a humid subtropical climates (Köppen: Cfa), with hot, wet summers and mild, dry winters with cool nights. Average maxima vary from 33.5 °C (92.3 °F) in December to 21.6 °C (70.9 °F) in July while average minima fluctuate between 20.4 °C (68.7 °F) in January and February and 6.2 °C (43.2 °F) in July. Mean average annual precipitation is moderate: 732.2 mm (28.83 in), but is highly concentrated during the summer. Rainfall is spread across 53.1 precipitation days (above the 1.0 mm (0.039 in) threshold), and the town experiences 86.7 clear days and 44.8 cloudy days per annum. Extreme temperatures have ranged from 42.0 °C (107.6 °F) on 28 January 1990 to −4.4 °C (24.1 °F) on 6 July 1982. Sunshine data was sourced from Brigalow Research Station, which is 30.1 km (18.7 mi) northwest of Theodore.

Climate data for Theodore (24º57'00"S, 150º04'12"E, 142 m AMSL) (1903-1994 normals, extremes 1965-1990)
Month	Jan	Feb	Mar	Apr	May	Jun	Jul	Aug	Sep	Oct	Nov	Dec	Year
Record high °C (°F)	42.0 (107.6)	41.1 (106.0)	39.0 (102.2)	36.9 (98.4)	32.2 (90.0)	27.5 (81.5)	27.5 (81.5)	31.8 (89.2)	34.5 (94.1)	38.9 (102.0)	40.6 (105.1)	41.0 (105.8)	42.0 (107.6)
Mean daily maximum °C (°F)	33.4 (92.1)	32.6 (90.7)	31.3 (88.3)	29.1 (84.4)	25.0 (77.0)	22.0 (71.6)	21.6 (70.9)	23.4 (74.1)	26.6 (79.9)	30.0 (86.0)	32.1 (89.8)	33.5 (92.3)	28.4 (83.1)
Mean daily minimum °C (°F)	20.4 (68.7)	20.4 (68.7)	18.8 (65.8)	14.9 (58.8)	10.8 (51.4)	7.1 (44.8)	6.2 (43.2)	7.0 (44.6)	10.2 (50.4)	14.4 (57.9)	17.3 (63.1)	19.3 (66.7)	13.9 (57.0)
Record low °C (°F)	15.0 (59.0)	15.0 (59.0)	10.0 (50.0)	5.6 (42.1)	1.9 (35.4)	−2.8 (27.0)	−4.4 (24.1)	−1.5 (29.3)	2.0 (35.6)	4.5 (40.1)	8.0 (46.4)	11.5 (52.7)	−4.4 (24.1)
Average precipitation mm (inches)	103.1 (4.06)	105.6 (4.16)	63.0 (2.48)	48.0 (1.89)	42.3 (1.67)	33.2 (1.31)	37.9 (1.49)	26.5 (1.04)	26.3 (1.04)	61.4 (2.42)	84.7 (3.33)	100.6 (3.96)	732.2 (28.83)
Average precipitation days (≥ 1.0 mm)	6.6	6.3	4.7	3.3	3.0	3.0	3.2	2.7	2.8	4.8	6.0	6.7	53.1
Average afternoon relative humidity (%)	41	46	46	44	47	43	45	40	35	36	38	39	42
Average dew point °C (°F)	16.4 (61.5)	16.7 (62.1)	15.7 (60.3)	12.6 (54.7)	10.6 (51.1)	6.8 (44.2)	6.2 (43.2)	6.2 (43.2)	7.6 (45.7)	9.7 (49.5)	13.1 (55.6)	15.5 (59.9)	11.4 (52.6)
Mean monthly sunshine hours	226.3	197.8	223.2	213.0	195.3	195.0	210.8	229.4	246.0	254.2	249.0	254.2	2,694.2
Percentage possible sunshine	54	54	59	62	58	61	63	66	69	65	62	60	61
Source: Bureau of Meteorology (1903-1994 normals, extremes 1965-1990)

== History ==
The Aboriginal inhabitants of the area were the Gangulu people. Gangalu (Gangulu, Kangulu, Kanolu, Kaangooloo, Khangulu) is an Australian Aboriginal language spoken on Gangula country. The Gangula language region includes the towns of Clermont and Springsure extending south towards the Dawson River.

The first European settler in the district was Joseph Thompson who amassed a number of pastoral leases from 1850 to his death in 1857, including Oxtrack Creek, Okangal, Coteeda, Delusion Creek, Macoom, Hope, Thalba and Woolthorpe. He entered a partnership with James Reid who acquired the Boam run and acquired Thompson's runs after his death and then acquired further runs, before beginning to sell out to new settlers.

In 1864 a town called Woolthorpe was surveyed and town lots offered for sale, but few were sold and no town developed at that time.

In 1893, William Woolrych acquired 13,000 acres (53 km^{2}) of land alongside the Dawson River and gradually built it up through further land acquisitions into the very large Woolthorpe Station.

=== Dawson River Irrigation Scheme ===
In 1905, the Queensland Minister for Lands Joshua Thomas Bell and fellow Member of the Queensland Legislative Assembly Robert Herbertson conducted a tour of the district. Herbertson reported that Woolthorpe was "a splendid property, consisting of downs and black soil flats" used for sheep grazing. Herbertson also reported favourably on an experiment to raise lucerne by irrigating 70–80 acres (28–32 ha) of cleared land beside the Dawson River. His opinion was that there was plenty of water available in the Dawson River for irrigation and the land could grow almost any crop. Herbertson believed that, with irrigation, the district would be capable of supporting a large population, provided there was cheap, easy and quick transport to the coast. This comment about transport followed Minister Bell's earlier criticism of the condition of the roads west of Gladstone which were the responsibility of the Banana Shire and the Taroom Shire.

The idea of a major irrigation scheme involving the Dawson River continued to be considered by the Queensland Parliament over a number of years. However, it was not until February 1920, that the Premier of Queensland Ted Theodore announced his support for a Dawson River irrigation scheme. Later that year, in September 1920, Ted Theodore announced that a dam would be built at The Gorge on the Dawson River (25.44645°S 150.14909°E) enabling 100,000 acres (40,000 ha) of fertile land to be created through irrigation along 65 kilometres (40 mi) of the Dawson River. The irrigated area would be organised into five zones: Isla, Castle Creek (later Theodore), Huon, Moura and Coolibah, with each zone having a central township. There would be irrigated farms closer to the river and dry (non-irrigated) blocks further away. It was estimated that there would be about 5000 farms and that, together with those living in the towns providing services to the farmers, the irrigation scheme would support about 50,000 people. Each town would be a "model garden city" as the local population would be sufficient to enable all modern amenities and recreational facilities; this was seen as important to attract younger people, who were believed to be abandoning rural towns in favour of cities to which many had been exposed during the Great War.

In 1922, it was announced that the gorge and the dam would both be named after Matthew Nathan, the (then) Governor of Queensland. The dam would be the second largest in the world, submerging over 83,200 acres (337 km^{2}) and capable of storing 2,485,000 acre feet (3.065 cubic kilometres) of water. (For comparison, the present day Wivenhoe Dam has an area of 109.4 square kilometres and a capacity of 2.61 cubic kilometres).

Also in 1922, it was announced that, in addition to the dam, the Dawson Valley Irrigation scheme would include the construction of a railway line to service the Dawson Valley. The funding for the overall scheme was to be through a loan from America for approximately £2.5 million.

=== Creating the town of Theodore ===
As it would take some time to build the Nathan Dam, it was decided to commence on a smaller scale by initiating the Castle Creek irrigation zone by building a small low-cost weir nearby on the Dawson River, from which water would be pumped along canals to the irrigated farms. A power station was also built beside the river. The land offered for initial settlement was 264 irrigated farms of average size 13 acres (5.3 ha) and 109 dry blocks of average size 211 acres (85 ha).

The town was initially called Castle Creek after the local railway station, which in turn took its name from the creek which flowed into the Dawson River just south of the town. However, in November 1926, it was renamed in honour of Ted Theodore, who as Premier of Queensland had given so much support to the irrigation scheme.

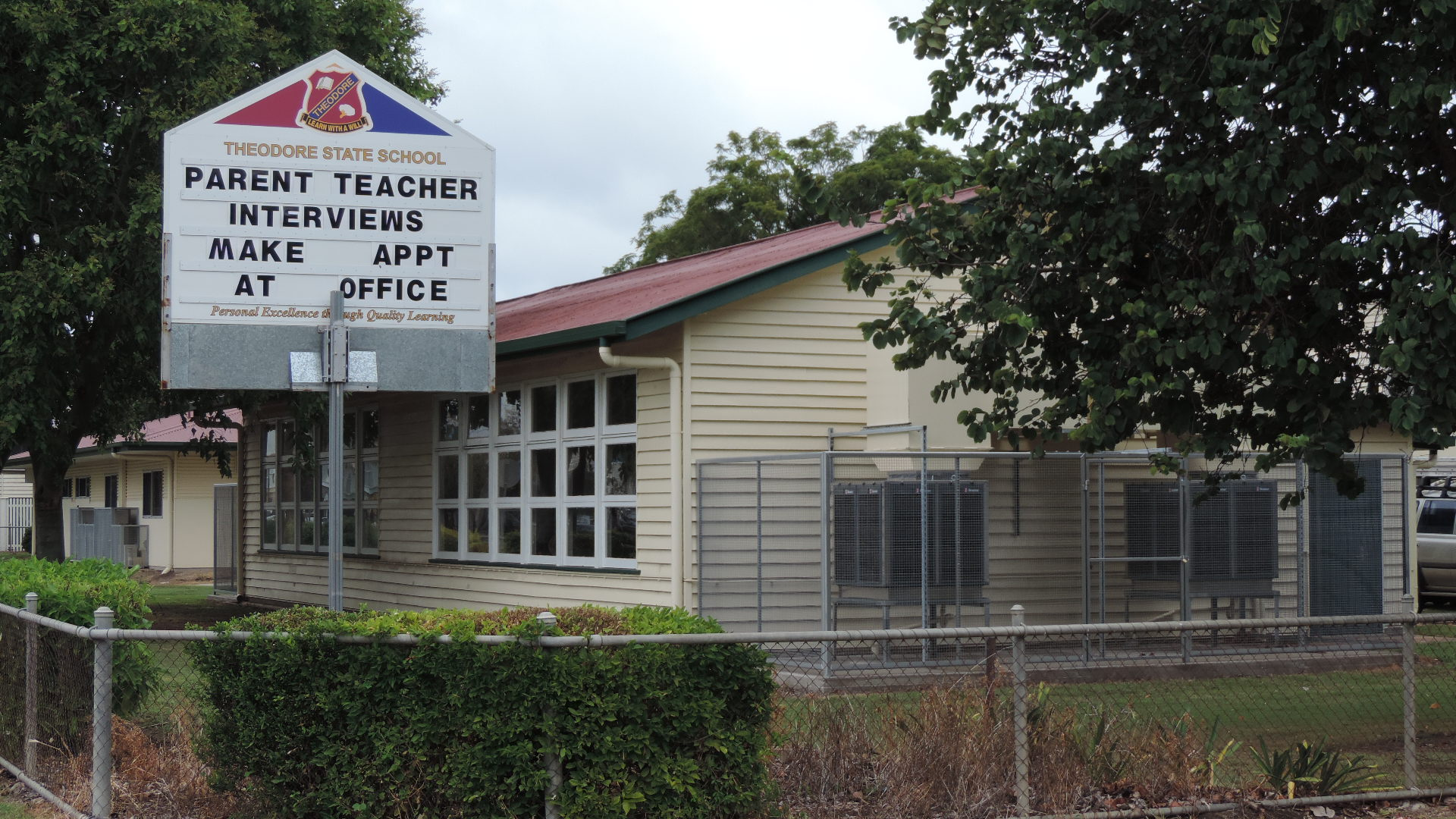
Theodore State School, 2014

Theodore State School opened on 6 May 1924.

The Castle Creek receiving office opened on 1 December 1924, but was upgraded to a post office on 15 December 1924. It was renamed Theodore Post Office on 1 July 1927.

The Hotel Theodore was originally built as a boarding house to accommodate new residents to the district.

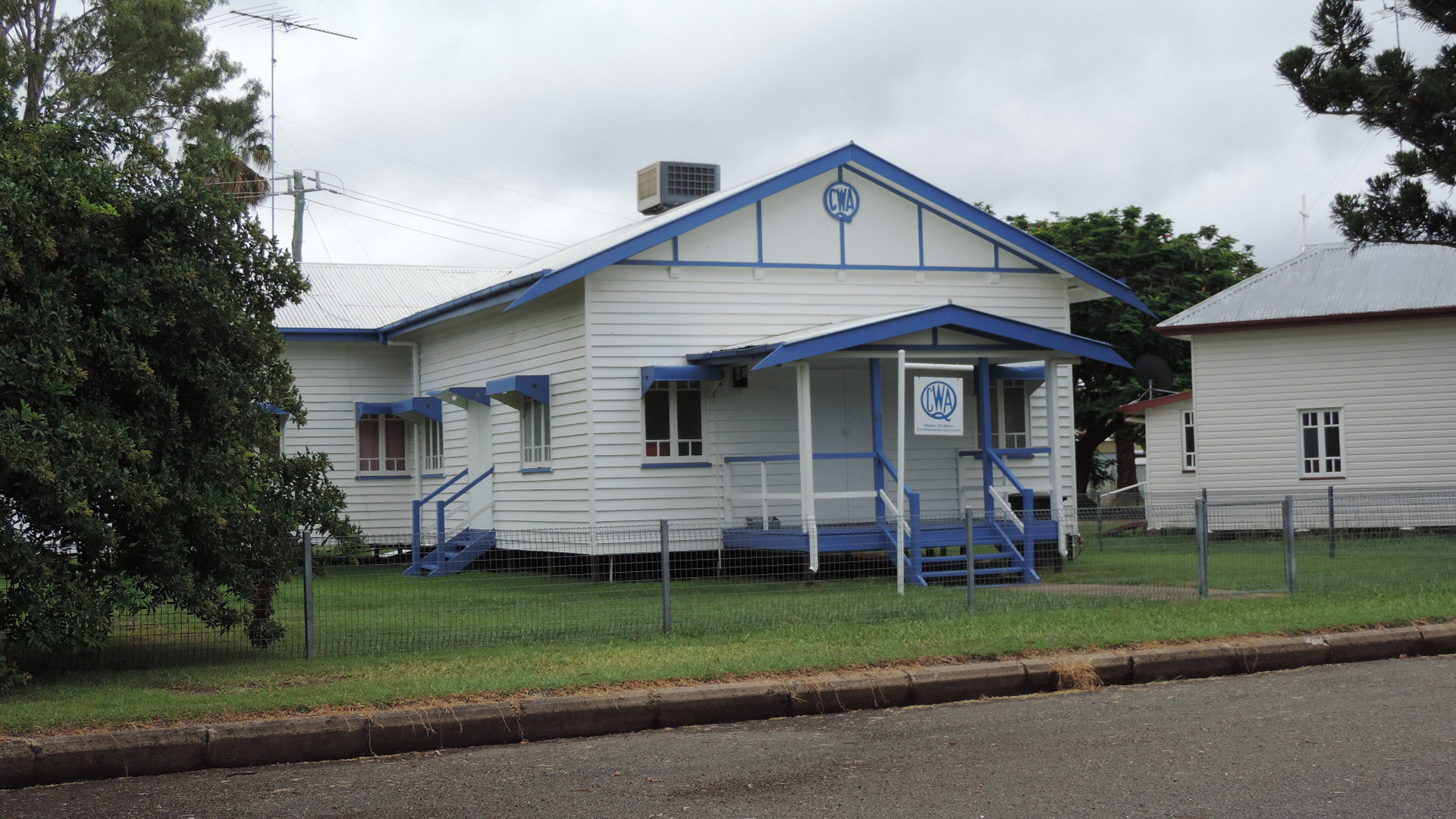
Country Women's Association hall, 2014

The Theodore branch of the Country Women's Association was established in about 1928. In 1932, they opened their original rest rooms in Theodore in 1923 at a cost of £113. On 21 February 1953, their current hall on The Boulevard was opened. The land was donated and the building cost £3,000. It is painted in the traditional blue-and-white colours of the CWA.

The Theodore Public Library was opened in 1959.

=== Postponement of Nathan Dam ===
However, Ted Theodore never obtained funding for the Nathan Dam and in 1925 he resigned as Queensland Premier in order to move into federal parliament. In 1933, the Nathan Dam was postponed for 25 years. Without the water needed for irrigation, many of the small farm blocks around Theodore became economically unviable and many sold at a loss. This enabled others to enlarge their holdings to a size where it became possible to support a family with dry farming. However, with fewer families, the population estimates used for Theodore's planning could not be achieved in practice, making many aspects of the town's existing and planned infrastructure economically unviable to the disappointment of the settlers attracted by the government's promotional material of a model garden city.

In 2006, the Queensland Government announced that the Nathan Dam was the preferred short-to-medium-term water supply solution for the district to meet the needs of the growing mining activity in the Surat Basin but indicated that only existing agricultural users would be supplied, suggesting there is no plan to revive the Dawson River Irrigation Scheme more generally. The dam was originally intended to be operational by 2014. In 2009, environmental impact studies discovered that half of the already endangered Boggomoss snail (Adclarkia dawsonensis) population would be within the inundation area of the dam. A mitigation strategy would be to relocate those snail communities to other suitable habitats outside the inundation area. A trial relocation project was established but required three years to complete as the success criteria require that relocated snail communities successful breed and rear young for two generations. This trial would delay the project by at least two years. Later in 2009, SunWater claimed other studies of the snails discovered 18,000 snails in other unidentified locations, reducing the concern about the population in the inundation area and allowing the dam project to resume. However, as at August 2015, the Queensland Government still lists the snail as "endangered in Queensland" with only two population groups. Although the Environmental Impact Statement for the dam was completed in 2012, changes to the proposed route of the pipeline in 2013 meant the environmental impact statement had to be revised. As at November 2015, the revised EIS had not been released for public comment.

=== Flooding ===
In March 2010 the Dawson River flooded, causing significant economic damage to the town. On 28 December 2010, a second flood forced evacuation of the town, with the level of the Dawson River exceeding 14.6 metres.

== Demographics ==
In the 2011 census, the locality of Theodore had a population of 452 people.

In the 2016 census, the locality of Theodore had a population of 438 people.

In the 2021 census, the locality of Theodore had a population of 451 people.

== Economy ==
The town's economy is closely linked to coal mining – Theodore is at the southern end of Queensland's coal-rich Bowen Basin.

== Education ==
Theodore State School is a government primary and secondary (Prep-10) school for boys and girls at The Boulevard (24.9460°S 150.0750°E). The school motto is "Learn with a will". In 2015, Theodore State School had 120 students enrolled. In 2018, the school had an enrolment of 108 students with 14 teachers (13 full-time equivalent) and 15 non-teaching staff (8 full-time equivalent).

For schooling to Year 12, the nearest government school is Moura State High School in Moura to the north-west.

== Transport ==
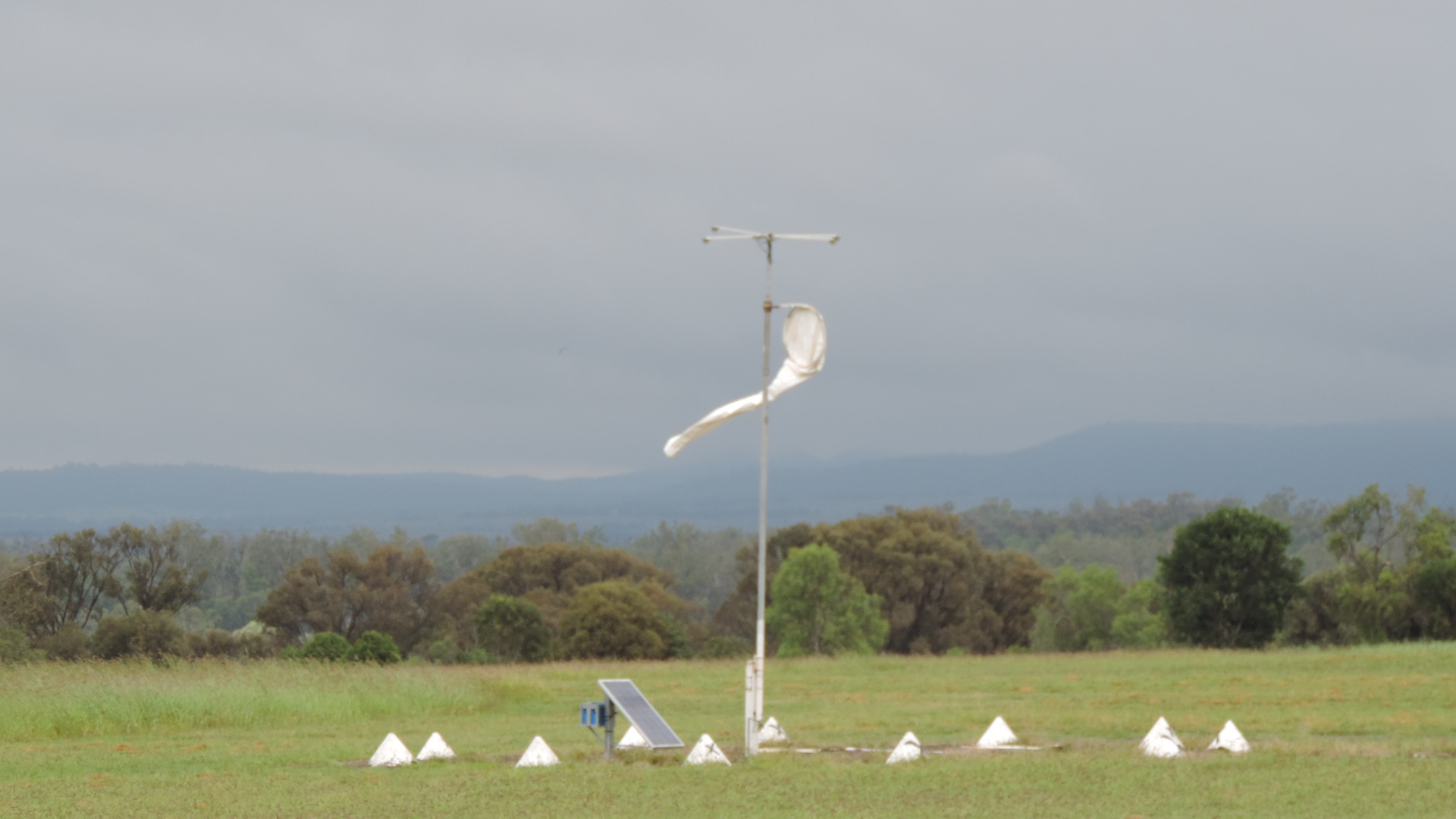
Theodore Airport, 2014

Despite the name, Theodore Airport (IATA: TDR, ICAO: YTDR) is located in neighbouring Lonesome Creek. No regular scheduled services operate from it. The community has raised funds to install solar-powered lighting so the runway can be used for medical emergency flights at night.

== Amenities ==
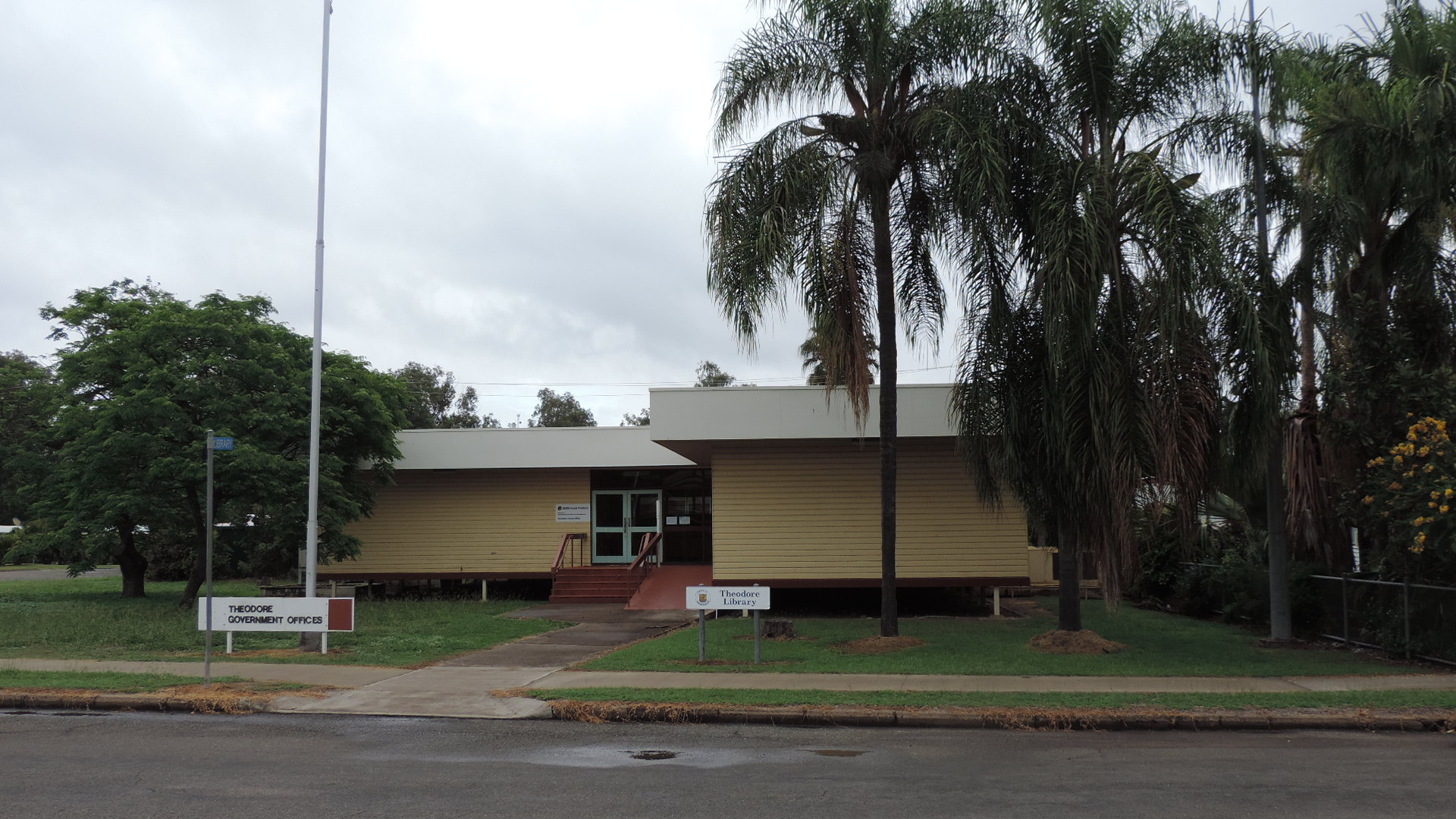
Library, Theodore, 2014

The Banana Shire Council operates a library on The Boulevard in Theodore.

== Attractions ==
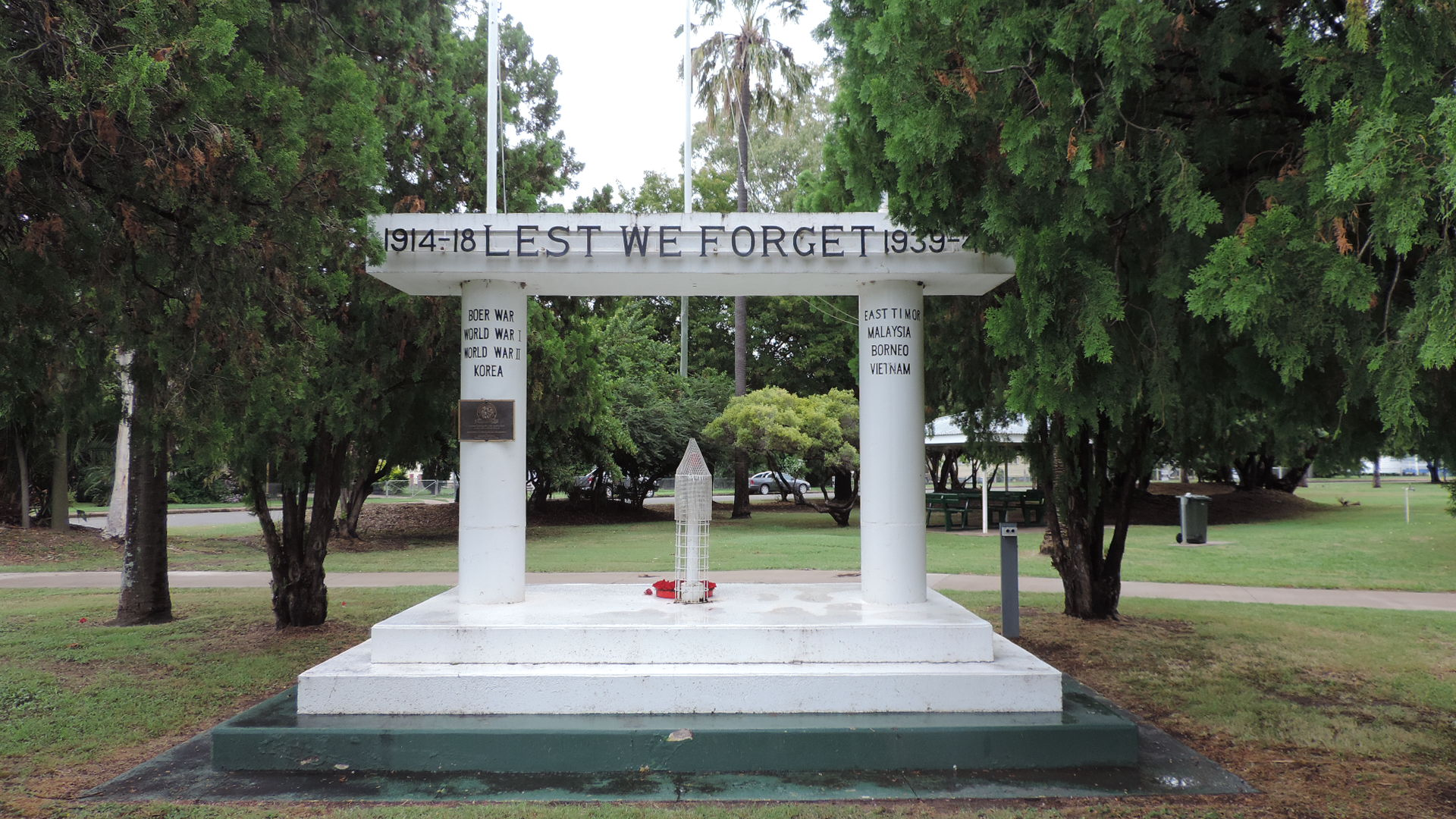
War memorial, 2014

The Theodore War Memorial commemorates Australians who have served in all wars and conflicts. It is located on the oval in the centre of The Boulevard (24.949055°S 150.075452°E).

== Events ==
The Theodore Annual Show is held each May; it is organised by the Theodore Show Society.

== Notable residents ==
- Mal Anderson, tennis champion at the 1957 U.S. National Championships, was born in Theodore
- Nev Hewitt, Member of the Queensland Legislative Assembly was born in Theodore
- Rob Simmons, 2008 - 2017 of the Queensland Reds, 2018 - member of the New South Wales Waratahs

== Gallery ==
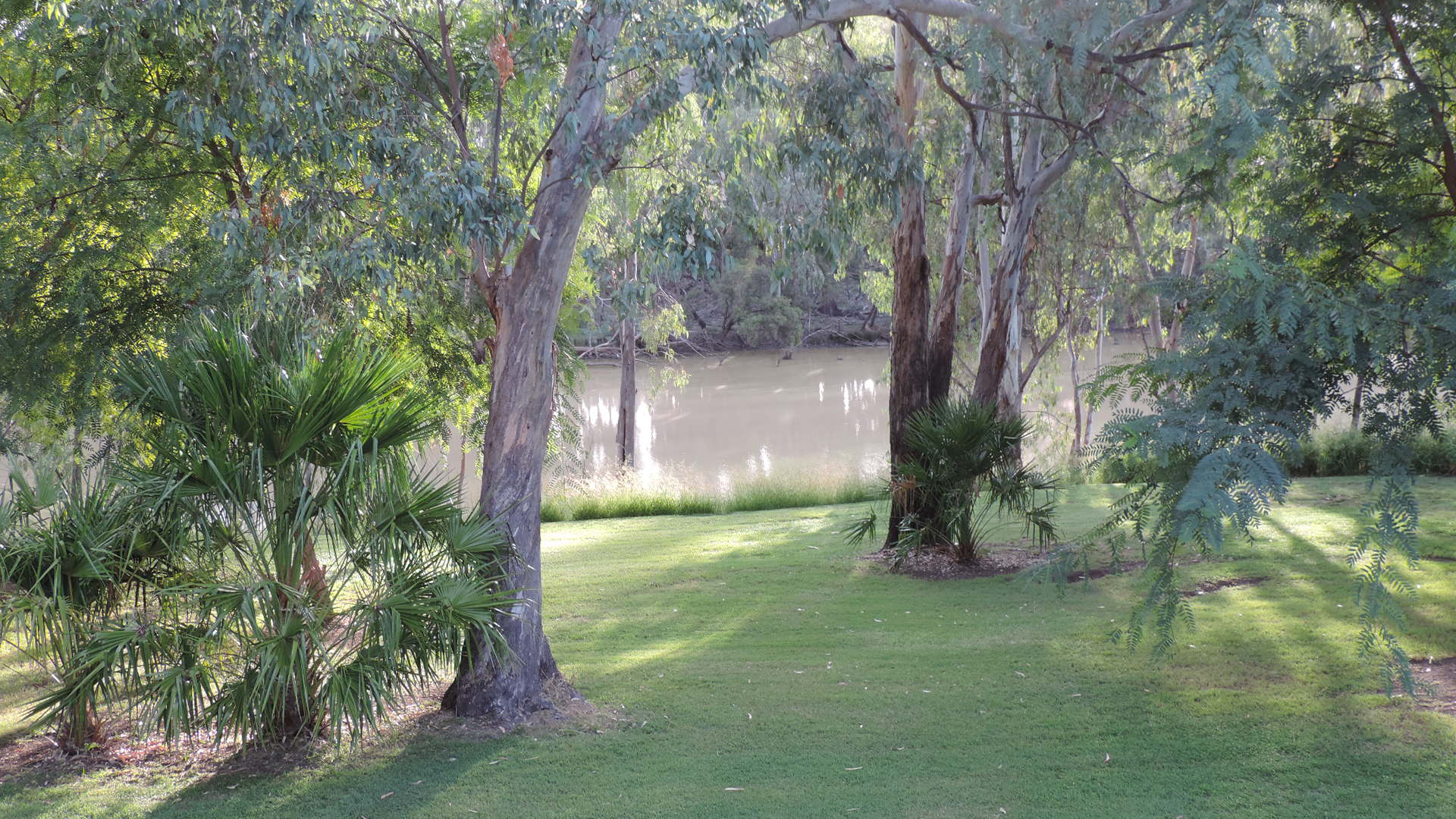
Dawson River at the back of the Hotel Theodore, 2014

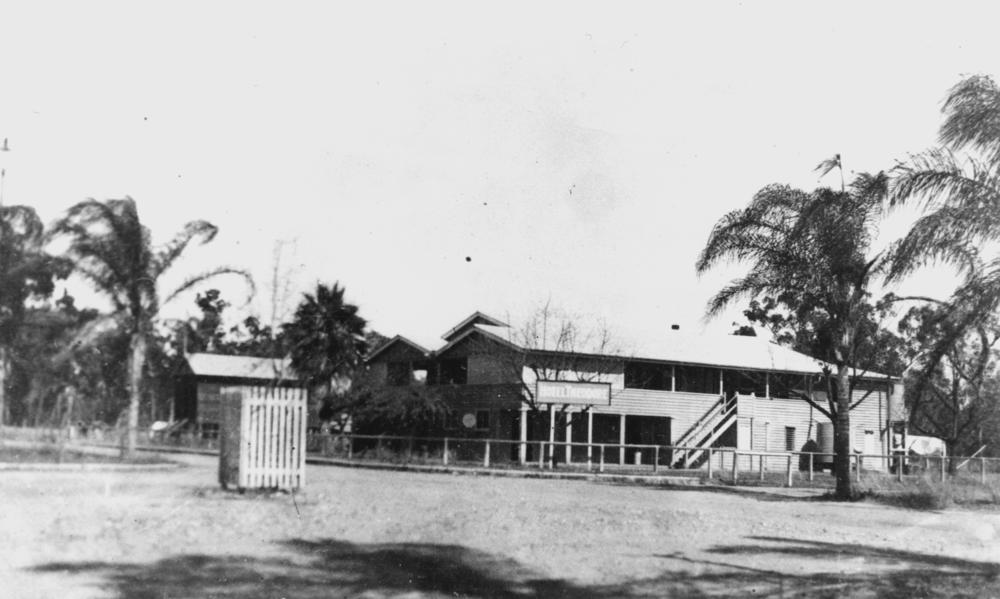
Hotel Theodore, 1938

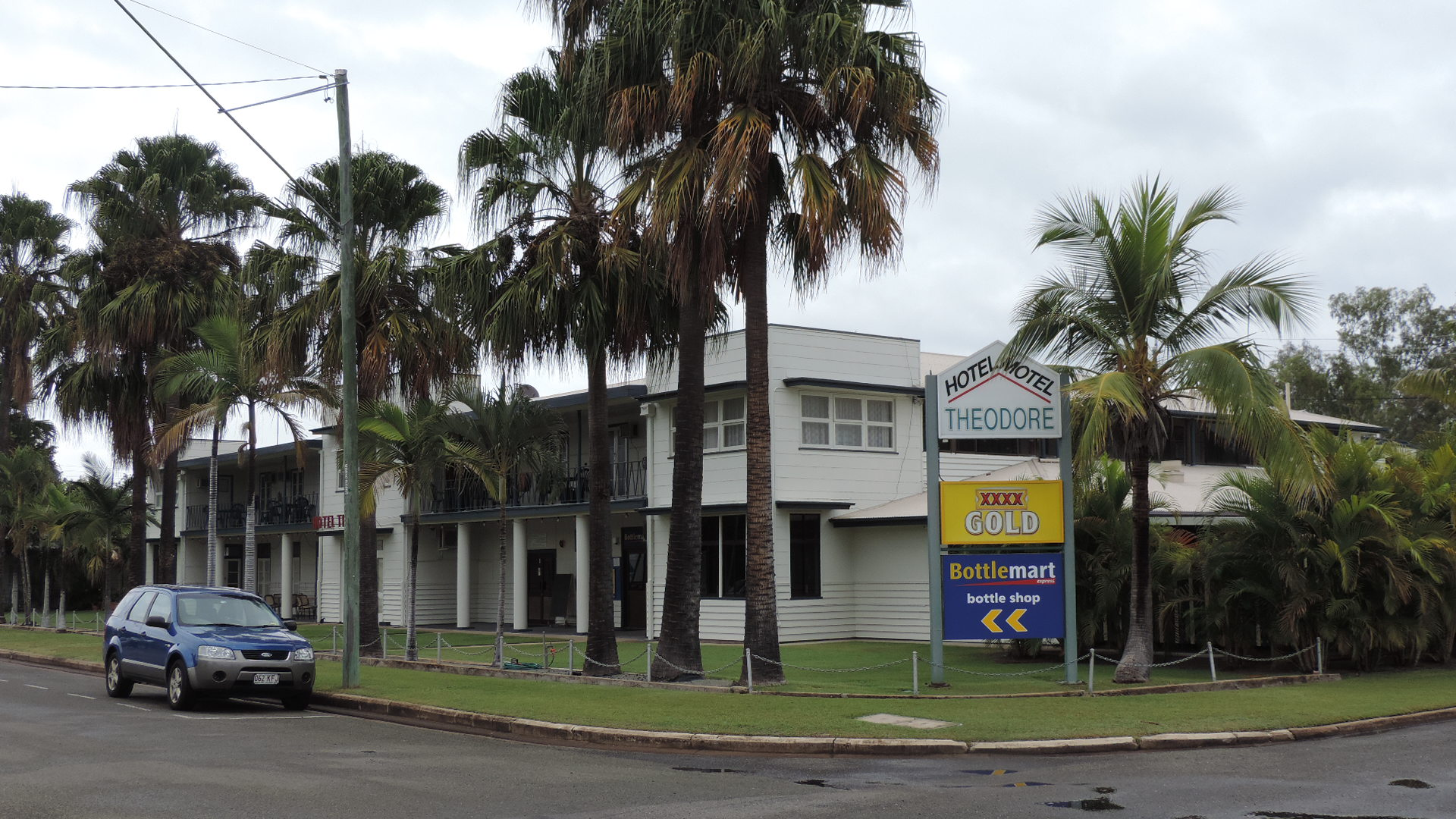
Hotel Theodore, 2014

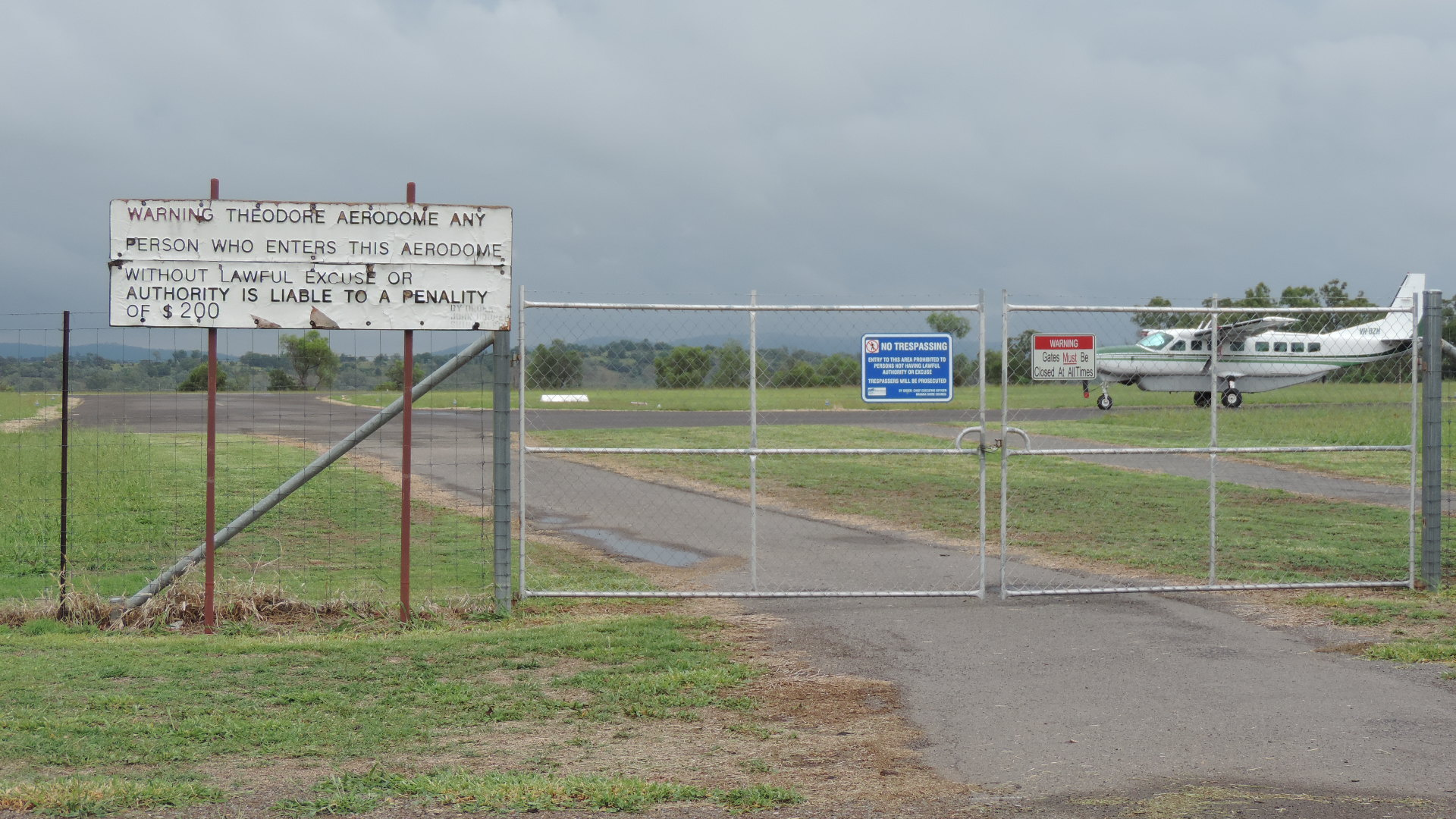
Airport, Theodore, 2014
