= Moura, Queensland =

Moura
- Town
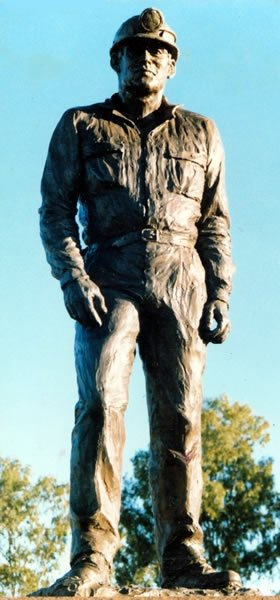
- Moura Monument

- Interactive map of Moura
- Coordinates: 24.5730°S 149.975°E
- Country: Australia
- State: Queensland
- LGA: Banana Shire
- Location: 66 km (41 mi) WSW of Biloela; 169 km (105 mi) SW of Rockhampton; 187 km (116 mi) WSW of Gladstone; 593 km (368 mi) NW of Brisbane
- Established: 1936

Government
  - State electorate: Callide
  - Federal division: Flynn

Area
  - Total: 408.7 km^{2} (157.8 sq mi)

Population
  - Total: 1,993 (2021 census locality)
  - Density: 4.8764/km^{2} (12.630/sq mi)
- Time zone: UTC+10:00 (AEST)
- Postcode: 4718
- Mean max temp: 32 °C (90 °F)
- Mean min temp: 12 °C (54 °F)
- Annual rainfall: 732 mm (28.8 in)
Localities around Moura
Alberta	Baralaba	Banana
Alberta	Moura	Banana
Warnoah	Kianga	Banana

Moura is a rural town and locality in the Shire of Banana in Central Queensland, Australia. It services the surrounding coal mining and rural activities. It is situated approximately 65 kilometres (40 mi) west of Biloela on the Dawson Highway, 186 kilometres (116 mi) west of the port city of Gladstone, and 171 kilometres (106 mi) south west of Rockhampton. In the 2021 census, the locality of Moura had a population of 1,993 people.

== Economy ==
A number of industries are represented in the local economy. Chief amongst these is coal mining. The name of the local coal mine changes each time it is sold, currently Dawson coal mine, owned and operated by AngloAmerical Coal. Only open-cut mining has been used since 1994. Beef, cotton and cereals are other major industries of the area.

== History ==
In 1854 Charles Marshall named his leased pastoral selection Moura. There are two theories regarding the origin of the name. One is that it is named after Moura in Portugal where he served in the British Army during the Peninsular Wars. The other is that it is an Aboriginal word meaning native camp dog.

The Moura property was developed into a homestead in 1880 by Edward Homer. The town was first established in 1936 as a farming centre near the existing Moura Station.

The Moura Post Office opened in late 1939.

Moura Provisional School was opened on 10 September 1940. It became Moura State School on 1 January 1948. In 1965 a secondary department was attached to the school. By 1975, there were sufficient secondary students to warrant a formal high school and so Moura State High School was opened on 25 January 1976 with 263 pupils.

=== Mining disasters ===
There have been three mining disasters that have occurred near Moura:

- The first was the Kianga mining disaster occurring due to an explosion in the underground workings of the Kianga No. 1 mine on 20 September 1975, claiming 13 miners' lives. On 11 March 1978, a memorial centre was officially opened in Moura to commemorate the disaster.
- The second, on 16 July 1986, was an explosion in the Moura No. 4 underground mine, claiming twelve miners' lives, the youngest miner being 18.
- The third was an explosion in the Moura No. 2 underground coal mine on 7 August 1994. Rescue and recovery attempts were abandoned after a second, more violent explosion occurred 18 hours later. Eleven miners' lives had been lost and the mine was sealed at the surface.

After 1994, underground mining ceased and the area was operated as an open-cut coal mine.

In November 2017, a routine blast in the mine resulted in ground movement leading to a "circular geotechnical failure" that resulted in a crack through a public access road across the open pit. The road had been a key access and freight route for farmers and graziers to reach the town of Moura, including a school bus route. The road remained closed in February 2018 and was expected to remain unstable indefinitely. The company had conducted improvements to a southern detour route, and consulted with the community about a viable long-term alternative. A new route was proposed which would cross the pit further north, but was expected to take 15 months to complete construction.

== Demographics ==
Year	Population	Notes
2001	1,787	
2006	1,774	
2011	1,899	
2016	1,786	
2021	1,993	

== Climate ==
Average yearly Rainfall: 732mm, raining an average of 63 days per year. The average summer temperature is 32 degrees Celsius (with temperatures in excess of 36 degrees Celsius a common occurrence during Dec–Jan). The average winter temperature is 22 degrees Celsius.

== Education ==
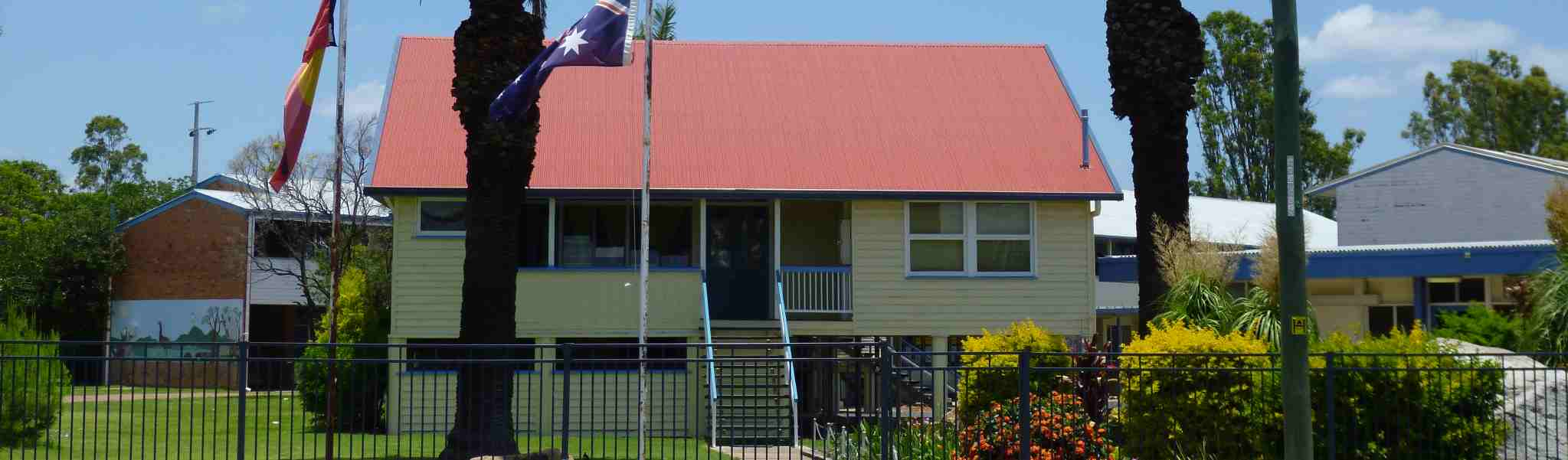
Moura State School, 2025

Moura State School is a government primary (Early Childhood–6) school for boys and girls at Gillespie Street (24.5717°S 149.9792°E). In 2018, the school had an enrolment of 242 students with 21 teachers (18 full-time equivalent) and 21 non-teaching staff (12 full-time equivalent). It includes a special education program.

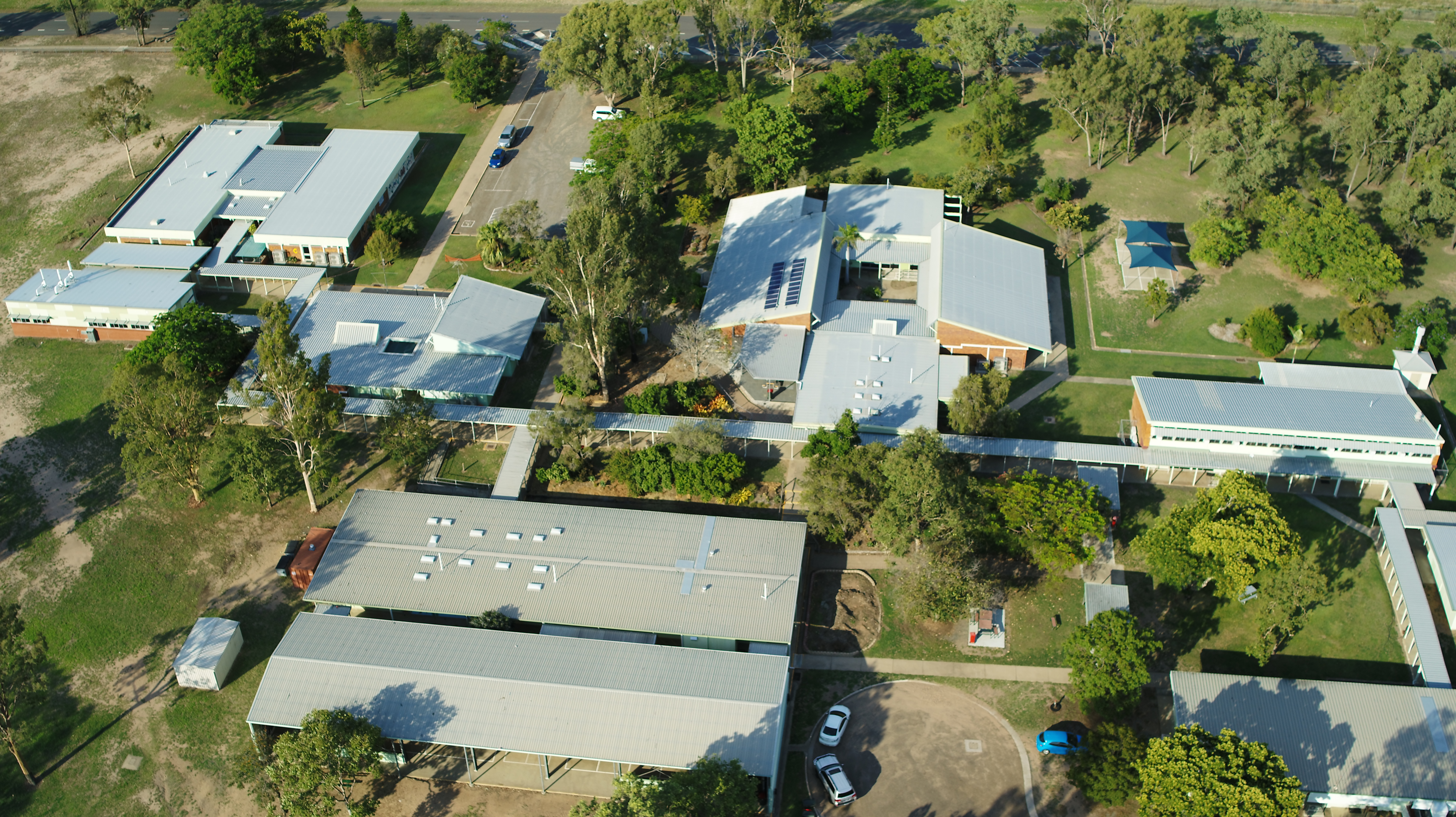
Moura State High School, 2025

Moura State High School is a government secondary (7–12) school for boys and girls at Gillespie Street (24.5750°S 149.9823°E). In 2018, the school had an enrolment of 172 students with 19 teachers (17 full-time equivalent) and 21 non-teaching staff (14 full-time equivalent).

== Attractions ==
=== Miners Memorial ===
A statue of a miner commemorates the Moura Underground No. 4 mine disaster. It was unveiled on 6 July 1986. It is on the Dawson Highway (24.57094°S 49.96930°E). It was sculpted by Diana Webber.

=== 150th meridian ===
The 150th meridian east, located just outside Moura, is popular among tourists as well as local residents to have their picture taken in the exact path of the longitude line. Rocks with drill holes have been lined up to represent the exact angle and location of longitude line.

=== APEX Park (river) ===
The APEX park is situated next to the Dawson River and is located 7 kilometres (4.3 mi) west on the Dawson highway. The APEX park has free camping grounds with facilities such as hot showers, a traditional wood barbecue, toilets and lawn for the afternoon picnic. It also has a public boat ramp.

=== Museum ===
The Moura Museum and Information Centre is located at 33 Gillespie Street. The museum presents Moura's agricultural and industrial history. A set of Japanese collectables provided by the Mitsui Mining Company are on display.

== Culture, Events and Festivals ==
=== Muddy Water Classic ===
Moura Muddy water classic is a fishing competition held annually on the 3rd weekend in February at the APEX park on the Dawson River. It brings many people from the surrounding areas for the local fishing competition.

=== Campdrafting ===
Moura hosts an annual campdraft in July.

=== Coal and Country Festival ===
The Coal and Country festival is held every year in the third week of August for seven days. The festival holds events like coal shovelling and a professional rodeo.

It is often held on the weekend of the third week with festivities beginning on the Friday afternoon and ending on the Sunday. It is held at the recreational grounds where cattle yards and large spaces are easily available

== Facilities ==
The Banana Shire Council has an administrative office in Gillespie Street. It operates a library at MacArthur Street.

The town also has many shops, including banks, post office, video store, grocery store, newsagent, beauticians, hairdressers, butcher, service station, electrical, furniture and hardware store and many more. Moura also has numerous sporting clubs (golf, bowls, squash, football) as well as eateries and restaurants. There is also a RSL and Memorial (now closed) club for socialising.

== Facilities ==
Moura Cemetery (also known as Moura Lawn Cemetery) is at 126 Theodore Moura Road (24.5742°S 149.9839°E). It is managed by the Banana Shire Council.

== Town Twinning ==
- Moura, Portugal
