= Dumpy Creek, Queensland =

Dumpy Creek
- Suburb
- Interactive map of Dumpy Creek
- Coordinates: 23.9894°S 150.0438°E
- Country: Australia
- State: Queensland
- LGA: Shire of Banana
- Location: 46.2 km (28.7 mi) NW of Baralaba; 71.1 km (44.2 mi) SW of Mount Morgan; 94.1 km (58.5 mi) NW of Biloela; 109 km (68 mi) SW of Rockhampton; 663 km (412 mi) NNW of Brisbane

Government
  - State electorate: Callide
  - Federal division: Flynn

Area
  - Total: 293.9 km^{2} (113.5 sq mi)

Population
  - Total: 16 (2021 census)
  - Density: 0.0544/km^{2} (0.141/sq mi)
- Time zone: UTC+10:00 (AEST)
- Postcode: 4702
Suburbs around Dumpy Creek
Gainsford	Pheasant Creek	Wowan
Kokotungo	Dumpy Creek	Wowan
Kokotungo	Kokotungo	Goovigen

Dumpy Creek is a rural locality in the Shire of Banana, Queensland, Australia. In the 2021 census, Dumpy Creek had a population of 16 people.

== Geography ==
The Don River enters the locality from the south-east (Goovigen), forming the south-eastern boundary of the localty, before exiting to Kokotungo to the south-west. The river then re-enters from the west (Kokotungo) and forms part of the north-western boundary of the locality before exiting to the north-west (Kokotungo / Gainsford) where it becomes a tributary of the Dawson River.

The Dee River enters the locality from the east (Wowan) and becomes a tributary of the Don River on the south-eastern boundary of the locality.

The Leichhardt Highway enters the locality from the south-east (Goovigen), cuts across the south-eastern corner of the locality, and then exits to the east (Wowan).

The Gogango Range and the Rannes Range form the eastern boundary of the locality. There are two named peaks along the boundary (from north to south):

- Mount Blowhard (24.0028°S 150.0833°E) 379 metres (1,243 ft)
- Mount Rannes (24.0931°S 150.1103°E) 190 metres (620 ft)

The land use is predominantly grazing on native vegetation.

== History ==
The locality is presumably named after the creek (23.9833°S 150.0000°E).

== Demographics ==
In the 2016 census, Dumpy Creek had a population of 11 people.

In the 2021 census, Dumpy Creek had a population of 16 people.

== Education ==
There are no schools in Dumpy Creek. The nearest government primary schools are Wowan State School in neighbouring Wowan to the east and Goovigen State School in neighbouring Goovigen to the south-east. The nearest government secondary school is Baralaba State School (to Year 10) in Baralaba to the south-west. There are no nearby schools offering education to Year 12; the alternatives are distance education and boarding school.
