= Rannes, Queensland =

Rannes Queensland
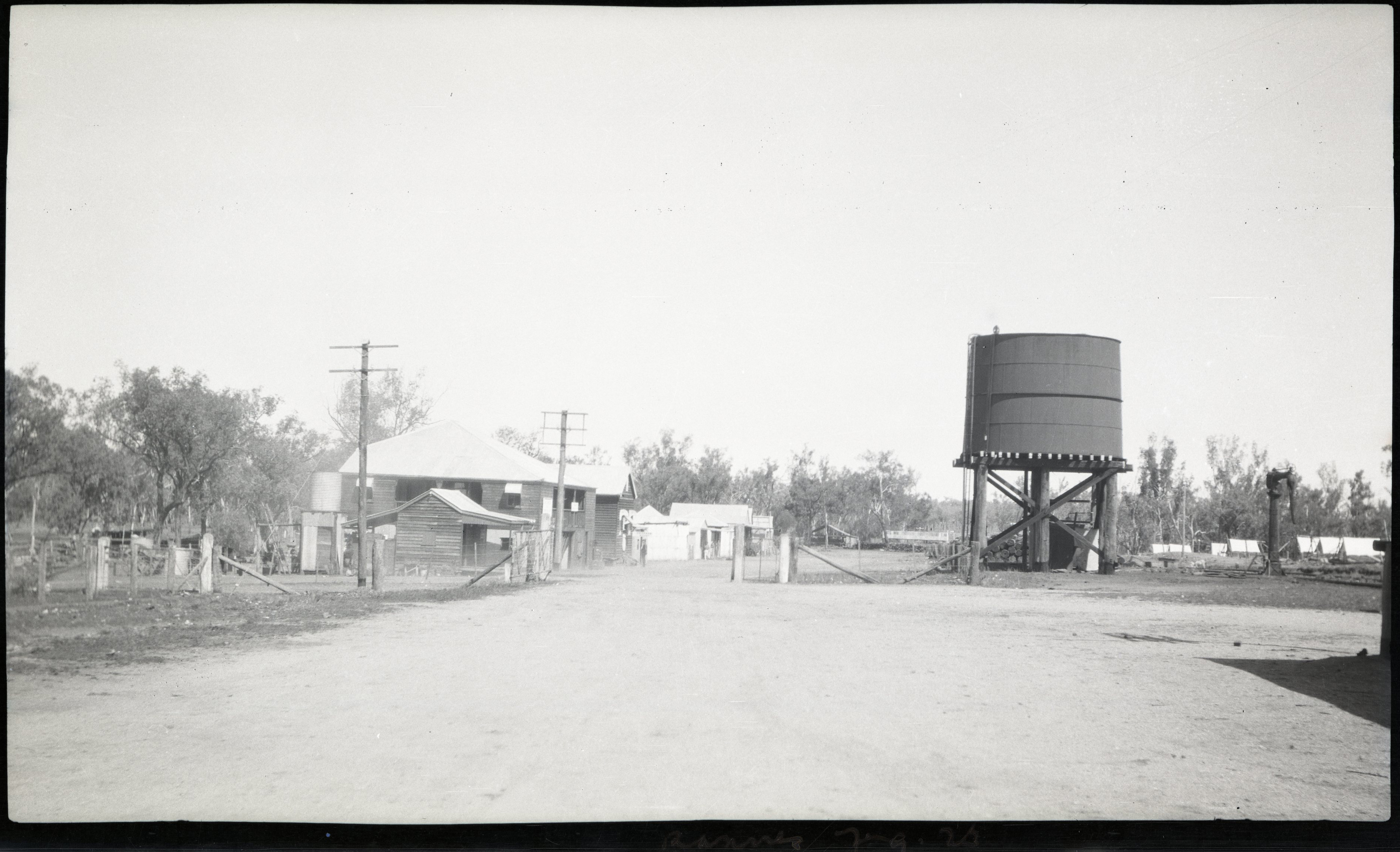
- Township of Rannes, 1923

- Coordinates: 24.0986°S 150.12°E
- Postcode(s): 4702
- Time zone: AEST (UTC+10:00)
- Location: 19.2 km (12 mi) W of Goovigen (town); 37.5 km (23 mi) ENE of Baralaba; 59.3 km (37 mi) NW of Biloela; 104 km (65 mi) SW of Rockhampton; 628 km (390 mi) NNW of Brisbane
- LGA(s): Shire of Banana
- State electorate(s): Fitzroy
- Federal division(s): Flynn

Rannes is a rural town in the west of the locality of Goovigen in the Shire of Banana, Queensland, Australia.

== Geography ==
Rannes is in Central Queensland between Wowan and Banana on the Leichhardt Highway and the Don River.

== History ==
Rannes was established as a pastoral sheep station property in April 1853 by Scottish brothers James, Norman and Charles Leith Hay. The brothers were the offspring of Peninsula War veteran Andrew Leith Hay and the grandsons of General Alexander Leith Hay of Leith Hall. They were the first Europeans to occupy the region and at that time Rannes was the northern-most outpost of British colonisation in Eastern Australia. The brothers named the property Rannes after a Leith Hay family manor house located near Buckie in Scotland.

On 11 May 1853, James Leith Hay sent a letter to Lieutenant John Murray, reporting that two of his shepherds had been murdered by Aborigine men and requested the services of the Native Police. On 16 May, Murray and a section of troopers arrived at Rannes Station. Two days later, Murray went in search for those responsible. In November 1853, James Leith Hay requested a section of Native Police be posted permanently at Rannes after two men were killed and one hundred sheep stolen. A sort of peace ensued and some of the local tribes were allowed onto the property. On the night of 23 September 1855, the Native Police barracks at Rannes was attacked by a large number of Aboriginal men, killing three troopers and leaving all but one wounded. Murray then led the Native Police and pursued Aborigines "who had taken forcible possession of a station and were prevented from murdering the inhabitants by the timely arrival of the troopers." Sub-Lieutenant Walker also led a patrol to search for the murderers but did not find them.

The town of Rannes was surveyed by surveyor A.F. Wood in July 1860 and the town reserve was gazetted 2 October 1860 (page 396).

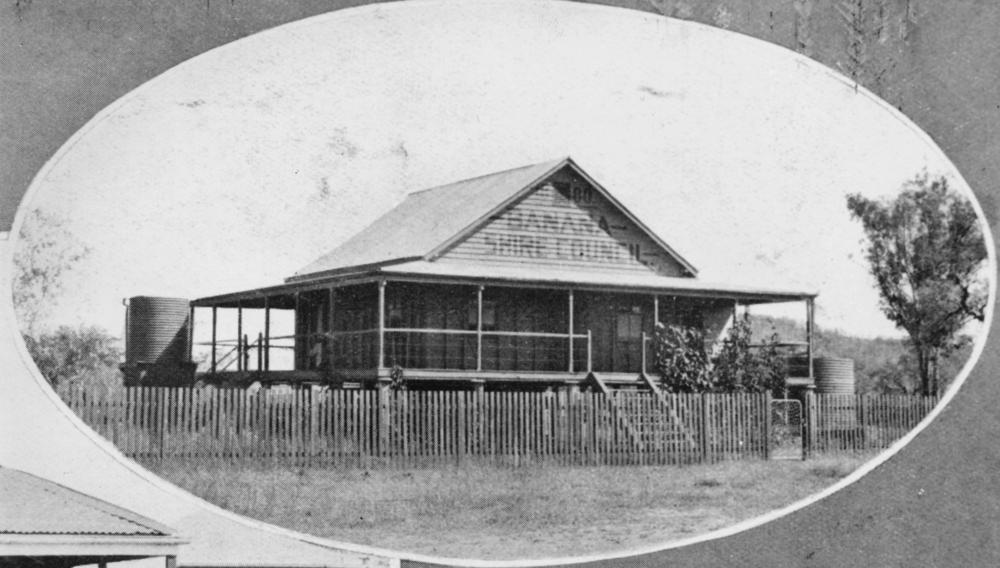
Shire Council building, Rannes, circa 1930

Rannes was once a major railway town at the junction of the Dawson Valley railway line and the Callide Valley railway line. Both railway lines having been abandoned, the Rannes railway station is no longer extant (24.1035°S 150.1182°E).

In 1880, the local government area Banana Division (later the Shire of Banana) was established with its headquarters in Banana (taking its name from the town). However, in 1930 the shire headquarters became Rannes and the shire offices were physically relocated from Banana to Rannes. Since 1946, the shire has its headquarters in Biloela.

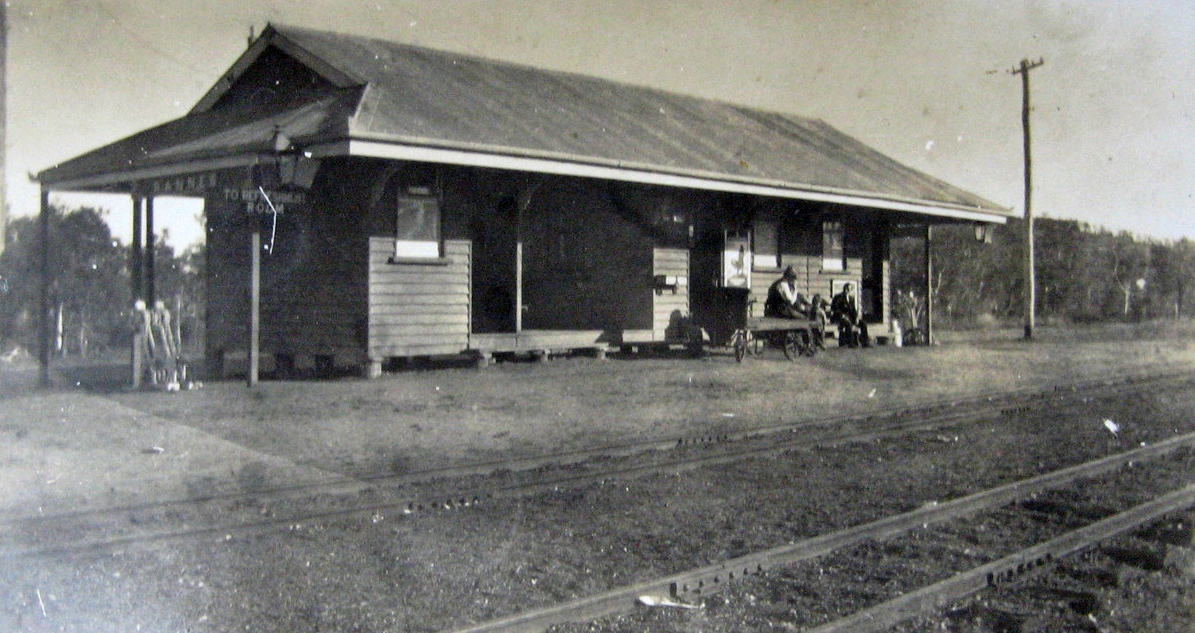
Rannes railway station, circa 1940s

Rannes railway station was originally named Kuyul, but was changed 29 April 1915.

Rannes State School opened on 14 March 1916. It closed on 23 February 1960 but reopened on 30 January 1962. It closed permanently on 18 March 1966. It was on the northern side of Goovigen Rannes Road and the railway line (approx 24.10208°S 150.12252°E).

Woolein State School opened on 27 February 1918 and closed on 17 August 1924.

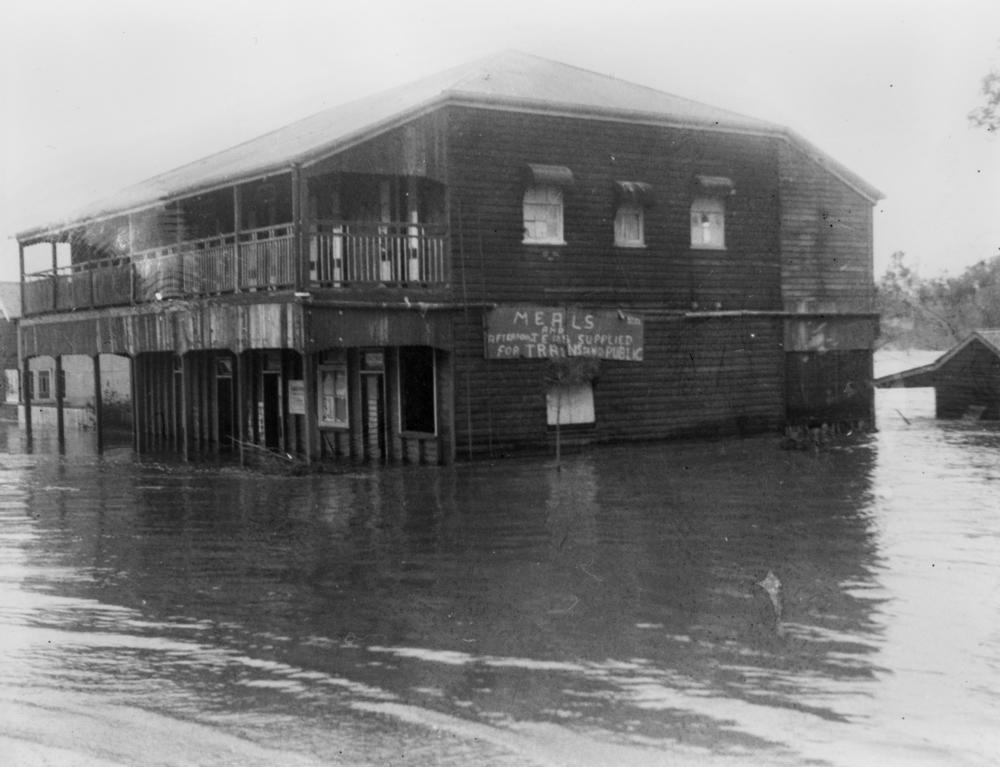
Rannes Hotel at the height of the flood, 1949

Rannes was badly flooded in February 1942 due to heavy rainfall in the Callide Valley swelling the Dee and Don Rivers to be over a mile wide and 46 feet (14 m) deep and flowing very fast. The townspeople were evacuated using the stranded mail train which moved to the higher ground for a night and a day before they could return. Many buildings were flooded, some to two storeys, and many smaller buildings had been washed away. Hundreds of cattle were washed away with some found in caught in trees 40 feet (12 m) above the ground.There was so much damage to roads, railways, bridges and telephone lines, that Rannes residents were unable to request assistance, but the police from Wowan managed to get through to bring essential provisions to Rannes.

In March 1949, Rannes was badly flooded again, but the river height was 2 feet (0.61 m) lower than in the 1942 flood. The Rannes railway bridge was covered by 4 feet (1.2 m) of water, stranding all trains.

== Economy ==
Rannes is primarily a farming town which specialises in the beef and grain industry.

== Education ==
There are no schools in Rannes. The nearest government primary school is Goovigen State School in the town of Goovigen to the east. The nearest government secondary schools are Baralaba State School (to Year 10) in Baralaba to the west and Biloela State High School (to Year 12) in Biloela to the south-east.
