= Woolein =

- Suburb
- Interactive map of Woolein
- Coordinates: 24.2547°S 150.1644°E
- Country: Australia
- State: Queensland
- LGA: Shire of Banana
- Location: 46.3 km (28.8 mi) NE of Moura; 48.7 km (30.3 mi) NW of Biloela; 122 km (76 mi) SSW of Rockhampton; 626 km (389 mi) NNW of Brisbane

Government
  - State electorate: Callide
  - Federal division: Flynn

Area
  - Total: 119.6 km^{2} (46.2 sq mi)

Population
  - Total: 0 (2021 census)
  - Density: 0.000/km^{2} (0.000/sq mi)
- Time zone: UTC+10:00 (AEST)
- Postcode: 4702
Suburbs around Woolein
Kokotungo	Goovigen	Goovigen
Kokotungo	Woolein	Greycliffe
Banana	Banana	Orange Creek

Woolein is a rural locality in the Shire of Banana, Queensland, Australia. In the 2021 census, Woolein had "no people or a very low population".

== Geography ==
The Pinnacles are a group of three peaks in the south-west of the locality (24.2701°S 150.1420°E), ranging from 305 to 315 metres (1,001 to 1,033 ft) above sea level.

The Leichhardt Highway enters the locality from the south (Banana) and travels north-west through the locality, forming the north-western boundary of the locality before exiting to the north-west (Kokotungo / Goovigen).

The land use is predominantly grazing on native vegetation.

== History ==
The locality was officially named and bounded by the Minister for Natural Resources in June 1999.

Woolein State School opened on 27 February 1918 and closed on 17 August 1924.

== Demographics ==
In the 2016 census, Woolein had a population of 7 people.

In the 2021 census, Woolein had "no people or a very low population".

== Education ==
There are no schools in Woolein. The nearest government primary school is Banana State School in neighbouring Banana to the south. The nearest government secondary schools are Baralaba State School (to Year 10) in Baralaba to the west, Moura State High School (to Year 12) in Moura to the south-west, and Biloela State High School (to Year 12) in Biloela to the south-east. However, some students might be too distant to access schools providing education to Year 12; the alternatives are distance education and boarding school.
