= Gainsford, Queensland =

Gainsford
- Suburb
- Interactive map of Gainsford
- Coordinates: 23.8611°S 149.9125°E
- Country: Australia
- State: Queensland
- LGA: Central Highlands Region
- Location: 48.3 km (30.0 mi) N of Baralaba; 108 km (67 mi) SW of Rockhampton; 184 km (114 mi) ESE of Emerald; 674 km (419 mi) NW of Brisbane

Government
  - State electorate: Gregory
  - Federal division: Flynn

Area
  - Total: 400.5 km^{2} (154.6 sq mi)

Population
  - Total: 32 (2021 census)
  - Density: 0.0799/km^{2} (0.207/sq mi)
- Time zone: UTC+10:00 (AEST)
- Postcode: 4702
Suburbs around Gainsford
Duaringa	Boolburra	Gogango
Duaringa	Gainsford	Pheasant Creek
Barnard	Kokotungo	Dumpy Creek

Gainsford is a rural locality in the Central Highlands Region, Queensland, Australia. In the 2021 census, Gainsford had a population of 32 people.

== Geography ==
The Dawson River forms the western boundary, while the Don River forms part of the southern on its way to join the Dawson.

The Capricorn Highway runs along the northern boundary, entering from Boolbura and exiting to Duaringa.

The land use is grazing on native vegetation.

== History ==
Early in the 1860s, there was a crossing over the Dawson River in the area and a hotel was established to service travellers. In 1866, the Queensland Government were selling 63 town lots, averaging 2 roods (22,000 sq ft; 2,000 m^{2}) each, in the town of Gainsford (23.79404°S 149.76644°E) on the east bank of the Dawson River. However, the opening of the Central Western railway line from Boolburra to Duaringa across the Dawson River in 1876 ended Gainsford's role as a crossing point and the hotel closed. In 1908, 10 acres (4.0 ha) of the town were leased for a boiling-down works. As at 2025, the site of the town is within a pastoral property called Gainsford.

== Demographics ==
In the 2016 census, Gainsford had a population of 14 people.

In the 2021 census, Gainsford had a population of 32 people.

== Education ==
There are no schools in Gainsford. The nearest government primary schools are Duaringa State School in neighbouring Duaringa to the north-west, Gogango State School in neighbouring Gogango to the north-east, and Baralaba State School in Baralaba to the south. The nearest government secondary school is Baralaba State School (to Year 10). However, it would to be too distant for a daily commute for students living in the north and east of Gainsford; the alternatives are distance education and boarding school.
