= Ulogie, Queensland =

Ulogie
- Suburb
- Interactive map of Ulogie
- Coordinates: 23.9427°S 150.5152°E
- Country: Australia
- State: Queensland
- LGA: Shire of Banana
- Location: 41.5 km (25.8 mi) ESE of Wowan; 74.7 km (46.4 mi) S of Mount Morgan; 85.2 km (52.9 mi) N of Biloela; 112 km (70 mi) S of Rockhampton; 663 km (412 mi) NNW of Brisbane

Government
  - State electorate: Callide
  - Federal division: Flynn

Area
  - Total: 651.7 km^{2} (251.6 sq mi)

Population
  - Total: 31 (2021 census)
  - Density: 0.0476/km^{2} (0.1232/sq mi)
- Time zone: UTC+10:00 (AEST)
- Postcode: 4702
Suburbs around Ulogie
Wura; Dululu	Fletcher Creek	Bajool
Dixalea; Goovigen	Ulogie	Raglan
Jambin	Dumgree	Mount Alma

Ulogie is a rural locality in the Shire of Banana, Queensland, Australia. In the 2021 census, Ulogie had a population of 31 people.

== Geography ==
The locality is loosely bounded to the north by the Gelobera Range, to the north-east by the Ulam Range, to the east by the Calliope Range, and to the south-east by the Don River.

The terrain is mountainous ranging from 130 to 648 metres (427 to 2,126 ft) above sea level with a number of named peaks:

- Bens Knob (23.9593°S 150.5749°E) 506 metres (1,660 ft)
- Black Mountain (23.9723°S 150.6474°E) 648 metres (2,126 ft)
- Mount Alma (23.8789°S 150.4090°E) 411 metres (1,348 ft)
- Mount Gelobera (Reillys Hill) (23.8516°S 150.5261°E) 539 metres (1,768 ft)
- Mount Isabel (23.8503°S 150.5994°E) 508 metres (1,667 ft)
- Mount Pleasant (23.8737°S 150.4359°E) 218 metres (715 ft)
- North Pimple (23.8795°S 150.5679°E) 454 metres (1,490 ft)
- The Peak (23.9580°S 150.5109°E) 288 metres (945 ft)
- Ulogie North (23.8674°S 150.4052°E) 433 metres (1,421 ft)

The Don River State Forest is in the east of the locality and extends into neighbouring localities of Raglan to the east and Dumgree to the south. Apart from this protected area, the land use is grazing on native vegetation.

== History ==
The locality name derives from the railway station name assigned by the Queensland Railways Department on 9 October 1914, supposedly a name of Scottish origin.

== Demographics ==
In the 2016 census, Ulogie had a population of 28 people.

In the 2021 census, Ulogie had a population of 31 people.

== Education ==
There are no schools in Ulogie. The nearest government primary school is Wowan State School in Wowan to the west. The nearest government secondary school is Mount Morgan State High School in Mount Morgan to the north, but only students living in the north-west of Ulogie would be within range for a daily commute; the alternatives are distance education and boarding school.
