= Alwyn Torenbeek =

Australian drover (1937–2015)

William Alwyn Torenbeek (1937–2015) was an Australian drover, horse whisperer, endurance rider, bronc rider and author.

== Early life ==
Torenbeek grew up on the Myella cattle station near Kokotungo in the Baralaba district of Central Queensland. He left home at the age of 14. Torenbeek began taming wild horses at the age of 11, and by the age of 17, he had accumulated and tamed approximately 70 wild horses. Due to being from Kokotungo, he was regularly referred to as "The Kokotungo Kid" throughout his career.

== Career ==
=== Rodeo riding ===
Torenbeek's interest in Australian rodeos came from watching rodeo riders as a child at events in Mount Morgan and Rockhampton. From the age of 14, he competed in rodeos as a full-time roughrider, winning the New South Wales state championship at the age of 18. He continued his success, becoming national champion by the time he was 21 years old, leading to Torenbeek becoming quite well known throughout the 1950s particularly in Regional Australia where rodeo was a popular competitive sport. Although Torenbeek preferred rodeo riding, he said he was physically unable to partake in the sport once he reached the age of 30, and instead moved into endurance riding.

=== Endurance riding ===
He first competed in the annual Tom Quilty Gold Cup Endurance Ride in the event's second year in 1967 after encouragement from organiser R.M. Williams. Aside from a 20-year break while he was working as a drover in the Gulf Country Torenbeek continued to be involved in the event until his death in 2015. Torenbeek's endurance riding efforts in the Tom Quilty were featured in a Landline story in 2008 when he competed in a team consisting of his grandson Luke Torenbeek, Japanese rider Yukinobu Horiuchi and The Lord of the Rings stunt rider Trevor Copland from New Zealand. Throughout his many years competing in the Tom Quilty, Torenbeek won the prized belt buckle several times. In 2013, Torenbeek claimed he had fulfilled his dream goals by the time he was 22, but still wanted to win two more Tom Quilty Gold Cup belt buckles and ride in the Old Dominion endurance ride held in Virginia. In 2013, Torenbeek stated he preferred the 120-kilometre events, rather than the 80-kilometre and or 160-kilometre events although he had been recently enjoying competing in the longer 160-kilometre event.

=== Youth at Risk program ===
In the 1970s, Torenbeek was approached by the Department of Aboriginal Affairs to manage a "Youth at Risk" program, teaching skills associated with working on a remote cattle property to young "at risk" Aboriginal Australians. Torenbeek used slightly unorthodox methods in the way he taught basic literacy and numeracy, which differed from a traditional classroom setting. To help improve the literacy skills of the students, Torenbeek encouraged them to write letters home instead of using the telephone, and as a way to improve their numeracy skills, he encouraged them to use basic mathematical skills while learning how to do physical work in the field, such as counting cattle.

=== 1975 accident ===
In 1975, while waiting for a truck to reverse into a ramp to load horses for a charity race meeting, Torenbeek bent down to unlock one of the pins on the truck's livestock crate before it had completely come to a stop. The driver kept reversing and the rear of the truck struck Torenbeek's head, crushing it between the back of the truck and the ramp. Torenbeek's skull broke in three places, his ear drums burst and bled from the mouth, eyes and ears. Torenbeek was assisted into another vehicle which rushed to meet the ambulance which had been dispatched from Theodore to transfer Torenbeek to Rockhampton.

In a 2013 interview on Conversations, Torenbeek told Richard Fidler that he believed that he had several out-of-body experiences immediately following the accident. He claimed to remember watching himself lying in the back of the ambulance, with his wife by his side, and recalled conversations that took place between his wife and the paramedics. Torenbeek also claimed that he was reunited with his late father who had died several years earlier, and that they sat together during the ambulance journey.

=== Life in the Saddle ===
In 2013, Torenbeek released his memoirs entitled Life in the Saddle: Adventures of the legendary horseman, the Kokotungo Kid.

He decided to write his life story after consistent coaxing from his family. Torenbeek returned to "Myella", the cattle property where he grew up near the former town of Kokotungo in the Baralaba district to write his memoirs. When he finished, he submitted his hand written notes to R.M. Williams Outback journalist David Gilchrist who is credited with co-authoring the book with Torenbeek.

During publicity for the book, it was revealed that during his career Torenbeek had formed friendships with Australian bushman R.M. Williams and Aboriginal elder and fellow horseman Wally Mailman.

== Death ==
Torenbeek was killed in an accident on a rural property at Canoona north-west of Rockhampton on 9 October 2015. The accident is believed to have occurred when Torenbeek inadvertently pressed the accelerator while attempting to move over to the passenger side of the vehicle he was in, causing it to collide into a post.

A public memorial service was held at Rockhampton's Great Western Hotel.

In lieu of flowers, mourners were encouraged to donate money to the Rehabilitation Centre at Rockhampton Hospital.

== Legacy ==
Torenbeek is listed in the Australian Stockman's Hall of Fame, the Australian rodeo Hall of Fame and the Australian Equestrian Hall of Fame.

Torenbeek has several descendants who are involved in endurance riding including his grandson Luke Torenbeek who competed in a team with his grandfather at the 2008 Tom Quilty Endurance Ride and his granddaughter Kelsey Irvine who aside from being an elite endurance rider, has travelled internationally pursuing horse-related employment.
