= Dixalea, Queensland =

Dixalea
- Suburb
- Interactive map of Dixalea
- Coordinates: 23.9538°S 150.3152°E
- Country: Australia
- State: Queensland
- LGA: Shire of Banana
- Location: 47.7 km (29.6 mi) SSW of Mount Morgan; 58.5 km (36.4 mi) NNW of Biloela; 85.1 km (52.9 mi) SSW of Rockhampton; 639 km (397 mi) NNW of Brisbane

Government
  - State electorate: Callide
  - Federal division: Flynn

Area
  - Total: 229.3 km^{2} (88.5 sq mi)

Population
  - Total: 102 (2021 census)
  - Density: 0.4448/km^{2} (1.152/sq mi)
- Time zone: UTC+10:00 (AEST)
- Postcode: 4702
Suburbs around Dixalea
Dululu	Dululu	Ulogie
Wowan	Dixalea	Ulogie
Goovigen	Goovigen	Goovigen

Dixalea is a rural locality in the Shire of Banana, Queensland, Australia. In the 2021 census, Dixalea had a population of 102 people.

== Geography ==
The Dee River forms the north-western boundary of the locality. The Don River enters the locality from the east (Ulogie) and exits to the west (Wowan / Goovigen).

The Burnett Highway enters the locality from the north (Dululu) and exits to the south (Goovigen).

The terrain ranges from 110 to 240 metres (360 to 790 ft) above sea level. The locality is mostly flat with the higher elevations in the north-east of the locality.

The land use is predominantly crop growing around the rivers with the remainder of the locality being used for grazing on native vegetation.

== History ==
Don River State School opened on 21 August 1916 with an initial enrolment of 50 students. It closed on 25 January 1932, but reopened on 18 April 1933 having been relocated to a more central position on Mcdonalds Road (23.9720°S 150.3080°E). It closed again in 1952 and reopened in 1958 before finally closing on 5 June 1964, by which time it had been relocated south of the Don River to Tomlins Road (approx 23.9920°S 150.3065°E).

Dixie State School opened on 30 October 1923. In 1924, it was renamed Dixalea State School. It closed in 1938. It was at approx 120 Dixalea Doreen Road (23.9457°S 150.2923°E).

== Demographics ==
In the 2016 census, Dixalea had a population of 92 people.

In the 2021 census, Dixalea had a population of 102 people.

== Education ==
There are no schools in Dixalea. The nearest government primary schools are Wowan State School in neighbouring Wowan to the east, Goovigen State School in neighbouring Goovigen to the south-west, and Jambin State School in Jambin to the south. The nearest government secondary schools are Mount Morgan State High School in Mount Morgan to the north and Biloela State High School in Biloela to the south-east.
