= Pheasant Creek, Queensland =

Pheasant Creek
- Suburb
- Interactive map of Pheasant Creek
- Coordinates: 23.8058°S 150.1013°E
- Country: Australia
- State: Queensland
- LGA: Shire of Banana
- Location: 12.5 km (7.8 mi) NW of Wowan; 54.6 km (33.9 mi) SW of Mount Morgan; 76.5 km (47.5 mi) SW of Rockhampton; 84.6 km (52.6 mi) NNW of Biloela; 654 km (406 mi) NNW of Brisbane

Government
  - State electorate: Callide
  - Federal division: Flynn

Area
  - Total: 305.3 km^{2} (117.9 sq mi)

Population
  - Total: 48 (2021 census)
  - Density: 0.1572/km^{2} (0.407/sq mi)
- Time zone: UTC+10:00 (AEST)
- Postcode: 4702
Suburbs around Pheasant Creek
Gogango	Westwood	Westwood
Gainsford	Pheasant Creek	Dululu
Dumpy Creek	Wowan	Wowan

Pheasant Creek is a rural locality in the Shire of Banana, Queensland, Australia. In the 2021 census, Pheasant Creek had a population of 48 people.

== Geography ==
The Leichhardt Highway runs along part of the eastern boundary.

The locality takes its name from the watercourse Pheasant Creek which rises in the south-west of the locality and flows through the locality, exiting to the north-east (Westwood). The creek in turn was named after the hundreds of scrub turkeys (called "pheasants" by the local people) that inhabited the creek banks. Early settlers ate the birds.

Pheasant Creek has the following mountains:

- Mount Wheal (23.8701°S 150.0682°E), rising to 609 metres (1,998 ft) above sea level
- Mount Spencer (23.9225°S 150.0862°E), 598 metres (1,962 ft)

The land use is predominantly grazing on native vegetation with a small amount of crop growing.

== History ==
Pheasant Creek Provisional School opened circa 1919, but closed circa 1921. It was a tent school, which was relocated to Benarabin. After much local lobbying, in 1925, a new school building was erected and opened as Pheasant Creek State School, but it had closed by 1928 with the building proposed to be relocated to Biloela. Lobbying for a school resumed in 1936. In April 1940, tenders were called for a new school building (possibly funded by the local community), which opened on 29 October 1940. It closed permanently in 1967. It was on the western side of Grantleigh Pheasant Creek Road (23.81876°S 150.06903°E).

== Demographics ==
In the 2016 census, Pheasant Creek had a population of 48 people.

In the 2021 census, Pheasant Creek had a population of 48 people.

== Education ==
There are no schools in Pheasant Creek. The nearest government primary schools are Wowan State School in neighbouring Wowan to the south-east, Westwood State School in neighbouring Westwood to the north-east, and Gogango State School in neighbouring Gogango to the north-west. The nearest government secondary school is Mount Morgan State High School in Mount Morgan to the north-east. However, for students in some parts of Pheasant Creek, it would be too distant for a daily commute and the alternatives are distance education and boarding school.
