= Wura, Queensland =

Wura
- Suburb
- Interactive map of Wura
- Coordinates: 23.7908°S 150.3305°E
- Country: Australia
- State: Queensland
- LGA: Rockhampton Region
- Location: 19.2 km (11.9 mi) SW of Mount Morgan; 22.9 km (14.2 mi) NE of Wowan; 56.6 km (35.2 mi) SSW of Rockhampton; 668 km (415 mi) NNW of Brisbane

Government
  - State electorate: Mirani
  - Federal division: Flynn

Area
  - Total: 25.2 km^{2} (9.7 sq mi)

Population
  - Total: 0 (2021 census)
  - Density: 0.000/km^{2} (0.00/sq mi)
- Time zone: UTC+10:00 (AEST)
- Postcode: 4714
Suburbs around Wura
Westwood	Oakey Creek	Fletcher Creek
Westwood	Wura	Fletcher Creek
Dululu	Dululu	Ulogie

Wura is a rural locality in the Rockhampton Region, Queensland, Australia. In the 2021 census, Wura had "no people or a very low population".

== Geography ==
The locality is bounded to the east, south-east, and south by the Dee River.

The Burnett Highway enters the locality from the north (Oakey Creek) and exits to the south-west (Dululu).

== History ==
The locality takes its name from its former railway station, which is believed to be an Aboriginal word meaning kangaroo.

The Dawson Valley railway line from Mount Morgan to Wowan opened on 16 October 1912 with Wura being served by:

- Konara railway station (23.7681°S 150.3544°E)
- Gelobera railway station (23.80111°S 150.34500°E)
- Wura railway station (23.8135°S 150.3220°E)

This section of the line closed on 1 August 1987 and the station is now abandoned.

Konara State School opened in 1919. It closed in 1927. It was north of the Konara railway station, between the railway line and the Dee River, just south of the confluence with Fletcher Creek (approx 23.7633°S 150.36009°E), now in Oakey Creek.

Wura State School opened on 10 March 1924 and closed circa 1944. It was between the Wura railway station and the Dee River (approx 23.8160°S 150.3273°E).

== Demographics ==
In the 2016 census, Wura had a population of 15 people.

In the 2021 census, Wura had "no people or a very low population".

== Education ==
There are no schools in Wura. The nearest government primary schools are Mount Morgan Central State School in Mount Morgan to the north-east and Wowan State School in Wowan to the south-east. The nearest government secondary school is Mount Morgan State High School, also in Mount Morgan.
