= Goovigen =

- Town
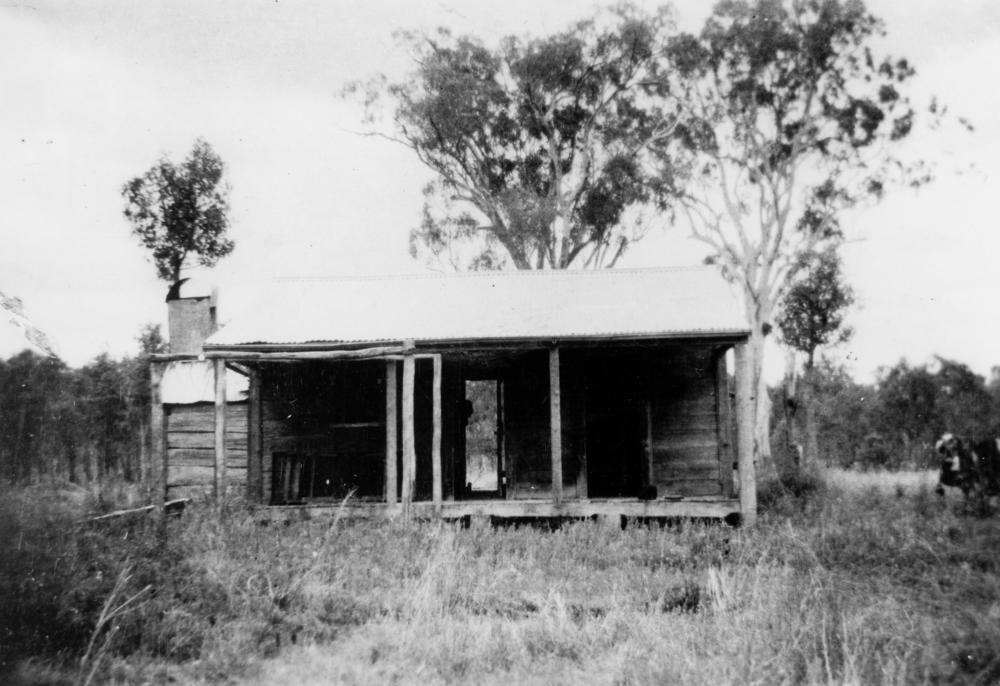
- Slab hut in Goovigen, 1930

- Interactive map of Goovigen
- Coordinates: 24.1466°S 150.2861°E
- Country: Australia
- State: Queensland
- LGA: Shire of Banana
- Location: 45.9 km (28.5 mi) NNW of Biloela; 81.8 km (50.8 mi) SSW of Mount Morgan; 119 km (74 mi) SSW of Rockhampton; 607 km (377 mi) NNW of Brisbane

Government
  - State electorate: Callide
  - Federal division: Flynn

Area
  - Total: 564.2 km^{2} (217.8 sq mi)

Population
  - Total: 349 (2021 census)
  - Density: 0.6186/km^{2} (1.6021/sq mi)
- Time zone: UTC+10:00 (AEST)
- Postcode: 4702
Localities around Goovigen
Wowan	Dixalea	Ulogie
Dumpy Creek	Goovigen	Jambin
Kokotungo	Woolein	Greycliffe

Goovigen is a rural town and locality in the Shire of Banana, Queensland, Australia. In the 2021 census, the locality of Goovigen had a population of 349 people.

A second town, Rannes (24.0986°S 150.12°E), is also within the locality of Goovigen, near its western boundary.

Koorngoo is a neighbourhood (24.1666°S 150.3166°E) within the locality, just west of centre, based around a former railway station.

== Geography ==
The town is towards the south-east of the locality, approximately 660 kilometres (410 mi) north west of the state capital, Brisbane.

The Burnett Highway enters the locality from the north (Dixalea) and exits to the east (Jambin) without coming close to either of the two towns. The Leichhardt Highway enters the locality from the south-west (Kokotunga / Woolein) and then. forms the south-west boundary of the locality and passes immediately west of the town of Rannes before exiting to the west (Dumpy Creek).

The now-closed Callide Valley railway line ran through the locality which was served by a number of now-abandoned railway stations:

- Rannes railway station, serving the town of Rannes (24.1035°S 150.1182°E)
- Jooro railway station (24.1145°S 150.2115°E)
- Goovigen railway station, serving the town of Goovigen (24.1464°S 150.2840°E)
- Koorngoo railway station (24.1716°S 150.3243°E)

== History ==
Goovigen was originally established as a supply depot for the railways and was named by the Queensland Railways Department on 27 April 1920. Goovigen is a local Aboriginal word for box tree, a species of Eucalyptus.

Koorngoo was originally a railway station name and is an Aboriginal word meaning food or feed bag.

Rannes State School opened on 14 March 1916. It closed on 23 February 1960 but reopened on 30 January 1962. It closed permanently on 18 March 1966.

Woolein State School opened on 27 February 1918 and closed on 17 August 1924.

Lake Pleasant State School opened on 23 February 1925. It closed on 17 March 1940, but reopened on 19 August 1940. It closed permanently on 1 May 1964. It was at 470 Lake Pleasant Road north of the town of Goovigen (24.09850°S 150.30060°E).

Goovigen State School opened on 15 March 1926.

Goovigen Post Office opened on 1 July 1927 (a receiving office had been open from 1925).

The Goovigen School of Arts opened on 1 June 1929. It is no longer in use but the building still stands at 9 Goovigen Rannes Road (24.1439°S 150.2866°E).

The Goovigen branch of the Queensland Country Women's Association was established on Saturday 10 September 1932 with nine local women signing up with President Mrs L Nielson (President), Vice-president Mrs T McNae (vice-president) and Secretary-Treasurer Miss Margery Adams. The Goovigen QCWA Younger Set was established in July 1934. In 1956 the branch purchased the building at 5 Stanley Street (24.1462°S 150.2864°E) for its rooms which, after refurbishment were officially opened on 26 January 1957 by Rockhampton City Mayor Rex Pilbeam. Over the years there were some closures of the branch: from 1941 to June 1949 due to World War II and then from 1960 to September 1974. The branch closed in April 2017.

On Sunday 7 April 1935, St Brigid's Catholic Church was officially opened and blessed by the Bishop of Rockhampton Romuald Denis Hayes. It was designed by R Chipps and built from timber at a cost of £612. As at 2022, the church is closed and is managed by the Goovigen Historical Society. It is at 7 Goovigen Rannes Road (24.1442°S 150.2866°E).

Jooro State School opened on 15 April 1935 and closed on 31 December 1963. It was on a 5-acre (2.0 ha) site on the east of Claire Lane (24.1105°S 150.1888°E).

St John the Baptist Anglican Church was built from timber in 1955.

The mobile library service commenced in 2004.

== Demographics ==
In the 2006 census, the locality of Goovigen and the surrounding area had a population of 287 people.

In the 2016 census, the locality of Goovigen had a population of 215 people.

In the 2021 census, the locality of Goovigen had a population of 349 people.

== Economy ==
The town supports the surrounding agricultural district which produces cotton, cattle and grain.

There are a number of homesteads in the locality, including:

- Netley (24.1360°S 150.3250°E)
- Smoky Creek (24.1316°S 150.3699°E)
- Tomlin (24.0604°S 150.3639°E)
- Wyalga Downs (24.0880°S 150.2325°E)

== Education ==
Goovigen State School is a government primary (Prep-6) school for boys and girls at Rannes Road (24.1432°S 150.2864°E). In 2016, the school had an enrolment of 8 students. In 2018, the school had an enrolment of 6 students with 2 teachers (1 full-time equivalent) and 5 non-teaching staff (2 full-time equivalent).

There are no secondary schools in Goovigen. The nearest government secondary schools are Biloela State High School in Biloela to the south-east and Mount Morgan State High School in Mount Morgan to the north.

== Facilities ==
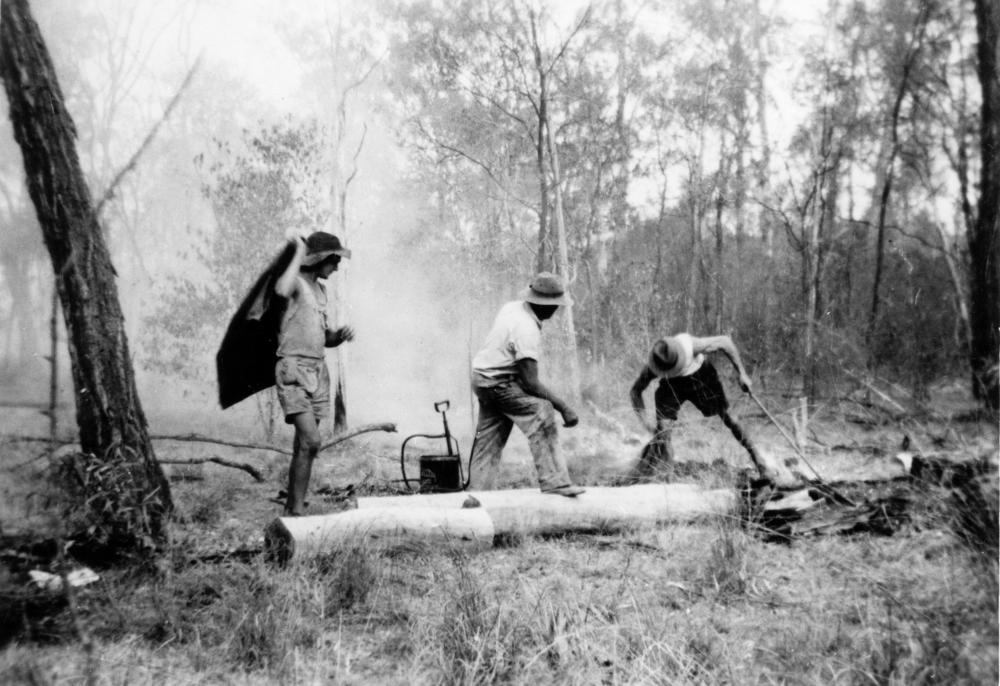
Firefighting in the Goovigen district, 1952

Goovigen Police Station is at 5 Stone Crescent (24.1460°S 150.2861°E).

Goovigen Rural Fire Station is at 11 Stone Crescent (24.1461°S 150.2847°E).

Goovigen Post Office is part of the Goovigen Hotel Motel at 2 Stanley Street (24.1468°S 150.2862°E).

Goovigen Cemetery is to the north-east of the town on the north-west corner of Goovigen Connection Road and Lake Pleasant Road (24.1371°S 150.3102°E).

== Amenities ==
Banana Shire Council operate a fortnightly mobile library service to Goovigen and the school.

Goovigen Community Hall is at 9 Stone Crescent (24.1461°S 150.2855°E). The Goovigen Roll of Honour commemorating those who served in World War II is within the hall.

St John the Baptist Anglican Church is at 30 Warren Street (24.1473°S 150.2844°E). It is part of the Anglican Parish of Callide Valley.

The Goovigen War Memorial commemorates military service in all conflicts. It is located in Nissen Park on the southern corner of Warren Street and Prospect Creek Goovigen Road (24.1475°S 150.2856°E).
