= Greycliffe, Queensland =

Greycliffe
- Suburb
- Interactive map of Greycliffe
- Coordinates: 24.23°S 150.2961°E
- Country: Australia
- State: Queensland
- LGA: Shire of Banana
- Location: 49.1 km (30.5 mi) NE of Banana; 41.1 km (25.5 mi) NW of Biloela; 139 km (86 mi) WSW of Gladstone; 599 km (372 mi) NNW of Brisbane

Government
  - State electorate: Callide
  - Federal division: Flynn

Area
  - Total: 112.6 km^{2} (43.5 sq mi)

Population
  - Total: 56 (2021 census)
  - Density: 0.497/km^{2} (1.288/sq mi)
- Time zone: UTC+10:00 (AEST)
- Postcode: 4715
Suburbs around Greycliffe
Goovigen	Goovigen	Goovigen
Woolein	Greycliffe	Jambin
Woolein	Orange Creek	Orange Creek

Greycliffe is a rural locality in the Shire of Banana, Queensland, Australia. In the 2021 census, Greycliffe had a population of 56 people.

== Geography ==
The terrain is mountainous in the centre and west of the locality, up to 310 metres (1,020 ft) above sea level. It is part of the Banana Range. This area is within the Overdeen State Forest. The eastern edge of the locality is lower, down to 140 metres (460 ft) above sea level. This eastern land is predominantly used for grazing on native vegetation with some cropping.

== History ==
Greycliffe State School opened on 11 November 1935. It closed on 17 December 1993. It was on the corner of Belldeen Greycliffe Road and Prospect Creek Goovigen Road (24.2661°S 150.3562°E), now over the boundary into Orange Creek.

== Demographics ==
In the 2016 census, Greycliffe had a population of 22 people.

In the 2021 census, Greycliffe had a population of 56 people.

== Education ==
There are no schools in Greycliffe. The nearest government primary schools are Goovigen State School in neighbouring Goovigen to the north, Jambin State School in neighbouring Jambin to the east, Prospect Creek State School in Prospect to the south-east and Banana State School in Banana to the south-west. The nearest government secondary school is Biloela State High School in Biloela to the south-east.
