= Fletcher Creek, Queensland =

Fletcher Creek
- Suburb
- Interactive map of Fletcher Creek
- Coordinates: 23.7927°S 150.4175°E
- Country: Australia
- State: Queensland
- LGA: Rockhampton Region
- Location: 19.4 km (12.1 mi) S of Mount Morgan; 56.8 km (35.3 mi) SSW of Rockhampton; 676 km (420 mi) NNW of Brisbane

Government
  - State electorate: Mirani
  - Federal division: Flynn

Area
  - Total: 132.0 km^{2} (51.0 sq mi)

Population
  - Total: 0 (2021 census)
  - Density: 0.000/km^{2} (0.000/sq mi)
- Time zone: UTC+10:00 (AEST)
- Postcode: 4714
Suburbs around Fletcher Creek
Oakey Creek; Walmul	Nine Mile Creek	Bajool
Wura	Fletcher Creek	Bajool
Ulogie	Ulogie	Ulogie

Fletcher Creek is a rural locality in the Rockhampton Region, Queensland, Australia. In the 2021 census, Fletcher Creek had "no people or a very low population".

== Geography ==
The Dee River forms most of the western boundary.

The Burnett Highway runs past to the west.

The locality has the following mountains (from west to east):

- Piebald Mountain (23.8167°S 150.3477°E) 367 metres (1,204 ft)
- Sugarloaf Mountain (23.7892°S 150.3634°E) 327 metres (1,073 ft)
- Sentry Mountain (23.8157°S 150.3739°E)
- Mount Hope (23.8178°S 150.4052°E) 458 metres (1,503 ft)

Gelobera State Forest is in the north-east of the locality and Mount Hopeful Conservation Park is in the south of the locality. Apart from these protected areas, the land use is predominantly grazing on native vegetation with a small amount of crop growing near the Dee River in the west of the locality.

== Demographics ==
In the 2016 census, Fletcher Creek had "no people or a very low population".

In the 2021 census, Fletcher Creek had "no people or a very low population".

== Education ==
There are no schools in the locality. The nearest government primary school is Mount Morgan Central State School in Mount Morgan to the north. The nearest government secondary school is Mount Morgan State High School, also in Mount Morgan.
