= Dululu =

- Town
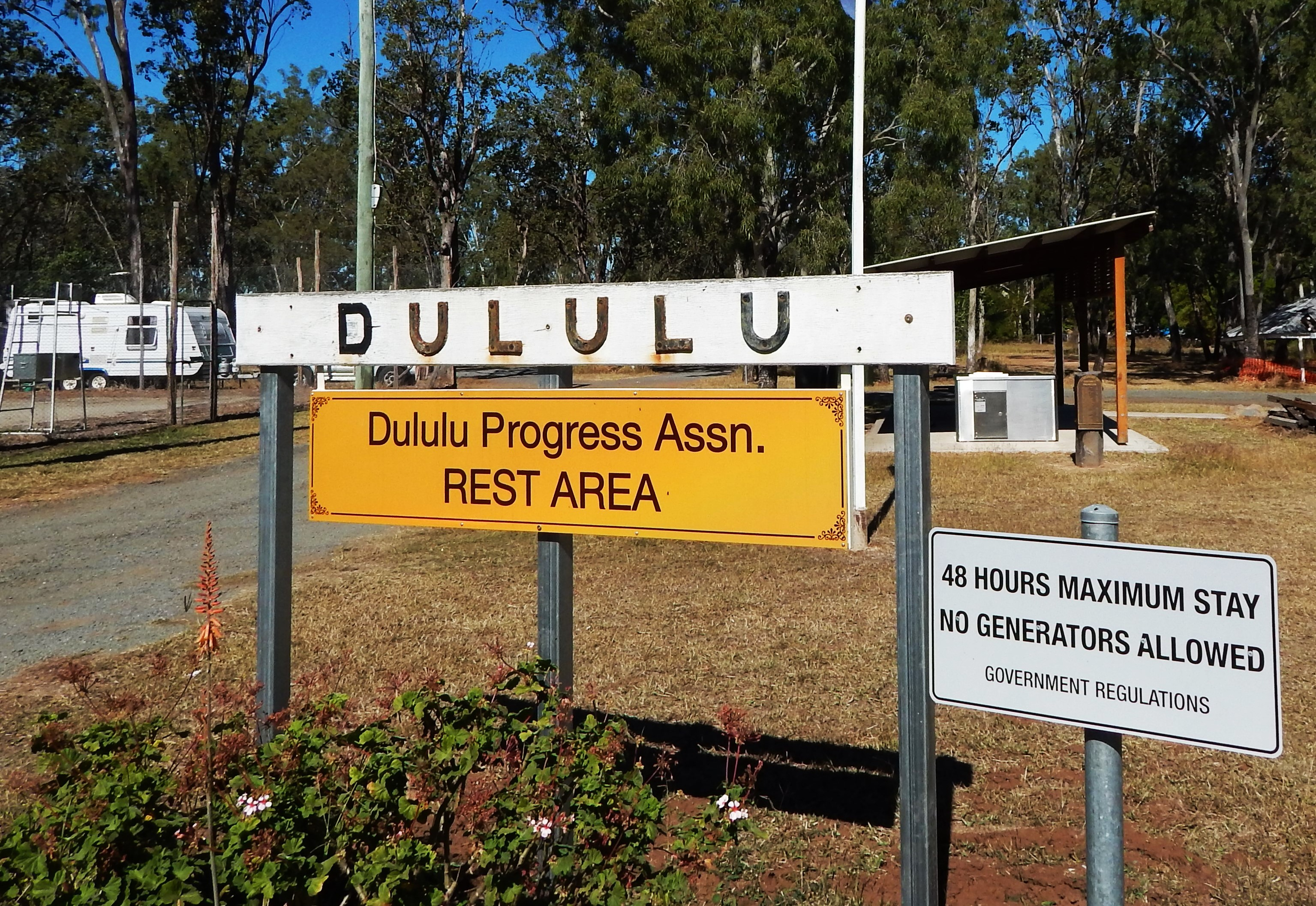
- Dululu Rest Area, 2014

- Interactive map of Dululu
- Coordinates: 23.8458°S 150.2619°E
- Country: Australia
- State: Queensland
- LGA: Shire of Banana
- Location: 32.3 km (20.1 mi) SW of Mount Morgan; 69.9 km (43.4 mi) SW of Rockhampton; 74.1 km (46.0 mi) NNW of Biloela; 642 km (399 mi) NNW of Brisbane

Government
  - State electorate: Callide
  - Federal division: Flynn

Area
  - Total: 146.6 km^{2} (56.6 sq mi)

Population
  - Total: 97 (2021 census)
  - Density: 0.662/km^{2} (1.714/sq mi)
- Time zone: UTC+10:00 (AEST)
- Postcode: 4702
Localities around Dululu
Pheasant Creek	Westwood	Wura
Wowan	Dululu	Ulogie
Wowan	Dixalea	Dixalea

Dululu is a rural town and locality in the Shire of Banana, Queensland, Australia. In the 2021 census, the locality of Dululu had a population of 97 people.

== Geography ==
Dululu is in Central Queensland and sits at the junction of the Burnett and Leichhardt highways, 70 kilometres (43 mi) south-west of Rockhampton, Queensland and 610 kilometres (380 mi) north-west of Brisbane.

There are a number of neighbourhoods in Dululu:

- Boogargan (23.8166°S 150.3166°E)
- Bunerba (23.8833°S 150.3°E)
- Littles Crossing (23.8666°S 150.2166°E)

The now-closed Dawson Valley railway line passed through the locality with two abandoned stations in the locality:

- Boogargan railway station (23.8123°S 150.3083°E)
- Dululu railway station serving the town (23.8455°S 150.2612°E)

== History ==
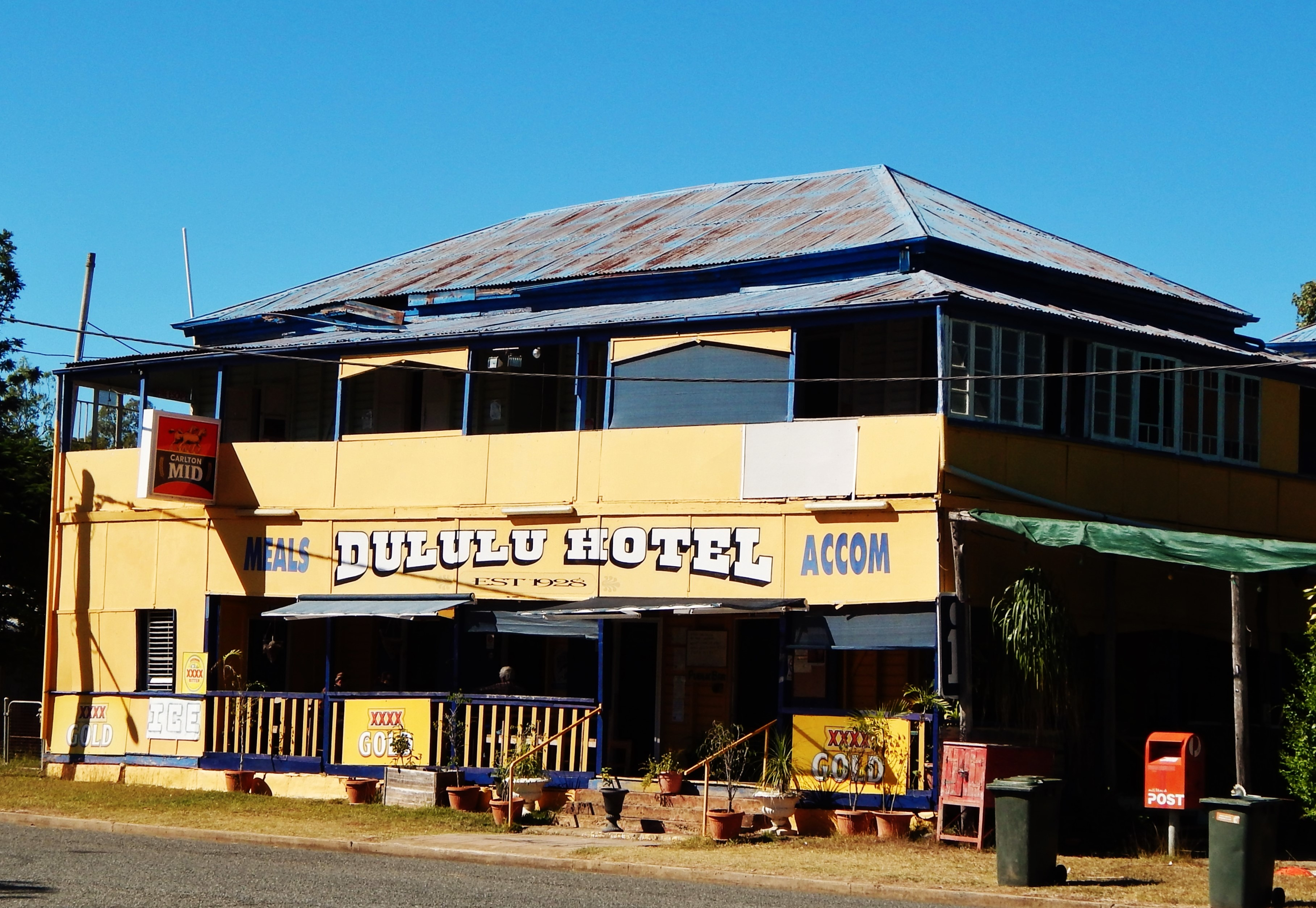
Dululu Hotel, 2014

The town's original name was Bunerba, but on 29 April 1915 Queensland Railways Department decided to name the new railway station Dululu to avoid confusion with Buneru, another town located near Wowan. The name derives from an Indigenous word meaning "soft".

Alma Creek State School opened in 1915 and closed in 1935.

Dululu State School opened circa August 1916 and closed on 11 April 1968. It was at 30 Bryant Street (23.8496°S 150.2612°E).

Dululu Post Office opened by 1920 (a receiving office had been open from 1915).

Bunerba Provisional School opened in February 1922. On 1 August 1924, it became Bunerba State School. It closed on 13 December 1996. It was at 88 Bunerba School Road (23.8748°S 150.2979°E).

== Demographics ==
In the 2011 census, the locality of Dululu and the surrounding area had a population of 139 people.

In the 2016 census, the locality of Dululu had a population of 126 people.

In the 2021 census, the locality of Dululu had a population of 97 people.

== Education ==
There are no schools in Dululu. The nearest government primary school is Wowan State School in neighbouring Wowan to the south-west. The nearest government secondary school is Mount Morgan State High School in Mount Morgan to the north-east.

== Amenities ==
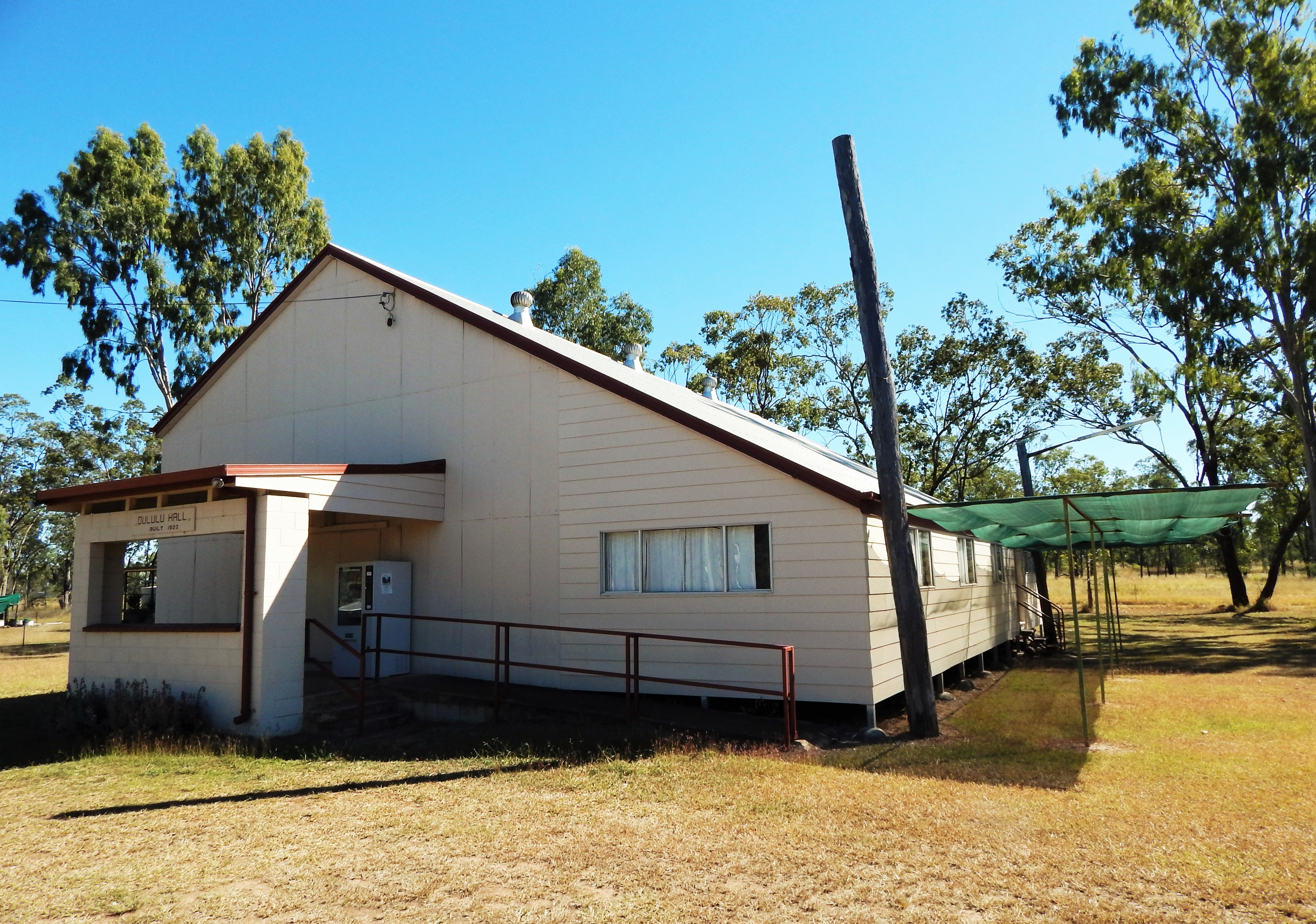
Dululu Hall, 2014

Dululu Hall is at 14 Bryant Street (23.8477°S 150.2615°E).
