= Orange Creek, Queensland =

Orange Creek
- Suburb
- Interactive map of Orange Creek
- Coordinates: 24.3322°S 150.3488°E
- Country: Australia
- State: Queensland
- LGA: Shire of Banana
- Location: 20.3 km (12.6 mi) NW of Biloela; 128 km (80 mi) SW of Gladstone; 134 km (83 mi) SSW of Rockhampton; 601 km (373 mi) NNW of Brisbane

Government
  - State electorate: Callide
  - Federal division: Flynn

Area
  - Total: 294.7 km^{2} (113.8 sq mi)

Population
  - Total: 197 (2021 census)
  - Density: 0.6685/km^{2} (1.731/sq mi)
- Time zone: UTC+10:00 (AEST)
- Postcode: 4715
Suburbs around Orange Creek
Woolein	Greycliffe	Jambin
Banana	Orange Creek	Callide
Banana	Prospect	Dakenba

Orange Creek is a rural locality in the Shire of Banana, Queensland, Australia. In the 2021 census, Orange Creek had a population of 197 people.

== Geography ==
The locality is bounded to the east by the Burnett Highway and to the south-west by the Dawson Highway.

The Moura railway line enters the locality from the north-east (Jambin) and exits to the south-east (Banana). There are no railway stations on the line within the locality.

The land use is a mixture of grazing on native vegetation and crop growing.

The locality presumably takes its name from the watercourse Orange Creek which flows through the locality.

== History ==
Coreen State School opened on 23 August 1933 and closed in 1951. It was on Prospect Creek Goovigen Road (approx 24.3319°S 150.4009°E). It takes its name from the local parish name.

Greycliffe State School opened on 11 November 1935. It closed on 17 December 1993. It was on the corner of Belldeen Greycliffe Road and Prospect Creek Goovigen Road (24.2661°S 150.3562°E), now within Orange Creek.

== Demographics ==
In the 2016 census, Orange Creek had a population of 212 people.

In the 2021 census, Orange Creek had a population of 197 people.

== Education ==
There are no schools in Orange Creek. The nearest government primary schools are Prospect Creek State School in neighbouring Prospect to the south, Biloela State School in Biloela to the south-east, and Jambin State School in neighbouring Jambin to the north-east. The nearest government secondary school is Biloela State High School in Biloela.
