= Banana, Queensland =

Banana
- Town
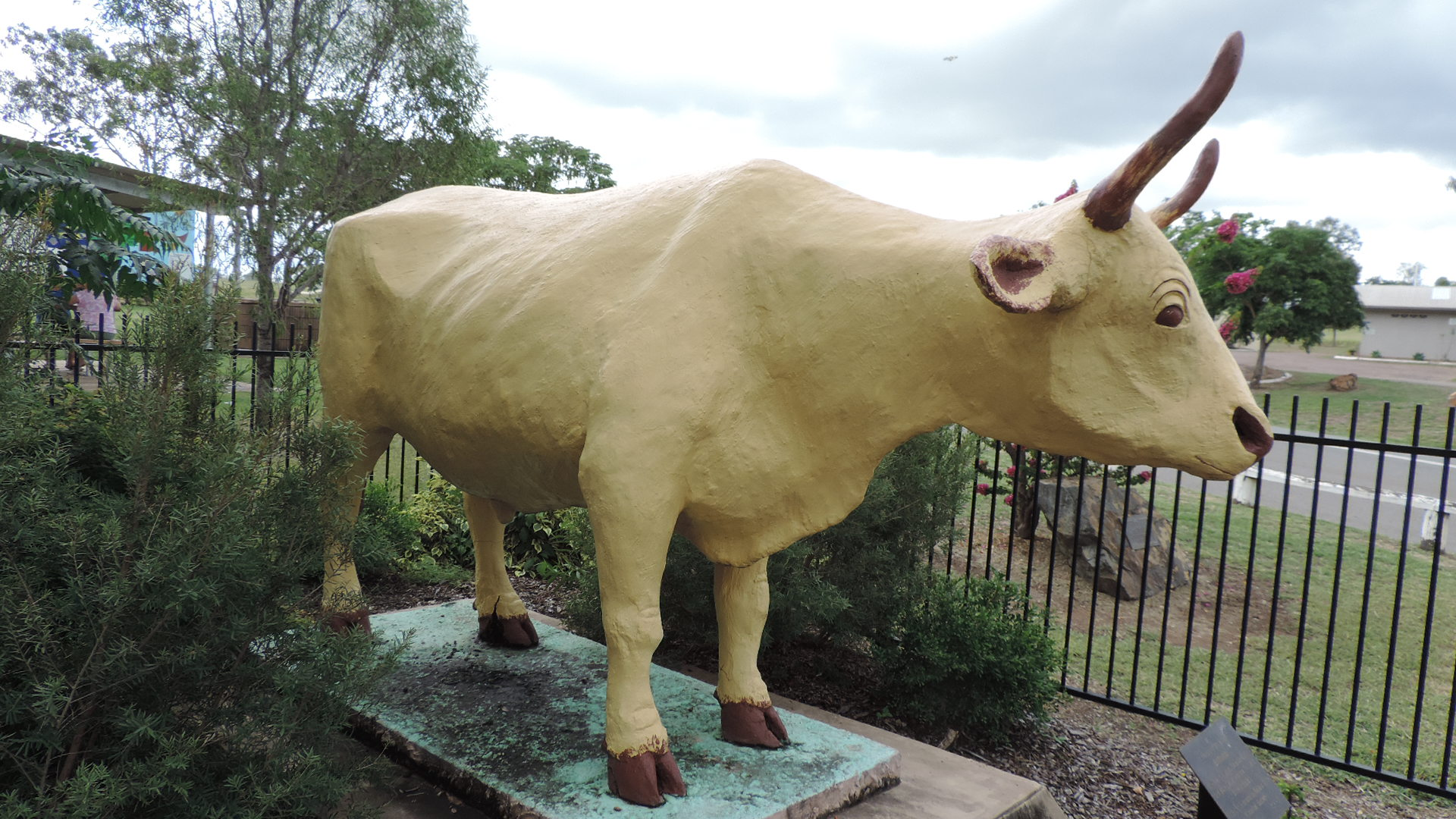
- Statue of the bullock "Banana", 2014

- Interactive map of Banana
- Coordinates: 24.4722°S 150.1283°E
- Country: Australia
- State: Queensland
- LGA: Shire of Banana
- Location: 46.2 km (28.7 mi) W of Biloela; 149 km (93 mi) SW of Rockhampton; 167 km (104 mi) SW of Gladstone; 603 km (375 mi) NW of Brisbane

Government
  - State electorate: Callide
  - Federal division: Flynn

Area
  - Total: 939.9 km^{2} (362.9 sq mi)

Population
  - Total: 348 (2021 census)
  - Density: 0.3703/km^{2} (0.9589/sq mi)
- Time zone: UTC+10:00 (AEST)
- Postcode: 4702
Localities around Banana
Kokotungo	Woolein	Orange Creek
Baralaba; Moura	Banana	Prospect; Tarramba
Kianga	Lonesome Creek	Castle Creek

Banana is a rural town and locality in the Shire of Banana, Queensland, Australia. In the 2021 census, the locality of Banana had a population of 348 people.

== Geography ==
Banana is located at the intersection of the Dawson and Leichhardt highways, 46 kilometres (29 mi) west of the shire's administrative centre, Biloela.

== History ==
Gangalu (Gangulu, Kangulu, Kanolu, Kaangooloo, Khangulu) is an Australian Aboriginal language spoken on Gangula country. The Gangula language region includes the towns of Clermont and Springsure extending south towards the Dawson River.

In 1853, James, Norman and Charles Leith-Hay established the Rannes pastoral lease and Banana was an outstation of this property. Banana became its own squatting leasehold sheep station property in 1855 with the Leith-Hays and Thomas Holt holding the licence. In 1855 a group of Aboriginal people attacked Banana Station wounding five people and stealing 3,000 sheep. In April 1858, a number of Aboriginal people in an unprovoked attack, murdered 4 men at Camboon and had stolen a carbine, gunpowder and balls, and some axes. They then proceeded to attack the sheep station at Banana resulting in three shepherds being wounded. While the shepherds were defending themselves, an Aboriginal man was killed. Native Police troopers were deployed to patrol the area and a 1859 map shows a police station marked on the planned site for Banana.

The name Banana derives from an old dun-coloured working bullock, called Banana, used by local stockmen to help them when herding some of the wilder cattle into the yards.

The post office at Banana was established on 1 September 1861, and the first township allotments were offered for sale in that same year.

In 1887, there was a minor gold rush at Banana, increasing the population by a few hundred people.

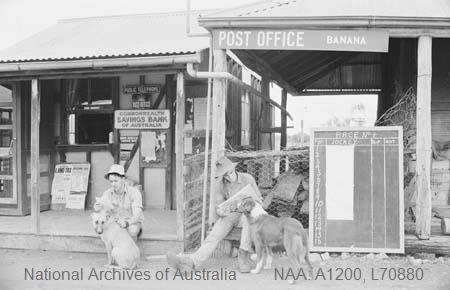
Two men and their dogs outside the Commonwealth Bank and the Post Office, Banana, Queensland, 1968

Banana Provisional School opened on 18 September 1871 and was upgraded to Banana State School on 16 February 1874. The school closed in 1935, but reopened on 25 January 1960.

In 1880, the local government area Banana Division (later the Shire of Banana) was established with its headquarters in Banana (taking its name from the town). However, in 1930 the shire headquarters became Rannes and the shire offices were physically relocated from Banana to Rannes. Since 1946, the shire has its headquarters in Biloela.

The mobile library service commenced in 2004.

== Demographics ==
In the 2006 census, the locality of Banana had a population of 627 people.

In the 2011 census, the locality of Banana had a population of 377 people.

In the 2016 census, the locality of Banana had a population of 356 people.

In the 2021 census, the locality of Banana had a population of 348 people.

== Economy ==
The beef industry is still a mainstay of the town and area, along with coal and agriculture.

== Education ==
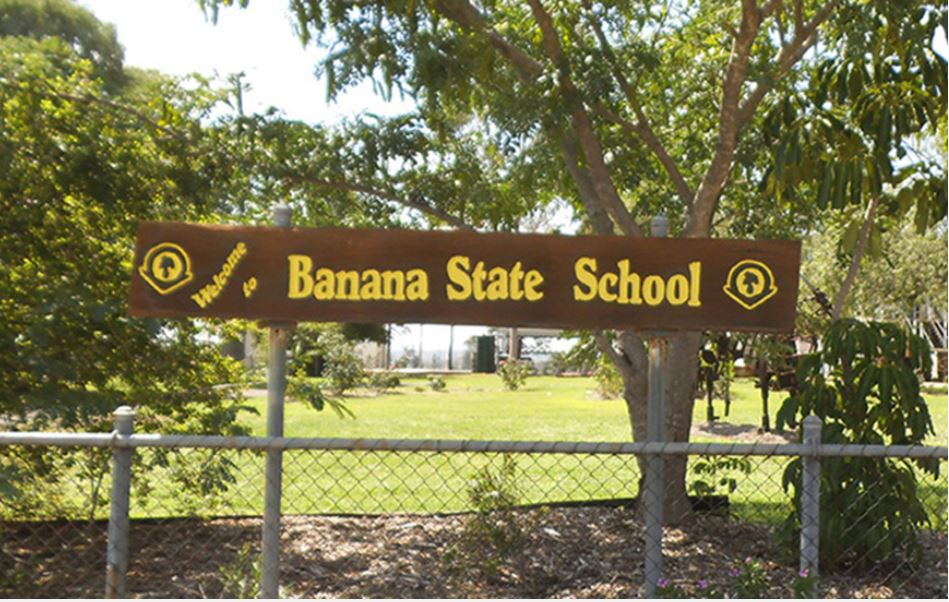
Banana State School, 2022

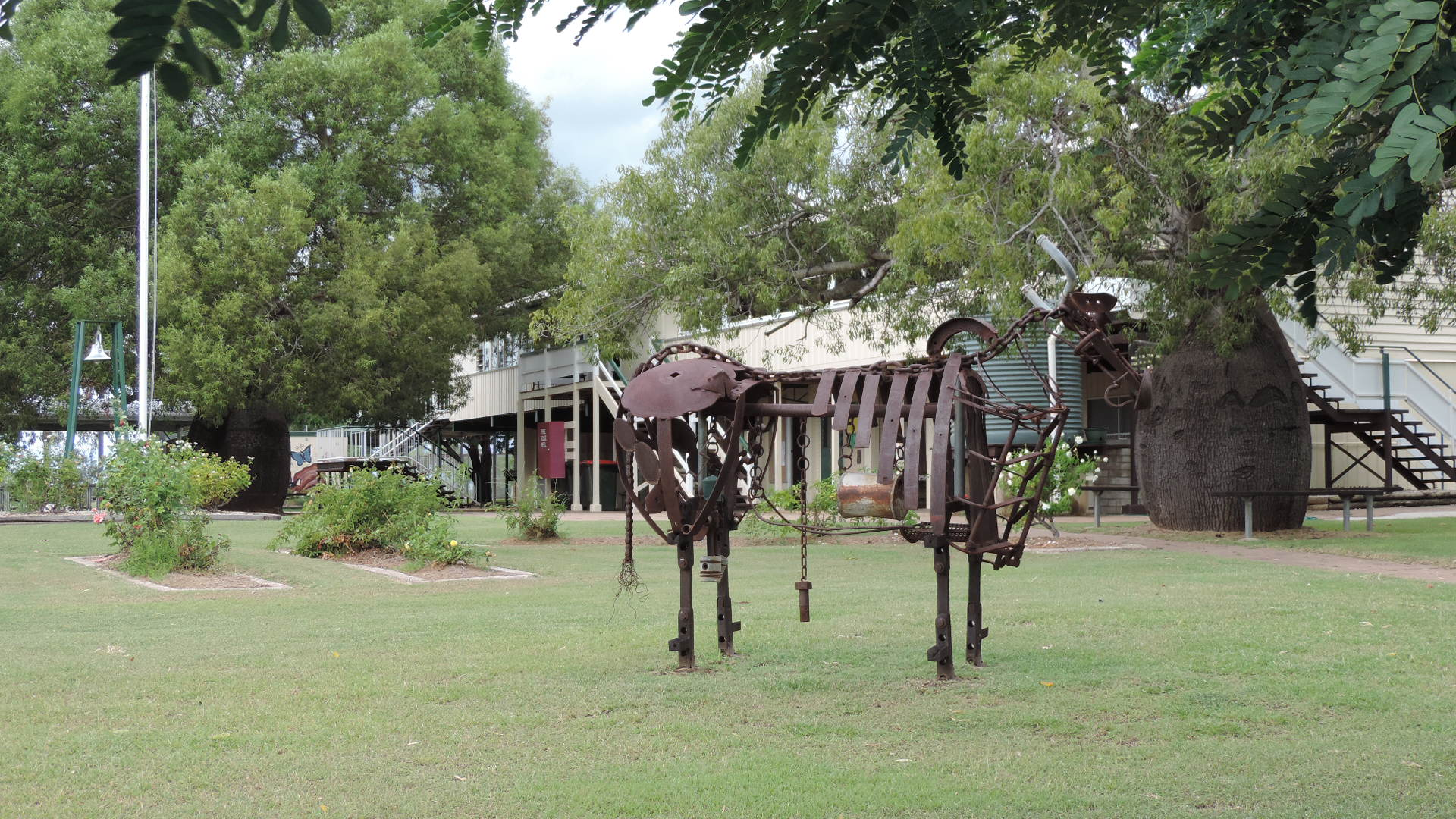
Bull statue, Banana State School, 2014

Banana State School is a government primary (P–6) school for boys and girls at 32–36 Bramston Street (24.469134°S 150.131069°E). In 2012, there were 37 students enrolled with 3 teachers (2.5 full-time equivalent).

There are no secondary schools in Banana; the nearest government secondary schools are Moura State High School in neighbouring Moura to the west and Biloela State High School in Biloela to the east.

== Amenities ==
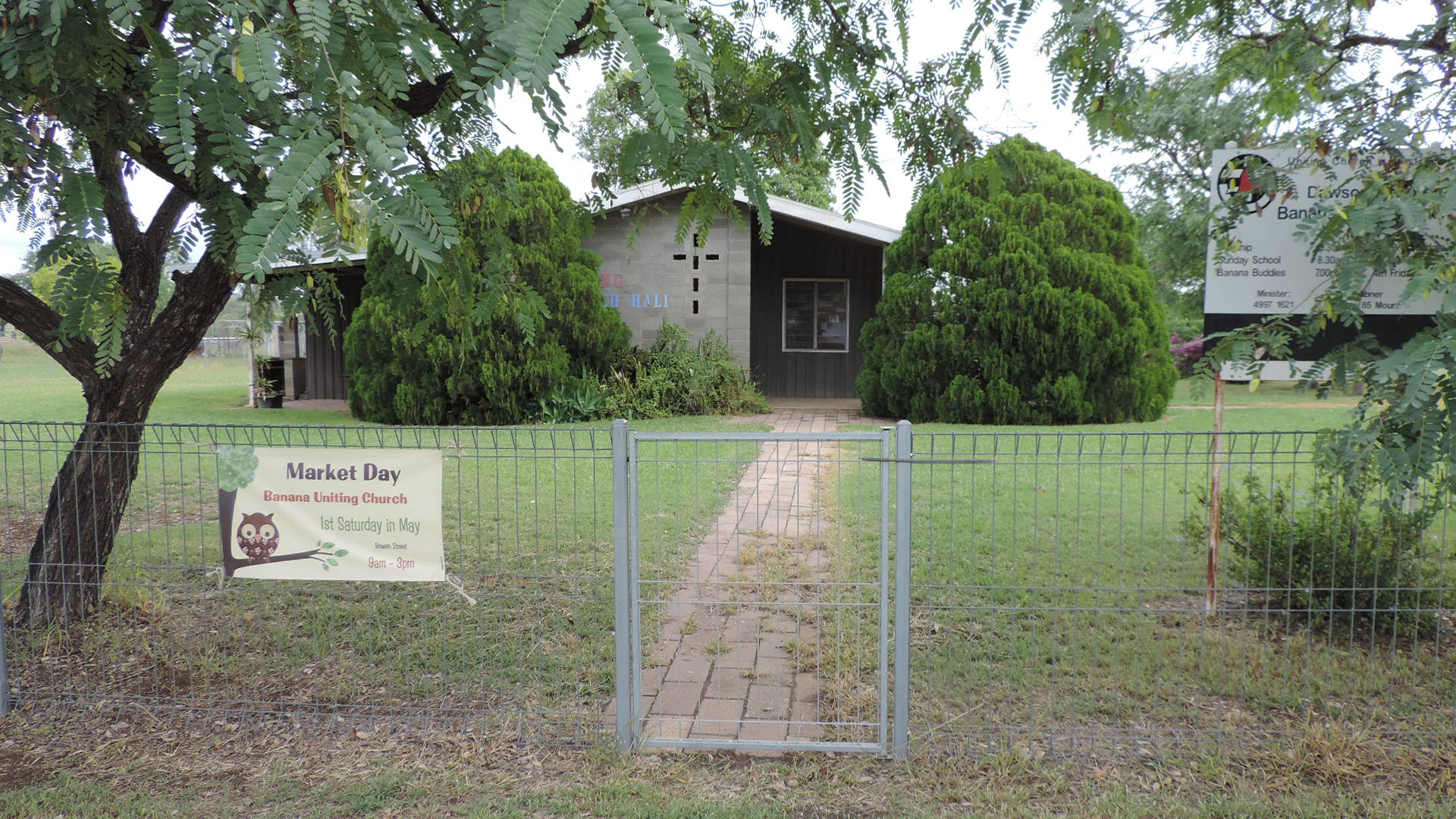
Banana Uniting Church, 2014

Banana has a Uniting Church at 39 Bowen Street (Leichhardt Highway) at the corner with North Street (24.46875°S 150.12821°E).

Banana Shire Council operate a fortnightly mobile library service to Banana and the school.

The Banana branch of the Queensland Country Women's Association meets at 123 Bramston Street.
