= Wowan, Queensland =

Wowan
- Town
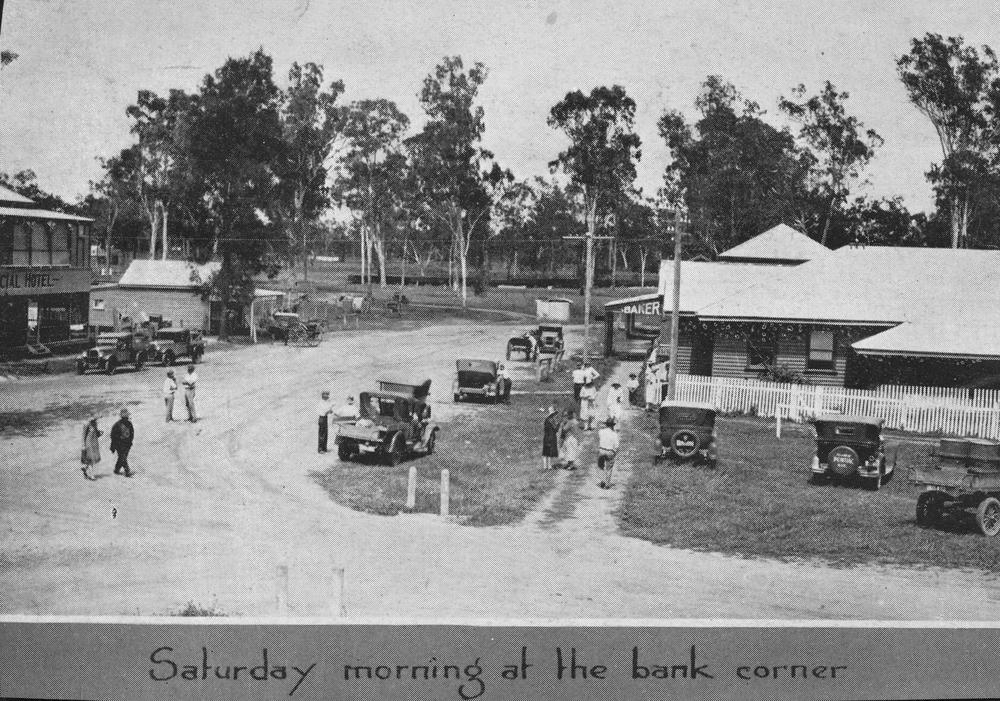
- Streetscape, Wowan, 1931

- Interactive map of Wowan
- Coordinates: 23.9069°S 150.1955°E
- Country: Australia
- State: Queensland
- LGA: Shire of Banana
- Location: 72.4 km (45.0 mi) NNW of Biloela; 79.8 km (49.6 mi) SW of Rockhampton; 641 km (398 mi) NW of Brisbane

Government
  - State electorate: Callide
  - Federal division: Flynn

Area
  - Total: 232.3 km^{2} (89.7 sq mi)

Population
  - Total: 170 (2021 census)
  - Density: 0.732/km^{2} (1.90/sq mi)
- Time zone: UTC+10:00 (AEST)
- Postcode: 4702
Localities around Wowan
Pheasant Creek	Pheasant Creek	Dululu
Dumpy Creek	Wowan	Dixalea
Dumpy Creek	Goovigen	Goovigen

Wowan is a rural town and locality in the Shire of Banana, Queensland, Australia. In the 2021 census, the locality of Wowan had a population of 170 people.

The town of Deeford is also within the locality.

== Geography ==
The Dee River forms part of the eastern boundary.

Both towns are located in the north-east of the locality with Deeford at 23.9175°S 150.2258°E near a crossing point of the Dee River. There are also a number of neighbourhoods within the location:

- Buneru (23.95°S 150.1666°E)
- Cooneel (23.9833°S 150.1666°E)
- Muruguran (24.0166°S 150.15°E)

The Leichhardt Highway runs through from north to south through the localityl, passing through the town of Wowan.

== History ==
Wowan takes its name from the Wowan railway station, which in turn was named from the Aboriginal word for Australian brush-turkey. Deeford was originally known as Dundee, but was renamed Deeford on 6 November 1913 by the Queensland Surveyor-General.

Dundee Provisional School opened on 1 June 1900. It closed in 1904 but reopened in 1905. On 1 January 1909 it became Dundee State School. It closed in 1911.

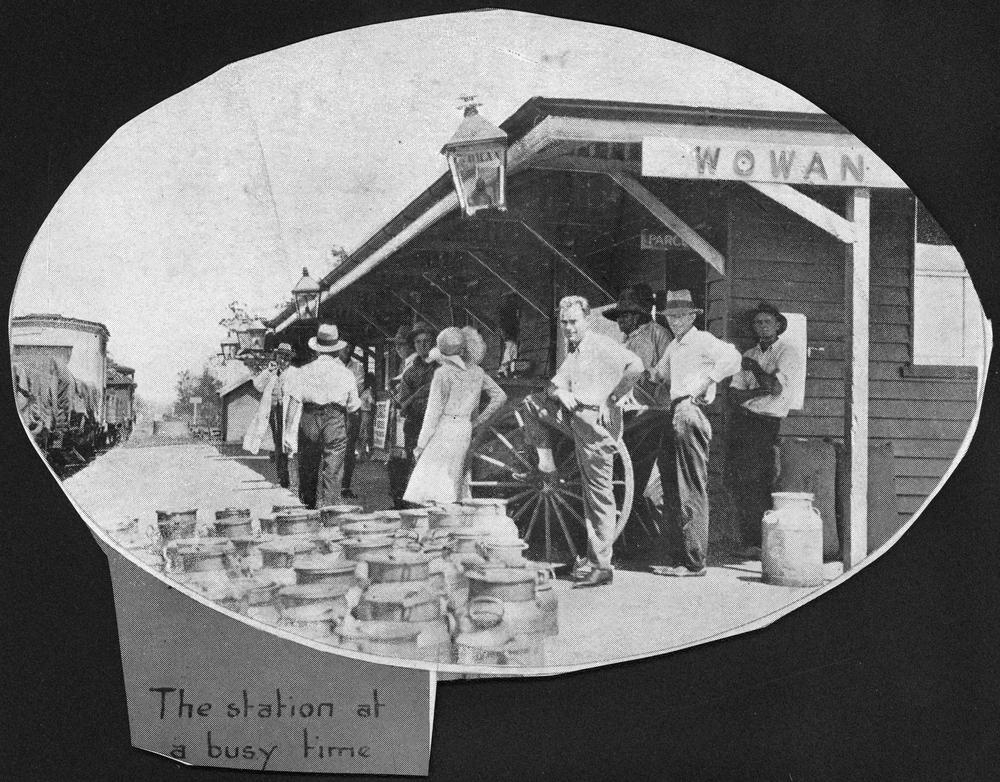
Wowan railway station, 1931

The Dawson Valley railway line was built from 1910 and by 1912 its first stage of construction had reached the area, terminating at the Wowan railway station (23.9057°S 150.1980°E) on 16 October 1912.

In 1912, two schools opened. One was Dundee Camp Provisional School (in the area that became the town of Wowan), presumably to provide education to the children of the railway workers living in the camp during the construction of the railway. The other was Dundee State School (in what is now Deeford). In 1915 Dundee Camp Provisional School was renamed Wowan Provisional School and on 1 May 1916 became Wowan State School. In 1917 Dundee State School was renamed Deeford State School. Deeford State School closed in 1941.

Wowan was settled in 1912. The butter factory opened on 1 April 1919; it was operated by the Dawson Valley Co-operative Company.

The second stage of the Dawson Valley railway line opened on 2 February 1915 and extended the line from the town of Wowan via other stations within the locality:

- Buneru railway station (23.9563°S 150.1733°E)
- Cooneel railway station (23.9787°S 150.1603°E)
- Muruguran railway station (24.0204°S 150.1450°E)

and then onto Rannes.

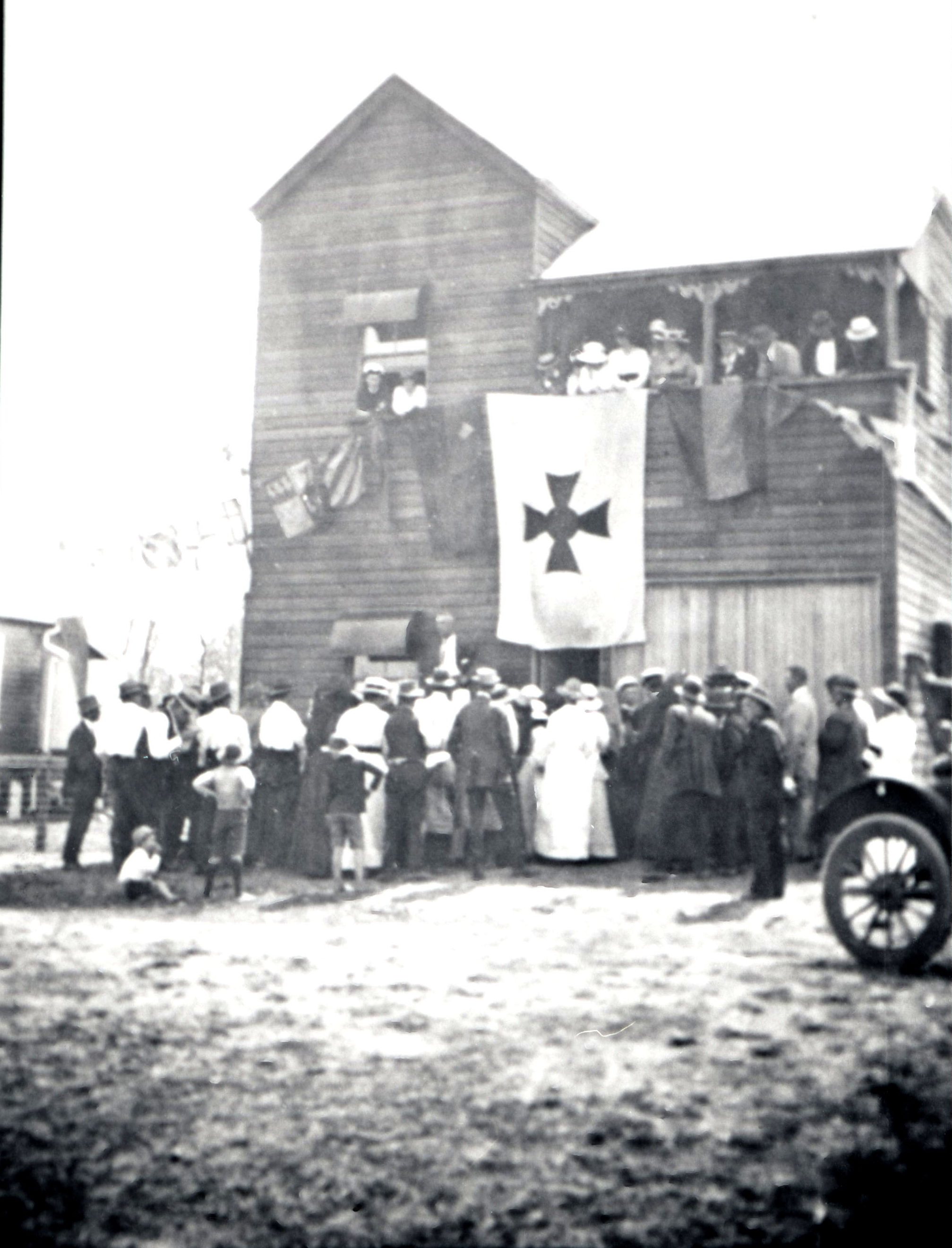
Queensland Ambulance Transport Brigade building, Wowan, circa 1925

An ambulance was based at Wowan from November 1917, initially operating from a temporary shed. A permanent ambulance station was opened in October 1918.

Buneru State School opened on 5 October 1918 on the south-western corner of Portion 100 on the (now) Leichhardt Highway (23.96828°S 150.16419°E). Following flooding in 1928, the decision was made to relocate and enlarge the school. In 1934, the school was relocated to the south-west corner of Buneru Road and Buneru School Road (23.9576°S 150.1492°E). The school closed in 1962.

Wowan Methodist Church was the first church built in the district at 13 Caroline Street (23.9109°S 150.1968°E). A stump-capping ceremony was held on 20 October 1923 and the church and opened on 13 January 1924. Following the amalgamation of the Methodist Church into the Uniting Church in Australia in 1977, it became Wowan Uniting Church. The church building was damaged in the 2012 floods. The community decided to relocate it to the Wowan Museum and refurbish the building. The Wowan Uniting Church amalgamated with the Biloela Uniting Church to form the Callide Valley Uniting Church which holds its Wowan services in All Souls Anglican Church.

On 1 August 1987, the railway line from Kabra to Wowan was closed.

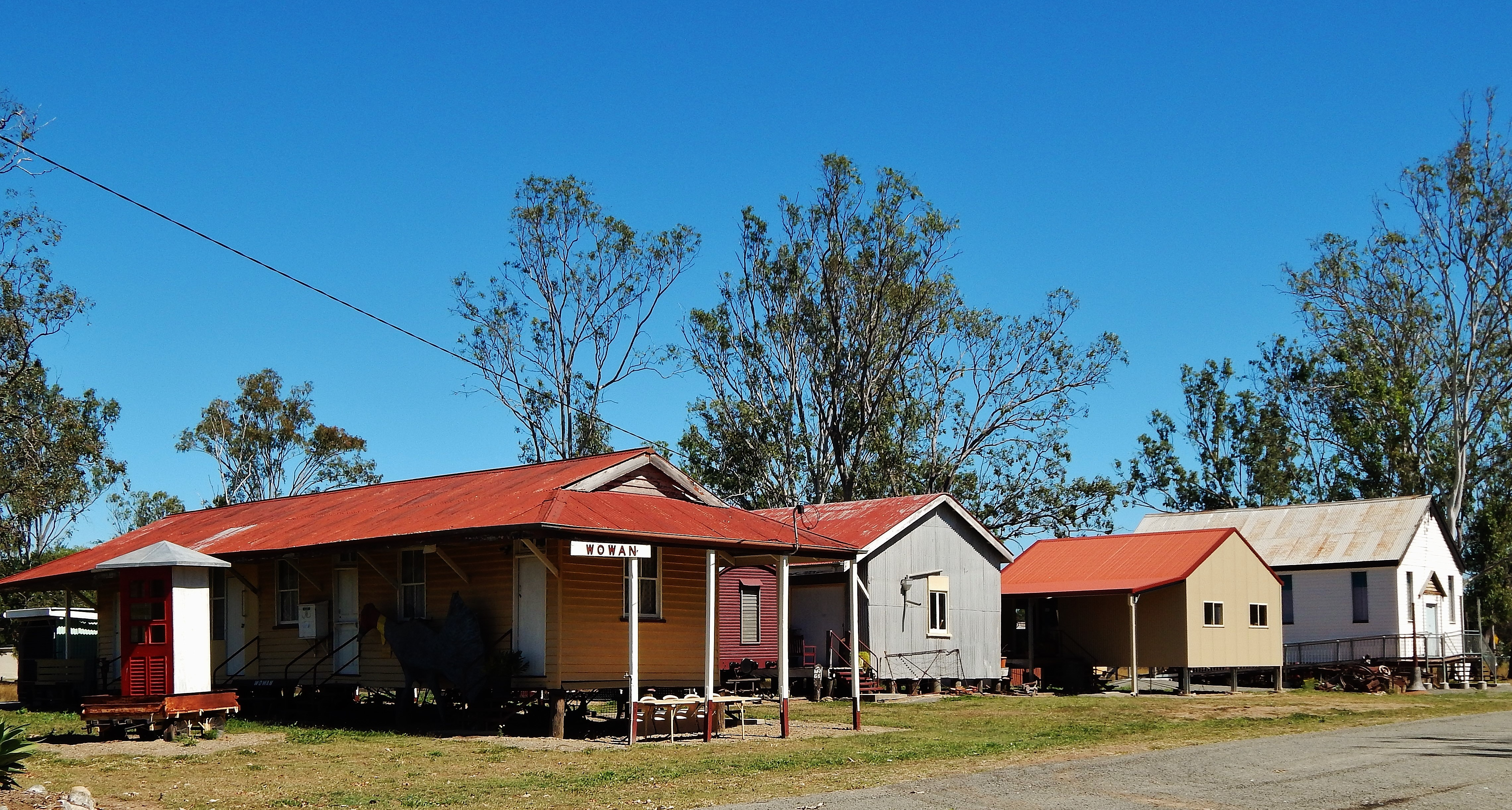
Buildings at Wowan Museum, 2017

The Wowan Museum was originally established in the former butter factory after the site was transformed into a caravan park in the 1980s. After the museum outgrew the butter factory, it was relocated to the former railway station and the new Wowan Museum was officially opened by Deputy Premier Jeff Seeney on 13 October 2012, as part of the community celebrations commemorating the 100th anniversary of the railway being opened in 1912.

== Demographics ==
In the 2006 census, the locality of Wowan and the surrounding area had a population of 338.

In the 2016 census, the locality of Wowan had a population of 216 people.

In the 2021 census, the locality of Wowan had a population of 170 people.

== Economy ==
Farm produce from the area includes beef, hay, grain, pork and eggs.

== Education ==
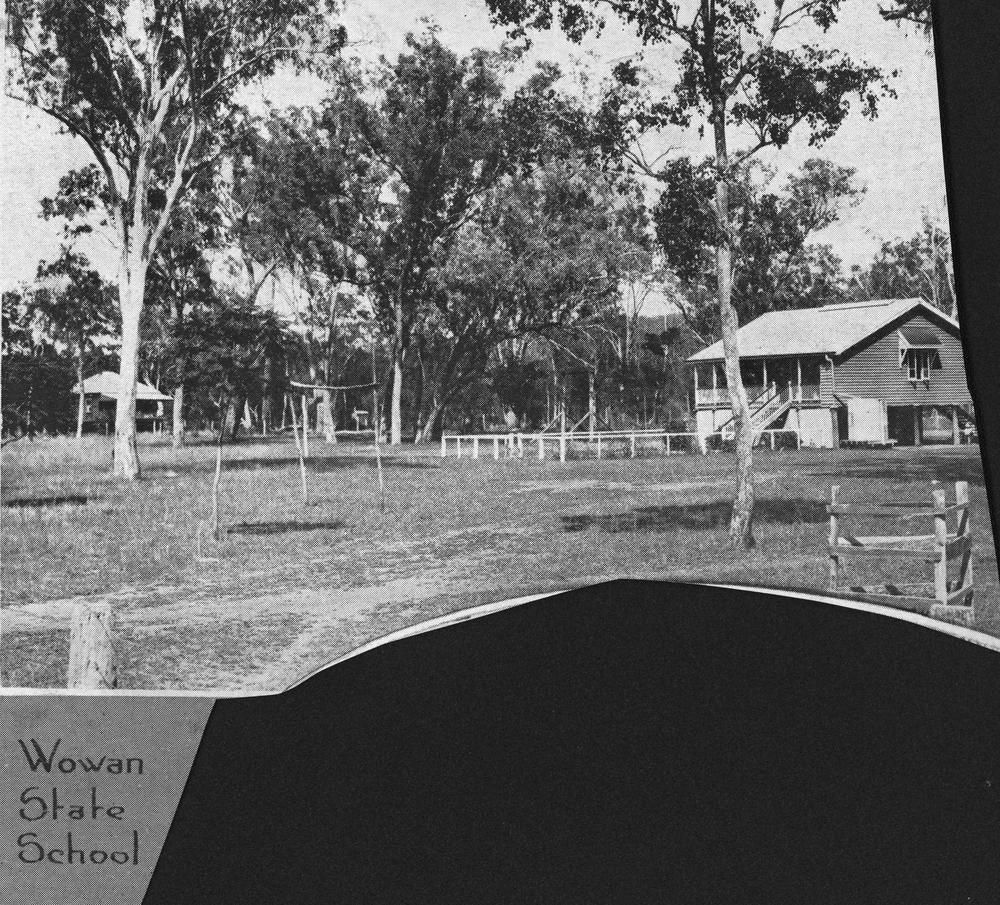
Wowan State School, 1931

Wowan State School is a government primary (Prep–6) school for boys and girls on Don Street (23.9104°S 150.1938°E). In 2017, the school had an enrolment of 33 students with 4 teachers (3 full-time equivalent) and 5 non-teaching staff (3 full-time equivalent). In 2018, the school had an enrolment of 30 students with 4 teachers (3 full-time equivalent) and 4 non-teaching staff (2 full-time equivalent).

There are no secondary schools in Wowan. The nearest government secondary school is Baralaba State School (to Year 10) in Baralaba to the south-west. For secondary education to Year 12, the nearest government secondary school is Mount Morgan State High School in Mount Morgan to the north-east.

== Amenities ==
The Callide Valley Uniting Church meets at All Souls Anglican Church at 19 Don Street (23.9058°S 150.1954°E).

== Attractions ==
The Wowan and District Museum is in the old butter factory and former railway station at 2A Dee River Road (corner of Leichhardt Highway, 23.9099°S 150.1958°E).

== Events ==
Wowan holds its annual agricultural show in August.
