= Don River (Central Queensland) =

Don
- Location of Don River mouth in Queensland

Location
- Country: Australia
- Region: Central Queensland

Physical characteristics
- Source: Great Dividing Range
  - location: below Black Mountain
  - coordinates: 23°59′02″S 150°40′52″E
  - elevation: 246 m (807 ft)
- Mouth: confluence with the Dawson River
  - location: north of Baralaba
  - coordinates: 23°57′13″S 149°51′11″E
  - elevation: 71 m (233 ft)
- Length: 165 km (103 mi)

Basin features
- River system: Fitzroy River basin

The Don River is a river in Central Queensland, Australia.

Located within the Fitzroy River basin, the Don River rises in the Don River State Forest below Black Mountain and flows generally west, then southwest, than west, joined by twelve tributaries. The river reaches its confluence with the Dawson River north of Baralaba. The Don River descends 175 metres (574 ft) over its 165-kilometre (103 mi) course. From source to mouth, the river is crossed by the Burnett Highway and the Leichhardt Highway.

== See also ==
- List of rivers of Australia § Queensland
