= Baralaba, Queensland =

Baralaba
- Town
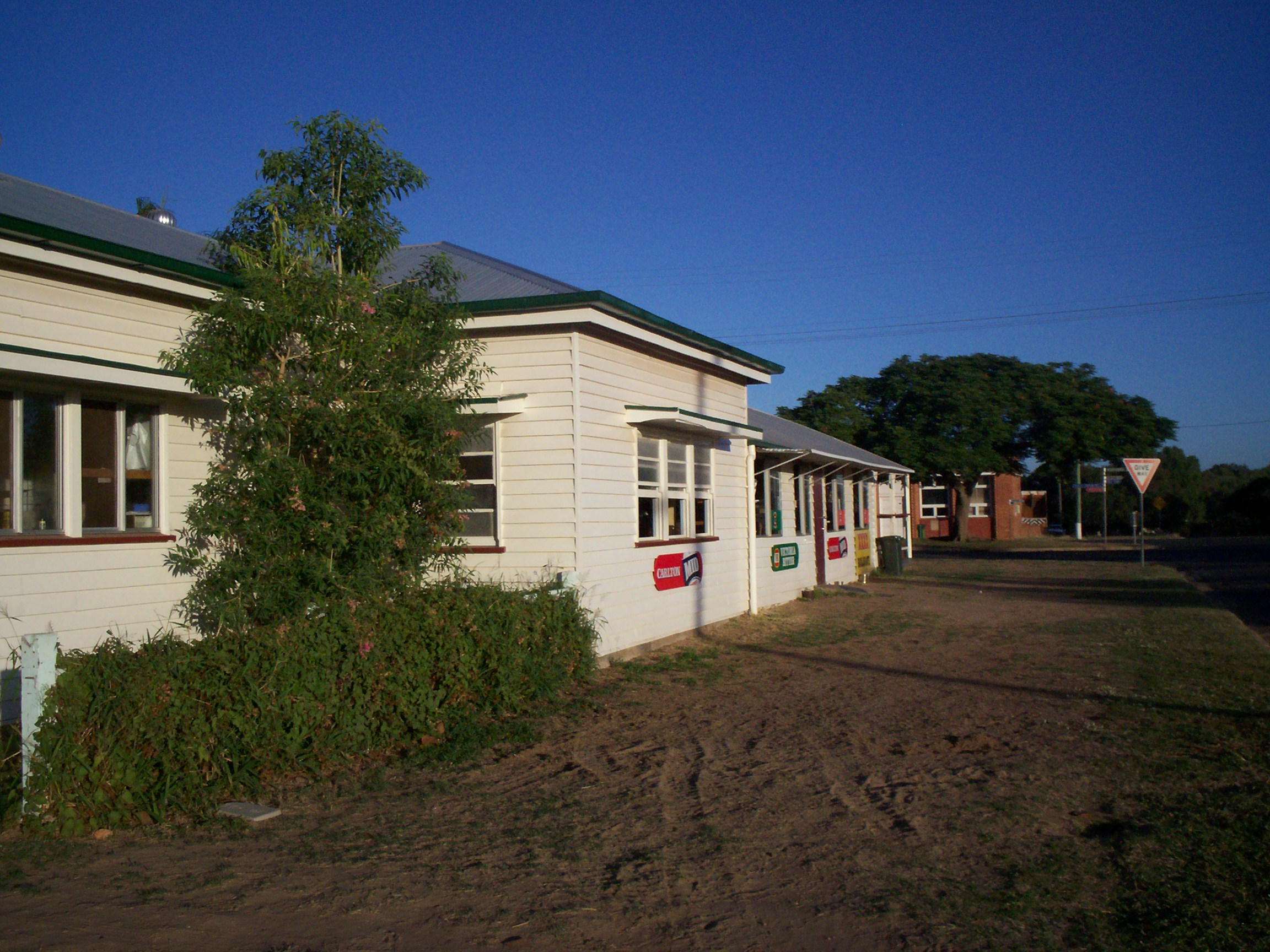
- The Baralaba Hotel

- Interactive map of Baralaba
- Coordinates: 24.1819°S 149.8133°E
- Country: Australia
- State: Queensland
- LGA: Shire of Banana
- Location: 95 km (59 mi) NW of Biloela; 141 km (88 mi) SW of Rockhampton; 667 km (414 mi) NW of Brisbane

Government
  - State electorate: Callide
  - Federal division: Flynn

Area
  - Total: 373.6 km^{2} (144.2 sq mi)

Population
  - Total: 324 (2021 census)
  - Density: 0.8672/km^{2} (2.246/sq mi)
- Time zone: UTC+10:00 (AEST)
- Postcode: 4702
Localities around Baralaba
Alberta	Kokotungo	Kokotungo
Alberta	Baralaba	Banana
Alberta	Moura	Banana

Baralaba is a rural town and locality in the Shire of Banana in central Queensland, Australia. In the 2021 census, the locality of Baralaba had a population of 324 people.

== Geography ==
The Dawson River forms the western boundary of the locality. The town is located in the north-west corner of the locality beside the river. The Neville Hewitt weir on the river at the town creates a wide river for irrigation and recreation.

The town is located 33 kilometres (21 mi) west of the Leichhardt Highway.

== History ==
The town's name is derived from an Aboriginal word meaning "high mountain" referring to nearby Mount Ramsay.

Baralaba Provisional School opened on 19 August 1918. It became a state school on 1 March 1922. In 1964, a secondary department was added.

Baralaba Post Office opened by April 1924 (a receiving office had been open since about 1919).

Lily State School opened in 1925 and closed circa 1927.

Mclellan’s Hotel opened on 3 April 1929, being renamed Stewart's Hotel on 11 February 1953. On 2 December 1965, it was renamed Baralaba Hotel. It was destroyed by fire on 24 August 2024.

St Patrick's Roman Catholic Church was designed by Roy Chipps of Rockhampton. The timber church was built by R. L. Schofeld at a cost of £650. On Sunday 24 February 1935, the church was opened and consecrated by Bishop Hayes.

In May 1941, an Honour Board commemorating those who served in World War II was unveiled at the Returned and Services League of Australia Memorial Hall in Stopford Street (24.181750°S 149.811143°E). Outside of the Memorial Hall is a white cross commemorating those who served in all wars and conflicts.

In September 1945, a Methodist Ladies' Guild was established to raise funds for a Methodist church. In November 1945, two blocks of land were donated for the church. The land for Baralaba Methodist Church was consecrated in August 1948. In 1977, the Baralaba Methodist Church became Baralaba Uniting Church when the Methodist Church amalgamated into the Uniting Church in Australia.

Two coal mines once operated in the Baralaba region. Both closed, but mining operations recommenced at one mine in 2005.

The mobile library service commenced in 2004.

== Demographics ==
In the 2006 census, the town of Baralaba had a population of 290 people.

In the 2011 census, the locality of Baralaba had a population of 479 people.

In the 2016 census, the locality of Baralaba had a population of 314 people.

In the 2021 census, the locality of Baralaba had a population of 324 people.

== Heritage listings ==
Baralaba has a number of heritage-listed sites, including:

- Dawson Valley Colliery, Morgan Street and The Esplanade (24.1759°S 149.811°E)

== Economy ==
The local economy revolves around beef production and more recently coal mining.

== Education ==
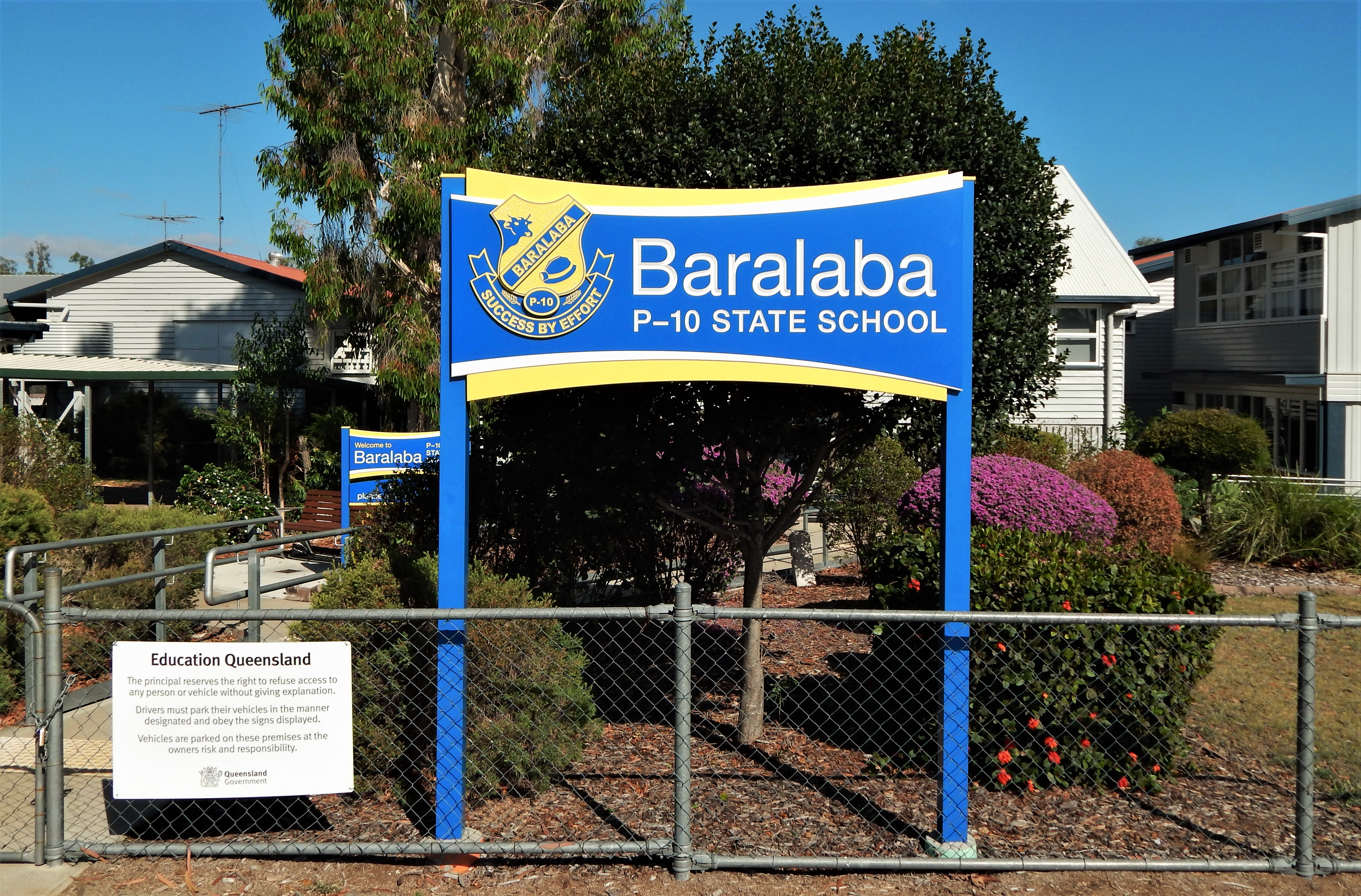
Baralaba P-10 State School, 2019

Baralaba State School is a government primary and secondary (Prep–10) school for boys and girls at 1 Power Street (24.1810°S 149.8097°E). In 2017, the school had an enrolment of 90 students with 12 teachers (9 full-time equivalent) and 15 non-teaching staff (9 full-time equivalent).

The nearest government secondary school offering Years 11 and 12 is Moura State High School in Moura to the south.

== Amenities ==
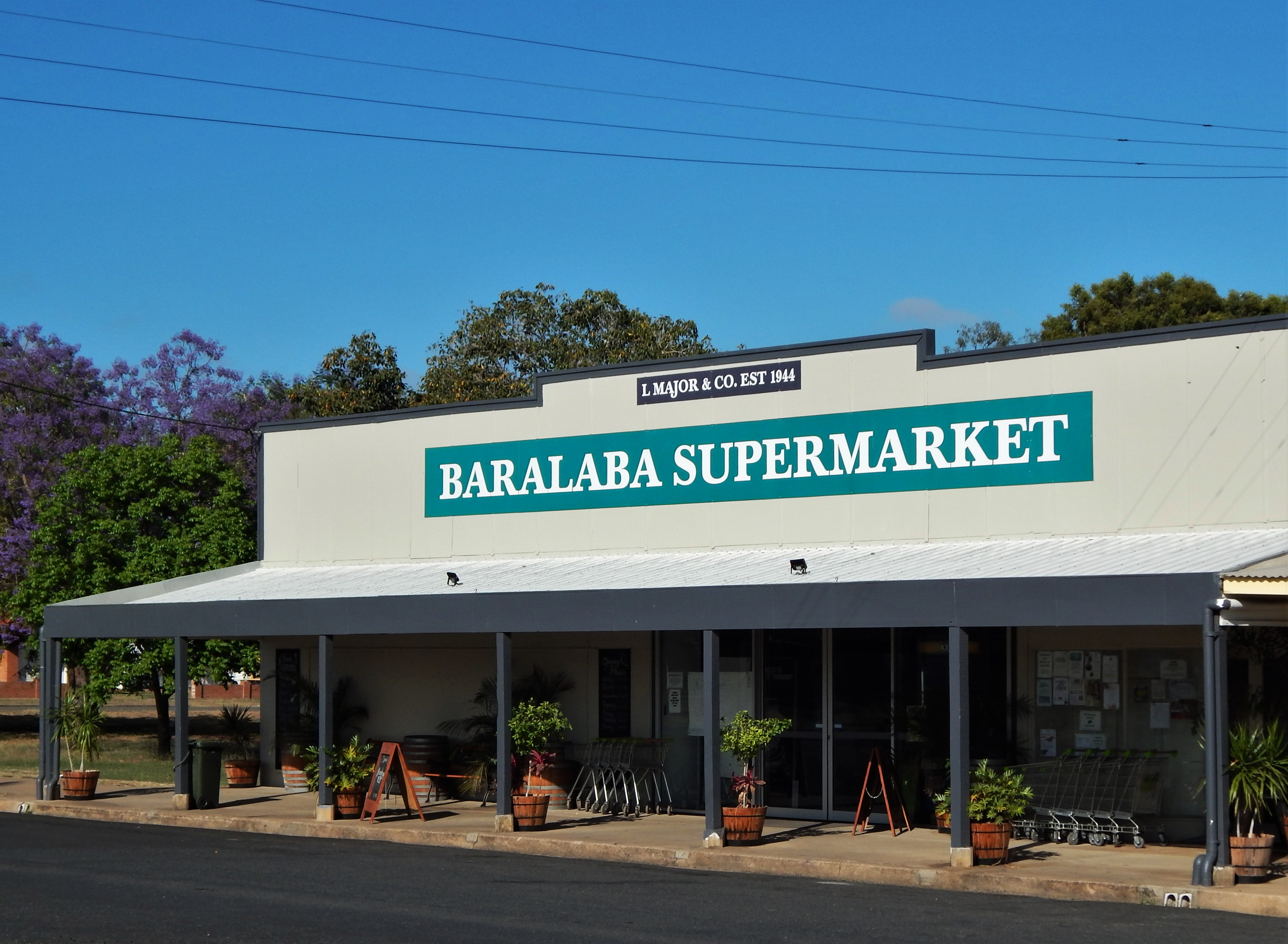
Baralaba Supermarket, 2019

Baralaba Golf Club has a 9-hole golf course and is located on Alberta Road.

Banana Shire Council operate a fortnightly mobile library service to Baralaba.

Baralaba Uniting Church is at 43 Power Street (24.1767°S 149.8118°E).

St Patrick's Roman Catholic Church is at 29 Power Street (24.177843°S 149.811°E).

== Events ==
Every March, there is a campdrafting competition at Baralaba.

The annual Baralaba agricultural show is held in May, while the Saratoga Fishing Competition is held each September.
