= Leichhardt Highway =

Highway in Queensland, Australia

Leichhardt Highway Queensland
- Leichhardt Highway (green on black)

General information
- Type: Highway
- Length: 611 km (380 mi)
- Route number(s): State Highway A5 Westwood – Goondiwindi North; State Highway A5 / State Route 85 / State Highway A39 Goondiwindi North – Goondiwindi
- Former route number: National Highway 39; National Route 39

Major junctions
- South end: Cunningham Highway (National Route 42)
- Barwon Highway (State Route 85); Gore Highway (State Highway A39 / State Route 85); Moonie Highway (State Route 49); Warrego Highway (National Highway A2); Dawson Highway (State Route 60); Burnett Highway (State Highway A3)
- North end: Capricorn Highway (A4), 7km south of Westwood, Queensland

Location(s)
- Major settlements: Moonie, Miles, Guluguba, Wandoan, Taroom, Theodore, Banana, Dululu

Highway system
- Highways in Australia; National Highway • Freeways in Australia; Highways in Queensland

The Leichhardt Highway is a major transport route in Queensland, Australia. It is a continuation northward from Goondiwindi of the Newell Highway, via a 2.0-kilometre (1.2 mi) section of the Cunningham Highway.

It runs northward from Goondiwindi for more than 600 kilometres until its termination at the Capricorn Highway near the small town of Westwood.

The highway is a state-controlled strategic road, except for the section concurrent with the Gore Highway, which is a state-controlled part of the National Network.

== History ==
It is named after Prussian explorer Ludwig Leichhardt who travelled a route in the 19th century that roughly parallels today's highway.

== Upgrade ==
A project to replace the Banana Creek bridge, at a cost of $7.7 million, was completed in April 2022.

== List of towns along the Leichhardt Highway ==
Travelling from south to north:

- Goondiwindi
- Moonie
- Condamine
- Miles
- Guluguba
- Wandoan
- Taroom
- Theodore
- Banana
- Dululu
- Westwood

== Major intersections ==
LGA	Location	km	mi	Destinations	Notes
Goondiwindi	Goondiwindi	0	0.0	Cunningham Highway (National Highway A15) – north, then east – Yelarbon: south – Queensland – NSW border	Southern end of Leichhardt Highway. Runs west (as Boundary Road) then north as State Highway A5. Southern concurrency terminus with Gore Highway.
Goondiwindi	Goondiwindi	4.0	2.5	Barwon Highway (State Route 85) – south, then north–west – Toobeah	Leichhardt Highway turns north
Goondiwindi	Goondiwindi	19.0	11.8	Gore Highway (State Highway A39) – north–east – Milmerran	Northern concurrency terminus with Gore Highway.
Western Downs	Moonie	97.3	60.5	Moonie Highway (State Route 49) – north–east — Dalby / south–west – St George	
Western Downs	The Gums	144	89	Surat Developmental Road (State Route 87) – east – Dalby / west – Surat	
Western Downs	Condamine	189	117	Condamine–Meandarra Road (State Route 74) – south–west – Meandarra	
Western Downs	Miles	225	140	Warrego Highway (State Highway A2) – east – Chinchilla / west – Roma	South eastern concurrency terminus with Warrego Highway
Western Downs	Miles	226	140	Warrego Highway (State Highway A2) – west – Roma	North western concurrency terminus with Warrego Highway
Banana	Taroom	372	231	Fitzroy Developmental Road (Taroom–Bauhinia Downs Road) (State Route 7) – north–west – Bauhinia	
Banana	Theodore	449	279	Eidsvold–Theodore Road (State Route 73) – south – Cracow	
Banana	Banana	506	314	Dawson Highway (State Route 60) – south–west – Moura / north – Banana CBD	Southern concurrency terminus with Dawson Highway
Banana	Banana	507	315	Dawson Highway (State Route 60) – north–east – Biloela	Northern concurrency terminus with Dawson Highway
Banana	Dululu	586	364	Burnett Highway (State Highway A3) – north–east – Mount Morgan / south–east – Jambin	
Banana	Westwood	611	380	Capricorn Highway (State Highway A4) – north–east – Rockhampton / south–west – Duaringa	Northern end of Leichhardt Highway
1.000 mi = 1.609 km; 1.000 km = 0.621 mi: Concurrency terminus; Route transition

== Gallery ==
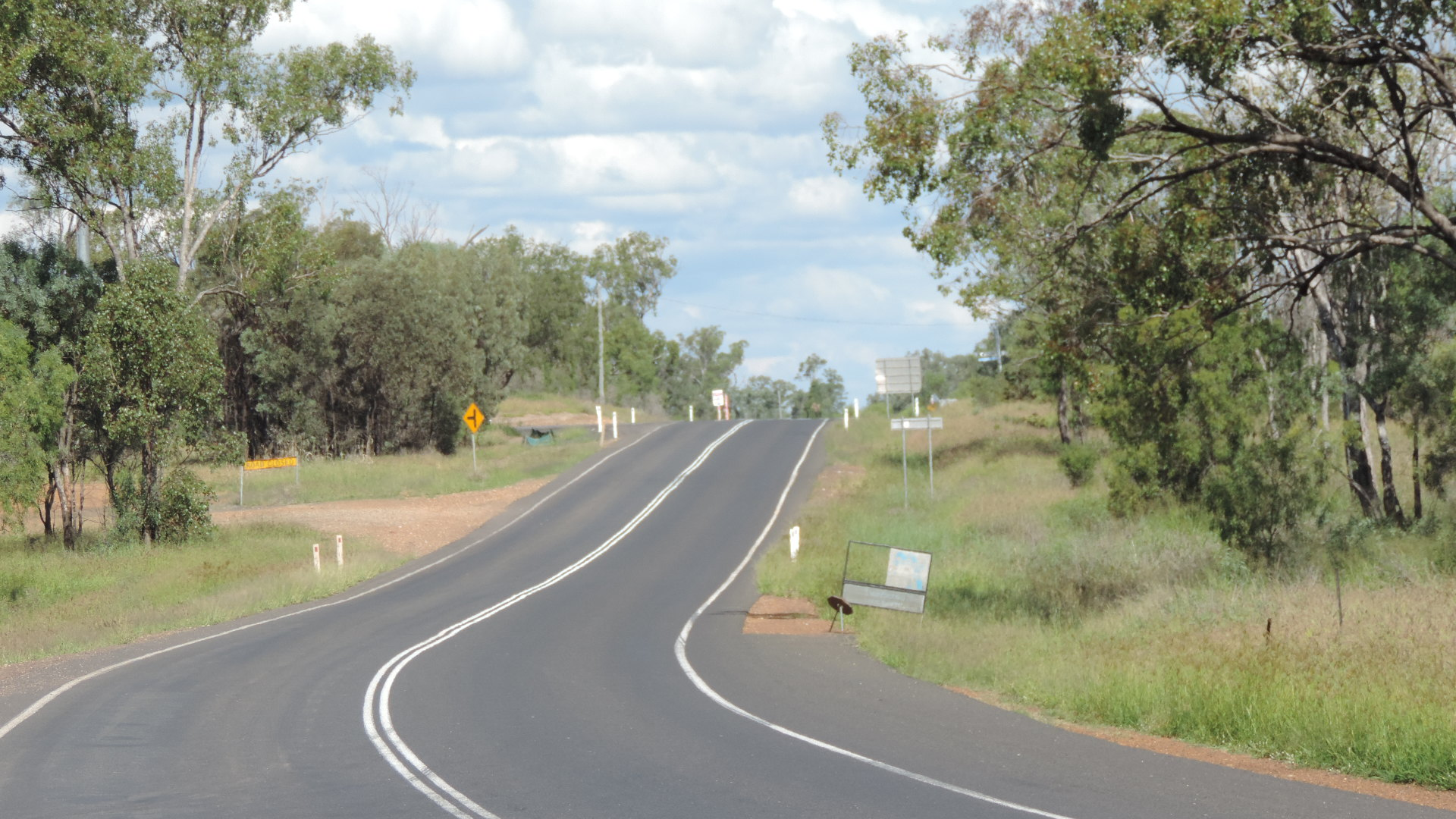
Leichhardt Highway, looking south from Guluguba Cafe, 2014

== See also ==
- Highways in Australia
- List of highways in Queensland
- List of highways numbered 85
