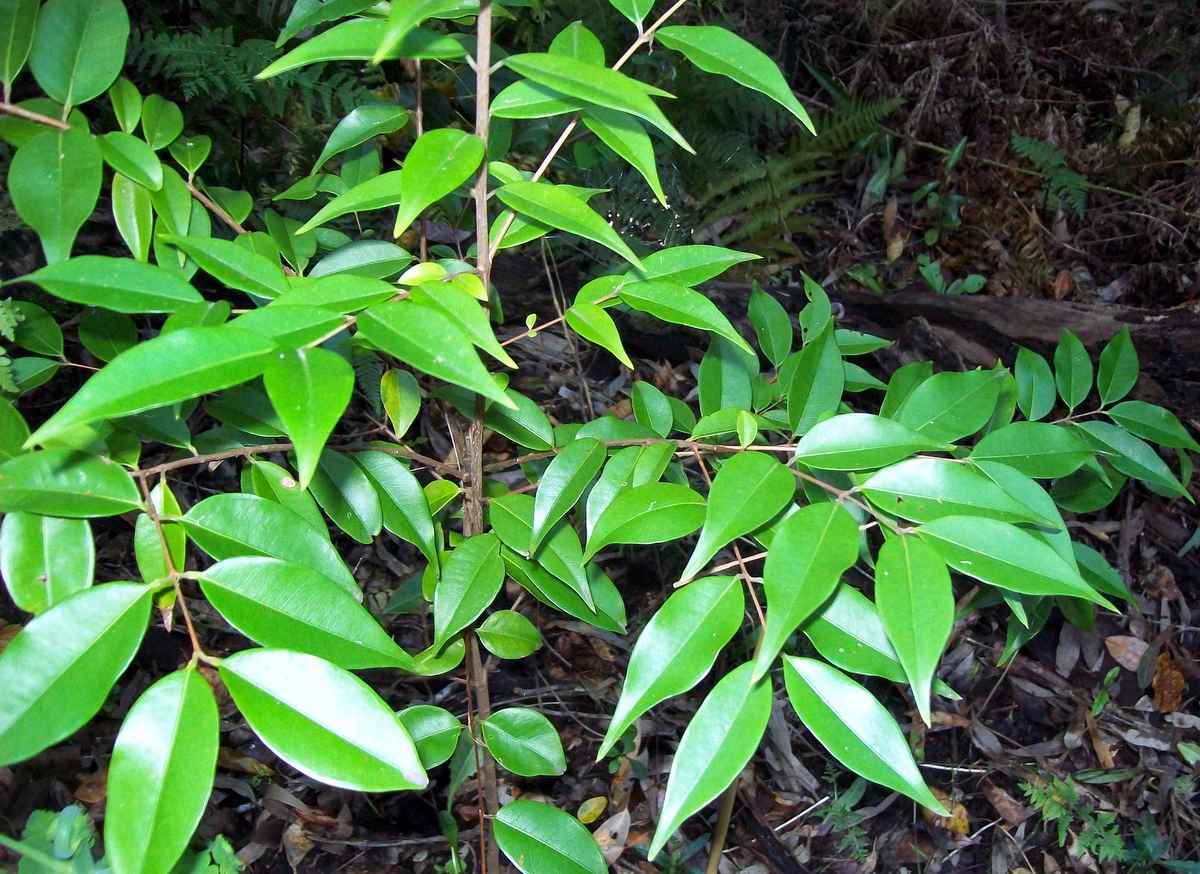

Conservation status
- Least Concern (IUCN 3.1)

Scientific classification
- Kingdom: Plantae
- Clade: Tracheophytes
- Clade: Angiosperms
- Clade: Eudicots
- Clade: Rosids
- Order: Myrtales
- Family: Myrtaceae
- Genus: Decaspermum
- Species: D. humile

Binomial name
- Decaspermum humile (G.Don) A.J.Scott

Synonyms
- Myrtus sericocalyx C.White; Nelitris humilis G.Don; Decaspermum paniculatum (Lindl.) Kurz; Decaspermum parviflorum (Lam.) A.J.Scott

= Decaspermum humile =

Species of tree

Decaspermum humile, commonly known as the silky myrtle, is a tree from Australia and Asia. It can be used as bush food, as indicated by the alternate common name of currant myrtle. The tree features an attractive dark glossy crown. The new pink leaves with silvery hairs are particularly appealing.

== Taxonomy ==
First described as Nelitris humilis by Scottish botanist George Don in 1832, it gained its current name in 1980 when reclassified in the genus Decaspermum. Decaspermum refers to 'ten seeds' as is often the case with this plant. Humile refers to 'small' or 'lowly', as it is often seen as a bush or small tree. However, this is not always the case, as some examples of Decaspermum humile can reach 25 metres (80 ft) tall.

== Description ==
A shrub or small tree, occasionally reaching 25 metres (80 ft) in height and a stem diameter of 45 cm (18 in). The trunk is often angled, crooked or fluted. Larger specimens may be slightly buttressed at the base. The bark is rough and brown, but with light papery vertical scales. Small branches are covered with silvery hairs, which later become fibrous and have a red brown colour.

=== Leaves ===
The leaves are 2 to 8 cm (0.8–3.6 in) long, and 1.5 to 3 cm (0.6–1.2 in) wide. In the typical shape of the lillypilly group, it may easily be confused in the field with plants of the genus Syzygium. The leaves are arranged oppositely on the stem, and are entire, ovate to lanceolate with a prominent drip tip. The leaf margins are rolled over as in the purple cherry and contrasting to the flat margins with the python tree and scrub ironwood. Leaves are dark green on both sides, though somewhat less glossy under the leaf. New leaves are pink with silvery hairs.

Oil dots are tiny and hard to determine. The leaf stalk is between 3 and 7 mm long. Leaf venation is generally unclear apart from the midrib, being raised on both sides. However, the lateral veins are practically invisible. Net veins are not seen, although there is an indistinct intra-marginal vein around the edge of the leaf.

=== Flowers, fruit and regeneration ===
The white or pale mauve flowers appear in thyrses in March to May, though occasionally as late as October. Flowers form either from the leaf axils or from the ends of branchlets. The fruit is a black round berry, crowned by calyx lobes. Inside the fruit are around ten seeds, 3 to 6 mm in diameter. The fruit matures from May to November. Regeneration can yield good results if the flesh is removed from the seed. Soaking may also assist in drowning insect larvae. After three months around half of the seeds may germinate. Cuttings have also proven successful.

== Distribution and habitat ==
The habitat is the drier rainforests, usually on shallow rocky soils of a volcanic origin. Common Australian associate species are the python tree and scrub ironwood. In Australia it is found from as far south as Ourimbah, New South Wales, up to northern Queensland, and is also found in Southeast Asia and India. It is one of two members of its genus to reach Australia, the other being the extremely rare Decaspermum struckoilicum.

== Cultivation ==
The attractive furrowed bark, glossy foliage and fragrant flowers give the species horticultural potential. It is suitable as an indoor plant or in a tub planting.
