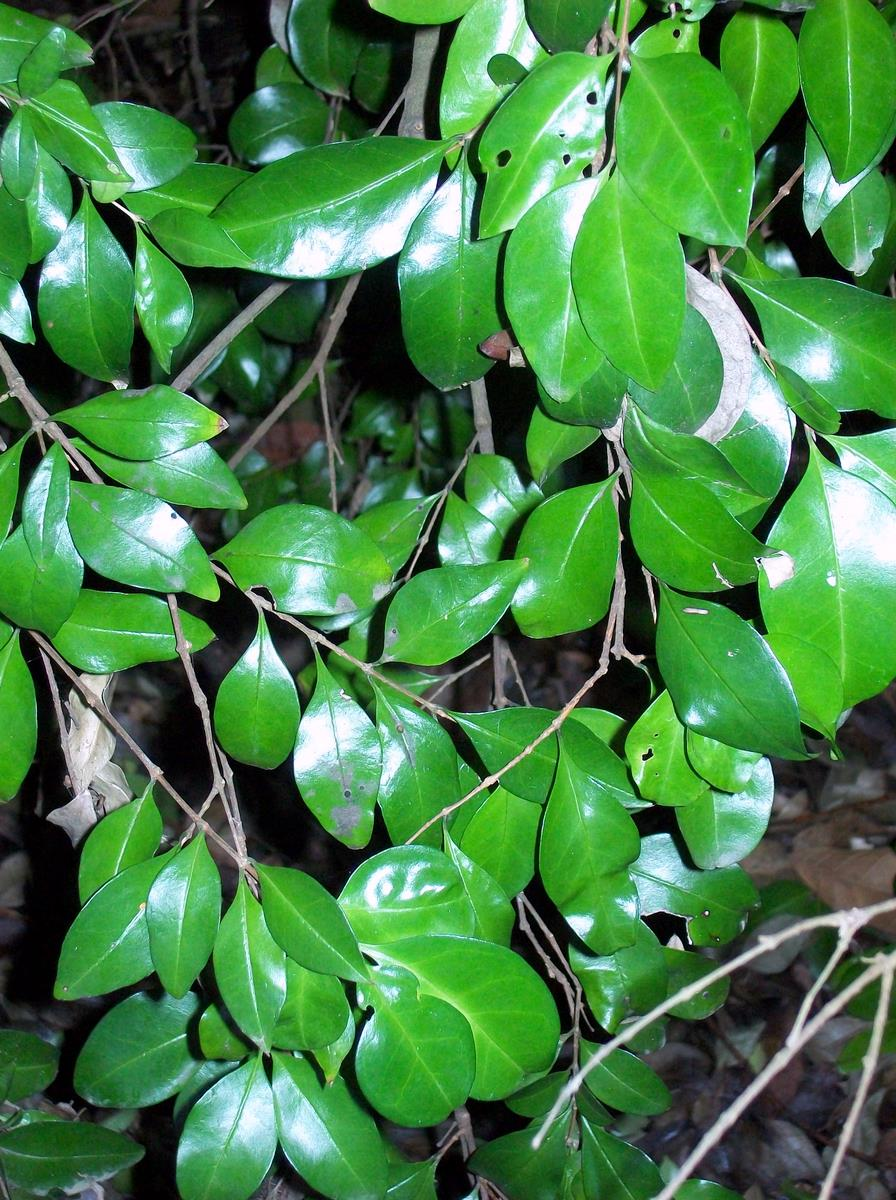

Conservation status
- Endangered (EPBC Act)

Scientific classification
- Kingdom: Plantae
- Clade: Tracheophytes
- Clade: Angiosperms
- Clade: Eudicots
- Clade: Rosids
- Order: Myrtales
- Family: Myrtaceae
- Genus: Gossia
- Species: G. fragrantissima

Binomial name
- Gossia fragrantissima (F.Muell. ex Benth.) N.Snow & Guymer

Synonyms
- Myrtus fragrantissima F.Muell. ex Benth.; Austromyrtus fragrantissima (F.Muell. ex Benth.) Burret

= Gossia fragrantissima =

Sweet myrtle

Species of tree

Gossia fragrantissima, the sweet myrtle or small-leaved myrtle, is a shrub or small tree of eastern Australia. A plant with a ROTAP rating of 3EC-, endangered by extinction.

It is found in sub-tropical rainforests near streams, from near Woodburn, New South Wales to Nambour in southeastern Queensland. It features fragrant flowers, hence the specific epithet fragrantissima. White flowers grow from October to February.

The sweet myrtle may grow to seven metres tall. Bark is rough, fawn brown in colour, often flaking off in small particles. The berry matures in January and February, globular in shape, 4 to 6 mm in diameter. It may appear green, yellow, orange or red. The fruit has four persistent calyx lobes. Leaves are opposite on the stem, broad ovate, 1.5 to 5 cm long, 8 to 25 mm wide.

An intra-marginal leaf vein is usually absent. Leaves are without toothed edges and have only 5 to 8 lateral veins, only visible on the underside. Gossia acmenoides and Gossia bidwillii have 15 to 20 lateral veins. Regeneration is difficult from seed, and cuttings seldom strike. The former habitat is now mostly destroyed for housing and agriculture.

== Taxonomy ==
The species was first described in 1867 by Ferdinand von Mueller as Myrtus fragrantissima, but in 2003 was transferred to the genus, Gossia, by Neil Snow, Gordon Guymer and Sawvel.
