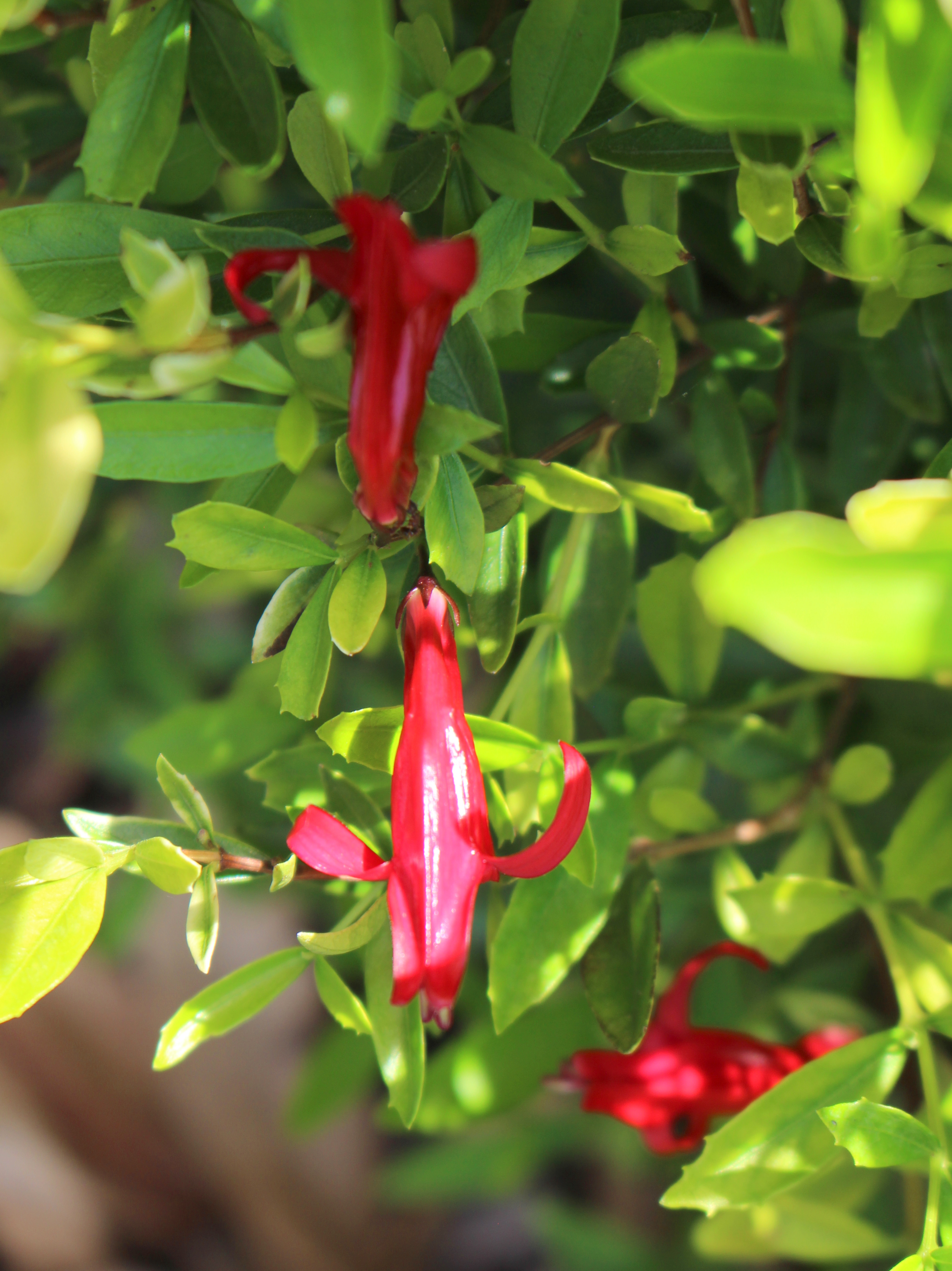

Conservation status
- Near Threatened (NCA)

Scientific classification
- Kingdom: Plantae
- Clade: Tracheophytes
- Clade: Angiosperms
- Clade: Eudicots
- Clade: Asterids
- Order: Lamiales
- Family: Acanthaceae
- Genus: Graptophyllum
- Species: G. excelsum

Binomial name
- Graptophyllum excelsum (F.Muell.) Druce

= Graptophyllum excelsum =

Species of shrub

Graptophyllum excelsum, the scarlet fuchsia, is a shrub in the family Acanthaceae. It is native to Queensland, Australia, often found on limestone on the edges of monsoon forest and vine thickets. The attractive flowers and adaptable nature make this plant suitable as an ornamental garden plant.

== Phenology ==
Graptophyllum excelsum has been observed to produce flowers for most of the year with fruiting occurring during January, July, and November.

== Distribution and habitat ==
This species occurs along coastal area of Northern and Southern Queensland. The northern populations are found occurring in Dimbulah, Chillagoe and between Townsville and Charters Towers.

Graptophyllum excelsum occurs in semi-evergreen vine thickets typically on limestone rocky outcroppings. Near Chillagoe it is known to occur in grassy woodland in association with Eucalyptus cullenii and Corymbia erythrophloia. Other species commonly associated with it include Gyrocarpus americanus, Lysiphyllum hookeri, Acacia fasciculifera, Brachychiton australis, Archidendropsis thozetiana, Gossia bidwillii, Alstonia constricta', Alyxia ruscifolia, Alchornea ilicifolia, and Macropteranthes.

=== Protected areas ===
Graptophyllum excelsum occurs within the Chillagoe-Mungana Caves National Park, Mount Etna Caves National Park, Mount Archer National Park, Mingela State Forest, Bouldercombe Gorge Regional Reserve, Beecher State Forest, Rundle Range State Forest, and Jimna State Forest.

== Conservation status ==
Graptophyllum excelsum is listed as "near threatened" under the Queensland Nature Conservation Act 1992. It is not listed under the Australian Environment Protection and Biodiversity Conservation Act 1999.

== Threats ==
Threats to this species includes degradation and destruction of habitat through clearing of vegetation with possible further threats such as invasion of Lantana camara (lntana), Ziziphus mauritiana (Chinese apple), and Cryptostegia grandiflora (rubber vine). Inappropriate fire regimes negatively impacts this species as it is fire sensitive and lacks the ability to recover post-fire.
