= Bouldercombe Gorge Resources Reserve =

Bushland reserve in Queensland, Australia

Coordinates: 23°35′51.56″S 150°28′55.10″E

Bouldercombe Gorge Resources Reserve, contains 3 sections of scenic bushland reserves situated near the small town of Bouldercombe and Struck Oil near Rockhampton in Central Queensland, Australia. The largest section is situated to the south between Gelobera State Forest and Ulam Range State Forest. The gorge cuts into the Razorback Range and Crocodile Creek runs along the gorge floor.

The resource reserve is also declared a regional park, formerly known as a conservation park, where natural, conservation, and cultural values are protected under the Queensland Nature Conservation Act 1992. Resource extraction within these areas continue to be utilised under authorisation by the Queensland Government.

Originally called "Crocodile Creek", the area saw a small gold rush during the late 19th century. Today, gold is still mined in Bouldercombe, but only by amateurs. The mine still has a wide variety of gold alloys, and is a particularly good spot for alluvial.

The total area of the reserve is 39.7 km^{2}.

Bouldercombe Gorge Resources Reserve terrain is located at an estimated elevation of 377 metres above sea level.

== Conservation ==
The reserve protects 8 regional ecosystems, of which 3 have an 'of concern' biodiversity status.

Threatened flora in the park include Decaspermum struckoilicum (Critically Endangered), Cossinia australiana (Endangered), Cycas megacarpa (Endangered), Graptophyllum excelsum (Near threatened), Hernandia bivalvis (Near threatened). Threatened fauna in the park include Turnix melanogaster (Vulnerable).

== See also ==
- Protected areas of Queensland
