= Walterhall =

- Suburb
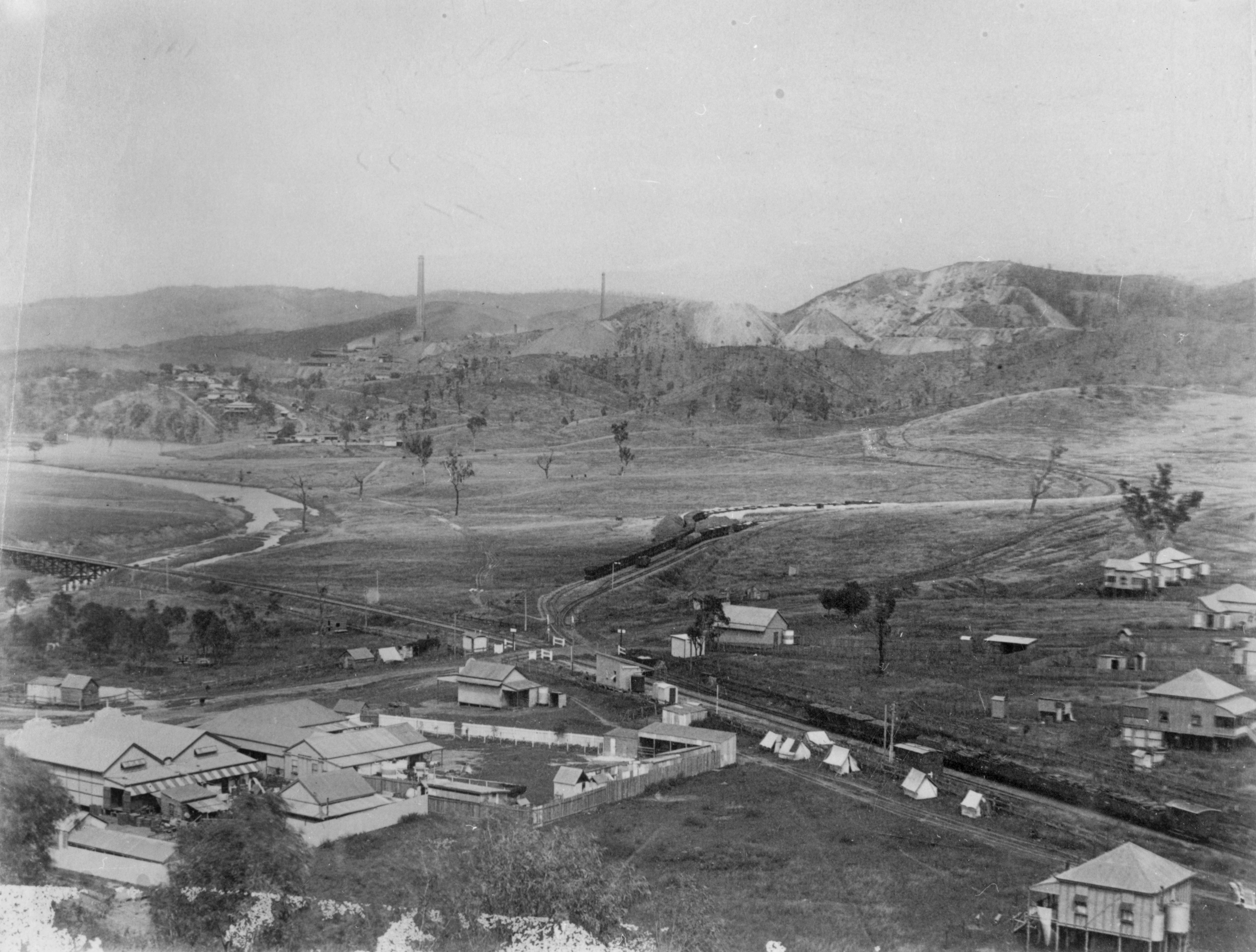
- Overlooking the suburb of Walterhall towards Mount Morgan Mine, circa 1911

- Interactive map of Walterhall
- Coordinates: 23.6291°S 150.3833°E
- Country: Australia
- State: Queensland
- LGA: Rockhampton Region
- Location: 2.8 km (1.7 mi) NW of Mount Morgan; 37.5 km (23.3 mi) SW of Rockhampton; 648 km (403 mi) NNW of Brisbane

Government
  - State electorate: Mirani
  - Federal division: Flynn

Area
  - Total: 0.6 km^{2} (0.23 sq mi)

Population
  - Total: 156 (2021 census)
  - Density: 260/km^{2} (670/sq mi)
- Time zone: UTC+10:00 (AEST)
- Postcode: 4714
Suburbs around Walterhall
The Mine	Baree	Baree
The Mine	Walterhall	Baree
The Mine	The Mine	Mount Morgan

Walterhall is a residential locality in the Rockhampton Region, Queensland, Australia. Located north-west and adjacent to the town of Mount Morgan, it is effectively a suburb of that town. In the 2021 census, Walterhall had a population of 156 people.

== Geography ==
The Burnett Highway passes to the east of the locality.

The land use is predominantly suburban housing with some land being unused for any purpose.

== History ==
The locality takes its name from the Walter Hall railway station, which was named on 26 November 1898 after businessman Walter Russell Hall, who was a major shareholder in the Mount Morgan Gold Mining Company Limited.

Walterhall State School opened on 9 July 1917. It closed circa 31 December 1969.

== Demographics ==
In the 2016 census, Walterhall had a population of 138 people.

In the 2021 census, Walterhall had a population of 156 people.

== Education ==
There are no schools in Walterhall. The nearest government primary and secondary schools are Mount Morgan Central State School and Mount Morgan State High School, both in neighbouring Mount Morgan to the south-east.
