= Baree, Queensland =

Baree
- Suburb
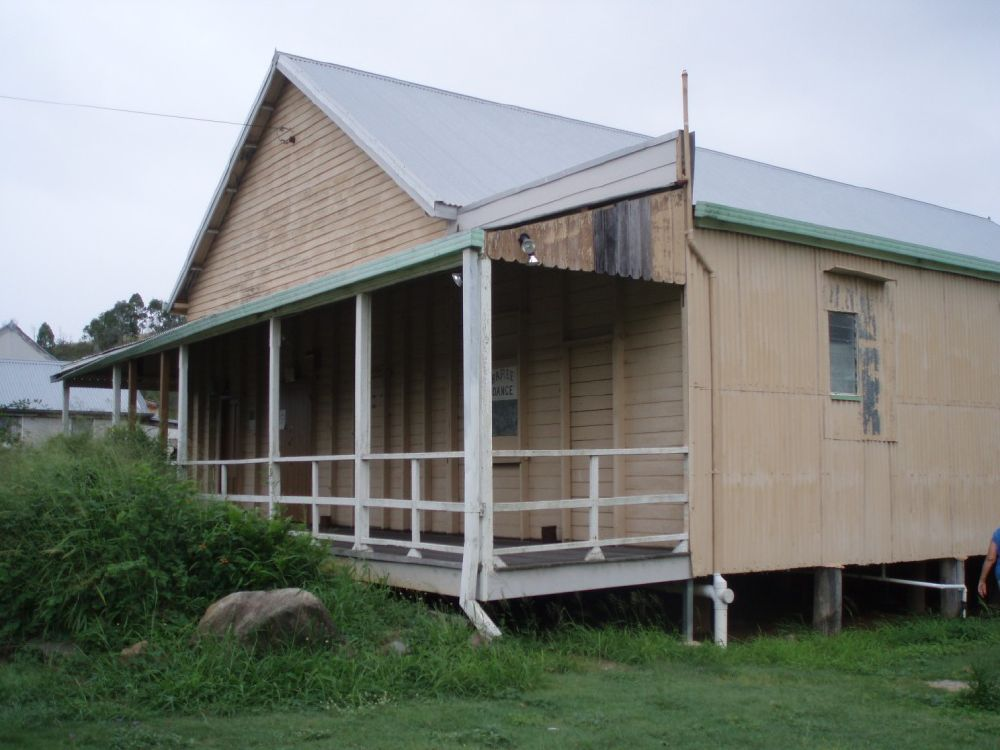
- Baree School of Arts, 2009

- Interactive map of Baree
- Coordinates: 23.6211°S 150.3897°E
- Country: Australia
- State: Queensland
- LGA: Rockhampton Region
- Location: 3.3 km (2.1 mi) N of Mount Morgan; 35.3 km (21.9 mi) SSW of Rockhampton; 651 km (405 mi) NNW of Brisbane

Government
  - State electorate: Mirani
  - Federal division: Flynn

Area
  - Total: 1.4 km^{2} (0.54 sq mi)

Population
  - Total: 201 (2021 census)
  - Density: 144/km^{2} (372/sq mi)
- Time zone: UTC+10:00 (AEST)
- Postcode: 4714
Suburbs around Baree
The Mine	Moongan	Leydens Hill
The Mine	Baree	Leydens Hill
Walterhall	Walterhall	Mount Morgan

Baree is a rural locality in the Rockhampton Region, Queensland, Australia. In the 2021 census, Baree had a population of 201 people.

== Geography ==
The Burnett Highway runs along the south-eastern boundary.

The land use around the north-south corridor (Razorback Road / Creek Street / Old Baree Road) is predominantly rural residential. The east of the locality is used for grazing on native vegetation, while the west of the locality is undeveloped. land.

== History ==
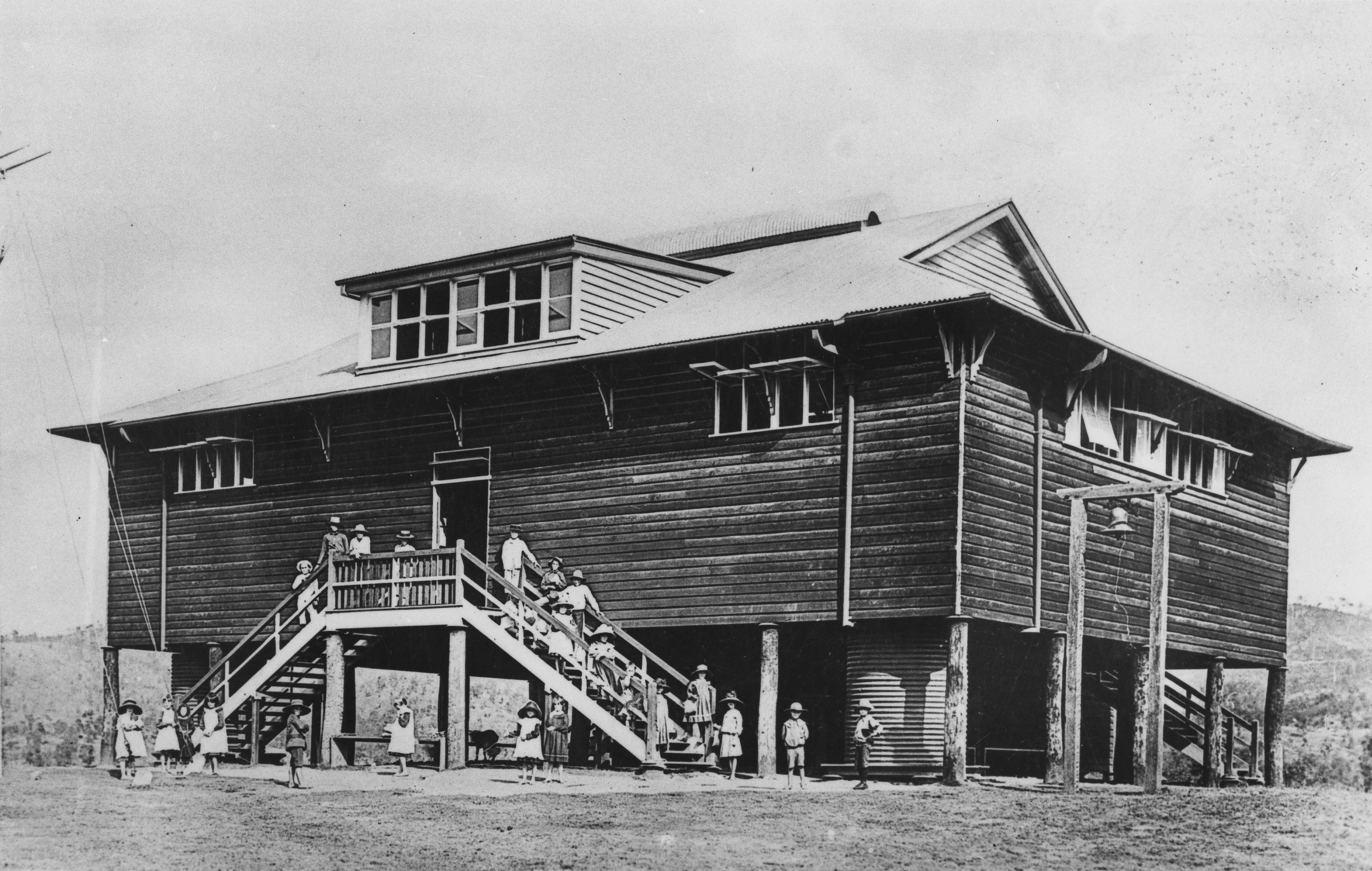
Baree State School (officially Calliungal North State School), circa 1912

The name Baree is thought to be an Aboriginal word meaning either crooked (winding) creek or timber.

Calliungal North State School (also known unofficially as North Culliungal State School and Baree State School) opened in April 1904, closing in 1929. In 1933 it reopened, closing finally in 1971. It was at 3-5 Calliungal Road (23.6130°S 150.39134°E).

Baree Post Office opened by 1917 (a receiving office had been open from around 1901) and closed in 1975.

The Dawson Valley railway line from Kabra to Mount Morgan was officially opened on Friday 2 December 1898, with two railway stations in Baree:

- Kirkhall railway station (23.6188°S 150.3915°E)
- Baree railway station (23.6236°S 150.3895°E)

The railway line closed on 1 August 1987 and the railway stations are now abandoned.

== Demographics ==
In the 2016 census, Baree had a population of 164 people.

In the 2021 census, Baree had a population of 201 people.

== Heritage listings ==
Baree has a number of heritage-listed sites, including:

- Baree School of Arts, 18 Creek Street (23.6206°S 150.3906°E)

== Education ==
There are no schools in Baree. The nearest government primary and secondary schools are Mount Morgan Central State School and Mount Morgan State High School, both in neighbouring Mount Morgan to the south-east.
