= Gossia punctata =

Conservation status
- Critically Endangered (NCA)

Scientific classification
- Kingdom: Plantae
- Clade: Tracheophytes
- Clade: Angiosperms
- Clade: Eudicots
- Clade: Rosids
- Order: Myrtales
- Family: Myrtaceae
- Genus: Gossia
- Species: G. punctata

Binomial name
- Gossia punctata N.Snow & Guymer, 2003

Species of flowering plant

Gossia punctata, commonly known as the dotted myrtle, is a species of flowering plant in the family Myrtaceae that is native to South East Queensland and northern New South Wales in Australia.

== Description ==
It grows as a shrub or tree to a height of 3 to 15 metres. The species flowers from October to January and produces fruit from January to April.

== Habitat & distribution ==
The species is restricted to eastern Australia with a known range spanning from Bauple in the north to Deep Creek in the south. It is most often found in subtropical rainforest, microphyll vine forest and sclerophyll woodlands.

== Conservation ==
Under the Nature Conservation Act 1992 in Queensland it has been classified as critically endangered.
