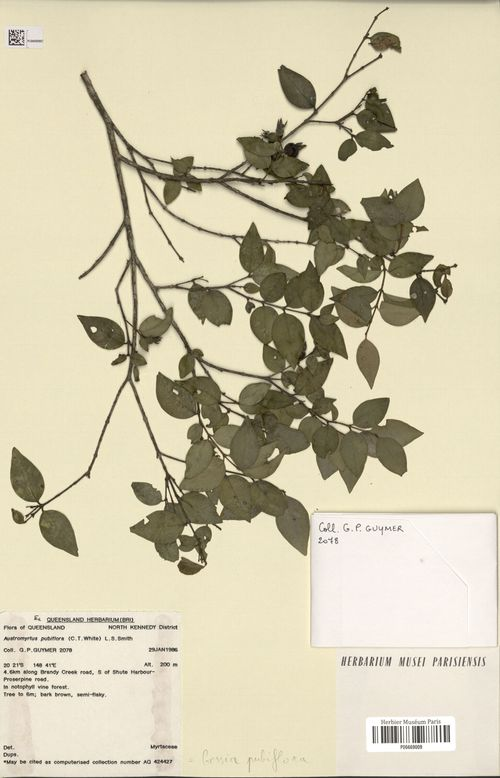

Scientific classification
- Kingdom: Plantae
- Clade: Tracheophytes
- Clade: Angiosperms
- Clade: Eudicots
- Clade: Rosids
- Order: Myrtales
- Family: Myrtaceae
- Genus: Gossia
- Species: G. pubiflora

Binomial name
- Gossia pubiflora N.Snow & Guymer

Synonyms
- Myrtus pubiflora C.T.White; Astromyrtus pubiflora C.T.White

= Gossia pubiflora =

Species of tree

Gossia pubiflora is a species of plant in the family Myrtaceae that is endemic to coastal central east Queensland. It is a shrub or small tree that grows to a height of 1 to 6 m (3 ft 3 in to 19 ft 8 in) tall.

== Taxonomy ==
The species was first described in 1939 as Myrtus floribunda by C.T. White, but was reassigned to the genus, Gossia, in 2003 by Neil Snow, Gordon Guymer and Sawvel.

== Description ==
The bark is rough and flaky being light brown or gray in colour. Leaves are elliptic to ovate, 1.8 to 5.5 cm (0.71 to 2.17 in) long and 0.8 to 3.3 cm (0.31 to 1.30 in) wide, opposite arrangement, entire margins, oil dots are common. Flowers have 5 petals, petals are yellowish white and measure 4 to 5 mm (0.16 to 0.20 in) in length, hypanthium is cup shaped and is a greenish brown colour. Fruit are globose, 9 to 17 mm (0.35 to 0.67 in) long and 11 to 19 mm (0.43 to 0.75 in) wide, colour is red to nearly black, each fruit contains 1 seed, the crushed fruit apparently smells like methanol.

== Distribution ==
Gossia pubiflora is endemic to coastal central east Queensland, which is south of Townsville and north of Rockhampton. Based on the records of the Australasian Virtual Herbarium records, its main population occurs in the Airlie Beach region.
