= Baree School of Arts =

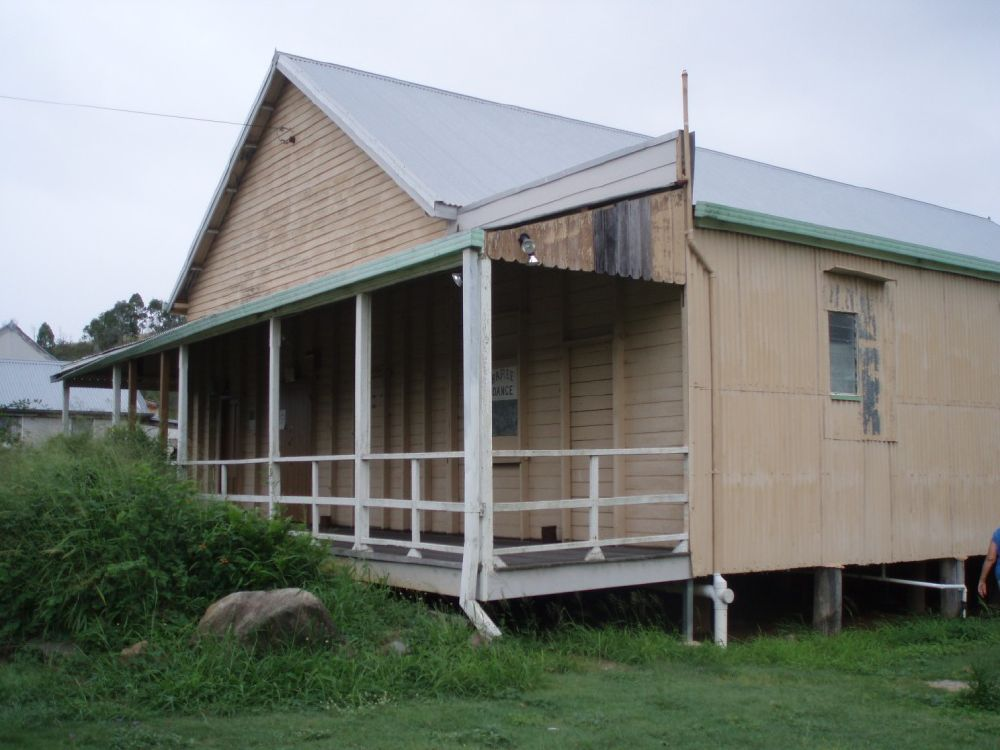
- Baree School of Arts, 2009

- Location within Queensland Location within Australia
- 23.6206°S 150.3906°E
- Location: Creek Street, Baree, Rockhampton Region, Queensland, Australia

History
- Design period: 1900 - 1914 (early 20th century)
- Built: 1910

Site notes
- Architectural style: Classicism

Queensland Heritage Register
- Official name: Baree School of Arts
- Type: state heritage (built)
- Designated: 25 January 2001
- Reference no.: 602071
- Significant period: 1910s (historical); 1910s-1920s (fabric); 1910-ongoing (social)
- Significant components: school of arts

Baree School of Arts is a heritage-listed school of arts at Creek Street, Baree, Rockhampton Region, Queensland, Australia. It was built in 1910. It was added to the Queensland Heritage Register on 25 January 2001.

== History ==
Constructed in 1910 the Baree School of Arts is a modest timber building located at Creek Street, Baree.

The School of Arts movement began in the 1820s, when Mechanics Institutes were established in Glasgow and London, and a School of Arts was established in Edinburgh. Their intention was to promote mental and moral improvement of the working classes, although it appears they were often directed more towards the middle classes, with lectures on subjects such as philosophy, and classes in French and Latin, which may not have appealed to a largely illiterate working class. Some institutes also provided technical classes including measured drawing, painting and typewriting and all Schools of Arts provided a variety of entertainments as well as games, lending libraries and reading rooms.

The first institute in Australia was formed in Hobart in 1827, followed by Sydney in 1833, from which date the movement rapidly spread throughout the rest of the colony. The first School of Arts in Queensland was established in Brisbane in 1846, although a building was not erected for the purpose until 1864. From this beginning, approximately 350 Schools of Arts were established throughout the state during the nineteenth and twentieth centuries.

A typical School of Arts building was of timber construction including a hall and two or three rooms used for library and meeting purposes. Larger provincial centres buildings were of masonry construction. Although varied in scale, form and materials they were readily identifiable in the streetscape and often incorporated impressive facades which spoke of the cultural ambitions of those who built them. Essentially the school of arts building type became an integral part of townscape fabric along with the police station, the courthouse, churches and schools.

The Baree School of Arts developed in association with the mining settlement at Mount Morgan. Gold was discovered in the Mount Morgan region by Edwin Morgan, Thomas Morgan and Sandy Gordon in 1882 and from this early discovery the town grew. The government took action to establish a township to service the new mine and in 1884 the District Surveyor instructed Surveyor Byerley to undertake a survey of land adjoining the mine. The original town survey included two subdivisions and these areas were referred to as north and south Calliungal, but have always been known locally as Baree and Mount Morgan respectively.

Mt Morgan developed as the central township to the region however over the next 10–20 years the services provided in the main township were duplicated in outer localities such as Baree, Red Hill and Victoria. At its peak in 1916 Baree sustained a settlement of 500–600 people and the School of Arts was just one of a number of buildings which lined Creek Street and formed the centre of the township. Today the School of Arts is one of only a few buildings that remain as part of the original streetscape.

Prior to the establishment of the Baree School of Arts a school had been established in Mount Morgan in 1891. This building was destroyed by fire and a new building erected in 1923 only to be destroyed by fire again. The existing School of Arts building is the structure that was erected following these disasters. It is not clear what the impetus for the Baree School of Arts was however, most Schools of Arts established in Queensland were driven by community minded men, usually of middle or upper class.

The Baree School of Arts was officially opened on 20 October 1910 by Captain G A Richards the General Manager of Mount Morgan Gold Mining Company Limited. The land on which the school was constructed was reserved for that purpose in July 1909. It is not clear if an architect was commissioned to design the structure or who the builder may have been. However, considering the modest nature of the structure it may be that the facility was designed and constructed using community resources.

Over the past 90 years the Baree School of Arts has been used for various community leisure activities and receptions including dances, movies, weddings, parties and local resident meetings. The multitude of uses has resulted in some physical alteration to the building fabric, most notably the adaptation of the library/reading room to accommodate a toilet facility. However, despite these changes the original configuration of the building remains largely intact. The Baree School of Arts is a highly valued community resource and an important remnant of a town ship which once serviced one of the biggest gold mines in the world.

== Description ==
The Baree School of Arts is located at Creek Street Baree, on a large parcel of land that falls gently from the street frontage to a creek which skirts the southern and eastern boundaries of the site. The building is set into the north west corner of the site and addresses Creek Street. A well maintained garden is located at the front of the building while the remainder of the site is an open grassed area with a few mature plantings lining the edge of the creek.

The school building is elevated above ground level on timber stumps and is constructed of timber with a corrugated iron gable roof to the main hall and simple skillion roofs over the front and side veranda structures. Externally the street frontage of the building is clad with timber tongue-and-groove boards below the verandah roof and weatherboards above it, while the remaining three elevations are clad with corrugated iron.

The main entry to the building is from Creek Street by a recently constructed ramp structure that abuts the verandah. A centrally located set of French doors form the main entry to the school however there are also two single leaf doors located either side of the main doors providing a secondary entry to the hall and separate entry to the enclosed verandah and area that was once the library. A secondary access to the hall is provided via a timber stair which adjoins the southern enclosed verandah.

A number of brass memorial plaques are located at the entry to the building. These plaques memorialise local residents associated with the School of Arts as well as the official opening of the building and the parties involved with the construction of the new entry ramp.

The building is rectilinear in plan and includes a large hall and associated stage area as well as toilet facilities, a kitchen and meeting area all located on the enclosed verandah. The ceiling follows the line of the rafters in the hall and on the verandah and is not lined. Similarly, walls are generally not lined however a combination of timber weatherboards, tongue and groove boarding and corrugated iron have been used on some sections of wall. At least one original six pane double hung window survives in the building, the remainder having been replaced with metal framed glass louvres.

The undercroft of the building is predominantly natural ground but does include a small section of concrete pavement located directly under the stage area. A number of concrete plinths and associated holding down bolts indicate an element of some size was once secured to the floor.

== Heritage listing ==
Baree School of Arts was listed on the Queensland Heritage Register on 25 January 2001 having satisfied the following criteria.

The place is important in demonstrating the evolution or pattern of Queensland's history.

The Baree School of Arts was constructed in 1910. It is one of many School of Arts constructed throughout Queensland in the nineteenth and early twentieth centuries as part of an attempt to promote mental and moral improvement of the working classes. By the 1900s, almost every town in Queensland had a School of Arts and they were often seen as indicators of the prosperity or status of the town. As such, they demonstrate the evolution of Queensland's history.

The Baree School of Arts was once part of a cluster of buildings which formed the core of the Baree township and serviced the Mt Morgan mine. As a remnant structure of this township the building helps to demonstrate the growth of the region surrounding Mt Morgan and the community infrastructure which developed within those settlements.

The place is important in demonstrating the principal characteristics of a particular class of cultural places.

Whilst not as grand as its Mt Morgan neighbour the Baree School of Arts is a modest structure perhaps more reflective of a public facility conceived using community resources. The building has been physically altered over time however, it remains largely intact and does demonstrate the principal characteristics of a building of its type, with provision for a hall, reading room and library.

The place is important because of its aesthetic significance.

Today the building stands as the only significant structure in the Creek Street streetscape.

The place has a strong or special association with a particular community or cultural group for social, cultural or spiritual reasons.

Over the past ninety years the school of arts building has accommodated a multitude of community gatherings, including public meetings, dances, movies and private functions. As such the place has a strong association with the residents of Baree and stands as community focal point within the township.
