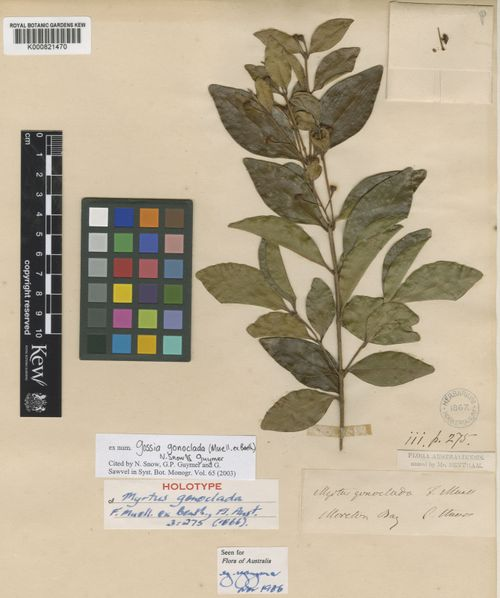
- specimen K000821470 (image CC-BY 4.0, Royal Botanic Gardens, Kew)

Conservation status
- Endangered (EPBC Act)

Scientific classification
- Kingdom: Plantae
- Clade: Embryophytes
- Clade: Tracheophytes
- Clade: Spermatophytes
- Clade: Angiosperms
- Clade: Eudicots
- Clade: Rosids
- Order: Myrtales
- Family: Myrtaceae
- Genus: Gossia
- Species: G. gonoclada

Binomial name
- Gossia gonoclada (F.Muell.) N.Snow & Guymer

Synonyms
- Myrtus gonoclada F.Muell. ex Benth.; Austromyrtus gonoclada (F.Muell. ex Benth.) Burret

= Gossia gonoclada =

Square-stemmed myrtle

Species of tree in the myrtle family

Gossia gonoclada, known as the square-stemmed or angle-stemmed myrtle for the distinctive four raised corners on the angled branchlets, is a rainforest tree of the family Myrtaceae, native to south-east Queensland, Australia. It is an endangered species.

== Taxonomy ==
The species was first described in 1867 as Myrtus gonoclada by Ferdinand von Mueller, and in 2003 was transferred to the genus, Gossia, by Neil Snow, Gordon Guymer and Sawvel.

== Etymology ==
The genus Gossia is named after former Queensland Premier, Wayne Goss. The specific epithet gonoclada means "angle-stemmed".

== History ==
The tree was first discovered by Charles Stuart in Moggill in the 1850s. Thought to be extinct for nearly a century, it was rediscovered by Glenn Leiper and Janet Hauser in December 1986, and the Gossia gonoclada Recovery Team was established by the Logan City Council in December 1995.

== Description ==
The leaves have four raised corners on angled branchlets, which are flushed pink when new, becoming dark green and glossy on the upper surface, duller and paler below. They produce a distinct scent when crushed.

The bark is pale brown. The white flowers are 6–9 mm in diameter and have 4–5 petals. The fruits are glossy berries 7–12 mm in diameter, ripening black. The flowering period is from October to November, with the fruits ripening from mid-January to February.

The tree may grow up to 18 metres (59 ft) in height.

== Distribution ==
Its known distribution is restricted to remnant lowland riparian rainforest between the Logan and Brisbane Rivers.

== Conservation ==
In 2001, 64 of the only known 73 natural Gossia gonoclada in the world were growing in the City of Logan. The Logan City Council has created the "Gossia gonoclada Recovery Plan 2019-2029", and as of March 2021 had planted 160 saplings around the city. Gossia gonoclada is listed as "critically endangered" under the Queensland Nature Conservation Act 1992.
