= Gossia byrnesii =

Scientific classification
- Kingdom: Plantae
- Clade: Tracheophytes
- Clade: Angiosperms
- Clade: Eudicots
- Clade: Rosids
- Order: Myrtales
- Family: Myrtaceae
- Genus: Gossia
- Species: G. byrnesii

Binomial name
- Gossia byrnesii N.Snow & Guymer

Species of plant

Gossia byrnesii is a tree in the Myrtaceae family, first described in 2003 by Neil Snow, Gordon Guymer and Sawvel.

At the time of its description it was considered critically endangered and was known only from its type specimen (a plant cultivated from material collected at Isabella Falls, Queensland).
