= Johnsons Hill, Queensland =

Johnsons Hill
- Suburb
- Interactive map of Johnsons Hill
- Coordinates: 23.6247°S 150.4116°E
- Country: Australia
- State: Queensland
- LGA: Rockhampton Region
- Location: 6.1 km (3.8 mi) NE of Mount Morgan; 33.9 km (21.1 mi) SSW of Rockhampton CBD; 644 km (400 mi) NNW of Brisbane

Government
  - State electorate: Mirani
  - Federal division: Flynn

Area
  - Total: 2.3 km^{2} (0.89 sq mi)

Population
  - Total: 7 (2021 census)
  - Density: 3.04/km^{2} (7.9/sq mi)
- Time zone: UTC+10:00 (AEST)
- Postcode: 4714
Suburbs around Johnsons Hill
Leydens Hill	Leydens Hill	Struck Oil
Mount Morgan	Johnsons Hill	Struck Oil
Mount Morgan	Struck Oil	Struck Oil

Johnsons Hill is a rural locality in the Rockhampton Region, Queensland, Australia. In the 2021 census, Johnsons Hill had a population of 7 people.

== Geography ==
The Burnett Highway runs along the northern boundary.

== Demographics ==
In the 2016 census, Johnsons Hill had a population of 10 people.

In the 2021 census, Johnsons Hill had a population of 7 people.

== Education ==
There are no schools in Johnsons Hill. The nearest government primary school is Mount Morgan Central State School in neighbouring Mount Morgan to the south-east. The nearest government secondary school is Mount Morgan State High School, also in Mount Morgan.
