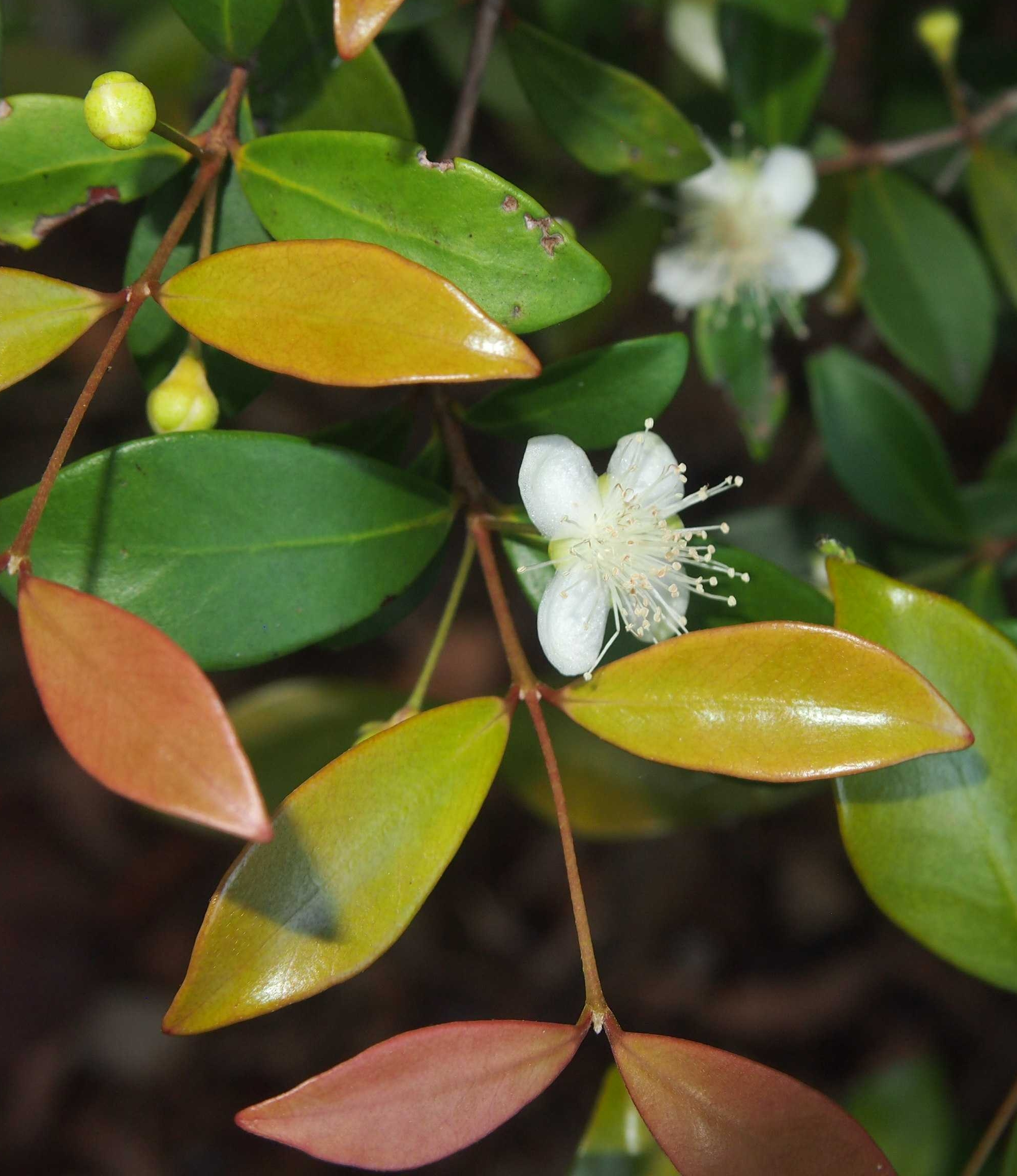
- Gossia bidwillii

Scientific classification
- Kingdom: Plantae
- Clade: Embryophytes
- Clade: Tracheophytes
- Clade: Spermatophytes
- Clade: Angiosperms
- Clade: Eudicots
- Clade: Rosids
- Order: Myrtales
- Family: Myrtaceae
- Subfamily: Myrtoideae
- Tribe: Myrteae
- Genus: Gossia; N.Snow & Guymer

Type species
- Gossia retusa N.Snow & Guymer

= Gossia =

Genus of flowering plants

Gossia is a genus of rainforest trees in the myrtle family first described as a genus in 2003 by Neil Snow and Gordon Guymer. It is native to northeastern Australia (Queensland and New South Wales) as well as several islands of Papuasia and New Caledonia.

== Description ==
Species of Gossia are shrubs or trees to about 20 m (66 ft), and may be single- or multi-stemmed. Stipules are scale- or hair-like, the leaves are leathery and opposite or (rarely) sub-opposite, and they have pinnate venation.

The inflorescences are produced at the end of the branchlets or in the leaf axils, and may be solitary, paired or clustered, and they may bear single flowers or multiple flowers in racemes or panicles.

The flowers usually have four or five partially fused, green sepals which are often persistent at the apex of the fruit. There are four or five white or yellowish concave petals and numerous stamens. The styles are straight, the stigmas are terete and only slightly wider than the style. The ovary has two locules with up to 30 ovules per placenta.

The fruits are, in botanical terms, berries which range in colour from orange to red to, most commonly, dark purple or black. They contain up to 10 seeds.

== Taxonomy ==
The type species is Gossia retusa. The name honours the conservation works of the former premier of Queensland, Wayne Goss.

== Species ==
As of March 2025, Plants of the World Online accepts the following 47 species:

- Gossia acmenoides (F.Muell.) N.Snow & Guymer
- Gossia alaternoides (Brongn. & Gris) N.Snow
- Gossia angustifolia N.Snow
- Gossia aphthosa (Vieill. ex Brongn. & Gris) N.Snow
- Gossia bamagensis N.Snow & Guymer
- Gossia bidwillii (Benth.) N.Snow & Guymer
- Gossia bourailensis N.Snow
- Gossia byrnesii N.Snow & Guymer
- Gossia clusioides (Brongn. & Gris) N.Snow
- Gossia colnettiana (Guillaumin) N.Snow
- Gossia conduplicata N.Snow
- Gossia conspicua (Vieill. ex Guillaumin) N.Snow
- Gossia dallachyana (F.Muell. ex Benth.) N.Snow & Guymer
- Gossia diversifolia (Brongn. & Gris) N.Snow
- Gossia eugenioides (A.J.Scott) N.Snow
- Gossia floribunda (A.J.Scott) N.Snow & Guymer
- Gossia fragrantissima (F.Muell. ex Benth.) N.Snow & Guymer
- Gossia gonoclada (F.Muell. ex Benth.) N.Snow & Guymer
- Gossia grayi N.Snow & Guymer
- Gossia hillii (Benth.) N.Snow & Guymer
- Gossia inophloia (J.F.Bailey & C.T.White) N.Snow & Guymer
- Gossia kaalaensis N.Snow
- Gossia katepahiensis N.Snow
- Gossia kuakuensis (Baker f.) N.Snow
- Gossia lewisensis N.Snow & Guymer
- Gossia longipetiolata N.Snow
- Gossia lucida (Gaertn.) N.Snow & Guymer
- Gossia macilwraithensis N.Snow & Guymer
- Gossia mandjeliaensis N.Snow
- Gossia myrsinocarpa (F.Muell.) N.Snow & Guymer
- Gossia ngaensis N.Snow
- Gossia nigripes (Guillaumin) N.Snow
- Gossia ouazangouensis N.Snow
- Gossia pancheri (Brongn. & Gris) N.Snow
- Gossia pubiflora (C.T.White) N.Snow & Guymer
- Gossia punctata N.Snow & Guymer
- Gossia ramiflora N.Snow
- Gossia randiana (Merr. & L.M.Perry) N.Snow
- Gossia retusa N.Snow & Guymer
- Gossia salomonensis (A.J.Scott) N.Snow
- Gossia sankowskyorum N.Snow & Guymer
- Gossia scottiana N.Snow
- Gossia shepherdii (F.Muell.) N.Snow & Guymer
- Gossia versteeghii (Merr. & L.M.Perry) N.Snow
- Gossia vieillardii (Brongn. & Gris) N.Snow
- Gossia virotii (Guillaumin) N.Snow
- Gossia yelana N.Snow & Peter G.Wilson
