= Moongan, Queensland =

Moongan
- Suburb
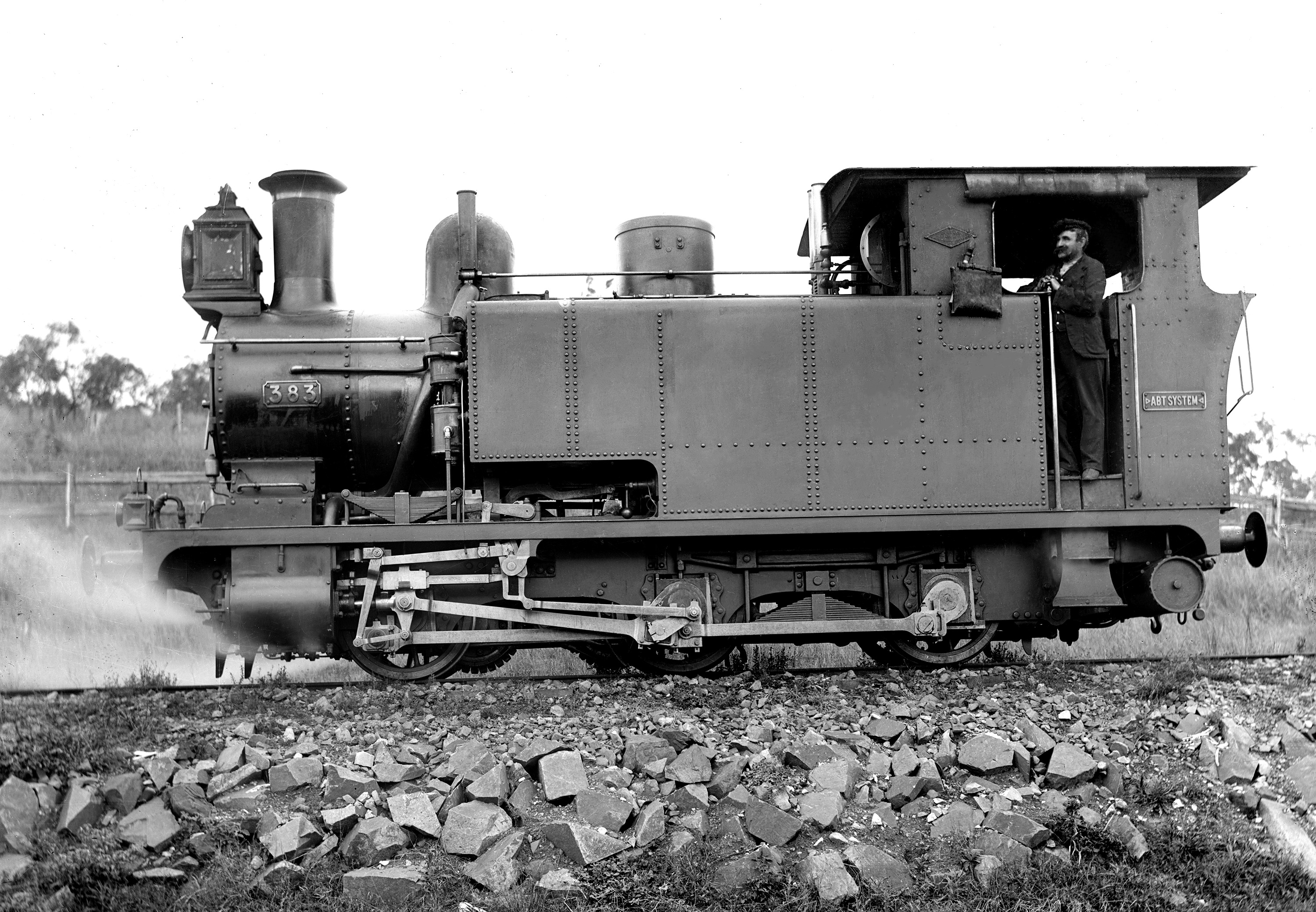
- Abt rack locomotive used to climb the Razorback Range to Moongan

- Interactive map of Moongan
- Coordinates: 23.6069°S 150.3991°E
- Country: Australia
- State: Queensland
- LGA: Rockhampton Region
- Location: 5.8 km (3.6 mi) N of Mount Morgan; 33.4 km (20.8 mi) SW of Rockhampton; 649 km (403 mi) NNW of Brisbane

Government
  - State electorate: Mirani
  - Federal division: Flynn

Area
  - Total: 3.8 km^{2} (1.5 sq mi)

Population
  - Total: 120 (2021 census)
  - Density: 31.6/km^{2} (82/sq mi)
- Time zone: UTC+10:00 (AEST)
- Postcode: 4714
Suburbs around Moongan
Bouldercombe	Bouldercombe	Bouldercombe
The Mine	Moongan	Leydens Hill
The Mine	Baree	Leydens Hill

Moongan is a rural locality in the Rockhampton Region, Queensland, Australia. In the 2021 census, Moongan had a population of 120 people.

== History ==
The locality takes its name from the former Moongan railway station (23.6064°S 150.3969°E) on the former Dawson Valley railway line. It is believed to be an Aboriginal word meaning top of hill.

The section of the railway line from Moonmera railway station to Mount Morgan opened on 26 November 1898. The section between Moonmera and Moongan involves a steep climb up the Razorback Range with a gradient too steep for a steam locomotive, so an Abt rack engine was additionally used on this section.

== Demographics ==
In the 2016 census, Moongan had a population of 118 people.

In the 2021 census, Moongan had a population of 120 people.

== Education ==
There are no schools in Moongan. The nearest government primary and secondary schools are Mount Morgan Central State School and Mount Morgan State High School, both in Mount Morgan to the south.
