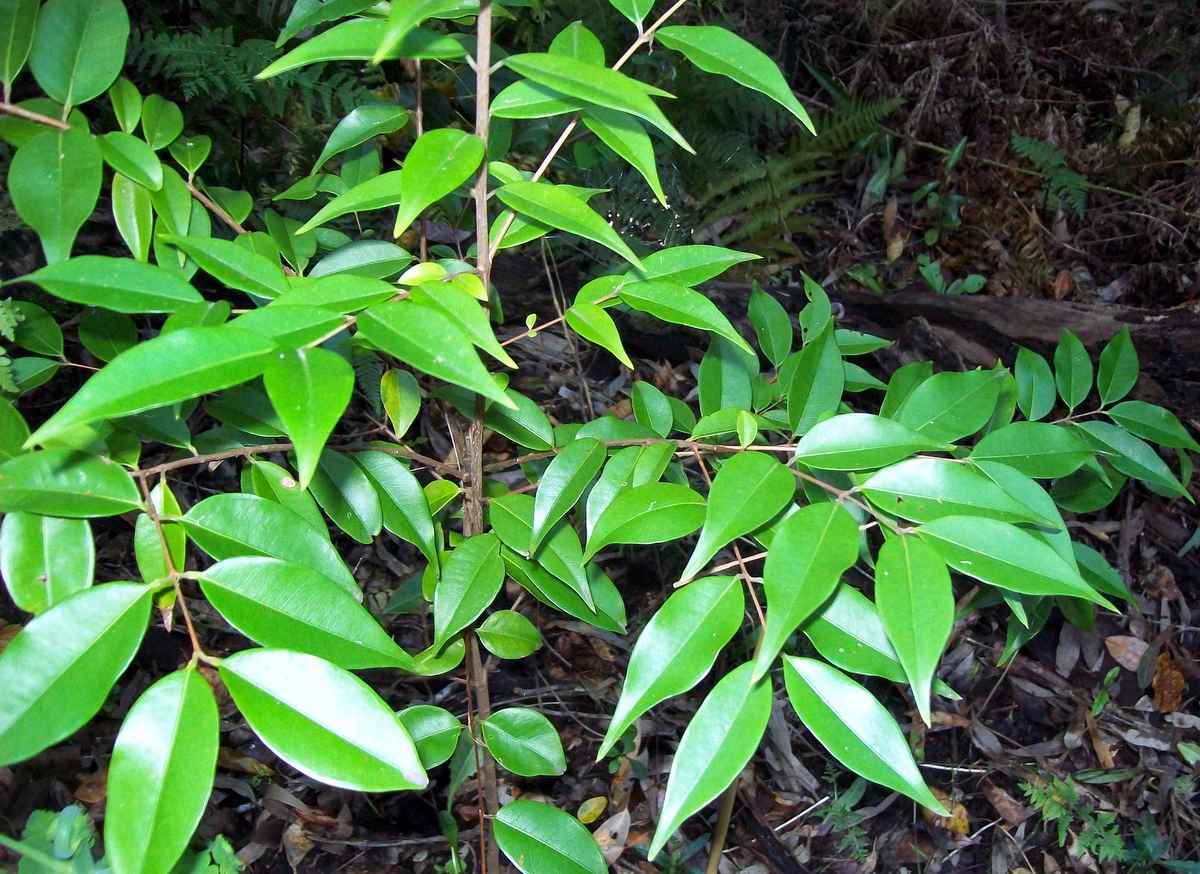

Scientific classification
- Kingdom: Plantae
- Clade: Tracheophytes
- Clade: Angiosperms
- Clade: Eudicots
- Clade: Rosids
- Order: Myrtales
- Family: Myrtaceae
- Subfamily: Myrtoideae
- Tribe: Myrteae
- Genus: Decaspermum; J.R.Forst. & G.Forst.

Synonyms
- Dodecaspermum J.R.Forst. ex Scop.; Nelitris Gaertn.; Pyrenocarpa H.T.Chang & R.H.Miao, not validly published

= Decaspermum =

Genus of flowering plants in the myrtle family

Decaspermum is a genus of the botanical family Myrtaceae, first described as a genus in 1776. It is native to China, Southeast Asia, Queensland, and various islands of the Pacific Ocean.

Species

1. Decaspermum albociliatum – Hainan
2. Decaspermum alpinum – New Guinea
3. Decaspermum arfakense – W New Guinea
4. Decaspermum austrohainanicum – Hainan
5. Decaspermum belense – W New Guinea
6. Decaspermum blancoi – Philippines
7. Decaspermum bracteatum – Sulawesi, Maluku, New Guinea, Bismarcks
8. Decaspermum cryptanthum – Vanua Levu
9. Decaspermum exiguum – Papua New Guinea
10. Decaspermum forbesii – Papua New Guinea
11. Decaspermum fruticosum – Samoa, Tonga, Wallis & Futuna, Society Is
12. Decaspermum glabrum – Guangdong
13. Decaspermum gracilentum – Vietnam, S China
14. Decaspermum hainanense – Hainan
15. Decaspermum humile – New Guinea, N Queensland
16. Decaspermum lanceolatum – Raiatea
17. Decaspermum lorentzii – W New Guinea
18. Decaspermum montanum – Hainan, E Indochina, W Malaysia
19. Decaspermum neoebudicum – Vanuatu
20. Decaspermum neurophyllum – New Guinea
21. Decaspermum nitentifolium – New Guinea
22. Decaspermum nivale – New Guinea
23. Decaspermum parviflorum – China, Assam, SE Asia, Papuasia, Micronesia
24. Decaspermum philippinum – Palawan
25. Decaspermum prunoides – Papua New Guinea
26. Decaspermum raymundi – Micronesia
27. Decaspermum salomonense – Solomon Is
28. Decaspermum struckoilicum – Queensland
29. Decaspermum teretis – Hainan
30. Decaspermum triflorum – Lesser Sunda
31. Decaspermum urvillei – Bismarcks
32. Decaspermum vitiense – Fiji
33. Decaspermum vitis-idaea – Philippines, Sulawesi, Borneo
