= Gracemere, Queensland =

Gracemere
- Town
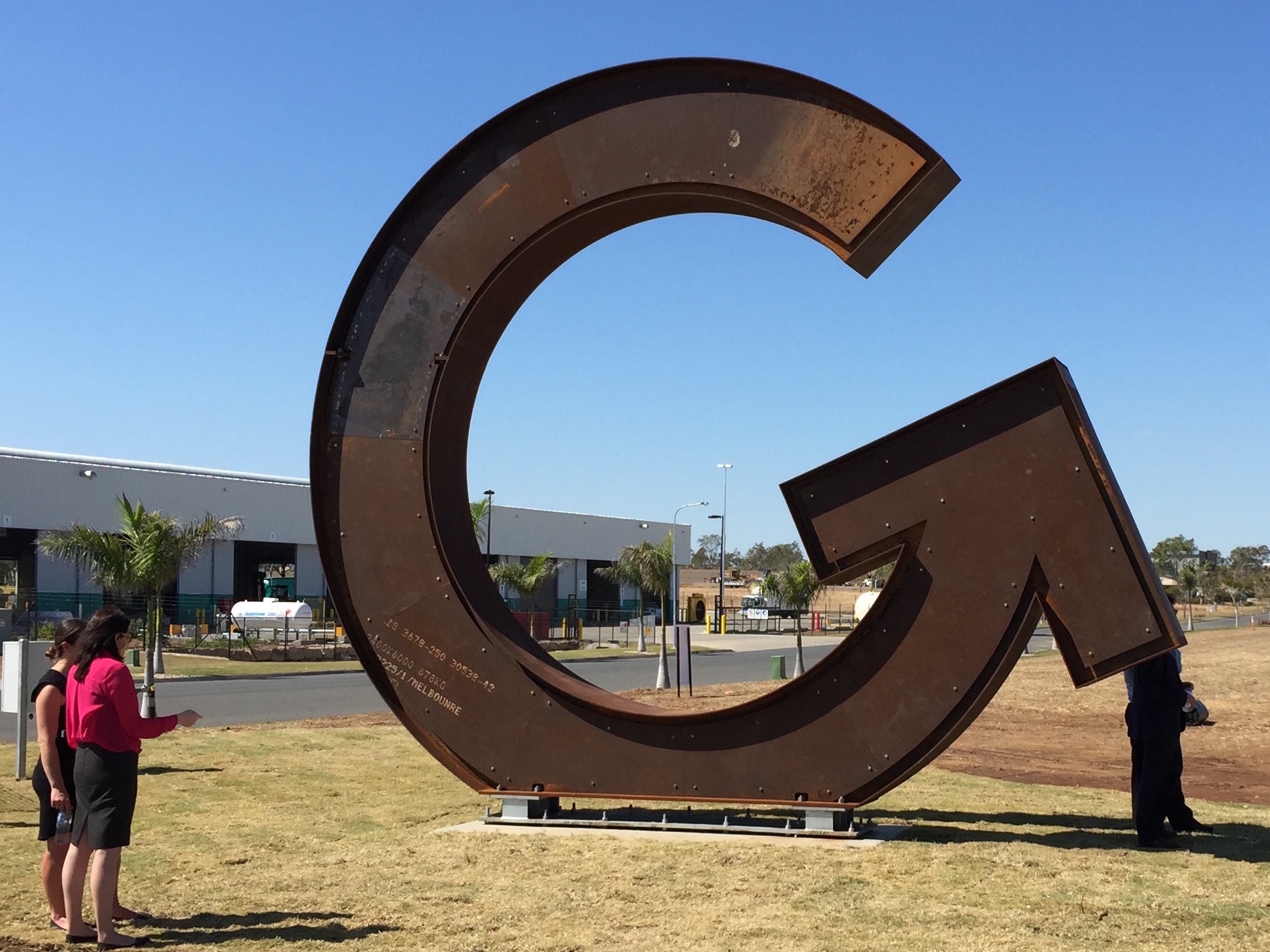
- Big G, Gracemere's big thing, 2015

- Interactive map of Gracemere
- Coordinates: 23.4391°S 150.4558°E
- Country: Australia
- State: Queensland
- LGA: Rockhampton Region
- Location: 11.3 km (7.0 mi) SW of Rockhampton CBD; 636 km (395 mi) NNW of Brisbane

Government
  - State electorates: Rockhampton; Mirani
  - Federal division: Capricornia

Area
  - Total: 70.1 km^{2} (27.1 sq mi)

Population
  - Total: 12,023 (2021 census)
  - Density: 171.51/km^{2} (444.2/sq mi)
- Time zone: UTC+10:00 (AEST)
- Postcode: 4702
Localities around Gracemere
Nine Mile	Fairy Bower	Fairy Bower
Kabra	Gracemere	Port Curtis
Kabra	Bouldercombe	Bouldercombe

Gracemere is a rural town and locality in the Rockhampton Region, Queensland, Australia. In the 2021 census, the locality of Gracemere had a population of 12,023 people.

== Geography ==
Gracemere is approximately 9 kilometres (6 mi) west of the city of Rockhampton. Because of the proximity of the town to Rockhampton, Gracemere has become a dormitory town, with many residents commuting the short distance to work in the city.

Gracemere Lagoon is to the north of the town (23.4316°S 150.4344°E).

The Capricorn Highway enters the locality from the north (Fairy Bower) and exits to the west (Kabra).

The Central Western railway line enters the locality from the north-east (Port Curtis) where it splits from the North Coast railway line. It travels mostly immediately parallel to the highway through the locality exiting to the west (Kabra). There are three railway stops within the locality (from west to east):

- Malchi railway station, now abandoned (23.4528°S 150.4233°E)
- Langley railway station, now abandoned (23.4464°S 150.4366°E)
- Gracemere railway station, once servicing the town, but now abandoned (23.4373°S 150.4523°E)

== History ==
The area was first explored by Europeans in 1853, when the Archer brothers arrived looking for pastures for their sheep. They settled by a small lake, originally called "Farris" or Padgole lagoon which was named Gracemere in 1855. The name Gracemere comes from "Grace", the name of Thomas Archer's wife and "mere" which is a Scottish term for lake. They also located a suitable landing point for supplies on the nearby Fitzroy River, which later became Rockhampton.

In July 1855, Charles and Thomas Archer with around 30 other people including four Native Police troopers, four Aboriginal men from the Burnett River and their wives, left the Archer's Eidsvold pastoral station in order to construct the Gracemere run. The Commissioner for Crown Lands in the Leichhardt region, William Wiseman, joined them to help locate the most appropriate area, and in August 1855 they determined the area next to the current Gracemere lagoon was best. The local Aboriginals led by "King Harold" wished to obtain peaceful conditions with the Archer brothers and in return for allowing the indigenous people to live in the area, the Archer brothers utilised Harold's people to aid in forcibly "restraining the outside blacks" who were resisting British occupation.

Gracemere State School opened on 20 February 1871.

As Gracemere developed as a dormitory town, further schools were needed with Waraburra State School opening on 27 January 1987 and St Paul's Catholic Primary School opening on 27 January 1988.

The Big G was unveiled at the entrance to the Gracemere Industrial Park on 18 August 2015.

Gracemere public library opened in August 2017. It was welcomed by local residents as Gracemere was formerly in the Shire of Fitzroy which had no public libraries.

Gracemere Shoppingworld opened in December 2014 with Woolworths and Best & Less operating as the anchor stores along with up to 20 speciality stores.

In 2019, Gracemere was rapidly expanding with around 10 new housing estates under construction.

== Demographics ==
In the 2011 census, the town of Gracemere had a population of 8,401 people.

In the 2016 census, the locality of Gracemere had a population of 11,315 people.

In the 2021 census, the locality of Gracemere had a population of 12,023 people.

== Heritage listings ==
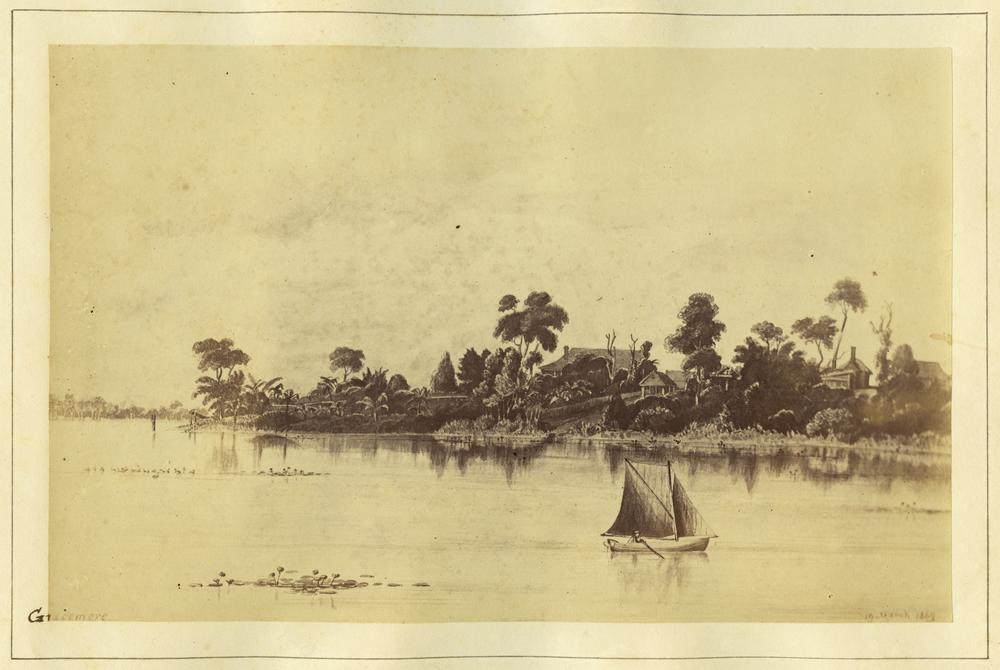
Sketch of Gracemere Homestead and the Gracemere Lagoon, circ 1869

Gracemere has a number of heritage-listed sites, including:

- Gracemere Homestead, 234 Gracemere Road (23.4267°S 150.446°E)

== Economy ==
Gracemere, as a commuter town, has a relatively low level of industry compared to Rockhampton.

Grazing, particularly of beef cattle, has long been the significant industry of the area. The Central Queensland Livestock Exchange (formerly the Gracemere Saleyards) is on the western side of the town. It is the largest cattle sales facility in the Southern Hemisphere and commenced a multimillion-dollar upgrade in 2019. It is at 16 Saleyards Road (23.4427°S 150.4381°E) on a 12.16-hectare (30.0-acre) site.

== Education ==
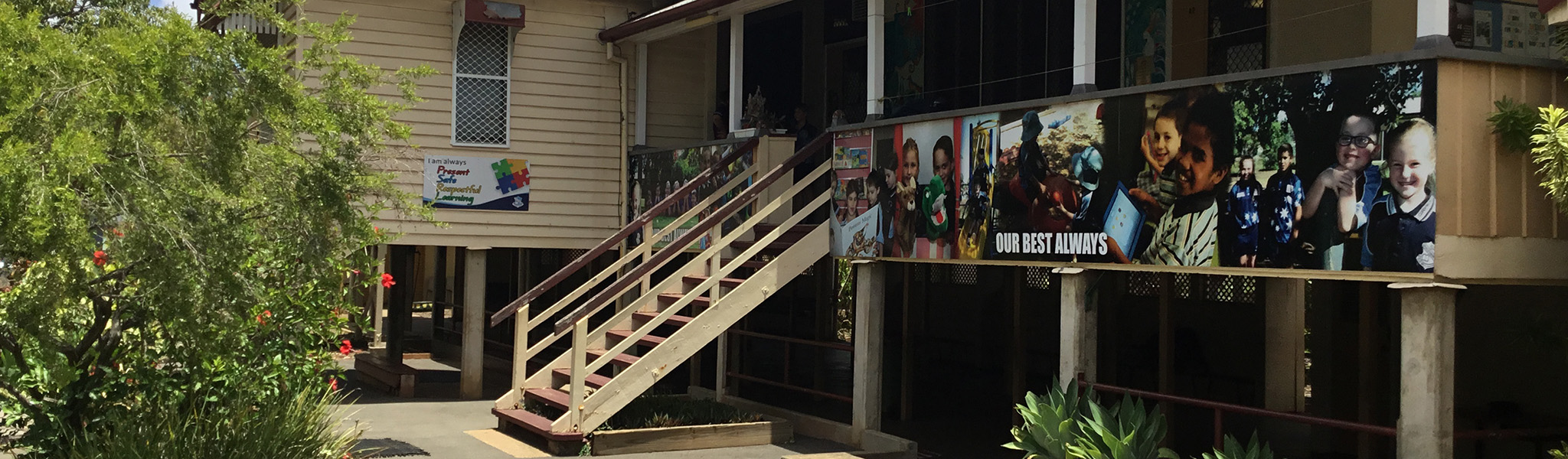
Gracemere State School, 2025

There are three schools servicing Gracemere. They are all primary, one Catholic and two public.

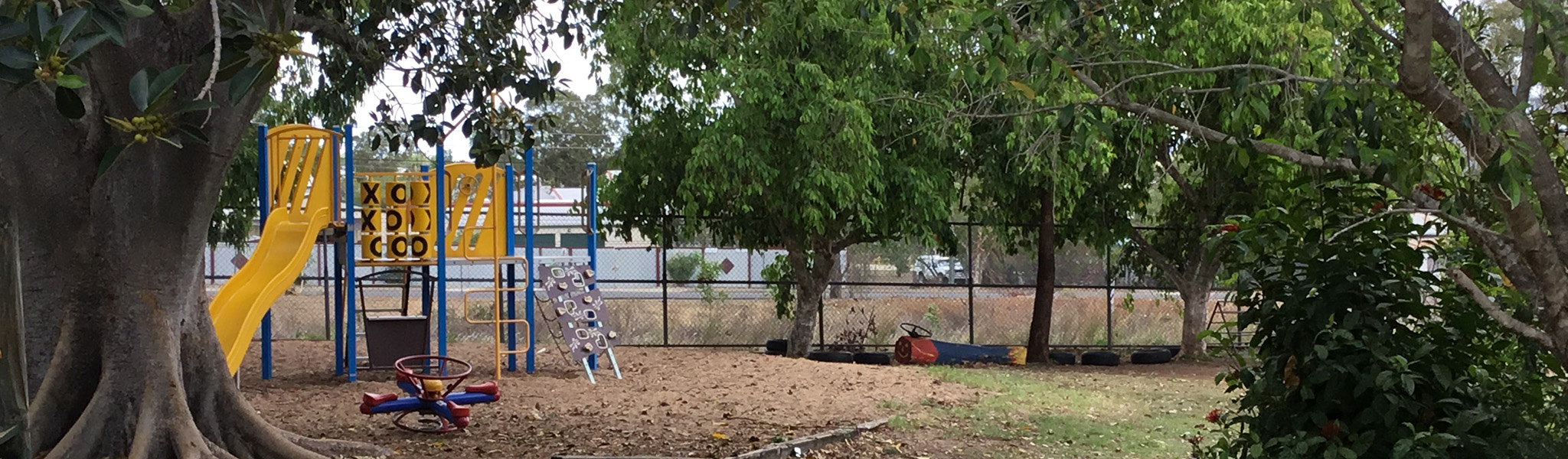
Gracemere State School playground, 2025

Gracemere State School is a government primary (Prep–6) school for boys and girls at 1A O'Shanesy Street (23.4351°S 150.4539°E). In 2017, the school had an enrolment of 302 students with 23 teachers (18 full-time equivalent) and 16 non-teaching staff (11 full-time equivalent). It includes a special education program.

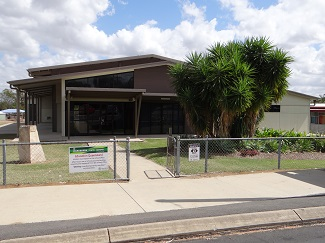
Waraburra State School Hall, 2025

Waraburra State School is a government primary (Prep–6) school for boys and girls at 55 Johnson Road (23.4481°S 150.4526°E). In 2017, the school had an enrolment of 492 students with 34 teachers (33 full-time equivalent) and 24 non-teaching staff (16 full-time equivalent). It includes a special education program.

St Paul's Catholic Primary School is a Catholic primary (Prep–6) school for boys and girls at Breakspear Street (23.4496°S 150.4647°E). In 2017, the school had an enrolment of 310 students with 19 teachers (18 full-time equivalent) and 13 non-teaching staff (8 full-time equivalent).

There are no secondary schools in Gracemere. The nearest government secondary school is Rockhampton State High School in Wandal, Rockhampton. Currently, all high school students travel by a bus service into Rockhampton to continue their senior education.

== Amenities ==
Gracemere Shoppingworld is bounded by O'Shanesy Street, McLaughlin Street and the Capricorn Highway (23.4337°S 150.4533°E).

The Rockhampton Regional Council operate a public library in Gracemere at 1 Ranger Street (23.4399°S 150.4575°E).

The Gracemere branch of the Queensland Country Women's Association meets at the Guide Hut in James Street.

== Attractions ==
The entrance to the Gracemere Industrial Park has the Big G, one of Australia's big things. It is in the shape of a capital letter G and is 5 by 6.6 metres (16 by 22 ft) in size and is made from 5 tonnes (5.5 tons) of mild steel. It is on the southern corner of Somerset Road and Enterprise Drive (23.4553°S 150.4209°E).

== Transport ==
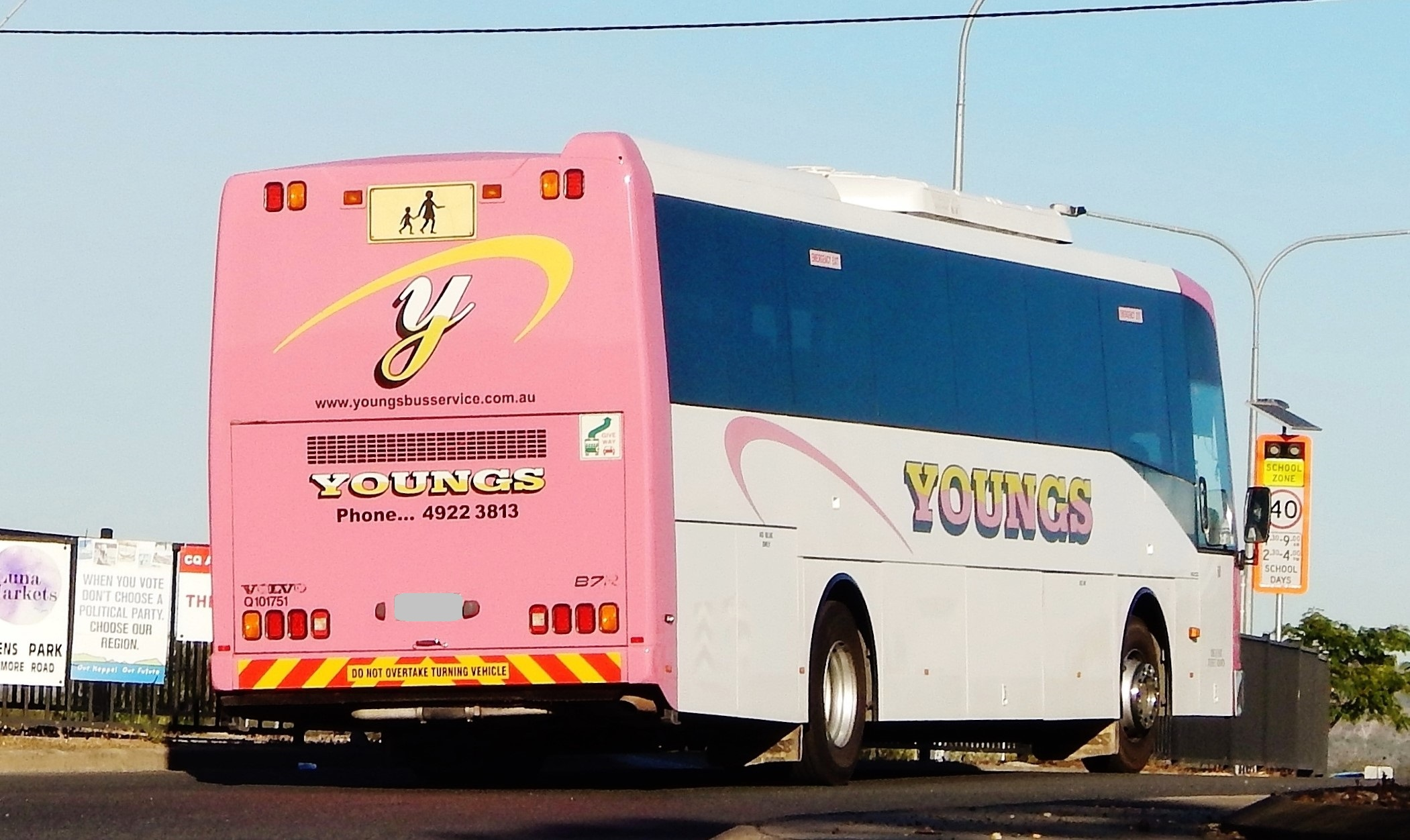
Youngs bus

As a dormitory town, most Gracemerians either drive a private vehicle or catch a bus to the city. The bus service, Young's Bus Service, operates hourly between the town centre and South Gracemere. Traffic can peak at around 8:00 in the morning, with traffic being banked up for around 1-1.5 kilometres on weekdays. Infrastructure problems are now becoming a reality for the small town and surrounding Capricorn Highway towns. This has resulted in constant roadworks and upgrades of the highway road quality. This mass influx of vehicles has resulted in a proposal for a new western bypass for Rockhampton, to send vehicles right to the northern suburbs, avoiding inner city congestion and delay, as this is where many Gracemerians work.

== Notable residents ==
- Anna Meares – OAM and twice gold medallist at the Commonwealth Games and Olympic Games
- Kerrie Meares – Twice gold medallist at the Commonwealth Games for cycling. She is the older sister of Anna Meares
