= Bouldercombe =

- Town
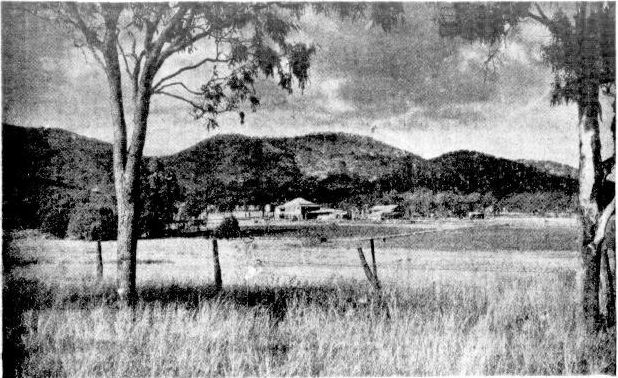
- Bouldercombe and the Dee Range, 1954

- Interactive map of Bouldercombe
- Coordinates: 23.5767°S 150.4671°E
- Country: Australia
- State: Queensland
- LGA: Rockhampton Region
- Location: 16.2 km (10.1 mi) NE of Mount Morgan; 17.6 km (10.9 mi) S of Gracemere; 23.3 km (14.5 mi) SSW of Rockhampton; 618 km (384 mi) NNW of Brisbane

Government
  - State electorates: Mirani; Rockhampton
  - Federal division: Flynn

Area
  - Total: 160.8 km^{2} (62.1 sq mi)

Population
  - Total: 1,117 (2021 census)
  - Density: 6.947/km^{2} (17.991/sq mi)
- Time zone: UTC+10:00 (AEST)
- Postcode: 4702
Localities around Bouldercombe
Kabra	Gracemere	Port Curtis
Stanwell	Bouldercombe	Midgee
The Mine; Moongan	Leydens Hill; Struck Oil	Bajool

Bouldercombe is a rural town and locality in the Rockhampton Region, Queensland, Australia. In the 2021 census, the locality of Bouldercombe had a population of 1,117 people.

== Geography ==
Bouldercombe is in Central Queensland. The town is on the Burnett Highway, 636 kilometres (395 mi) north west of the state capital, Brisbane and 22 kilometres (14 mi) south of the regional centre of Rockhampton.

There are a number of neighbourhoods within the locality:

- Bundaleer (23.55°S 150.3833°E)
- Dee Rush (23.6°S 150.4666°E)
- Moonmera (23.5833°S 150.4°E)
- Mount Usher (23.6°S 150.4666°E)
- Peters Rush (23.6°S 150.4666°E)

== History ==
Bouldercombe came into existence in 1865 when gold was found at nearby Crocodile Creek and Gavial Creek. Within a year over 2000 miners were living in the area. The town was originally called Crocodile after the creek name.

Crocodile Creek Post Office opened on 24 September 1866 and closed in 1879.

Land sales occurred in 1867.

Crocodile Creek Provisional School opened on 14 August 1871. It was later closed and reopened on 15 August 1881. It was later relocated to a new building at Bouldercombe. On 23 February 1900 it was renamed Bouldercombe State School.

By 1876, the gold rush was over and the population slumped to 149, but the discovery of gold at nearby Mount Usher in 1897 caused the population to rise to over 1000 people for a short time.

The first Bouldercombe Post Office opened on 7 September 1883 and closed in 1889.

The Royal Hotel opened on the corner of Mount Usher Road and Oleander Street on 5 March 1897 under licensee Samuel Heiser; the hotel is still operating in 2014.

Mount Usher Receiving Office opened by 1899, was raised to post office status in 1900, closed in 1906, reopened in 1909, was reduced in status in 1913, was renamed Bouldercombe in 1924 and closed in 1927.

The former Dawson Valley railway line passed through the locality with the following stations (now abandoned):

- Bundaleer railway station (23.5521°S 150.3814°E)
- Moonmera railway station (23.5630°S 150.3882°E)

The name of the neighbourhood Moonmera derives the railway station. It is an Aboriginal word meaning bottom of the hill.

Moonmera Provisional School opened in 1900. On 1 January 1909, it became Moonmera State School. It closed in 1950.

Mount Usher Methodist Church opened on Sunday 10 November 1901. It was on a quarter-acre block immediately opposite the pumping plant. It was 30 by 24 feet (9.1 by 7.3 m) and 14 feet (4.3 m) high with a porch. The doors and windows were in Gothic style. It was designed and built by carpenter George Nathaniel Delahunt at a cost of £142 17s.

The third Bouldercombe Post Office opened on 28 August 1928 and closed in 1977.

The Crocodile Creek Gold Dredging Company started up in 1935 to extract gold by alluvial washing and operated until 1946.

Since that time, the area has mainly been known for its citrus growing.

In 1976, a brickworks was established.

== Demographics ==
In the 2011 census, the town of Bouldercombe had a population of 698 people.

In the 2016 census, the locality of Bouldercombe had a population of 1,085 people.

In the 2021 census, the locality of Bouldercombe had a population of 1,117 people.

== Education ==
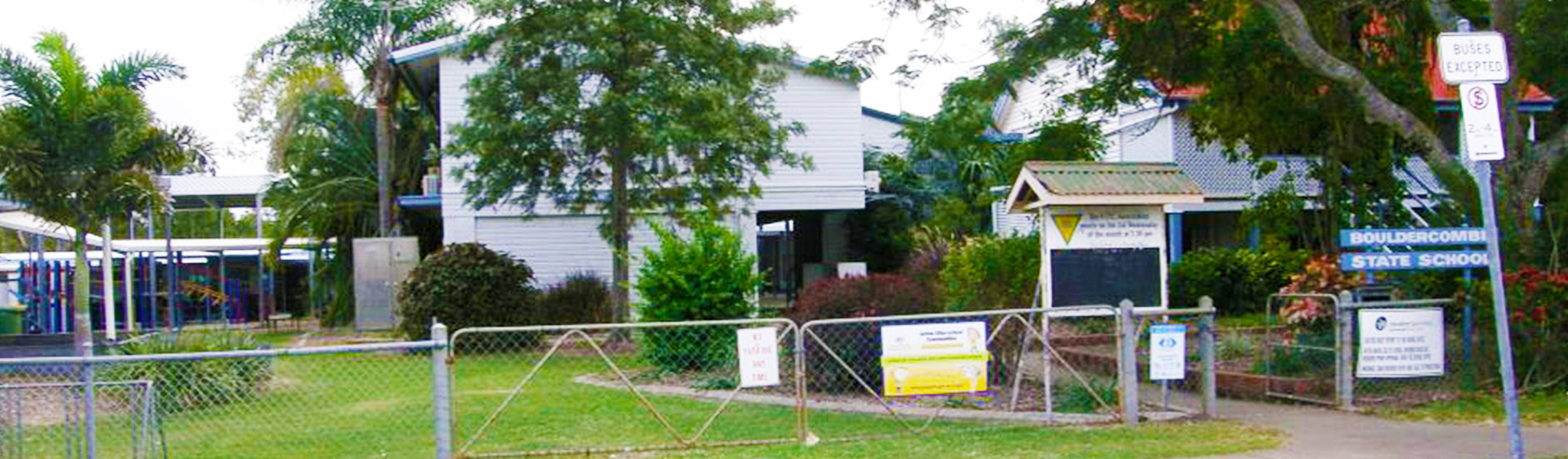
Bouldercombe State School, 2021

Bouldercombe State School is a government primary (Prep-6) school for boys and girls at 52599 Burnett Highway (23.5641°S 150.4717°E). In 2017, the school had an enrolment of 123 students with 7 teachers (6 full-time equivalent) and 6 non-teaching staff (3 full-time equivalent).

There is no secondary school in Bouldercombe. The nearest government secondary schools are Mount Morgan State High School in Mount Morgan to the south and Rockhampton State High School in Wandal, Rockhampton, to the north.

== Tourism ==
Bouldercombe is the gateway to the Bouldercombe Gorge Resources Reserve, including Bouldercombe Falls.

The Bicentennial National Trail passes through Bouldercombe.
