= Leydens Hill, Queensland =

Leydens Hill
- Suburb
- Interactive map of Leydens Hill
- Coordinates: 23.6108°S 150.4122°E
- Country: Australia
- State: Queensland
- LGA: Rockhampton Region
- Location: 6.6 km (4.1 mi) NE of Mount Morgan; 33.3 km (20.7 mi) SSW of Rockhampton CBD; 652 km (405 mi) NNW of Brisbane

Government
  - State electorate: Mirani
  - Federal division: Flynn

Area
  - Total: 4.3 km^{2} (1.7 sq mi)

Population
  - Total: 0 (2021 census)
  - Density: 0.00/km^{2} (0.00/sq mi)
- Time zone: UTC+10:00 (AEST)
- Postcode: 4714
Suburbs around Leydens Hill
Moongan	Bouldercombe	Bouldercombe
Moongan	Leydens Hill	Struck Oil
Baree	Mount Morgan	Johnsons Hill

Leydens Hill is a rural locality in the Rockhampton Region, Queensland, Australia. In the 2021 census, Leydens Hill had "no people or a very low population".

== Geography ==
The Burnett Highway runs along part of the eastern boundary before passing through the eastern end to the run along the southern boundary.

== Demographics ==
In the 2016 census, Leydens Hill had "no people or a very low population".

In the 2021 census, Leydens Hill had "no people or a very low population".

== Education ==
There are no schools in Leydens Hill. The nearest government primary and secondary schools are Mount Morgan Central State School and Mount Morgan State High School, both in neighbouring Mount Morgan to the south-west.
