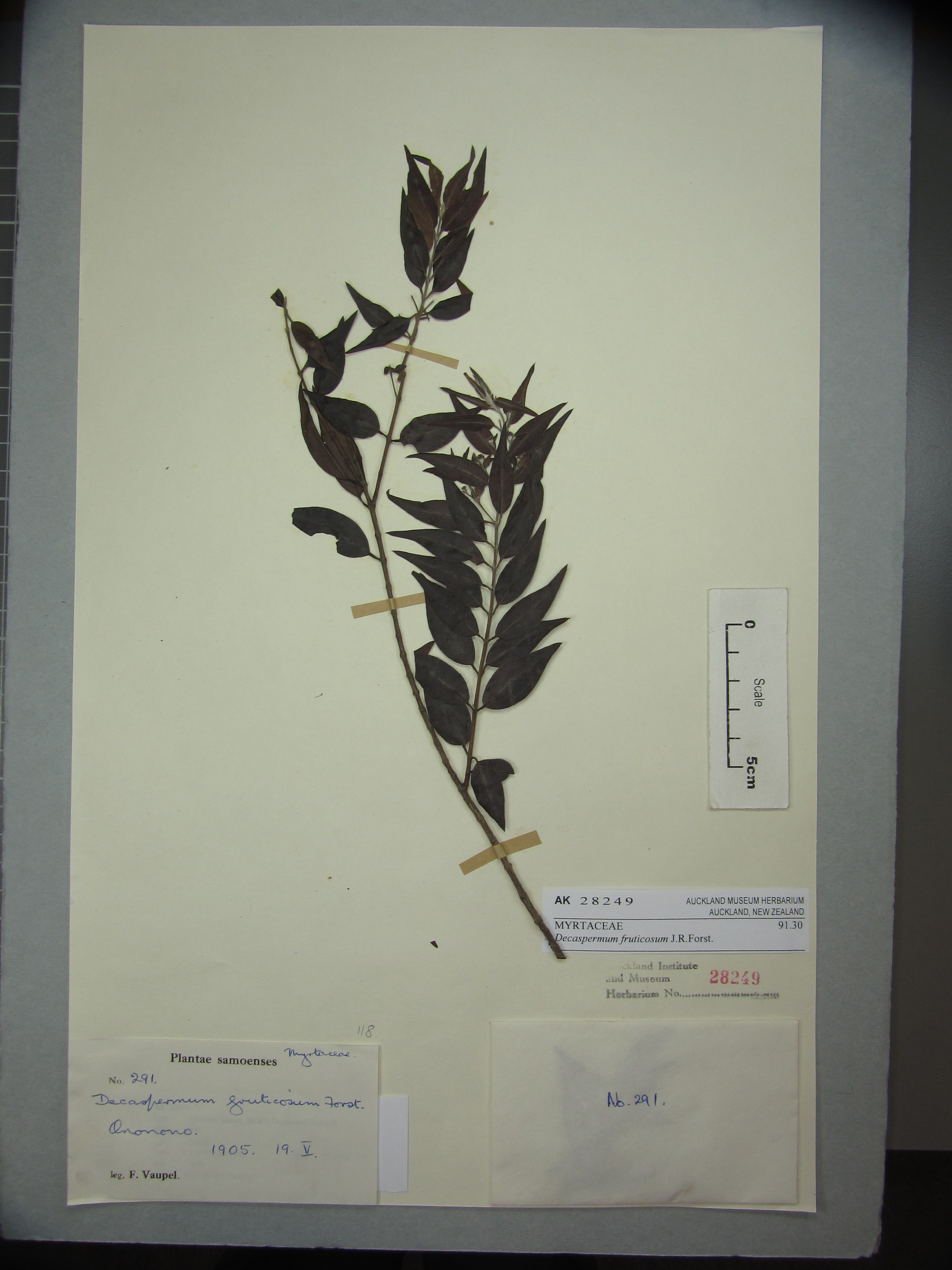

Conservation status
- Least Concern (IUCN 3.1)

Scientific classification
- Kingdom: Plantae
- Clade: Embryophytes
- Clade: Tracheophytes
- Clade: Angiosperms
- Clade: Eudicots
- Clade: Rosids
- Order: Myrtales
- Family: Myrtaceae
- Genus: Decaspermum
- Species: D. fruticosum

Binomial name
- Decaspermum fruticosum J.R.Forst. & G.Forst. (1776)

Synonyms
- Decaspermum forsteri Seem. (1866), nom. superfl.; Nelitris forsteri Seem. (1866), nom. illeg.; Nelitris fruticosa (J.R.Forst. & G.Forst.) A.Gray (1854); Nelitris jambosella Gaertn. (1788), nom. illeg.; Psidium decaspermum L.f. (1782), nom. illeg.

= Decaspermum fruticosum =

Species of flowering plant

Decaspermum fruticosum is a species of flowering plant in the myrtle family, Myrtaceae. It is a tree or shrub native to the Samoan Islands, Society Islands, Tonga, and Wallis and Futuna.
