= Struck Oil, Queensland =

Struck Oil
- Suburb
- Interactive map of Struck Oil
- Coordinates: 23.6125°S 150.4463°E
- Country: Australia
- State: Queensland
- LGA: Rockhampton Region
- Location: 9.3 km (5.8 mi) ENE of Mount Morgan; 36.5 km (22.7 mi) SSW of Rockhampton; 661 km (411 mi) NNW of Brisbane

Government
  - State electorate: Mirani
  - Federal division: Flynn

Area
  - Total: 21.0 km^{2} (8.1 sq mi)

Population
  - Total: 151 (2021 census)
  - Density: 7.19/km^{2} (18.62/sq mi)
- Time zone: UTC+10:00 (AEST)
- Postcode: 4714
Suburbs around Struck Oil
Bouldercombe	Bouldercombe	Bouldercombe
Leydens Hill; Johnsons Hill	Struck Oil	Bouldercombe
Mount Morgan	Limestone	Bajool

Struck Oil is a rural locality in the Rockhampton Region, Queensland, Australia. In the 2021 census, Struck Oil had a population of 151 people.

== History ==
The place was named after the play Struck Oil.

Struck Oil Provisional School opened in 1905. On 1 March 1911, it became Struck Oil State School. It closed circa 1944. It was on the south side of Struck Oil Road (approx 23.61226°S 150.45112°E).

== Demographics ==
In the 2016 census, Struck Oil had a population of 179 people.

In the 2021 census, Struck Oil had a population of 151 people.

== Education ==
There are no schools in Struck Oil. The nearest government primary school is Mount Morgan Central State School in neighbouring Mount Morganto the south-west. The nearest government secondary school is Mount Morgan State High School, also in Mount Morgan.

== Flora ==
Decaspermum struckoilicum is a critically endangered plant species in the myrtaceous family which only occurs in Struck Oil and nearby areas within the Bouldercombe Resource Reserve and Bouldercombe Conservation Park.
