= Decaspermum struckoilicum =

Conservation status
- Critically endangered (EPBC Act)

Scientific classification
- Kingdom: Plantae
- Clade: Embryophytes
- Clade: Tracheophytes
- Clade: Angiosperms
- Clade: Eudicots
- Clade: Rosids
- Order: Myrtales
- Family: Myrtaceae
- Genus: Decaspermum
- Species: D. struckoilicum

Binomial name
- Decaspermum struckoilicum N.Snow & Guymer

Species of shrub

Decaspermum struckoilicum is a rare and critically endangered perennial shrub in the Myrtaceae family which is endemic to Queensland.

== Phenology ==
Flowering has been observed in October and November with fruiting in December to January.

== Distribution and habitat ==
Decaspermum struckoilicum possesses a very restricted range only occurring in five locations in Struck Oil at Mount Morgan in Central Queensland. It occurs in semi-evergreen vine thicket on reddish-brown soil up to 300 m in elevation from sea level. It also occurs in Bouldercombe Gorge Resources Reserve. The species as a whole consists of a single subpopulation of 41 mature individuals. Extensive searches in the surrounding area have not detected new mature individuals or populations.

== Conservation status ==
Decaspermum struckoilicum is listed as "critically endangered" under the Queensland Nature Conservation Act 1992 and under the Australian Government Environment Protection and Biodiversity Conservation Act 1999.

== Threats ==
In the past the species has been affected by land clearing causing fragmentation of available habitat. Prior to the Queensland Vegetation Management Act 1999 (VMA), small scale agriculture was the main driver of habitat destruction within the species distribution. Today, majority of the 41 known individuals (80%) occur on private property (freehold tenure). Some of the species distribution range which occurs on freehold land are mapped as remnant whereas other areas are mapped as non-remnant. Areas of non-remnant vegetation are able to be cleared for mining, urban development, and agriculture and are not protection under the VMA. Protected remnant vegetation is vulnerable to illegal clearing.

Individuals in the past are likely to have been lost or have their habitat degraded by mining activities. Currently, are two mineral exploration permits which cover the species distribution.

Decaspermum struckoilicum occurs in fire-sensitive semi-evergreen vine thicket vegetation communities surrounded by eucalyptus forests on slopes and ridgelines. Repeated hot fires have the potential to kill mature individuals and the surrounding vine thicket species. The invasion of grasses and invasive weed species such as Lantana camara, Megathyrsus maximus, Cryptostegia grandiflora increases the likelihood of hotter fires through competition while decreasing the chances of resprouting and regeneration post-fire.

Introduction pathogens such as Austropuccinia psidii (Myrtle Rust) is a major concern for this species. It is able to infect new shoots causing dieback and infect fruit and flowers causing a reduced capacity to regenerate and allow for new recruitment.
