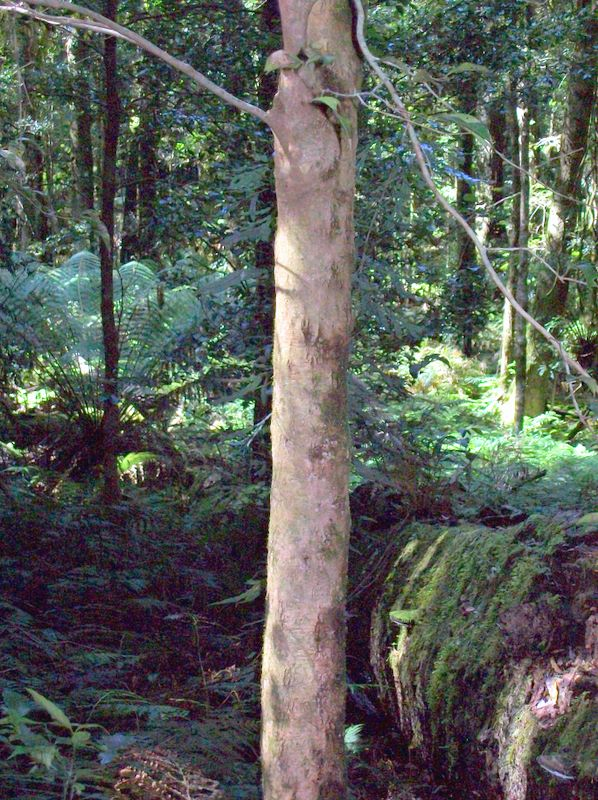
- Scrub ironwood at Barrington Tops National Park, Australia

Scientific classification
- Kingdom: Plantae
- Clade: Tracheophytes
- Clade: Angiosperms
- Clade: Eudicots
- Clade: Rosids
- Order: Myrtales
- Family: Myrtaceae
- Genus: Gossia
- Species: G. acmenoides

Binomial name
- Gossia acmenoides (F.Muell.) N.Snow & Guymer

Synonyms
- Myrtus acmenoides F.Muell.; Austromyrtus acmenoides F.Muell. Burret

= Gossia acmenoides =

Scrub ironwood

Species of tree

Gossia acmenoides, known as the scrub ironwood, is a rainforest tree of the family Myrtaceae, native to eastern Australia. The usual habitat of this small tree is drier rainforest areas. The range of natural distribution is from Jamberoo in New South Wales to Eungella National Park in northern Queensland.

The generic name Gossia refers to the former premier of Queensland, Wayne Goss, who was a champion of conservation. The specific epithet acmenoides means that this type of tree resembles plants of the genus Acmena (many of which have been transferred to the genus Syzygium). The leaves of this plant resemble the lillypilly Syzygium smithii.

== Taxonomy ==
The species was first described in 1859 as Myrtus acmenoides by Ferdinand von Mueller, but was transferred in 2003 to the genus, Gossia, by Neil Snow, Gordon Guymer and Sawvel.

== Description ==
Scrub ironwood is a small-sized tree or shrub, usually around 8 metres (25 ft) tall. The trunk is often multi-stemmed and crooked. The largest individuals are around 20 metres (60 ft) tall, with a trunk diameter of 30 cm (12 in). The trunk is mostly not cylindrical, and the fawn-coloured bark is smooth and pale, showing occasional darker chocolate-coloured patches on the trunk. The outer bark has thin, paper-like fragments, while the branchlets are smooth and brown.

Leaves are opposite on the stem, simple and not toothed, 2.5 to 7.5 cm (1–3 in) long, and 1 to 3.5 cm (0.4-1.4 in) wide. Oil dots are few, but large and irregularly scattered and are visible by a lens or the naked eye. The mid rib is raised on the upper and lower surfaces of the leaf. A distinct intramarginal vein can be seen around the edge of the leaf.

Small white flowers appear from November to April. The fruit is a small black berry, with three to five seeds, maturing from February to April. Regeneration from seeds or cuttings is not easily achieved.
