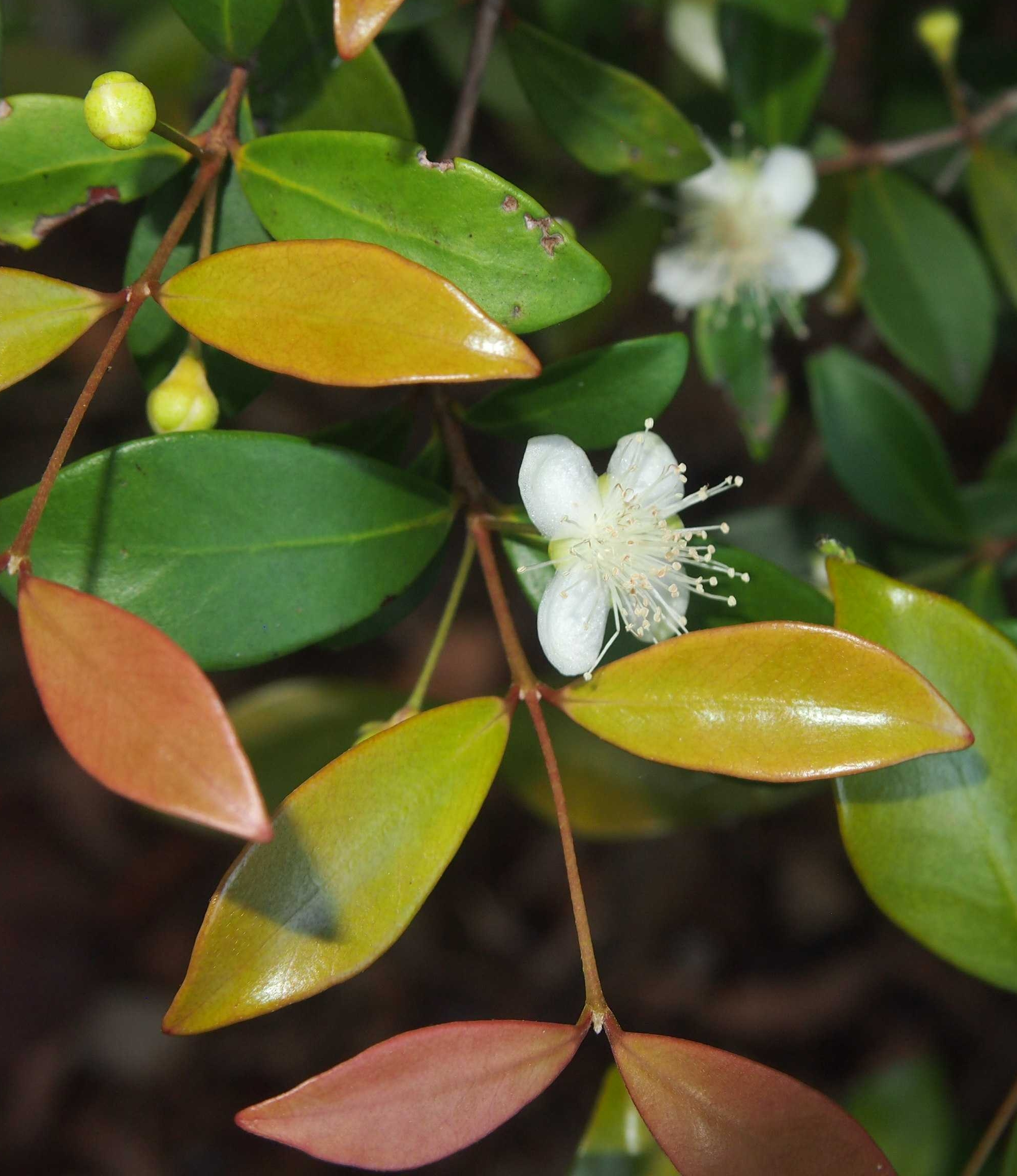
- Gossia bidwillii flower and foliage

Scientific classification
- Kingdom: Plantae
- Clade: Tracheophytes
- Clade: Angiosperms
- Clade: Eudicots
- Clade: Rosids
- Order: Myrtales
- Family: Myrtaceae
- Genus: Gossia
- Species: G. bidwillii

Binomial name
- Gossia bidwillii (Benth.) N.Snow & Guymer

Synonyms
- Austromyrtus racemulosa Burret; Austromyrtus bidwillii (Benth.) Burret

= Gossia bidwillii =

Python tree

Species of tree

Gossia bidwillii, known as the python tree is a rainforest myrtle of eastern Australia. The usual habitat is the drier rainforest areas. The range of natural distribution is from the Hunter River (32° S) in New South Wales to Coen (13° S) in far northern Queensland.

Other common names include lignum-vitae, scrub ironwood and smooth-barked ironwood.

== Taxonomy ==
The species was first described in 1867 by George Bentham as Myrtus bidwillii, but in 2003 was transferred to the genus, Gossia, by Neil Snow, Gordon Guymer and Sawvel.

== Description ==
A medium-sized tree, usually around 18 to 25 metres tall and up to 20 cm in trunk diameter. The trunk is crooked and not cylindrical, the bark being smooth and orange/brown in colour with attractive green blotchy markings. Hence the common name of Python Tree. The bark sheds in thin papery flakes.

Branchlets are smooth and brown. The leaves are opposite, simple and not toothed, being 5 to 8 cm long. Elliptic to ovate in shape with a leaf stem 3 to 6 mm long. Oil dots prominent when viewed with a lens, the leaf has a faint eucalyptus smell. Leaf venation evident, with a raised midrib on both sides, and an intramarginal vein around the leaf edge.

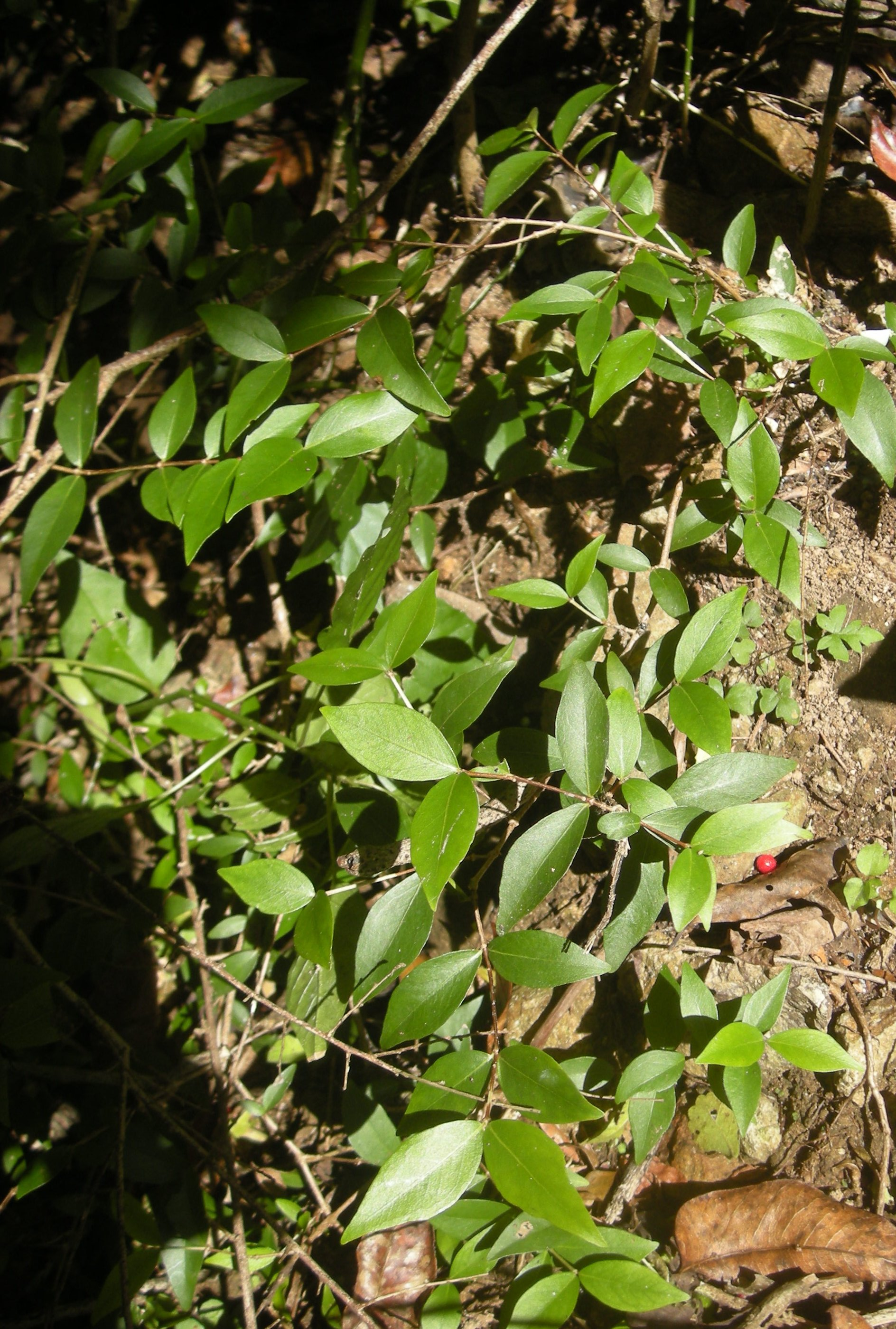
G. bidwillii.jpgseedlings

White, scented flowers form between October and December. The fruit is a black berry. Flattened and warty, 6 mm in diameter. Inside are 3 to 5 attractive mauve coloured seeds. Fruit matures from January to May, eaten by various birds including the Rose crowned fruit dove.

== Hyperaccumulation ==
Gossia bidwilii is Australia's first recorded hyperaccumulator. The tree accumulates excessively high levels of manganese (Mn) into its above ground biomass as an adaptation from high levels of manganese present in the soil.

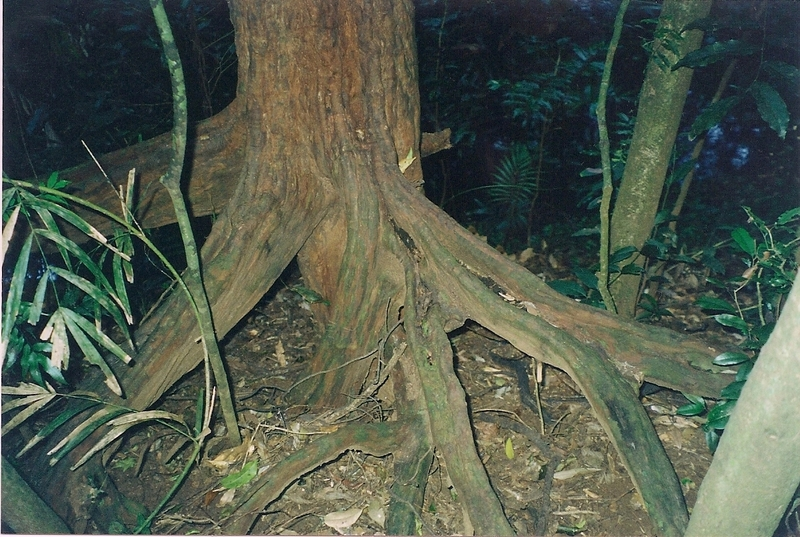
exposed roots of a Python Tree at Booyong Flora Reserve, Australia
