= Captain Creek, Queensland =

Captain Creek
- Suburb
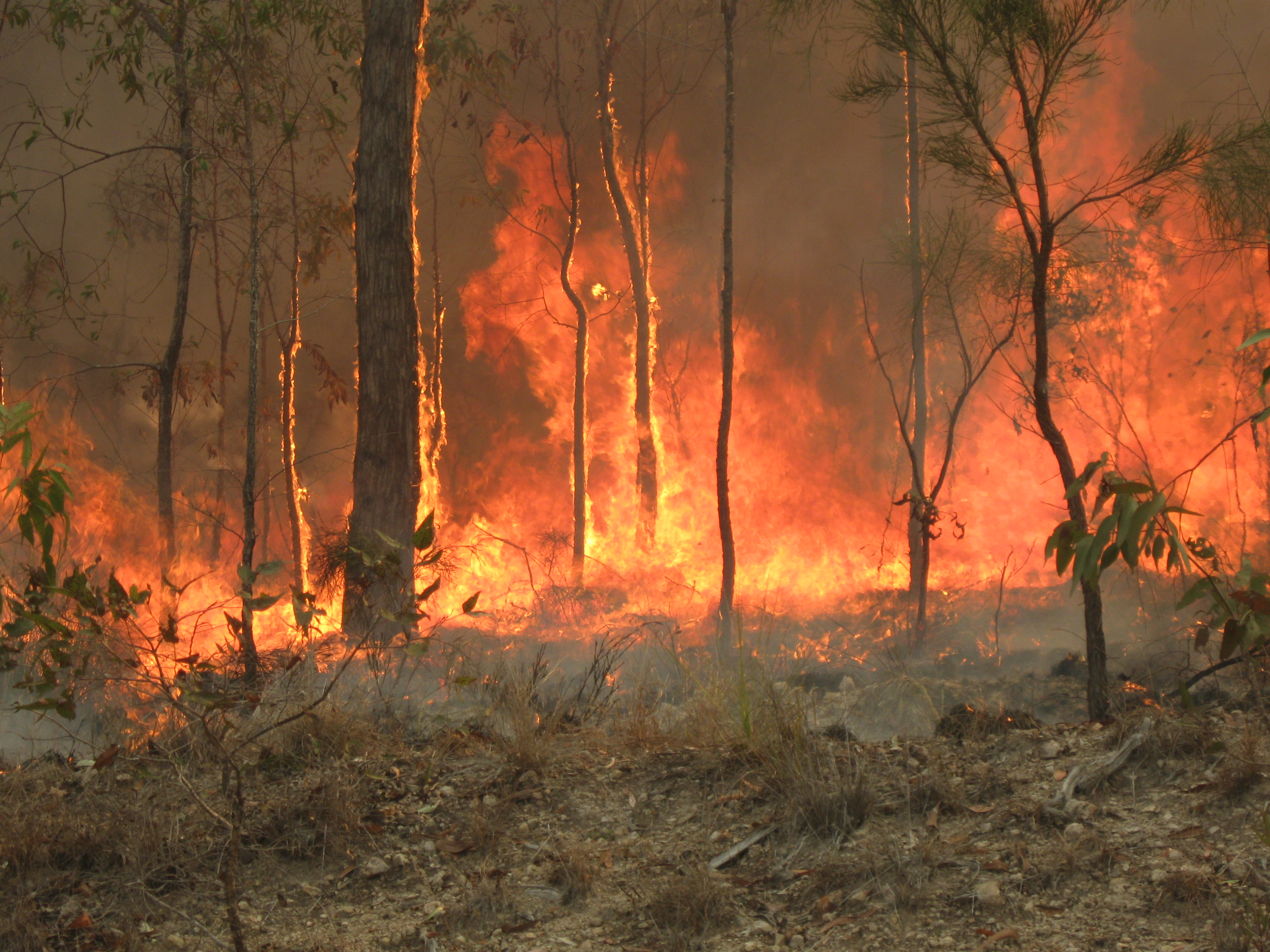
- Bush fire at Captain Creek, 2010

- Interactive map of Captain Creek
- Coordinates: 24.2861°S 151.7791°E
- Country: Australia
- State: Queensland
- LGA: Gladstone Region
- Location: 21.3 km (13.2 mi) WSW of Agnes Water; 53.2 km (33.1 mi) NNW of Rosedale; 112 km (70 mi) SSE of Gladstone; 213 km (132 mi) SE of Rockhampton; 478 km (297 mi) NNW of Brisbane

Government
  - State electorate: Burnett
  - Federal division: Flynn

Area
  - Total: 141.7 km^{2} (54.7 sq mi)

Population
  - Total: 452 (2021 census)
  - Density: 3.190/km^{2} (8.262/sq mi)
- Time zone: UTC+10:00 (AEST)
- Postcode: 4677
Suburbs around Captain Creek
Eurimbula	Eurimbula	Round Hill
Mount Tom	Captain Creek	Round Hill
Mount Tom	Mount Tom	Taunton

Captain Creek is a rural locality in the Gladstone Region, Queensland, Australia. In the 2021 census, Captain Creek had a population of 452 people.

== Geography ==
The predominant land use is grazing on native vegetation, but rural residential housing is increasing.

== History ==
The locality presumably takes its name from the creek which rises in the north of the locality and is a tributary of Oyster Creek which exits to the south-west to Taunton and Round Hill. It is ultimately a tributary of Baffle Creek which enters the Coral Sea between the localities of Rules Beach and Mullet Creek.

== Demographics ==
In the 2016 census, Captain Creek had a population of 358 people.

In the 2021 census, Captain Creek had a population of 452 people.

== Education ==
There are no schools in Captain Creek. The nearest government primary school is Agnes Water State School in Agnes Water to the north-east. The nearest government secondary schools are Miriam Vale State School (to Year 10) in neighbouring Miriam Vale to the west and Rosedale State School (to Year 12) in Rosedale to the south-east.
