= Mount Tom, Queensland =

Mount Tom
- Suburb
- Interactive map of Mount Tom
- Coordinates: 24.3333°S 151.6805°E
- Country: Australia
- State: Queensland
- LGA: Gladstone Region
- Location: 14.6 km (9.1 mi) SE of Miriam Vale; 46.6 km (29.0 mi) NNW of Rosedale; 65.1 km (40.5 mi) SSE of Tannum Sands; 83.2 km (51.7 mi) SSE of Gladstone CBD; 455 km (283 mi) N of Brisbane

Government
  - State electorate: Burnett
  - Federal division: Flynn

Area
  - Total: 276.2 km^{2} (106.6 sq mi)
- Elevation: 23–474 m (75–1,555 ft)

Population
  - Total: 44 (2021 census)
  - Density: 0.1593/km^{2} (0.413/sq mi)
- Time zone: UTC+10:00 (AEST)
- Postcode: 4677
Suburbs around Mount Tom
Bororen	Eurimbula	Captain Creek
Miriam Vale	Mount Tom	Captain Creek
Colosseum	Colosseum	Taunton

Mount Tom is a rural locality in the Gladstone Region, Queensland, Australia. In the 2021 census, Mount Tom had a population of 44 people.

== Geography ==
Baffle Creek enters the locality from the north (Eurimbula) and flows south, forming parts of the south-western boundary of the locality before exiting to the south-east (Taunton).

The locality has the following mountains (from north to south):

- Dromedary Mountain (24.3183°S 151.7016°E) 474 metres (1,555 ft)
- Mount Tom (24.3604°S 151.6842°E) 259 metres (850 ft)
- North Gwynne (24.4081°S 151.7380°E) 398 metres (1,306 ft)

The land use is predominantly grazing on native vegetation.

== Demographics ==
In the 2016 census, Mount Tom had a population of 43 people.

In the 2021 census, Mount Tom had a population of 44 people.

== Education ==
There are no schools in Mount Tom. The nearest government primary schools are Miriam Vale State School in neighbouring Miriam Vale to the west, Agnes Water State School in Agnes Water to the north-east, and Lowmead State School in Lowmead to the south. The nearest government secondary schools are Miriam Vale State School (to Year 10), Tannum Sands State High School (to Year 12) in Tannum Sands to the north-east, and Rosedale State School (to Year 12) in Rosedale to the south-east. However, some areas in Mount Tom might be too distant for a daily commute to the schools offering Year 12; the alternatives are distance education and boarding school.
