= Round Hill, Queensland =

Round Hill
- Suburb
- Interactive map of Round Hill
- Coordinates: 24.2763°S 151.8833°E
- Country: Australia
- State: Queensland
- LGA: Gladstone Region
- Location: 5.5 km (3.4 mi) E of Miriam Vale; 60.4 km (37.5 mi) N of Rosedale; 117 km (73 mi) NNW of Bundaberg; 119 km (74 mi) SE of Gladstone CBD; 470 km (290 mi) N of Brisbane

Government
  - State electorate: Burnett
  - Federal division: Flynn

Area
  - Total: 143.7 km^{2} (55.5 sq mi)

Population
  - Total: 189 (2021 census)
  - Density: 1.315/km^{2} (3.406/sq mi)
- Time zone: UTC+10:00 (AEST)
- Postcode: 4677
Suburbs around Round Hill
Eurimbula	Agnes Water	Agnes Water
Captain Creek	Round Hill	Deepwater
Taunton	Oyster Creek	Deepwater

Round Hill is a rural locality in the Gladstone Region, Queensland, Australia. In the 2021 census, Round Hill had a population of 189 people.

== Geography ==
Oyster Creek forms part of the western boundary, while Round Hill Creek forms part of the north-western boundary.

The locality has the following mountains:

- Camelback (24.2677°S 151.9231°E) rising to 97 metres (318 ft) above sea level
- Round Hill (24.2573°S 151.8890°E) rising 286 metres (938 ft) above sea level

Round Hill Road enters the locality from the west (Captain Creek) and exits to the north (Agnes Water).

A section of Deepwater National Park is in the north-east of the locality. Apart from this protected area, the land use is predominantly grazing on native vegetation.

== Demographics ==
In the 2016 census, Round Hill had a population of 136 people.

In the 2021 census, Round Hill had a population of 189 people.

== Education ==
There are no schools in Round Hill. The nearest government primary schools are Agnes Water State School in neighbouring Agnes Water to the north-east and Wartburg State School in Baffle Creek to the south. The nearest government secondary schools are Miriam Vale State School (to Year 10) in Miriam Vale to the west and Rosedale State School (to Year 12) in Rosedale to the south. However, some students in the north of Round Hill would be too distant to attend Rosedale State School; the alternatives are distance education and boarding school.

== Amenities ==
Despite its name, the 1770 Golf Club is at 2366 Round Hill Road, Round Hill (24.2428°S 151.8637°E). It is a 9-hole course over 68 acres (28 ha).

== Facilities ==
Despite the name, Agnes Water Ambulance Station is at 2385 Round Hill Road, Round Hill (24.2416°S 151.8638°E).
