= Taunton, Queensland =

Taunton
- Suburb
- Interactive map of Taunton
- Coordinates: 24.4222°S 151.7930°E
- Country: Australia
- State: Queensland
- LGA: Gladstone Region
- Location: 28.4 km (17.6 mi) NNW of Rosedale; 32.7 km (20.3 mi) SE of Miriam Vale; 85.0 km (52.8 mi) NW of Bundaberg; 101 km (63 mi) SSE of Gladstone; 451 km (280 mi) N of Brisbane

Government
  - State electorate: Burnett
  - Federal division: Flynn

Area
  - Total: 113.8 km^{2} (43.9 sq mi)

Population
  - Total: 57 (2021 census)
  - Density: 0.501/km^{2} (1.297/sq mi)
- Time zone: UTC+10:00 (AEST)
- Postcode: 4674
Suburbs around Taunton
Mount Tom	Captain Creek	Round Hill
Mount Tom	Taunton	Oyster Creek
Colosseum; Lowmead	Mount Maria	Euleilah

Taunton is a rural locality in the Gladstone Region, Queensland, Australia. In the 2021 census, Taunton had a population of 57 people.

== Geography ==
The locality is bounded to the east by Rocky Creek, to the south by Euleilah Creek, and to the south-west by Baffle Creek.

The terrain ranges from elevations of 10 to 350 metres (33 to 1,148 ft) with one named peak, South Gwynne, in the south-west of the locality (24.4629°S 151.7586°E) 265 metres (869 ft).

The land use is predominantly grazing on native vegetation.

== History ==
The locality takes its name from the parish, which in turn was named after an early pastoral station, which is believed to be named after Taunton in England.

== Demographics ==
In the 2016 census, Taunton had a population of 69 people.

In the 2021 census, Taunton had a population of 57 people.

== Education ==
There are no schools in Taunton. The nearest government primary schools are Lowmead State School in neighbouring Lowmead to the south-west and Wartburg State School in Baffle Creek to the south-east. The nearest government secondary schools are Miriam Vale State School (to Year 10) in Miriam Vale to the north-west and Rosedale State School (to Year 12) in Rosedale to the south-east.
