= Mount Maria, Queensland =

Mount Maria
- Suburb
- Interactive map of Mount Maria
- Coordinates: 24.5416°S 151.825°E
- Country: Australia
- State: Queensland
- LGA: Gladstone Region
- Location: 17.0 km (10.6 mi) NW of Rosedale; 73.5 km (45.7 mi) NW of Bundaberg; 113 km (70 mi) SSE of Gladstone; 435 km (270 mi) NNW of Brisbane

Government
  - State electorate: Burnett
  - Federal division: Flynn

Area
  - Total: 99.8 km^{2} (38.5 sq mi)

Population
  - Total: 225 (2021 census)
  - Density: 2.255/km^{2} (5.839/sq mi)
- Time zone: UTC+10:00 (AEST)
- Postcode: 4674
Suburbs around Mount Maria
Taunton	Taunton	Euleilah
Lowmead	Mount Maria	Euleilah
Lowmead	Berajondo	Rosedale

Mount Maria is a rural locality in the Gladstone Region, Queensland, Australia. In the 2021 census, Mount Maria had a population of 225 people.

== Geography ==
Baffle Creek forms the south-western boundary and the south-eastern and eastern boundary (but not the southern boundary). Euleilah Creek forms the north-west boundary of the locality; it later becomes a tributary of Baffle Creek.

Grants Island is 1.7-hectare (4.2-acre) island in Baffle Creek which is within the Mount Maria loality (24.5506°S 151.9061°E).

The mountain Mount Maria is in the south of the locality (24.5413°S 151.8440°E) and rises to 340 metres (1,120 ft) above sea level. It presumably gives its name to the locality.

Tablelands Road enters the locality from the south (Berajondo) and exits to the north (Taunton); it is the main road through the locality.

The land use is predominantly grazing on native vegetation.

== Demographics ==
In the 2016 census, Mount Maria had a population of 193 people.

In the 2021 census, Mount Maria had a population of 225 people.

== Education ==
There are no schools in Mount Maria. The nearest government primary schools are Lowmead State School in neighbouring Lowmead to the west, Rosedale State School in neighbouring Rosedale to the south-east, and Wartburg State School in Baffle Creek to the east. The nearest government secondary school is Rosedale State School (to Year 12).
