= Oyster Creek, Queensland =

Oyster Creek
- Suburb
- Interactive map of Oyster Creek
- Coordinates: 24.4277°S 151.8611°E
- Country: Australia
- State: Queensland
- LGA: Gladstone Region
- Location: 5.7 km (3.5 mi) W of Baffle Creek; 30.4 km (18.9 mi) N of Rosedale; 87 km (54 mi) NW of Bundaberg CBD; 117 km (73 mi) SSE of Gladstone CBD; 438 km (272 mi) N of Brisbane

Government
  - State electorate: Burnett
  - Federal division: Flynn

Area
  - Total: 41.3 km^{2} (15.9 sq mi)

Population
  - Total: 39 (2021 census)
  - Density: 0.944/km^{2} (2.45/sq mi)
- Time zone: UTC+10:00 (AEST)
- Postcode: 4674
Suburbs around Oyster Creek
Taunton	Round Hill	Deepwater
Taunton	Oyster Creek	Deepwater
Euleilah	Euleilah	Baffle Creek

Oyster Creek is a rural locality in the Gladstone Region, Queensland, Australia. In the 2021 census, Oyster Creek had a population of 39 people.

== Geography ==
The watercourse Oyster Creek forms the north-western boundary of the locality (24.44809°S 151.85049°E), after which it becomes a tributary of Euleilah Creek which forms the south-western boundary of the locality, and ultimately becomes a tributary of Baffle Creek which flows into the Coral Sea.

Hacking Hill is in the east of the locality (24.4172°S 151.8694°E), rising to 241 metres (791 ft) above sea level. It is part of the Matchbox Range.

The land use is predominantly grazing on native vegetation.

== History ==
Oyster Creek State School opened in 1913 under head teacher Alexander Gustav Louis Gelhaar. The school celebrated its 21st birthday in 1934 with Mr Gelhaar returning for the celebrations. It closed circa 1943. It was on the western side of Oyster Creek Road (approx 24.4440°S 151.85119°E).

== Demographics ==
In the 2016 census, Oyster Creek had a population of 54 people.

In the 2021 census, Oyster Creek had a population of 39 people.

== Education ==
There are no schools in Oyster Creek. The nearest government primary school is Wartburg State School in neighbouring Baffle Creek to the south-east. The nearest government secondary school is Rosedale State School (to Year 12) in Rosedale to the south.
