= Rules Beach, Queensland =

Rules Beach
- Town
- Interactive map of Rules Beach
- Coordinates: 24.4934°S 152.0382°E
- Country: Australia
- State: Queensland
- LGA: Gladstone Region
- Location: 45.3 km (28.1 mi) NE of Rosedale; 102 km (63 mi) NNW of Bundaberg; 132 km (82 mi) SE of Gladstone CBD; 233 km (145 mi) SE of Rockhampton; 453 km (281 mi) N of Brisbane

Government
  - State electorate: Burnett
  - Federal division: Flynn

Area
  - Total: 40.8 km^{2} (15.8 sq mi)

Population
  - Total: 56 (2021 census)
  - Density: 1.373/km^{2} (3.55/sq mi)
- Time zone: UTC+10:00 (AEST)
- Postcode: 4674
Localities around Rules Beach
Deepwater	Deepwater	Coral Sea
Baffle Creek	Rules Beach	Coral Sea
Winfield	Mullett Creek	Coral Sea

Rules Beach is a coastal town and rural locality in the Gladstone Region, Queensland, Australia. In the 2021 census, the locality of Rules Beach had a population of 56 people.

== Geography ==
The southern boundary of the locality is Baffle Creek as it enters the Coral Sea. The land to the north of Baffle Creek as it enters the sea is the Mouth of Baffle Creek Conservation Park. The town itself is a single street of houses by the ocean.

The land use is predominantly grazing on native vegetation with some horticulture.

== History ==
The locality was named and bounded on 9 April 1999.

On 26 November 2018, the Queensland Government ordered the evacuation of Baffle Creek, Deepwater and Rules Beach due to a "dangerous and unpredictable" bushfire 50-kilometre (31 mi) wide and covering 5,000 hectares (12,000 acres) with flames of 10 to 12 metres (33 to 39 ft) high during an extreme heatwave.

== Demographics ==
In the 2016 census, the locality of Rules Beach had a population of 86 people.

In the 2021 census, the locality of Rules Beach had a population of 56 people.

== Education ==
There are no schools in Rules Beach. The nearest government primary school is Wartburg State School in neighbouring Baffle Creek to the west and Winfield State School in neighbouring Winfield to the south-west. The nearest government secondary school is Rosedale State School (to Year 12) in Rosedale to the south-west.
