= Euleilah, Queensland =

Euleilah
- Suburb
- Interactive map of Euleilah
- Coordinates: 24.4916°S 151.8569°E
- Country: Australia
- State: Queensland
- LGA: Gladstone Region
- Location: 23.2 km (14.4 mi) N of Rosedale; 79.7 km (49.5 mi) NW of Bundaberg; 112 km (70 mi) SSE of Gladstone; 213 km (132 mi) SE of Rockhampton; 442 km (275 mi) NNW of Brisbane

Government
  - State electorate: Burnett
  - Federal division: Flynn

Area
  - Total: 58.6 km^{2} (22.6 sq mi)

Population
  - Total: 202 (2021 census)
  - Density: 3.447/km^{2} (8.928/sq mi)
- Time zone: UTC+10:00 (AEST)
- Postcode: 4674
Suburbs around Euleilah
Taunton	Oyster Creek	Oyster Creek
Mount Maria	Euleilah	Baffle Creek
Mount Maria	Mount Maria	Rosedale

Euleilah is a rural locality in the Gladstone Region, Queensland, Australia. In the 2021 census, Euleilah had a population of 202 people.

== Geography ==
The locality is bounded to the north, north-east, and east by Euleilah Creek, which becomes a tributary of Baffle Creek on the eastern boundary of the locality (24.50249°S 151.92548°E), which then flows into the Coral Sea.

The predominant land use is grazing on native vegetation.

== Demographics ==
In the 2016 census, Euleilah had a population of 182 people.

In the 2021 census, Euleilah had a population of 202 people.

== Education ==
There are no schools in Euleilah. The nearest government primary school is Wartburg State School in neighbouring Baffle Creek to the east. The nearest government secondary school is Rosedale State School (to Year 12) in neighbouring Rosedale to the south-east.
