= Deepwater, Queensland =

Deepwater
- Suburb
- Interactive map of Deepwater
- Coordinates: 24.3958°S 151.9486°E
- Country: Australia
- State: Queensland
- LGA: Gladstone Region
- Location: 45.3 km (28.1 mi) NNE of Rosedale; 102 km (63 mi) NNW of Bundaberg; 132 km (82 mi) SSE of Gladstone; 470 km (290 mi) N of Brisbane

Government
  - State electorate: Burnett
  - Federal division: Flynn

Area
  - Total: 250.7 km^{2} (96.8 sq mi)

Population
  - Total: 287 (2021 census)
  - Density: 1.1448/km^{2} (2.965/sq mi)
- Time zone: UTC+10:00 (AEST)
- Postcode: 4674
Suburbs around Deepwater
Round Hill	Agnes Water	Coral Sea
Oyster Creek	Deepwater	Coral Sea
Baffle Creek	Baffle Creek	Rules Beach

Deepwater is a coastal locality in the Gladstone Region, Queensland, Australia. In the 2021 census, Deepwater had a population of 287 people.

== Geography ==
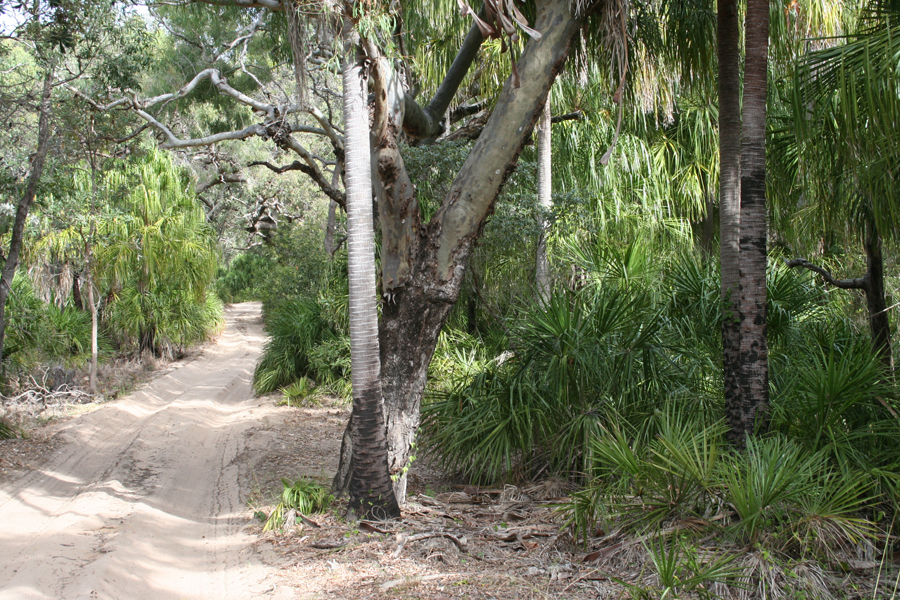
Deepwater National Park, 2008

Broadwater Creek and Blackwater Creek flow through the locality merging just before entering the Coral Sea. The Broadwater Conservation Park lies between the creek and the ocean. The north of the locality is within the Deepwater National Park.

Deepwater has the following hills:

- Maude Hill in the west of the locality (24.3808°S 151.8845°E) 123 metres (404 ft)
- Toowong Hill near the coast (24.3561°S 151.9591°E) 45 metres (148 ft)

The land use is predominantly grazing on native vegetation with some crop growing.

== History ==
The locality was officially named and bounded on 9 April 1999.

On 26 November 2018, the Queensland Government ordered the evacuation of Baffle Creek, Deepwater and Rules Beach due to a "dangerous and unpredictable" bushfire 50-kilometre (31 mi) wide and covering 5,000 hectares (12,000 acres) with flames of 10 to 12 metres (33 to 39 ft) high during an extreme heatwave.

== Demographics ==
In the 2016 census, Deepwater had a population of 206 people.

In the 2021 census, Deepwater had a population of 287 people.

== Education ==
There are no schools in Deepwater. The nearest government primary school is Wartburg State School in neighbouring Baffle Creek to the south. The nearest government secondary school is Rosedale State School (to Year 12) in Rosedale to the south.
