= Berajondo, Queensland =

Berajondo
- Suburb
- Interactive map of Berajondo
- Coordinates: 24.6305°S 151.8152°E
- Country: Australia
- State: Queensland
- LGA: Gladstone Region
- Location: 8.6 km (5.3 mi) W of Rosedale; 65.2 km (40.5 mi) NW of Bundaberg; 121 km (75 mi) SE of Gladstone; 427 km (265 mi) NNW of Brisbane

Government
  - State electorate: Burnett
  - Federal division: Flynn

Area
  - Total: 114.1 km^{2} (44.1 sq mi)

Population
  - Total: 112 (2021 census)
  - Density: 0.982/km^{2} (2.542/sq mi)
- Time zone: UTC+10:00 (AEST)
- Postcode: 4674
Suburbs around Berajondo
Lowmead	Lowmead	Mount Maria
Lowmead	Berajondo	Rosedale
Lowmead	Rosedale	Rosedale

Berajondo is a rural locality in the Gladstone Region, Queensland, Australia. In the 2021 census, Berajondo had a population of 112 people.

== Geography ==
Baffle Creek enters the locality from the north (Lowmead) and exits to the north-east (Mount Maria / Rosedale), ultimately flowing into the Coral Sea.

Lowmead Road enters the locality from the east (Rosedale) and exits to the north (Lowmead). The North Coast railway line enters the locality from the east (Rosedale) just south of Lowmead Road and runs loosely parallel to the road into Lowmead. The locality is served by Berajondo railway station in the north-east of the locality (24.6169°S 151.8429°E).

There is a small section of Warro National Park in the west of the locality, extending into neighbouring Lowmead, while Baffle Creek Conservation Park is in the north-east of the locality. Apart from these protected area, the predominant land use is grazing on native vegetation.

== History ==
Milsted Provisional School opened on 3 June 1895. On 1 January 1909, it became Milstead State School. In 1911, it was renamed Murray's Creek State School and then renamed in 1931 as Berajondo State School. It closed on 31 December 1965. It was at 173 Dawsons Road (24.62758°S 151.83250°E).

The Cairns Tilt Train derailment occurred at 11:55 pm on 15 November 2004 when the City of Townsville diesel tilt train derailed north of Berajondo. The prima facie cause of the incident was excessive speed; the train was travelling at 112 km/h (70 mph) when it derailed at the beginning of a curve with a speed limit of 60 km/h (37 mph). Despite the seriousness of the incident, there were no fatalities, but some people were injured.

== Demographics ==
In the 2016 census, Berajondo had a population of 61 people.

In the 2021 census, Berajondo had a population of 112 people.

== Education ==
There are no schools in Berajondo. The nearest government primary schools are Rosedale State School in neighbouring Rosedale to the east and Lowmead State School in neighbouring Lowmead to the north. The nearest government secondary school is Rosedale State School (to Year 12).
