= Winfield, Queensland =

Winfield
- Suburb
- Interactive map of Winfield
- Coordinates: 24.5638°S 152.0019°E
- Country: Australia
- State: Queensland
- LGA: Bundaberg Region
- Location: 61.6 km (38.3 mi) NW of Bundaberg CBD; 417 km (259 mi) N of Brisbane

Government
  - State electorate: Burnett
  - Federal division: Flynn

Area
  - Total: 50.0 km^{2} (19.3 sq mi)

Population
  - Total: 154 (2021 census)
  - Density: 3.080/km^{2} (7.98/sq mi)
- Time zone: UTC+10:00 (AEST)
- Postcode: 4670
Suburbs around Winfield
Baffle Creek	Baffle Creek	Rules Beach
Rosedale	Winfield	Mullett Creek
Rosedale	Watalgan	Mullett Creek

Winfield is a rural locality in the Bundaberg Region, Queensland, Australia. In the 2021 census, Winfield had a population of 154 people.

== Geography ==
Baffle Creek forms the northern boundary.

== History ==
Winfield State School opened on 4 March 1924.

== Demographics ==
In the 2016 census, Winfield had a population of 146 people.

In the 2021 census, Winfield had a population of 154 people.

== Education ==
Winfield State School is a government primary (Early Childhood-6) school at 1091 Winfield Road (24.5457°S 152.0174°E). In 2013, there were 16 students enrolled, but, by August 2017, there were no students and no prospect of new enrolments in the coming years. The changing demographics of the area had seen an increase in retirees and tourists but a loss of young families with school-aged children due to a lack of local jobs. The school is expected to be permanently closed, but, as at 2022, the school remains mothballed.

There are no secondary schools in Winfield. The nearest government primary and secondary school is Rosedale State School (Prep–12) in neighbouring Rosedale to the south-west.

== Amenities ==
There is a boat ramp on Rocky Point Road on the south bank of Baffle Creek (24.5170°S 152.0137°E). It is managed by the Bundaberg Regional Council.
