= Deepwater National Park =

National park in Australia

- IUCN category II (national park)
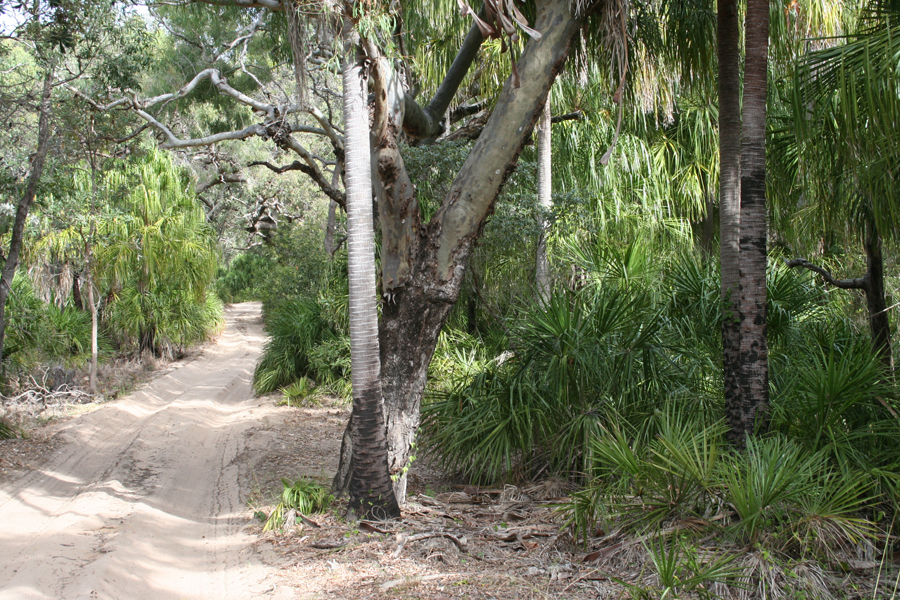
- Track into Deepwater National Park from the north.

- Location within Queensland
- Location: Queensland
- Coordinates: 24°15′40″S 151°53′31″E
- Area: 43.90 km^{2} (16.95 sq mi)
- Established: 1988
- Governing body: Queensland Parks and Wildlife Service
- Website: Official website

Deepwater is a coastal national park in Queensland, Australia, 375 km north of Brisbane. It protects an area of sand dunes and coastal heaths in the Deepwater Creek catchment. The area is one of the few remaining pristine freshwater catchments on Queensland's east coast. Deepwater National Park was established in 1988 and covers 4,090 ha.

The north of the park is dominated by a 70 m high sand dune which is covered in vegetation. There are some scattered rocky outcrops of volcanic origin including a number of rocky headlands along the park's 9 km of beach frontage.

== Flora and fauna ==
Vegetation in the park is varied between the seaward and landward side of the high dune. To the east are typical beach plants, on the exposed higher areas the plants appear wind-sheared and to the west in more protected area taller vegetation has formed up to three canopy levels of forest and woodlands.

Beaches in the park are used for nesting by loggerhead and leatherback turtles. Flatback and green turtles also nest on the park's beaches. This location is the only mainland site where leatherbacks repeatedly return to lay eggs.

Rose-crowned fruit doves, fairy gerygones and grey fantails are commonly found in the canopies to the west. Along the beaches pied oystercatcher, bar-tailed godwits, tattlers and crested terns are often seen. Emus and brahminy kites can also be found in the park.

Queensland's largest cockroach Macro-panesthia sp. is found in the park.

== Facilities ==
Camping facilities, pit toilets and picnic tables are located at Wreck Rock, 5.5 km north of the park's southern boundary. A second camp site is located further north at Middle Rock, however there are no facilities here. Picnic facilities for day visitors is provided at Flat Rock.

No domestic animals or open fires are permitted in the park.

== Access ==
The park is accessible from the south through Wartburg. Conventional vehicle access possible in the dry season only. Alternative access is possible from the north through Agnes Water. A 4WD vehicle is recommended for this route due to sandy conditions and the slope.

== See also ==
- Protected areas of Queensland
