= Kabra, Queensland =

Kabra
- Town
- Interactive map of Kabra
- Coordinates: 23.4716°S 150.3972°E
- Country: Australia
- State: Queensland
- LGA: Rockhampton Region
- Location: 20.7 km (12.9 mi) SW of Rockhampton; 21.6 km (13.4 mi) N of Mount Morgan; 623 km (387 mi) NNW of Brisbane

Government
  - State electorate: Mirani
  - Federal division: Flynn

Area
  - Total: 94.7 km^{2} (36.6 sq mi)

Population
  - Total: 430 (2021 census)
  - Density: 4.54/km^{2} (11.76/sq mi)
- Time zone: UTC+10:00 (AEST)
- Postcode: 4702
Localities around Kabra
Stanwell	Nine Mile	Gracemere
Stanwell	Kabra	Gracemere
Stanwell	Bouldercombe	Bouldercombe

Kabra is a rural town and locality in the Rockhampton Region, Queensland, Australia. In the 2021 census, the locality of Kabra had a population of 430 people.

Boongary is a neighbourhood in the south-east of the locality (23.5166°S 150.4166°E).

== Geography ==
The town is in the north-east of the locality on the Capricorn Highway. Middle Creek passes through the town and Gracemere Creek passes through the rural part of the locality.

The Central Western railway line passes through the locality from Rockhampton to Winton with the following stations within the locality:

- Kabra railway station, serving the town (23.4689°S 150.3946°E)
- Neerkol railway station (23.4840°S 150.3543°E)

The Dawson Valley railway line commenced at Kabra railway station and went to Theodore with the following stations in the locality:

- Boongary railway station (23.5196°S 150.4069°E)
- Callan railway station (23.5443°S 150.3994°E)

The Dawson Valley railway line is now closed and its stations abandoned.

The locality of Kabra has the following mountains:

- Cargoogie Mountain (23.4544°S 150.3874°E) 187 metres (614 ft) above sea level
- Table Mountain (23.5165°S 150.3831°E) 343 metres (1,125 ft) above sea level

The land use is mixed. Housing is not limited to the town area with pockets of rural residential development mainly in the east of the locality. The agricultural use is predominantly grazing on native vegetation but also on modified pastures. There is also some cropping and a number of quarries.

== History ==
In the 1860s, Cargoogie Mountain (or Police Mountain) adjacent to Kabra was an outpost for the Native Police. It served as a depot for troopers and horses, and messages would be communicated from this outpost to the main barracks near Rockhampton via heliograph or smoke signals. Skeletal remains, some in manacles, were occasionally unearthed when ploughing the fields around the outpost after it had ceased operations.

A post office was opened on 7 September 1887; it closed on 31 October 1977.

The first stage of the railway line to Mount Morgan (subsequently extended to Theodore) opened on 15 June 1898, branching at Kabra railway station. The Boongary railway station was named by the Queensland Railways Department and the name Boongarry is an Aboriginal word meaning tree kangaroo and that name also refers to the neighbourhood around the railway station.

Land was reserved for a school in Kabra in July 1902 and the Kabra Provisional School opened on 29 October 1902. On 1 January 1909 it became Kabra State School. Due to falling enrolment numbers, the school closed on 23 February 1941; the last teacher was Harry Adolph Barke.

On 29 September 1917, an honour board was unveiled at the Kabra railway station, listing men from the district who served in World War I. It was 5 feet (1.5 m) high and 4 feet (1.2 m) wide and made of polished silky oak. When the railway station closed, the honour board was relocated to the Kabra Hotel where it is now displayed in the dining room.

In 2012, Kabra residents began raising concerns about potential health risks associated with an increasing number of flying foxes roosting in the town. A colony of 15,000 flying foxes were living in the town's bloodwood trees. Rockhampton Regional Council told residents the flying fox colony in the town would only be temporary as between 95% and 99% of the colony were identified as transient little red flying foxes which were expected to move on after a short period. However, the flying foxes were still an issue for Kabra in 2014 when more than 40,000 bats were roosting in the town, prompting much discussion in the local media. In June 2014, the council received approval from the Department of Environment and Heritage Protection to modify local vegetation at Kabra, removing a number of trees and replacing them with native species which would be less appealing to flying foxes.

In January 2013, Kabra was impacted by flash flooding caused by the torrential rain brought the region from ex-Cyclone Oswald. Seven people were evacuated from Kabra by emergency services. Kabra was also affected by the 2018 Central Queensland bushfires in November 2018 when a fast moving fire front travelled through the town as it headed towards Gracemere, completely destroying one home.

== Demographics ==
In the 2011 census, the locality of Kabra had a population of 472 people.

In the 2016 census, the locality of Kabra had a population of 421 people.

In the 2021 census, the locality of Kabra had a population of 430 people.

== Education ==
There are no schools in Kabra. The nearest government primary schools are Waraburra State School in neighbouring Gracemere to the east, Gracemere State School also in Gracemere, Bouldercombe State School in neighbouring Bouldercombe to the south, and Stanwell State School in neighbouring Stanwell to the west. The nearest government secondary schools are Rockhampton State High School in Wandal in Rockhampton to the north-east and Mount Morgan State High School in Mount Morgan to the south-west.

== Attractions ==
Kabra is a major waypoint on the National Bicentennial Trail.

The town is also known for its regular mud racing events.
