= Cairns Tilt Train derailment =

Train accident that occurred in Queensland Australia in November 2004

Coordinates: 24.5862°S 151.8016°E

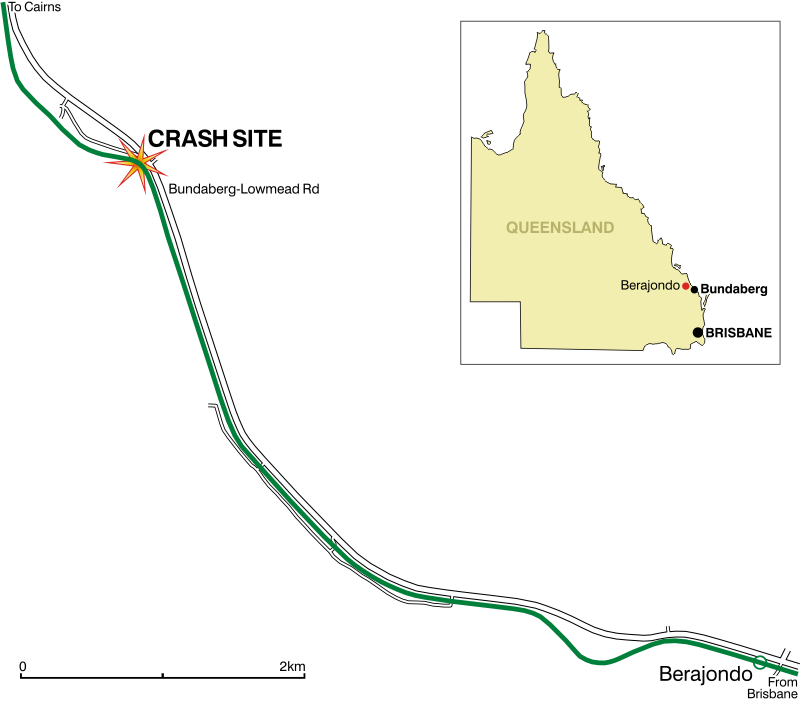

Details
- Date: 15 November 2004; 11:55 pm
- Location: Berajondo, Queensland; 342 km (213 mi) NNW from Brisbane
- Country: Australia
- Line: North Coast railway line
- Operator: QR Traveltrain
- Incident type: Derailment
- Cause: Excessive speed

Statistics
- Trains: 1
- Passengers: 157
- Deaths: 0
- Injured: 157, 2 serious

The Cairns Tilt Train derailment occurred at 11:55 pm on 15 November 2004 when the City of Townsville Diesel Tilt Train derailed north of Berajondo, approximately 342 km (213 mi) northwest of Brisbane, the state capital of Queensland, Australia.

The prima facie cause of the incident was excessive speed; the train was travelling at 112 km/h (70 mph) when it derailed at the beginning of a curve with a speed limit of 60 km/h (37 mph). Despite the seriousness of the incident, there were no fatalities.

== Background ==
=== The train ===
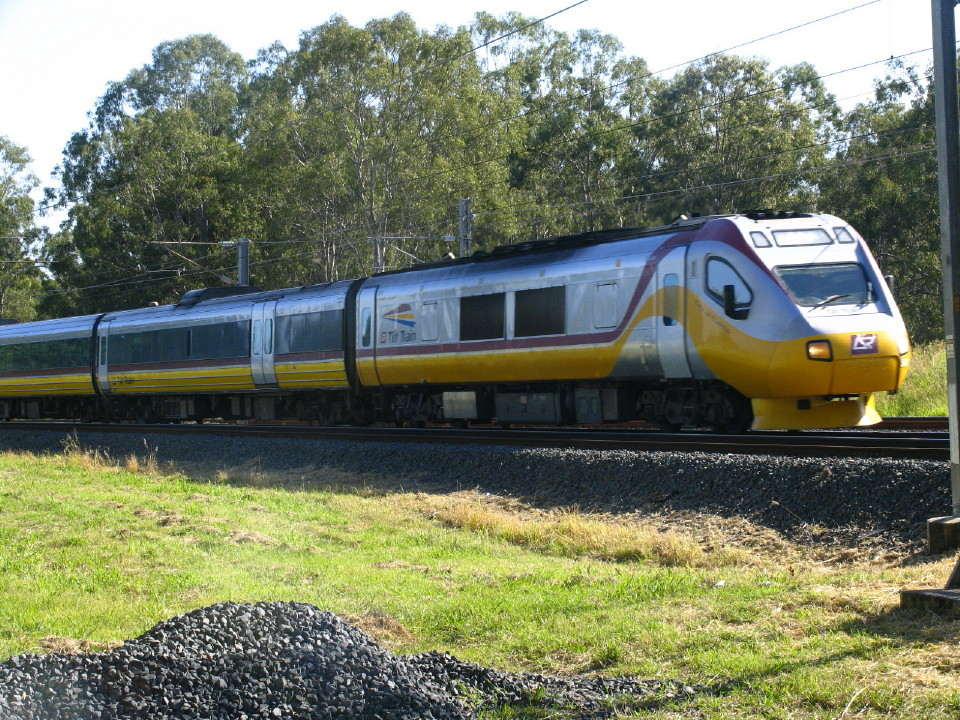
One of the two Cairns Tilt Trains

Following from the successful introduction of the two electric tilting trains between Brisbane and Rockhampton in 1998, the City of Cairns and City of Townsville diesel tilt trains were introduced on 15 June 2003 between Brisbane and Cairns. As only a third of the North Coast railway line from Brisbane to Cairns is electrified, the two diesel trains were required to further major destinations such as Townsville and Cairns.

Originally to be called "The Tropical Explorer" with a colourful tropical livery reflecting "the sun, blue sky, beach and palms", the name was soon quietly dropped and instead called the "Cairns Tilt Train" similar to its earlier electric version, with a simple, plain yellow and maroon striped livery along its stainless steel body.

The trains operate at speeds of up to 160 km/h (99 mph) and consist of two 1,350 kW (1,810 hp) push-pull diesel engines at each end (four engines per train), six sitting cars, and one Club Car with a trolley service delivering meals to seats. There is 2+1 Business Class seating throughout the train with an individual entertainment system of multiple movie and audio channels.

The trains are fitted with a data logger, manufactured by the Finnish company EKE Electronics Ltd., that records information about the vehicle and track, maintenance data, and the speed and operation of the train. This information was retrieved from the unit and used by investigators in determining the cause of the incident.

==== Train protection systems ====
Using the experience of its many years of railway operations, QR developed a series of methods to reduce the risk of accident to its tilt trains. The train was under the protection of:

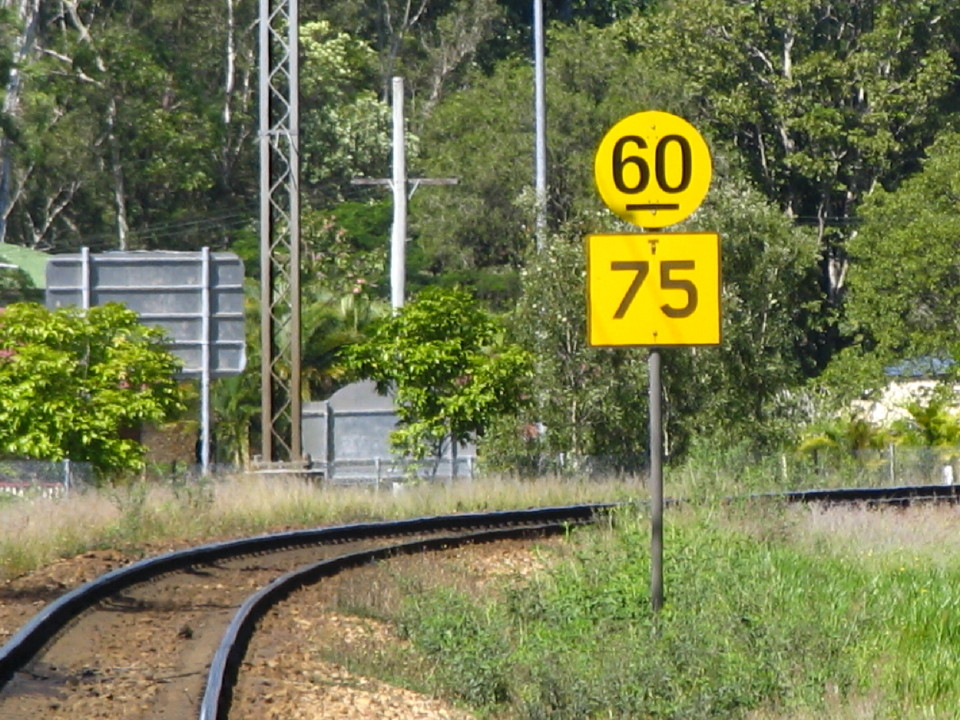
A speed board before a curved section of track; the boxed limit applies to Tilt Trains

- two driver operation – a co-driver acting as an observer to assist the driver, and ensure the driver is operating the train safely; they observe the route ahead independently and call signals, which the driver acknowledges, and can intervene if the driver does not respond appropriately
- on-board vigilance system – a device that tests the alertness of the driver with stimuli, and activates train brakes if there is no response
- Station Protection System – a system of sensors on the track to warn drivers with an alarm when they are approaching a station area that requires greater attention
- speed boards – posted signs beside the track that show drivers the speed they are required to have their train at or below before passing
- training – to ensure drivers are competent, which includes knowledge of the route the train operates along so drivers can recognise their geographic position and manage speed accordingly.

While QR had Automatic Train Protection on the line that would apply the brakes if the driver failed to respond to warnings, it was not implemented on tilt trains as it believed the protection methods it was using would be sufficient.

=== The service ===
The tilt trains cut the travel time between Brisbane and Rockhampton from nine to seven hours, with a daylight service between Mackay and Cairns so as not to duplicate electric tilt trains to Rockhampton. Services were three times a week, departing Roma Street railway station, Brisbane on Mondays, Wednesdays and Fridays at 6:25 pm, arriving Cairns railway station Tuesdays, Thursdays and Saturdays at 7:20 pm; returning from Cairns on Sundays, Wednesdays and Fridays at 8:15 am, arriving Brisbane at 9:10 am on Mondays, Thursdays and Saturdays.

== Incident ==
The train departed Roma Street railway station in the Brisbane central business district on time at 6:25 pm on service VCQ5 to Cairns. The first change of crew was at Bundaberg; the drivers of the first part of the journey found no defects with the train and reported the trip as uneventful.

Departing Bundaberg two minutes early at 11:11 pm with a driver and co-driver, five passenger service attendants and 150 passengers, the train reached Berajondo at 11:50 pm. Four minutes later, after passing through a series of curved sections of track with speed restrictions between 60 km/h (37 mph) and 80 km/h (50 mph), the co-driver left his seat and driver's cabin and went to a vestibule area adjacent to make a "brew" for the driver, as he had complained about the quality of the beverage offered at Bundaberg.

The driver was driving the train normally, keeping it under or close to posted speed limits. Travelling at 111 km/h (69 mph) with a limit of 150 km/h (93 mph), at 11:55:11 pm the train passed over a midsection train protection magnet to warn of a lower speed limit ahead. The driver immediately acknowledged the alarm, and kept the train at speed with the throttle at 60 per cent power. At 11:55:24 pm, close to the 60 km/h (37 mph) speed limit sign, the driver moved the train's throttle to zero power, then to emergency braking less than one second after.

At 11:55:27 pm, 419.493 km (260.661 mi) from Brisbane (Roma Street), the train derailed at 112 km/h (70 mph). Lead power car 5403 came to rest 108 m (354 ft) past the point of derailment parallel to the track after skidding onto its right side. Baggage car 'A' came to rest upright behind it, first sitting car 'B' was approximately 40 degrees off to the line of travel, sitting cars 'C' and 'D' jack-knifed at right angles to the track. Club car 'E' came to rest parallel to the track but some 15 m (49 ft) away from it due to the force of the derailing cars before and after it. Sitting car 'F' was about 90 degrees to the track, while the last sitting car 'G' was on the left side of the track. Trailing power car 5404 remained upright with just its lead bogie partially derailed to the left. All cars became uncoupled, except for cars 'A' and 'B'.

As the train derailed underneath electrified overhead lines, the Electrical Control Operator at Rockhampton contacted North Coast Control at 11:57 pm to report that a circuit breaker had tripped the 25 kV AC traction power supply approximately 419 kilometres (260 mi) north of Brisbane. North Coast Control identified this as where the tilt train was travelling through, and tried to contact the driver a number of times by radio but did not receive a response. As the train is powered by diesel engines, it would not necessarily have been affected by an interruption to the overhead power supply. At the same time, a passenger from the derailed train called emergency services on his mobile phone and raised the alarm of the incident. News of this incident was reported back to North Coast Control and at 12:02 am, along with the report by the Electrical Control Operator of the overhead traction power supply being tripped, it was recognised that a major incident had occurred.

== Investigation ==
Three investigations were launched after the incident: internally within QR; by Queensland Transport as rail safety in Queensland is regulated by the state government department, with the Department of Industrial Relations' Division of Workplace Health and Safety and Electrical Safety Office; and the Australian Transport Safety Bureau to look at causes for the incident and to make recommendations to prevent it happening again.

=== Initial train event recorder release ===
On 17 November 2004, just over a day after the derailment, QR's chief executive officer, Bob Scheuber, along with the Queensland Police Commissioner, Robert Atkinson, released the data held in the train event recorder that showed the train was travelling at 112 km/h (70 mph) when it derailed, at a point with a limit of 60 km/h (37 mph). Scheuber said it was not known if speed was the only cause of the derailment, but that "it would be one of the contributing factors". The release of this information angered the Australian Federated Union of Locomotive Employees, which covers train crews including drivers, which threatened a 24-hour strike on Friday, pending a telephone hook-up with members on Thursday night. The industrial action did not proceed.

=== Australian Transport Safety Bureau investigation findings ===
The prima facie cause of the derailment was excessive speed – 112 km/h (70 mph) at the beginning of a curve with a speed limit of 60 km/h (37 mph). The lead power car rolled, dragging most of the remaining cars off the track. The driver did not reduce speed before the train entered the curve where it derailed. The investigation believed there was no evidence the driver deliberately ignored speed limits or drove in excess of limits, nor that he intended the train to derail. Up to the time of the derailment, the train was in steady power, and the brakes were not activated until just before it derailed. The report found the driver may have been disorientated or distracted up to the curve, and did not recognise where the train was.

417.783 km (259.598 mi) from Brisbane, 1.71 km (1.06 mi) and 61 seconds before the derailment, the speed limit was 150 km/h (93 mph), an increase from 110 km/h (68 mph). The report found it may have been possible the driver mistook the midsection alarm to be the station protection magnet alarm before Baffle. After the curve where the train derailed is a similar layout of track, where, after an increase of the speed limit to 150 km/h (93 mph), is a left curve with a speed limit of 110 km/h (68 mph) before Baffle.

The report also found the driver may have left the driving position for a moment to get food from his bag or the mini fridge, under the belief it was safe to do so. After reorientating himself returning to his seat, it would have been too late to apply the emergency brakes with the train travelling too fast.

The second driver's absence from the cab removed the primary defences of having two drivers in the cab to avoid errors made by just one. The co-driver sits to the right of the driver, and their main task is to observe that the driver is controlling the train safely, to watch the direction the train is travelling and call signals verbally, which the driver acknowledges. The co-driver can intervene in the control of the train should the driver not react appropriately. Before the derailment, there was no requirement for the co-driver to call out critical speed limit changes, nor prohibit the co-driver from leaving the cab to, say, prepare beverages in the adjacent area.

The weather was fine, wind was low, and the temperature was 24.5 °C (76.1 °F). The moon had set at 7:23 pm, over four hours earlier, and was 26° below the horizon, meaning while visibility was good, the area was in complete darkness. With the exception of the illumination given by the headlights, this darkness exposed a weakness in another of the train's protection methods – drivers having knowledge and competence of the route they operate in – as landmarks cannot be seen, drivers' field of view is reduced and their spatial awareness compromised.

== Aftermath ==
Damage caused by the derailment was significant. About 120 m (390 ft) of track and sleepers was damaged, and three stanchions supporting the overhead power lines and associated wiring were destroyed and had to be replaced. The cost of the incident, including subsequent investigation, was estimated to be A$35.5 million.

Repairs to the track were completed on 20 November 2004, five days after the derailment. All tilt trains were limited to 100 km/h (62 mph), and resumed higher running speeds on 15 June 2007 after QR had implemented safety recommendations from the investigations including fitting the fleet with Automatic Train Protection that would automatically slow or stop the train if the driver has not responded to warnings of a stop signal ahead or a curve speed restriction.

The train sustained a considerable amount of damage and needed structural repairs. Thirty EDI Rail trade staff and 20 support staff from Korea, the Netherlands, Japan and Germany worked on repairs estimated to cost A$30 million. The train was fully repaired by its manufacturer, Downer Rail in Maryborough, and returned to service.
