= Eurimbula, Queensland =

Eurimbula
- Suburb
- Interactive map of Eurimbula
- Coordinates: 24.1597°S 151.7749°E
- Country: Australia
- State: Queensland
- LGA: Gladstone Region
- Location: 52 km (32 mi) NW of Agnes Water; 57 km (35 mi) SE of Tannum Sands; 74 km (46 mi) N of Gladstone; 113 km (70 mi) N of Rosedale; 497 km (309 mi) N of Brisbane

Government
  - State electorate: Burnett
  - Federal division: Flynn

Area
  - Total: 507.9 km^{2} (196.1 sq mi)

Population
  - Total: 0 (2021 census)
  - Density: 0.0000/km^{2} (0.0000/sq mi)
- Time zone: UTC+10:00 (AEST)
- Postcode: 4677
Suburbs around Eurimbula
Foreshores	Coral Sea	Coral Sea
Rodds Bay; Turkey Beach	Eurimbula	Seventeen Seventy; Agnes Water
Bororen	Mount Tom; Captain Creek	Round Hill

Eurimbula is a coastal rural locality in the Gladstone Region, Queensland, Australia. In the 2021 census, Eurimbula had "no people or a very low population". It is home to the Eurimbula National Park. The locality is part of the Gooreng Gooreng Aboriginal people's traditional territory.

== Geography ==
The waters and inlets of the Coral Sea form the north-western, northern, eastern, and south-eastern boundaries. The Bustard Head Light is within the locality.

== Demographics ==
In the 2016 census, Eurimbula had "no people or a very low population".

In the 2021 census, Eurimbula had "no people or a very low population".

== Heritage listings ==
Eurimbula has a number of heritage-listed sites, including:

- 50 kilometres (31 mi) south of Gladstone: Bustard Head Light

== Education ==
There are no schools in Eurimbula. The nearest government primary schools are Agnes Water State School in neighbouring Agnes Water to the east and Bororen State School in neighbouring Bororen to the south-west. The nearest government secondary schools are Tannum Sands State High School in Tannum Sands to the north-west and Rosedale State School in Rosedale to the south. There are also private primary and secondary schools in Agnes Water.
