= Watalgan =

- Suburb
- Interactive map of Watalgan
- Coordinates: 24.6477°S 152.0138°E
- Country: Australia
- State: Queensland
- LGA: Bundaberg Region
- Location: 12.3 km (7.6 mi) E of Rosedale; 46.3 km (28.8 mi) NW of Bundaberg; 398 km (247 mi) N of Brisbane

Government
  - State electorate: Burnett
  - Federal division: Flynn

Area
  - Total: 51.7 km^{2} (20.0 sq mi)

Population
  - Total: 38 (2021 census)
  - Density: 0.735/km^{2} (1.904/sq mi)
- Time zone: UTC+10:00 (AEST)
- Postcode: 4670
Suburbs around Watalgan
Rosedale	Winfield	Mullett Creek
Rosedale	Watalgan	Mullett Creek
Rosedale	Rosedale	Waterloo

Watalgan is a rural locality in the Bundaberg Region, Queensland, Australia. In the 2021 census, Watalgan had a population of 38 people.

== Geography ==
The North Coast railway line enters the locality from the west (Mullett Creek) and exits to the west (Rosedale). Historically, the locality was served by the Watalgan railway station, but, following a realignment of the railway line in 1996, it is now an abandoned railway station on a dismantled section of the line (24.6473°S 152.0252°E).

Rosedale Road enters the locality from the west (Mullett Creek) and exits to the west (Rosedale).

Littabella Conservation Park is in the west and south of the locality, extending into neighbouring Rosedale. There are a number of sections of the Watalgan State Forest in the east and south of the locality, extending into neighbouring Mullett Creek. Apart from these protected areas, the land use is predominantly grazing on native vegetation.

== History ==
The locality takes its name from the former Watalgan railway station, which was named by the Queensland Railways Department on 18 August 1913, after the Watalgan Range, a name believed to be of Aboriginal origin.

Watalgan Provisional School opened on 7 February 1927. In August 1933, it became Watalgan State School. It closed on 13 May 1963. It was located approx 24.64488°S 152.02613°E, but the land parcel no longer exists due to the realignment of the railway line in 1996.

== Demographics ==
In the 2016 census, Watalgan had a population of 38 people.

In the 2021 census, Watalgan had a population of 38 people.

== Education ==
There are no schools in Watalgan. The nearest government primary schools are Rosedale State School in neighbouring Rosedale to the west, Winfield State School in neighbouring Winfield to the north, and Yandaran State School in Yandaran to the south-east. The nearest government secondary school is Rosedale State School (to Year 12).
