= Diesel Tilt Train =

Australian higher-speed railway services

Diesel Tilt Train (DTT)
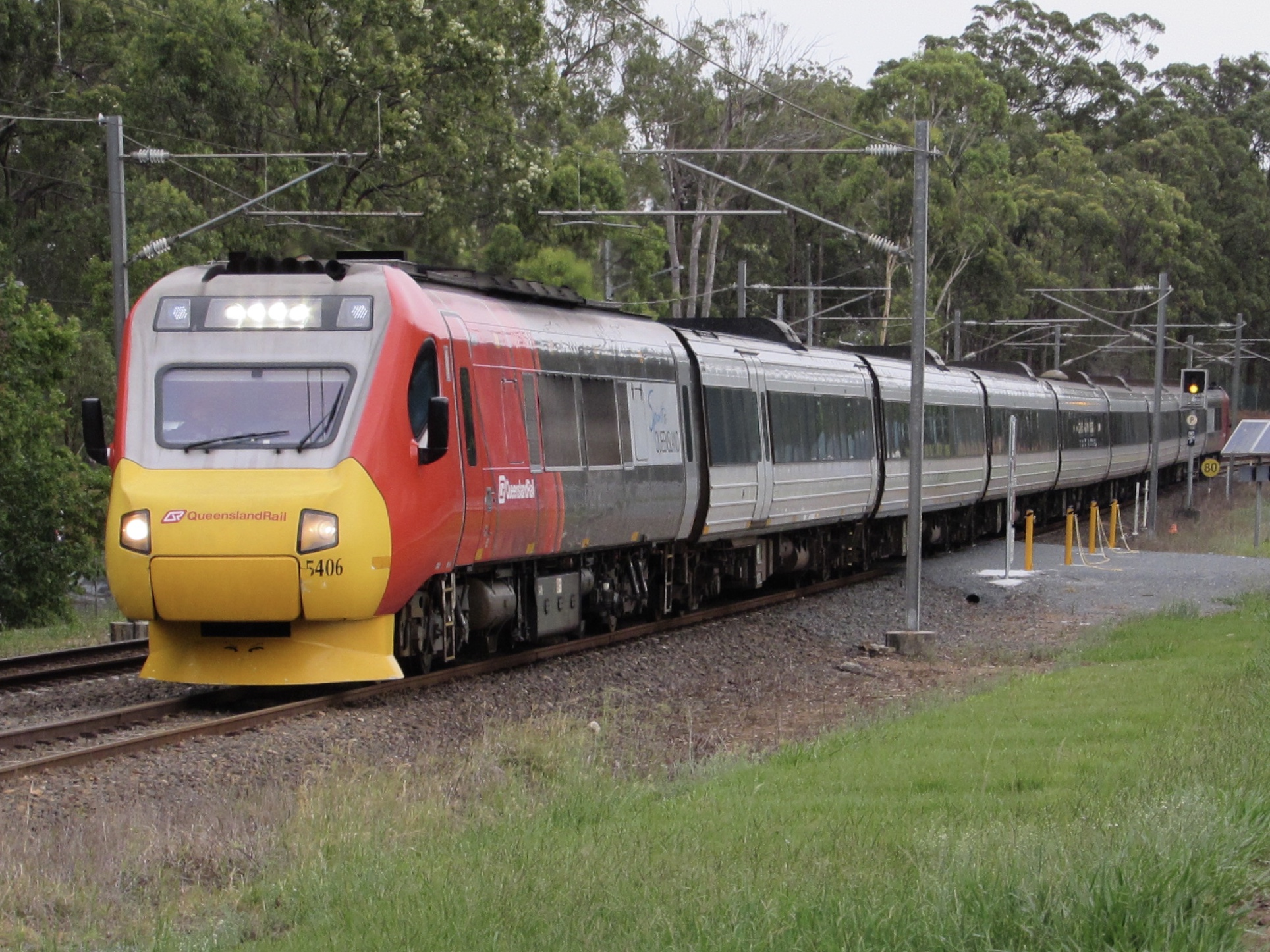
- DTT at Dakabin in 2020

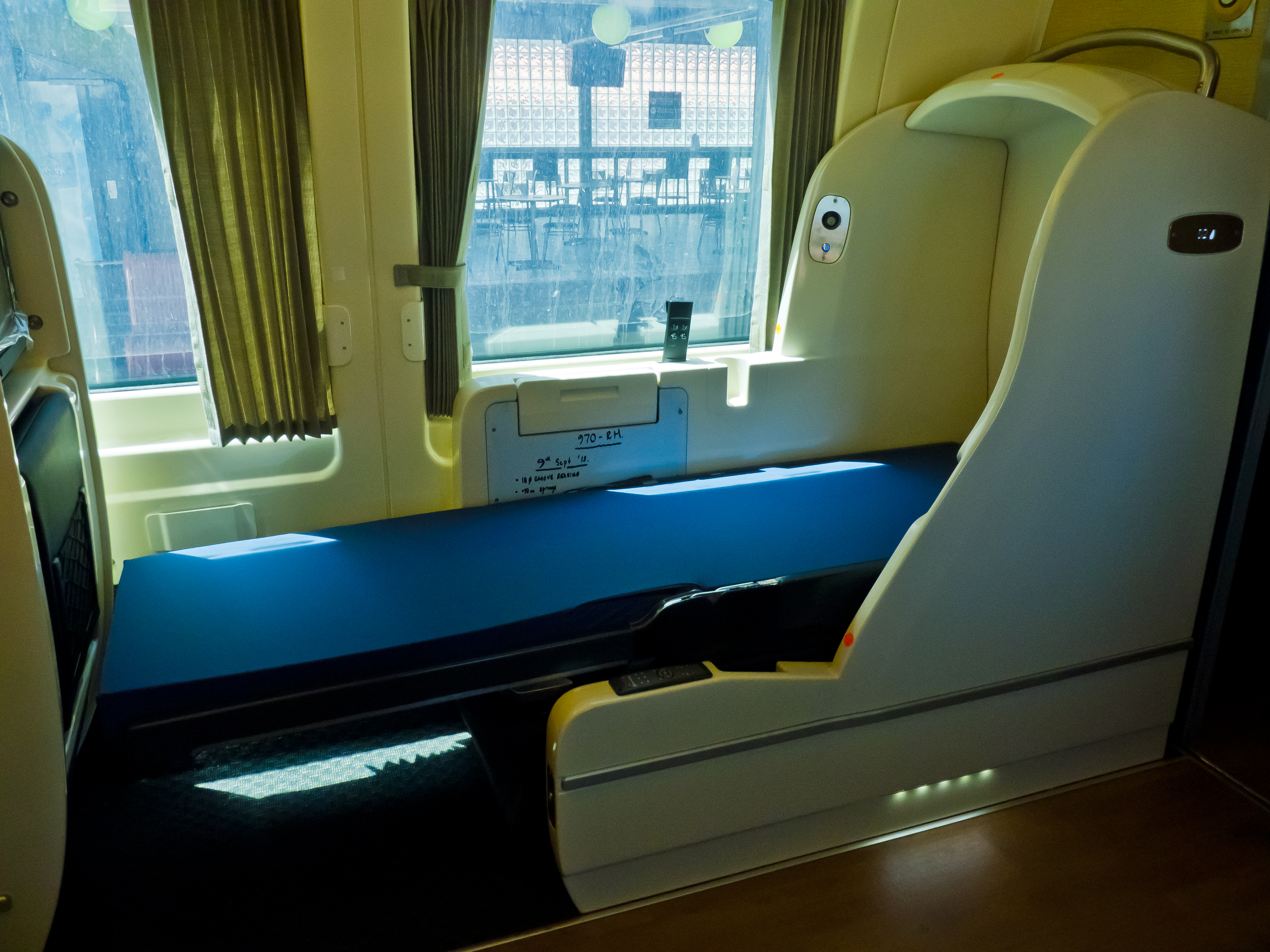
- RailBed class
- Stock type: Diesel trainset with locomotive-style power cars
- In service: 2003–present
- Manufacturer: EDi Rail
- Built at: Maryborough
- Constructed: 2003
- Refurbished: 2014
- Number built: 3
- Number in service: 3
- Formation: 2 diesel power cars on both ends + 7 cars=
- Operator: Queensland Rail
- Depot: Mayne
- Line served: North Coast

Specifications
- Maximum speed: 160 km/h (99 mph)
- Prime mover: German MTU
- Transmission: Hydraulic
- Track gauge: 1,067 mm (3 ft 6 in)

The Diesel Tilt Train (DTT) is a type of high-speed tilting train, operated and maintained by Queensland Rail. The DTT operates on the North Coast line from Brisbane to Cairns, as part of Queensland Rail's Spirit of Queensland service.

== History ==
In August 1999, Walkers was awarded a contract to build two diesel tilting trains to operate services from Brisbane to Cairns. In contrast to the Electric Tilt Train, the DTT is a top and tail power car-based train, although the two are externally similar. In October 2013, the first two sets were refurbished.

In November 2004, a DTT derailed and injured 157 people. All services were limited to 100 km/h (62 mph) until the track was upgraded and Automatic Train Protection was implemented allowing full speed operation to resume in June 2007.

In October 2010, Downer Rail was awarded a contract to build a third diesel tilting train with two power cars and 12 carriages to replace the locomotive hauled stock on The Sunlander. All work was performed in Maryborough. In October 2014, the third set was delivered and entered service.

== Interior ==
The DTT features 2×2 Economy class seating and 1×2 RailBed class seating. All seats include an audio and visual entertainment system. A trolley service is provided in RailBed class, and an onboard cafe is available on all journeys. Wi-Fi internet access is not available.

== Liveries ==
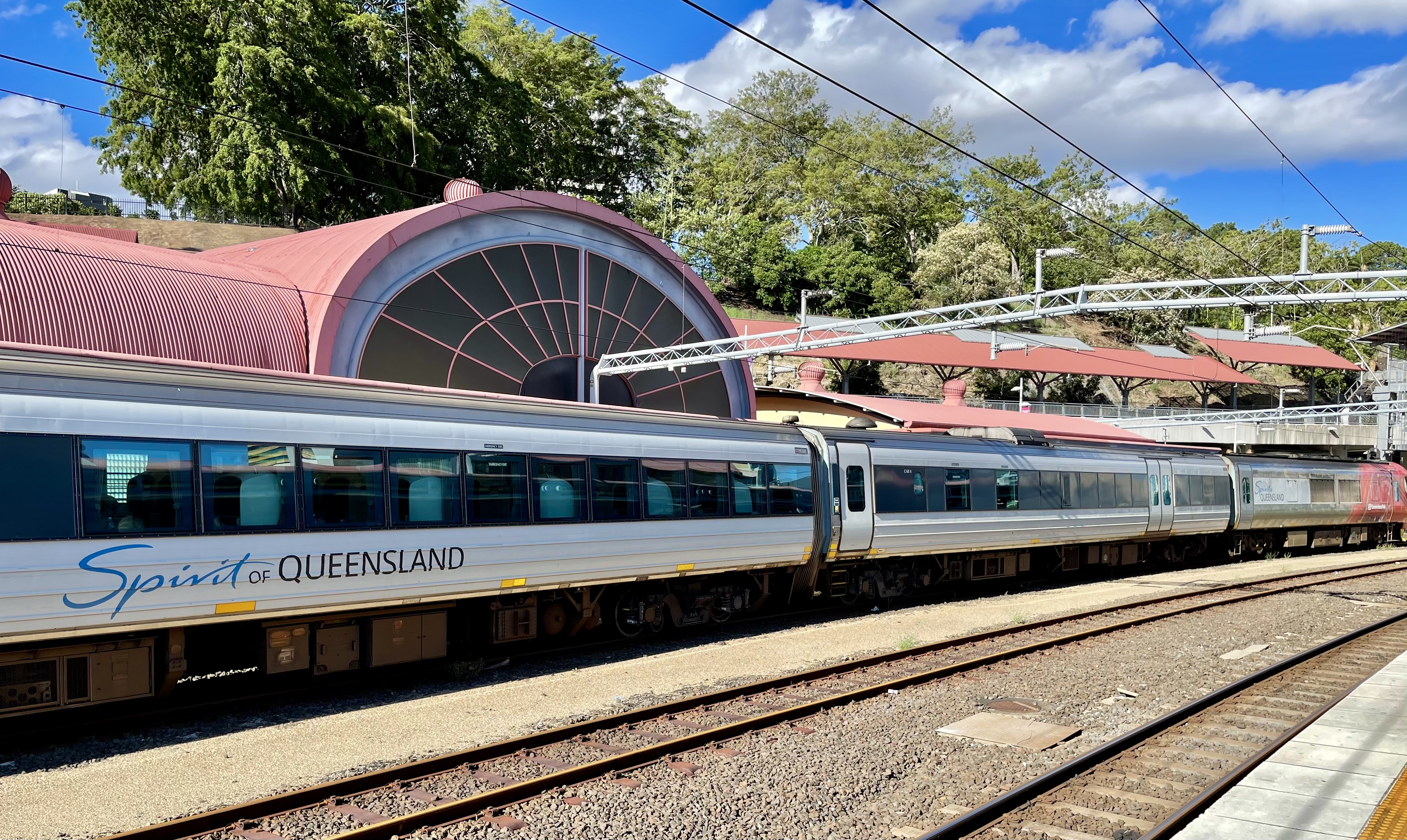
Spirit of Queensland carriages

The original livery was yellow, purple and silver in colour, which was retained until the Spirit Of Queensland had a major overhaul in 2010.

In 2010, designs by Torres Strait Islander artist Alick Tipoti were painted on one side of the carriages, while the work of Aboriginal artist of the Waanyi people, Judy Watson, was featured on the other side.
