= Mullett Creek =

- Suburb
- Interactive map of Mullett Creek
- Coordinates: 24.6005°S 152.0683°E
- Country: Australia
- State: Queensland
- LGA: Bundaberg Region
- Location: 23.6 km (14.7 mi) E of Rosedale; 49.6 km (30.8 mi) NW of Bundaberg CBD; 412 km (256 mi) N of Brisbane

Government
  - State electorate: Burnett
  - Federal division: Flynn

Area
  - Total: 94.9 km^{2} (36.6 sq mi)

Population
  - Total: 67 (2021 census)
  - Density: 0.706/km^{2} (1.829/sq mi)
- Time zone: UTC+10:00 (AEST)
- Postcode: 4670
Suburbs around Mullett Creek
Winfield	Rules Beach	Coral Sea
Winfield	Mullett Creek	Coral Sea
Watalgan	Waterloo	Yandaran

Mullett Creek is a rural coastal locality in the Bundaberg Region, Queensland, Australia. In the 2021 census, Mullett Creek had a population of 67 people.

== Geography ==
The North Coast railway line enters the locality from the south-east (Yandaran) and exits to the south-west (Watalgan). The locality was served by the now-abandoned Mullett Creek railway station in the south of the locality (24.6540°S 152.0562°E).

== History ==
Mullet Creek was formerly part of the locality of Littabella. It was named and bounded on 18 March 2005.

Mullett Creek Provisional School opened circa August 1910 as a half-time school with Baffle Creek Provisional School (meaning they shared a single teacher between the two schools). Baffle Creek School closed in 1915, after which Mullett Creek Provisional school remained a half-time school with Arthur's Creek Provisional School. In 1916 it became a full-time school (no longer sharing its teacher). On 17 January 1920, it became Mullett Creek State School. It closed circa 1963. The school name sometimes appears as "Mullet" (one "t"). Mullett Creek State School was east of the Mullett Creek railway station on Brandts Road (approx 24.65528°S 152.06148°E).

== Demographics ==
In the 2016 census, Mullett Creek had a population of 84 people.

In the 2021 census, Mullett Creek had a population of 67 people.

== Education ==
There are no schools in Mullett Creek. The nearest government primary schools are Winfield State School in neighbouring Winfield to the west and Yandaran State School in neighbouring Yandaran to the south-east. The nearest government secondary school is Rosedale State School (to Year 12) in Rosedale to the west.

== Amenities ==
There is a boat ramp on Winfield Road on the south bank of Baffle Creek (24.5321°S 152.0269°E). It is managed by the Bundaberg Regional Council.
