= Campwin Beach, Queensland =

Campwin Beach
- Town
- Interactive map of Campwin Beach
- Coordinates: 21.375°S 149.3152°E
- Country: Australia
- State: Queensland
- LGA: Mackay Region
- Location: 12.8 km (8.0 mi) ENE of Sarina; 40.1 km (24.9 mi) SSE of Mackay; 313 km (194 mi) NNW of Rockhampton; 931 km (578 mi) NNW of Brisbane

Government
  - State electorate: Mirani
  - Federal division: Capricornia

Area
  - Total: 1.8 km^{2} (0.69 sq mi)

Population
  - Total: 511 (2021 census)
  - Density: 284/km^{2} (735/sq mi)
- Time zone: UTC+10:00 (AEST)
- Postcode: 4737
Localities around Campwin Beach
Sarina Beach	Grasstree Beach	Coral Sea
Sarina Beach	Campwin Beach	Coral Sea
Sarina Beach	Sarina Beach	Coral Sea

Campwin Beach is a coastal town and rural locality in the Mackay Region, Queensland, Australia. In the 2021 census, the locality of Campwin Beach had a population of 511 people.

== Geography ==
The J-shaped locality is bounded by the Coral Sea to the east, the Castrades Inlet (21.37611°S 149.3100°E) to the north-west, and loosely by an unnamed creek to the west.

The headland in the north-east has Coral Point (21.3692°S 149.3181°E) as its northernmost point. The headland area has a rocky coast with Coral Point Reef (21.3721°S 149.3194°E) just off the north-east coast of the locality. Campwin Beach is a sand beach to the south of the rocky headland (21.3749°S 149.3165°E) and is accessible to the public via Campwin Esplanade.

The north-east of the locality is residential (the town) while the southern part is occupied by the Campwin Beach Prawn Farm (21.3825°S 149.3048°E). Much of land alongside Castrades Inlet is marshland and undeveloped (21.3772°S 149.3024°E).

== History ==
The original owners of the land were businessman James Campbell and William Winter and the town name is a combination of their surnames. The town was officially named and bounded on 30 January 2009, but name was in use earlier since at least 1930.

== Demographics ==
In the 2016 census, the locality of Campwin Beach had a population of 517 people.

In the 2021 census, the locality of Campwin Beach had a population of 511 people.

== Economy ==
The Campwin Bay prawn farm typically yields 70 to 100 tonnes (77 to 110 tons) of prawns each year, which are cooked on site and auctioned through the Sydney Fish Market.

== Amenities ==
There is a boat ramp into the Castrades Inlet at the end of Campwin Beach Boat Ramp Road (21.3744°S 149.312702°E).

== Education ==
There are no schools in the locality. The nearest government primary school is Alligator Creek State School at Alligator Creek to the north-west. The nearest government secondary school is Sarina State High School in Sarina to the south-west.
