= Eurimbula National Park =

National park in Australia

- IUCN category II (national park)
- Location within Queensland
- Location: Queensland
- Nearest city: Agnes Water
- Coordinates: 24°10′34″S 151°46′57″E
- Area: 125 km^{2} (48 sq mi)
- Established: 1977
- Governing body: Queensland Parks and Wildlife Service

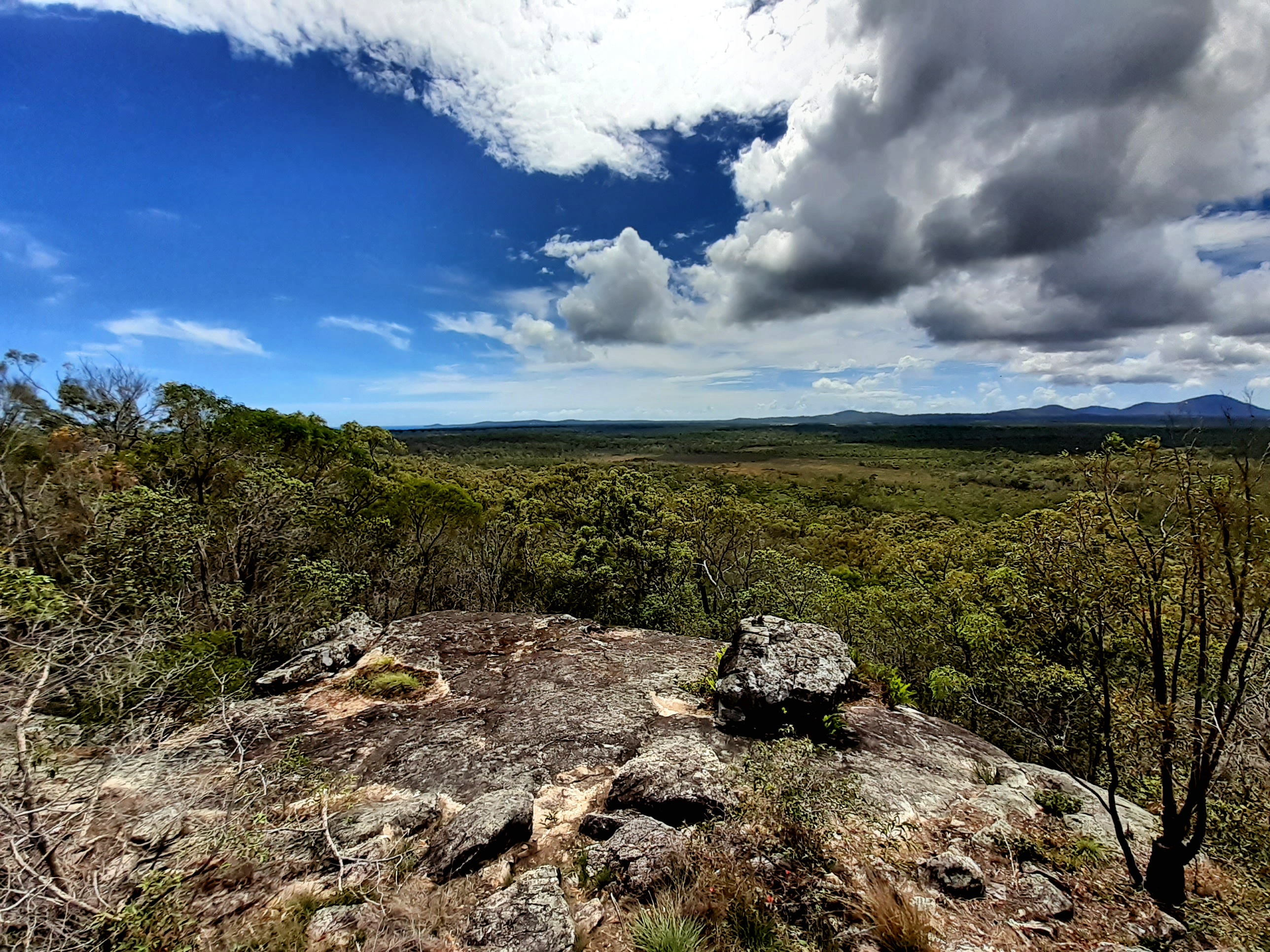
View from the Ganoonga Noonga lookout.

Eurimbula National Park is a protected area in the locality of Eurimbula, Queensland, Australia, in the Gladstone Region near Agnes Water, 411 km north of Brisbane.

== Location and Features ==
The Park is located on the central Queensland coast, nearly 112-km north-west of Bundaberg. The first Europeans to visit the place were Captain James Cook and botanist Sir Joseph Banks. It is covered with diverse vegetation including mangroves, littoral rainforest and coastal vine thickets, freshwater paperbark swamps, eucalypt forests and much more. In addition to 757 species of plants, there is a habitat here for 430 species of animals, of which 26 are on the list of rare or endangered species.

The average elevation of the terrain is 40 metres.

== Visitor facilities ==
Eurimbula National Park consists of three separate sections. The main section is centred on Eurimbula Creek and is accessible (4WD recommended) from the main Agnes Water road. There are camping facilities at Bustard Beach near the mouth of Eurimbula Creek. Inland, a short uphill walk leads to a lookout, known as Ganoonga Noonga, with views of the coast and paperbark swamps of the park. Further north, there is another camping ground at Middle Creek; however, there are no facilities here.

The northern section of the park includes Rodds Peninsula and Bustard Head and its lighthouse; nearby is Jenny Lind Creek. Tours from the Town of 1770 regularly visit Bustard Head; however, Rodds Peninsula is accessible only by private boat. The western section of the park is rugged and extremely difficult to reach.
