= Lowmead, Queensland =

Lowmead
- Town
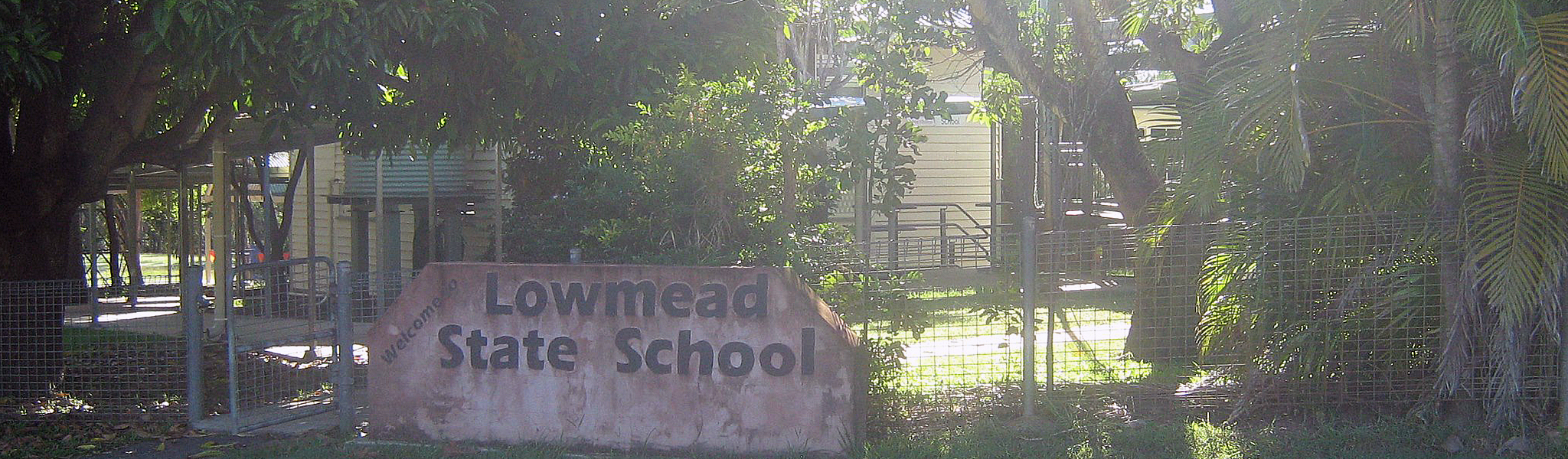
- Lowmead State School, 2023

- Interactive map of Lowmead
- Coordinates: 24.5302°S 151.7527°E
- Country: Australia
- State: Queensland
- LGA: Gladstone Region
- Location: 23.5 km (14.6 mi) NW of Rosedale; 80.0 km (49.7 mi) NW of Bundaberg; 113 km (70 mi) SE of Gladstone; 214 km (133 mi) SE of Rockhampton; 437 km (272 mi) N of Brisbane

Government
  - State electorate: Burnett
  - Federal division: Flynn

Area
  - Total: 333.2 km^{2} (128.6 sq mi)

Population
  - Total: 179 (2021 census)
  - Density: 0.5372/km^{2} (1.391/sq mi)
- Time zone: UTC+10:00 (AEST)
- Postcode: 4676
Localities around Lowmead
Colosseum	Taunton	Mount Maria
Gindoran	Lowmead	Berajondo
Molangul	Kolonga	Rosedale

Lowmead is a rural town and locality in the Gladstone Region, Queensland, Australia. In the 2021 census, the locality of Lowmead had a population of 179 people.

== Geography ==
The town is situated in the north of the locality on the North Coast railway line which passes through the north-east of the locality (entering from Berajondo to the south and exiting to Colosseum to the north). The locality is served by:

- Irkanda railway station (24.4914°S 151.7041°E)
- Baffle railway station (24.5473°S 151.7775°E)

The Bruce Highway passes through the south-west of the locality (entering from Kolonga to the south and exiting to Gindoran to the north).

== History ==
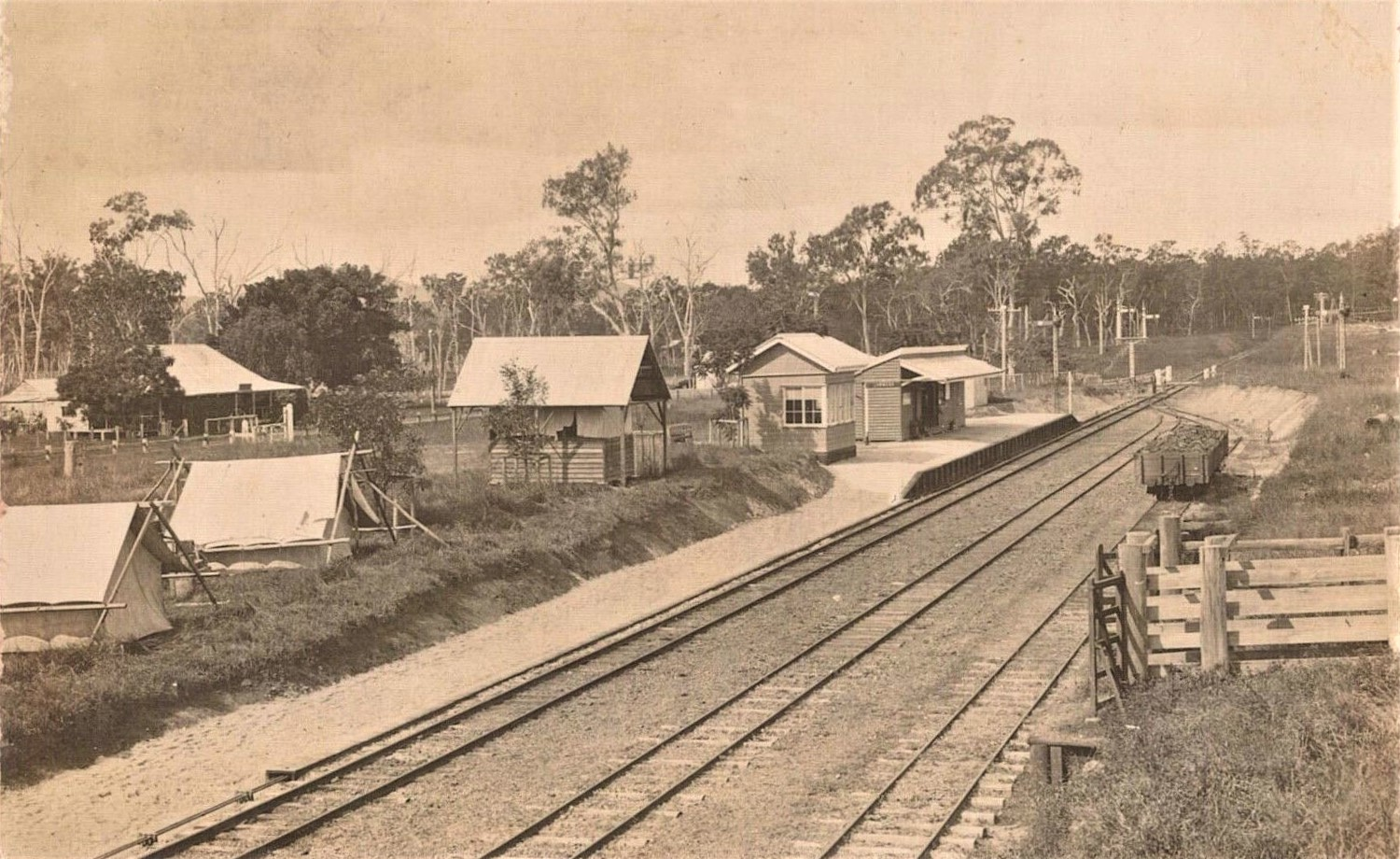
Lowmead railway station, 1916

In 1887, 14,350 acres (5,810 ha) of land were resumed from the Toweran pastoral run. The land was offered for selection for the establishment of small farms on 17 April 1887.

Lowmead Provisional School opened on 20 May 1908. It was upgraded to a State School in 1911. Due to low enrolments, the school closed on 12 December 1975 but reopened 23 January 1978. In January and March 2013, the school was flooded, causing students to miss a number of weeks of school at the start of the school year.

The Lowmead railway station once served the town, but it is now closed. It was west of the junction of Lowmead Road and John Clifford Way (24.52943°S 151.75202°E).

== Demographics ==
In the 2011 census, the locality of Lowmead had a population of 225 people.

In the 2016 census, the locality of Lowmead had a population of 156 people.

In the 2021 census, the locality of Lowmead had a population of 179 people.

== Education ==
Lowmead State School is a government primary (Prep-6) school for boys and girls at 3077-3083 Lowmead Road (24.5244°S 151.7449°E). In 2017, the school had an enrolment of 14 students with 2 teachers (1 full-time equivalent) and 4 non-teaching staff (2 full-time equivalent).

There are no secondary schools in Lowmead. The nearest government secondary schools are Miriam Vale State School (to Year 10) in Miriam Vale to the north-west and Rosedale State School (to Year 12) in neighbouring Rosedale to the east.

== Notable residents ==
- Trevor Coomber, politician
- Daniel Keighran, soldier
