= Mouth of Baffle Creek Conservation Park =

Mouth of Baffle Creek Conservation Parks
- IUCN category III (natural monument or feature)
- Location within Queensland
- Location: Queensland
- Nearest city: Bundaberg
- Coordinates: 24°30′57″S 152°03′24″E
- Area: 3.12 ha (7.7 acres)
- Established: 1990
- Governing body: Queensland Parks and Wildlife Service
- Website: Official website

The Mouth of Baffle Creek Conservation Parks are a series of two protected conservation parks located adjacent to the mouth of the Baffle Creek, on the central coastal region of Queensland, Australia.

The 312-hectare (770-acre) parks are within the Great Barrier Reef Marine Park coastal region. Baffle Creek is one of Queensland's few remaining undisturbed coastal rivers, and the creek's estuary mouth is protected by Mouth of Baffle Creek Regional Park. This small coastal remnant features sandy beaches backed by low, open, eucalypt and she-oak woodlands with a camping area set behind the fore dunes on the creek's northern shore. There is no camping area on the creek's southern side.

The Mouth of Baffle Creek Conservation Park 1 is a 125-hectare (310-acre) park is located on the creek mouth's southern shore and was first gazetted in 1995 to protect an area of mangrove forest. The Mouth of Baffle Creek Conservation Park 2 is a 187-hectare (460-acre) park protects the creek mouth's northern shore and was first gazetted in 1997, with further land protected in 2010.

== See also ==
- Protected areas of Queensland
