= Agnes Water, Queensland =

Agnes Water
- Town
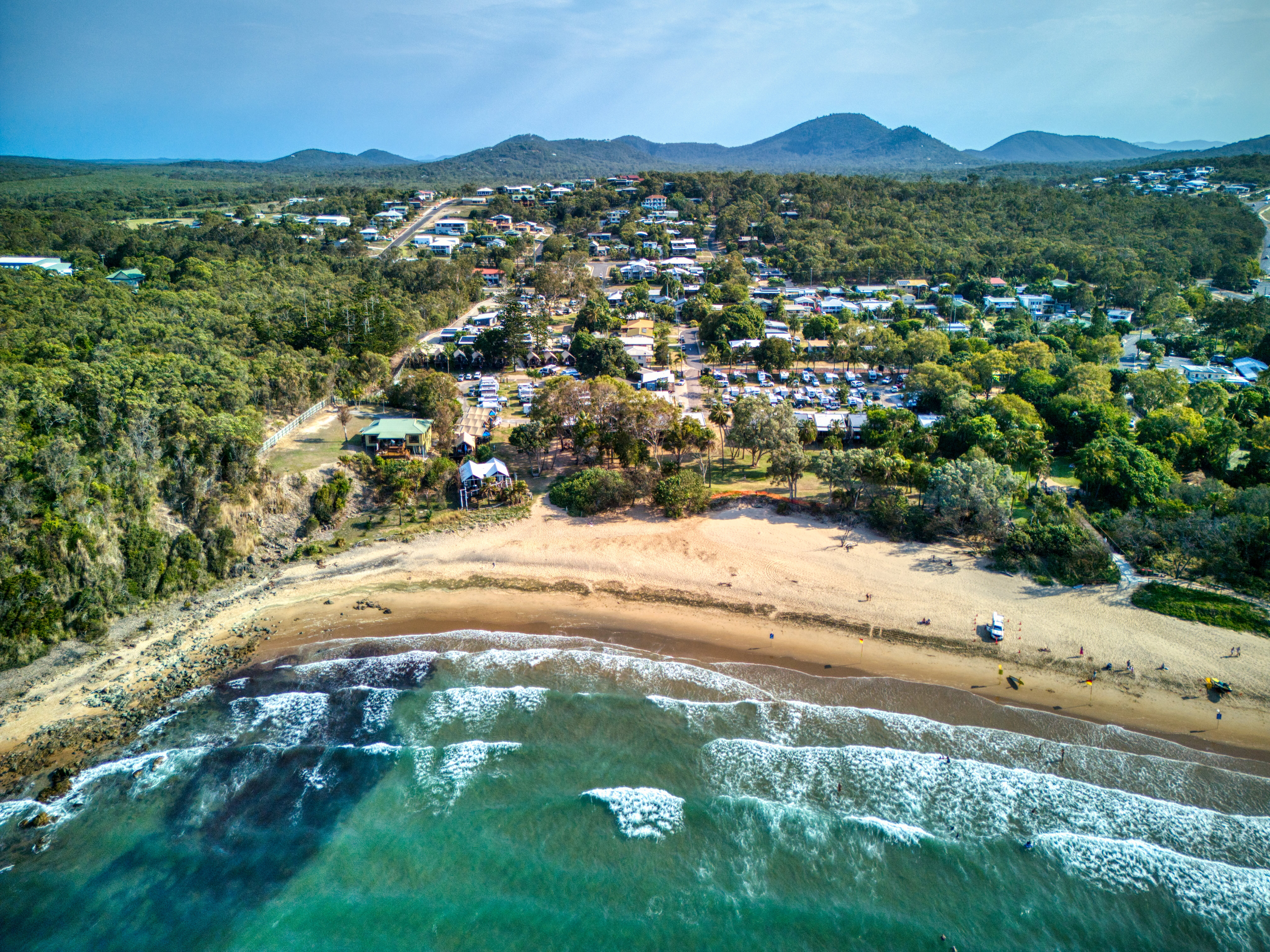
- Beach at Agnes Water, 2024

- Interactive map of Agnes Water
- Coordinates: 24.2125°S 151.9032°E
- Country: Australia
- State: Queensland
- LGA: Gladstone Region
- Location: 122 km (76 mi) NNW of Bundaberg; 123 km (76 mi) SE of Gladstone; 478 km (297 mi) N of Brisbane

Government
  - State electorate: Burnett
  - Federal division: Flynn

Area
  - Total: 58.9 km^{2} (22.7 sq mi)

Population
  - Total: 2,729 (2021 census)
  - Density: 46.33/km^{2} (120.00/sq mi)
- Time zone: UTC+10:00 (AEST)
- Postcode: 4677
Localities around Agnes Water
Seventeen Seventy	Seventeen Seventy	Coral Sea
Eurimbula	Agnes Water	Coral Sea
Round Hill	Round Hill	Deepwater

Agnes Water is a coastal town and a locality in the Gladstone Region, Queensland, Australia. In the 2021 census, the locality of Agnes Water had a population of 2,729.

== History ==
Prior to European settlement Agnes Water was home to the Meerooni tribe who form the southern part of the Gurang nation.

The town of Agnes Water takes its name from a pastoral holding first leased by Daniel Clowes in 1883, which he named after the coastal schooner Agnes, which was lost at sea in the area. The schooner left Bustard Head on 15 June 1873, en route from Mackay to Brisbane. Daniel Clowes remained there until his death in 1891. The gravestones of Clowes and his wife are near the present township.

There was saw milling in the locality in the 1890s and the wide beach was a popular venue, particularly as buggies could be driven onto the beach. It became a holiday destination, and weekend residences were built, notably on Round Hill where the Town of 1770 was officially named in 1936. The population grew slowly initially but gained momentum in the 1980s and 1990s driven by the "sea change" phenomenon.

Agnes Water State School was opened on 29 January 1990.

Agnes Tavern opened in 1993.

Agnes water Mango Tree motel opened in 1982.

The current Agnes Water Public Library opened in 2011 and had a minor refurbishment in 2016.

In 2018, Agnes Water became the first cryptocurrency town. Shops, hotels accept cryptocurrency - Bitcoin, Litecoin, Ethereum and NEM. A review in 2023 showed that tourists did make use of cryptocurrency payments in the first six months, thought to be linked to the novelty of doing so due to the publicity. However, use of cryptocurrency payments fell after that.

== Demographics ==
In the 2011 census, the locality of Agnes Water had a population of 1,814 people. This figure is made up of 942 males and 872 females with a median age of 41. The town's most common ancestries are English (32.4%), Australian (29.6%), Scottish (8.6%), Irish (7.8%) and German (4.8%).

In the 2016 census, the locality of Agnes Water had a population of 2,210 people.

In the 2021 census, the locality of Agnes Water had a population of 2,729 people.

== Religion ==
The area of Agnes Water has two local churches - the Agnes Water Baptist Church and the Catholic Church. Both are located on Bicentennial Dve, a short drive from the centre of the area. Census data from 2011 shows that 32.3% of the population do not identify with a religion while 19.6% list Anglican as their religion, followed by Catholicism (16.1%).

== Geography ==
Agnes Water is in Central Queensland approximately 80 kilometres (50 mi) south-east of the Bruce Highway, Queensland's major coastal route. It is accessed via the main road called Round Hill Road. It is 90 minutes south of Gladstone, and 90 minutes north of Bundaberg on the Discovery Coast. Agnes Water is the closest access point to the Great Barrier Reef. It is a neighbouring town of the Town of 1770.

Much of the area's natural beauty has been preserved through the establishment of Eurimbula National Park, covering more than 23,000 hectares and the nearby Joseph Banks Environmental Park, located on the headland originally known as Round Head.

== Education ==
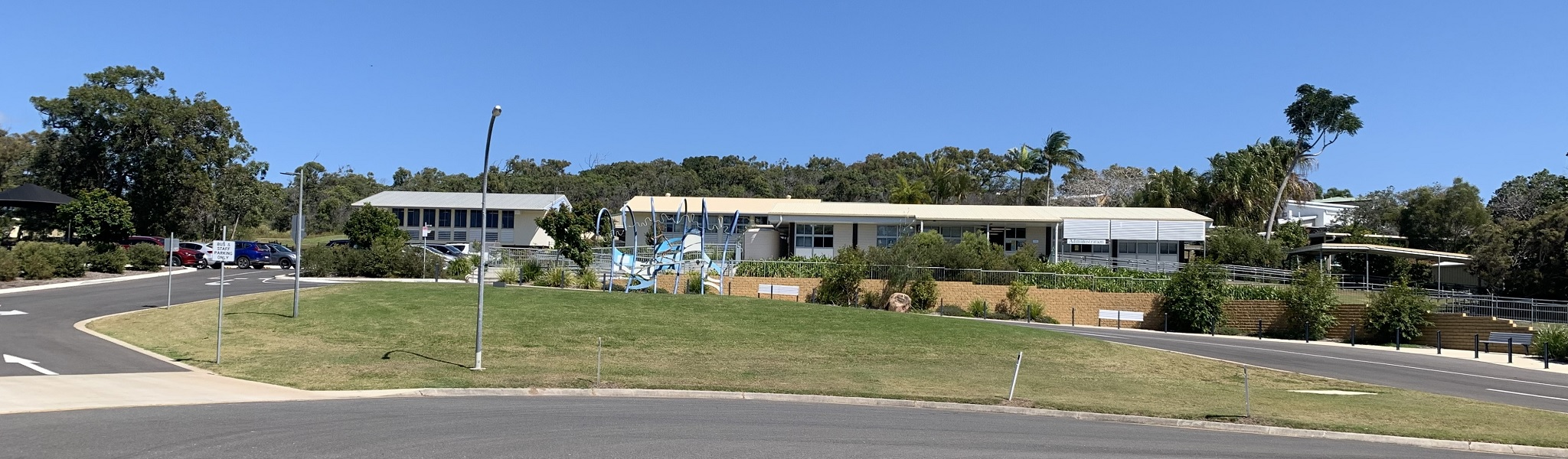
Agnes Water State School, 2022

Agnes Water State School is a government primary (Prep–6) school for boys and girls. In 2017, the school had an enrolment of 215 students with 19 teachers (15 full-time equivalent) and 14 non-teaching staff (8 full-time equivalent).

The nearest government secondary school is Rosedale State School in Rosedale, 64 kilometres (40 mi) away from the centre of Agnes Water, accessed mostly by local buses that travel the route daily.

Goora Gan Steiner School is a private primary (Prep–6) school for boys and girls that opened in January 2017. In 2017, the school had an enrolment of 12 students with 2 teachers and 1 non-teaching staff.

Discovery Christian College is a private primary and secondary (Prep–12) school for boys and girls that opened in 2015. In 2017, the school had an enrolment of 160 students with 18 teachers (15 full-time equivalent) and 12 non-teaching staff (5 full-time equivalent).

Only 7.1% of the population during the 2011 census listed their education level as being over secondary school (i.e. tertiary or further education).

== Facilities ==
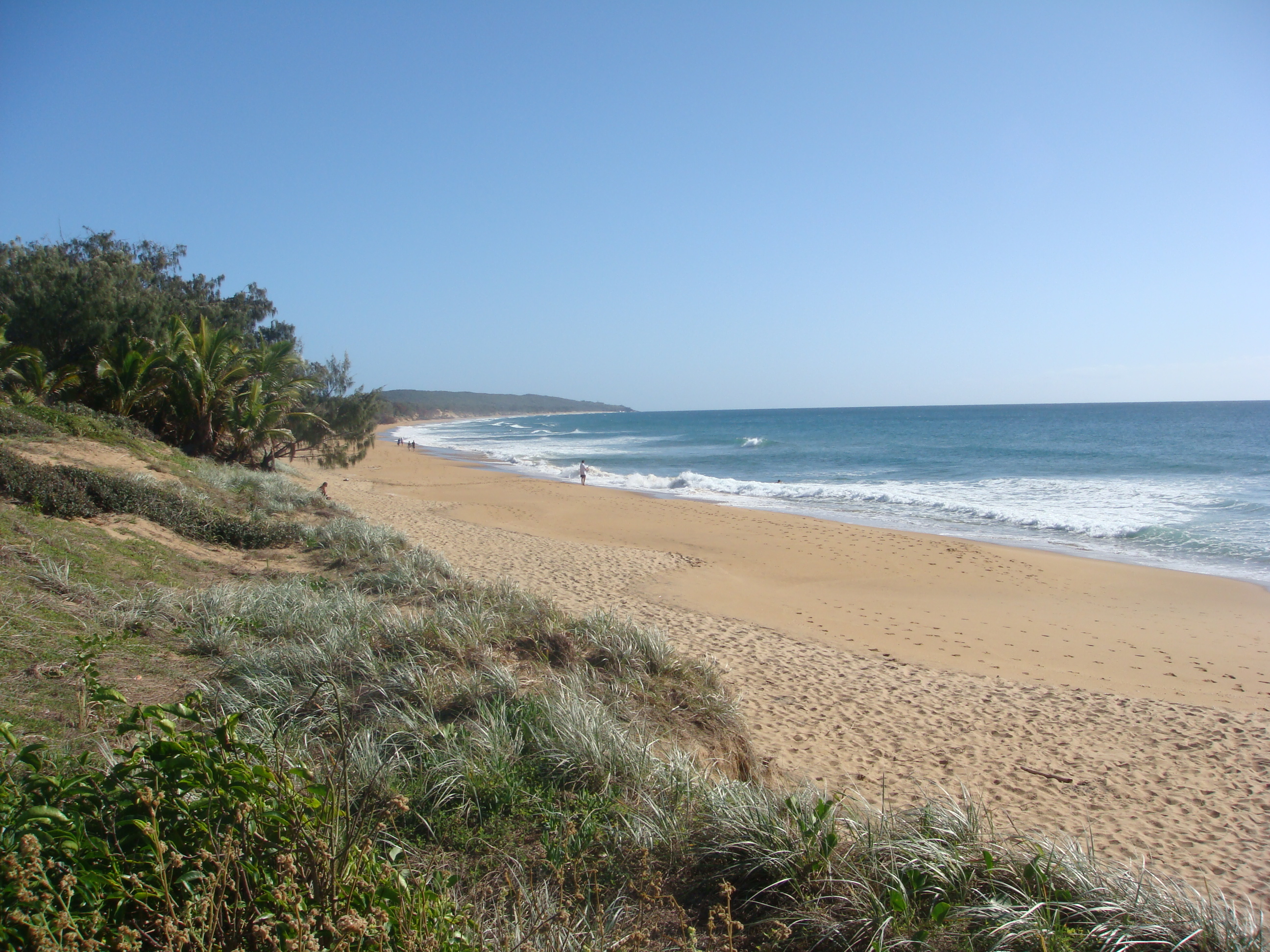
Agnes Water beach, 2009

The town has a visitor information centre on Round Hill Road. The town also hosts a community centre, coastal camping reserve, life-saving club, state primary school (1990), and a museum which houses the Miriam Vale Historical Society. The Agnes Water Library is at 71 Springs Road and is operated by the Gladstone Regional Council.

The local tourism and commerce group has created a website listing the natural attractions and all things to do while visiting the region.

Despite the name, Agnes Water Ambulance Station is at 2385 Round Hill Road in neighbouring Round Hill (24.2416°S 151.8638°E). The Agnes Water Ambulance station has 5 paramedics. The officer-in-charge Brett Schultz has served the Agnes Community for over ten years.

== Creative community ==
The 1770 Art Show which takes places each year in May. The town is also the inspiration behind the song "Sweet Agnes" released in 2022 by the band Railmotor. The album was recorded in Agnes Water over two weeks in June 2022.

== Attractions ==
Agnes Water is also home to one of Australia's most highly awarded tea companies, Tielka.
