= Baffle Creek, Queensland =

Baffle Creek
- Suburb
- Interactive map of Baffle Creek
- Coordinates: 24.4888°S 151.9250°E
- Country: Australia
- State: Queensland
- LGA: Gladstone Region
- Location: 31.4 km (19.5 mi) N of Rosedale; 88 km (55 mi) NNW of Bundaberg; 118 km (73 mi) SSE of Gladstone; 219 km (136 mi) SSE of Rockhampton; 442 km (275 mi) N of Brisbane

Government
  - State electorate: Burnett
  - Federal division: Division of Flynn

Area
  - Total: 47.0 km^{2} (18.1 sq mi)

Population
  - Total: 155 (2021 census)
  - Density: 3.298/km^{2} (8.54/sq mi)
- Time zone: UTC+10:00 (AEST)
- Postcode: 4674
Suburbs around Baffle Creek
Oyster Creek	Deepwater	Rules Beach
Euleilah	Baffle Creek	Rules Beach
Euleilah	Rosedale	Winfield

Baffle Creek is a rural locality in the Gladstone Region, Queensland, Australia. In the 2021 census, Baffle Creek had a population of 155 people.

The neighbourhood of Wartburg is within the locality (24°30′07″S 151°55′52″E).

== Geography ==
Baffle Creek (the watercourse) forms the southern and south-western boundaries.

== History ==
The area on Baffle Creek was first settled in 1908 by Prussian and German immigrants who were recruited by Apostle. H. F. Niemeyer of the Apostolic Church of Queensland in Hatton Vale near Ipswich. The government land orders they had expected to receive were not available, so they had to wait for six months living on a hill that they called Wartburg meaning waiting place.

In 1911, a sugar mill was built by Albert Kleinschmidt (who had another sugar mill in Bundaberg). The mill produced brown sugar which was taken elsewhere for further refining. The mill was closed in 1919 as it was not a successful venture.

Wartburg State School opened on 11 August 1913.

In 1921, a shop storeroom off the Coast Road was remodelled to become St Paul's Lutheran Church. It was officially opened on Sunday 17 July 1921. It was 10 miles (16 km) from Rosedale near the Baffle Creek. It is on the south-western corner of the Coast Road and Bayfield Road leading to the creek (24.5045°S 151.9299°E). The church bell was installed in 1923. The church was enlarged and the bell tower was remodelled in 1947.

On 26 November 2018, the Queensland Government ordered the evacuation of Baffle Creek, Deepwater and Rules Beach due to a "dangerous and unpredictable" bushfire 50-kilometre (31 mi) wide and covering 5,000 hectares (12,000 acres) with flames of 10 to 12 metres (33 to 39 ft) high during an extreme heatwave.

== Demographics ==
In the 2011 census, Baffle Creek had a population too low to separately report and was aggregated with the neighbouring locality of Deepwater which had a combined population of 548 people.

In the 2016 census, Baffle Creek had a population of 156 people.

In the 2021 census, Baffle Creek had a population of 155 people.

== Heritage listings ==
Baffle Creek has a number of heritage-listed sites, including:

- Baffle Creek Sugar Mill (remains), Coast Road
- St Pauls's Lutheran Church, Coast Road

== Education ==
Wartburg State School is a government primary (Early Childhood - Year 6) school for boys and girls at 585 Coast Road in Baffle Creek (24.5024°S 151.9309°E). In 2013, the school had 55 students and 4 teachers (3 full-time equivalent). In 2023, the school had 19 students.

There are no secondary schools in Baffle Creek. The nearest government secondary school is Rosedale State School (to Year 12) in neighbouring Rosedale to the south.
