= Baffle Creek =

Baffle
- Location of Baffle Creek river mouth in Queensland
- Etymology: Baffle (verb)

Location
- Country: Australia
- State: Queensland
- Region: Central Queensland

Physical characteristics
- Source: Edinburgh Range
  - location: Eurimbula
  - coordinates: 24.19472°S 151.64104°E
  - elevation: 373 m (1,224 ft)
- Mouth: Mouth of Baffle Creek Conservation Park
  - location: Coral Sea, Australia
  - coordinates: 24.52972°S 152.03806°E
  - elevation: 0 m (0 ft)
- Length: 124 km (77 mi)
- Basin size: 2,541.2 km^{2} (981.2 sq mi)
- Discharge
  - location: Near mouth
  - average: 9.75 m^{3}/s (308 GL/a)

Basin features
- Tributaries
  - left: Island Creek (Queensland), Euleilah Creek
  - right: Granite Creek (Queensland), Three Mile Creek (Queensland), Scrubby Creek, Grevillea Creek
- Islands: Grants Island; Long Island

The Baffle Creek is a creek in Central Queensland, Australia.

== Course and features ==
The Baffle Creek rises in the Edinburgh Range near Arthurs Seat in the Eurimbula National Park. The 124-kilometre (77 mi) creek flows initially southward, hemmed to the west by the Westwood Range and to the east by Dromedary Mountain. The creek continues south crossed by the Bruce Highway just east of Miriam Vale and then turns south east forming braided channels near Sonoma and hemmed to the east by the Gwynne Range resulting in the formation of one named island, Grants Island. It then is crossed by the Bruce Highway again and turns east under Mount Maria then north and flows through the Mouth of Baffle Creek Conservation Park and finally discharges into the Coral Sea south of Rules Beach and northeast of Winfield. At its mouth the creek again forms an anabranch around Long Island.

The catchment area of the creek occupies an 4,084 square kilometres (1,577 sq mi) of which an area of 134 square kilometres (52 sq mi) is composed of estuarine wetlands.

== Etymology ==
The creek was named in the 1850s by the pastoralist and politician, William Henry Walsh, during an expedition led by him to track an Aboriginal raiding party into the bush. The footprints of the raiders disappeared in the dense bush along the creek banks leading the party unable to follow them further and leading Walsh to name the creek as Baffle Creek.

== See also ==
- List of rivers of Australia § Queensland
