= Rosedale, Queensland =

Rosedale
- Town
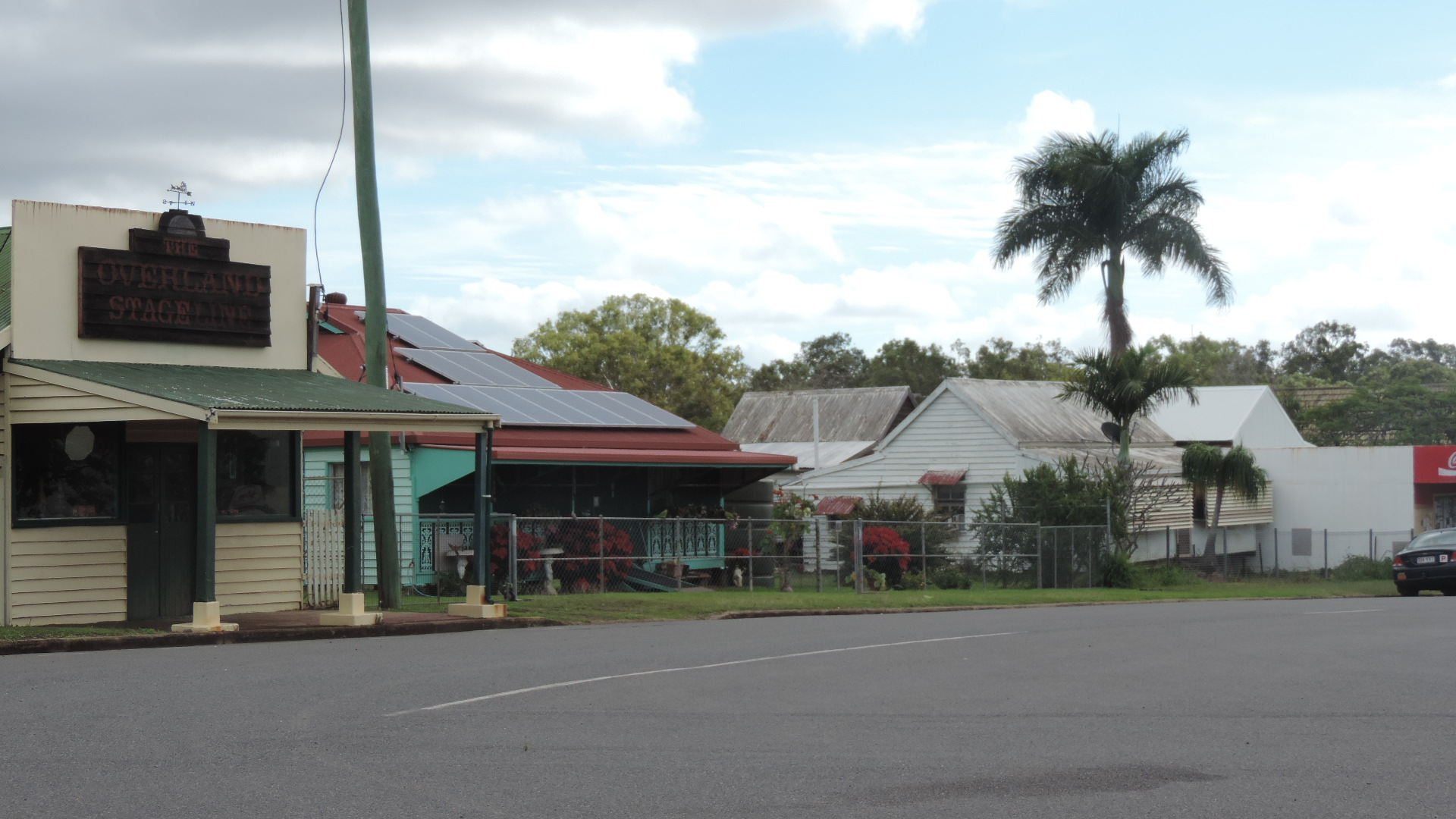
- Rosedale, 2016

- Interactive map of Rosedale
- Coordinates: 24.6286°S 151.9141°E
- Country: Australia
- State: Queensland
- LGAs: Gladstone Region; Bundaberg Region
- Location: 59.0 km (36.7 mi) NW of Bundaberg CBD; 61.3 km (38.1 mi) SE of Miriam Vale; 130 km (81 mi) SSE of Gladstone CBD; 418 km (260 mi) NNW of Brisbane

Government
  - State electorates: Burnett; Callide
  - Federal division: Flynn

Area
  - Total: 374.7 km^{2} (144.7 sq mi)

Population
  - Total: 452 (2021 census)
  - Density: 1.2063/km^{2} (3.124/sq mi)
- Time zone: UTC+10:00 (AEST)
- Postcode: 4674
Localities around Rosedale
| Euleilah; Mount Maria | Baffle Creek | Winfield |
| Berajondo | Rosedale | Watalgan |
| Lowmead; Lake Monduran | Monduran | Waterloo |

Rosedale is a rural town and locality split between the Gladstone Region and the Bundaberg Region in central Queensland, Australia. In the 2021 census, the locality of Rosedale had a population of 452 people.

== Geography ==
The town is 423 kilometres (263 mi) north of the state capital Brisbane and 58 kilometres (36 mi) north west of the regional centre of Bundaberg. The town is on the North Coast railway line.

Most of the locality is in the Gladstone Region but a small southern part on the shores of Lake Monduran is in the Bundaberg Region. Despite the town itself being in the Gladstone Region local government area, Rosedale is closer to Bundaberg than Gladstone. There has been some interest in the Rosedale community regarding breaking away from the Gladstone Region.

In the east of the locality are the Littabella Conservation Park (which extends into neighbouring Watalgan) and the Littabella National Park (which extends into neighbouring Waterloo and Monduran). In the south-east of the locality is the Monduran State Forest which extends into neighbouring Monduran.

== History ==
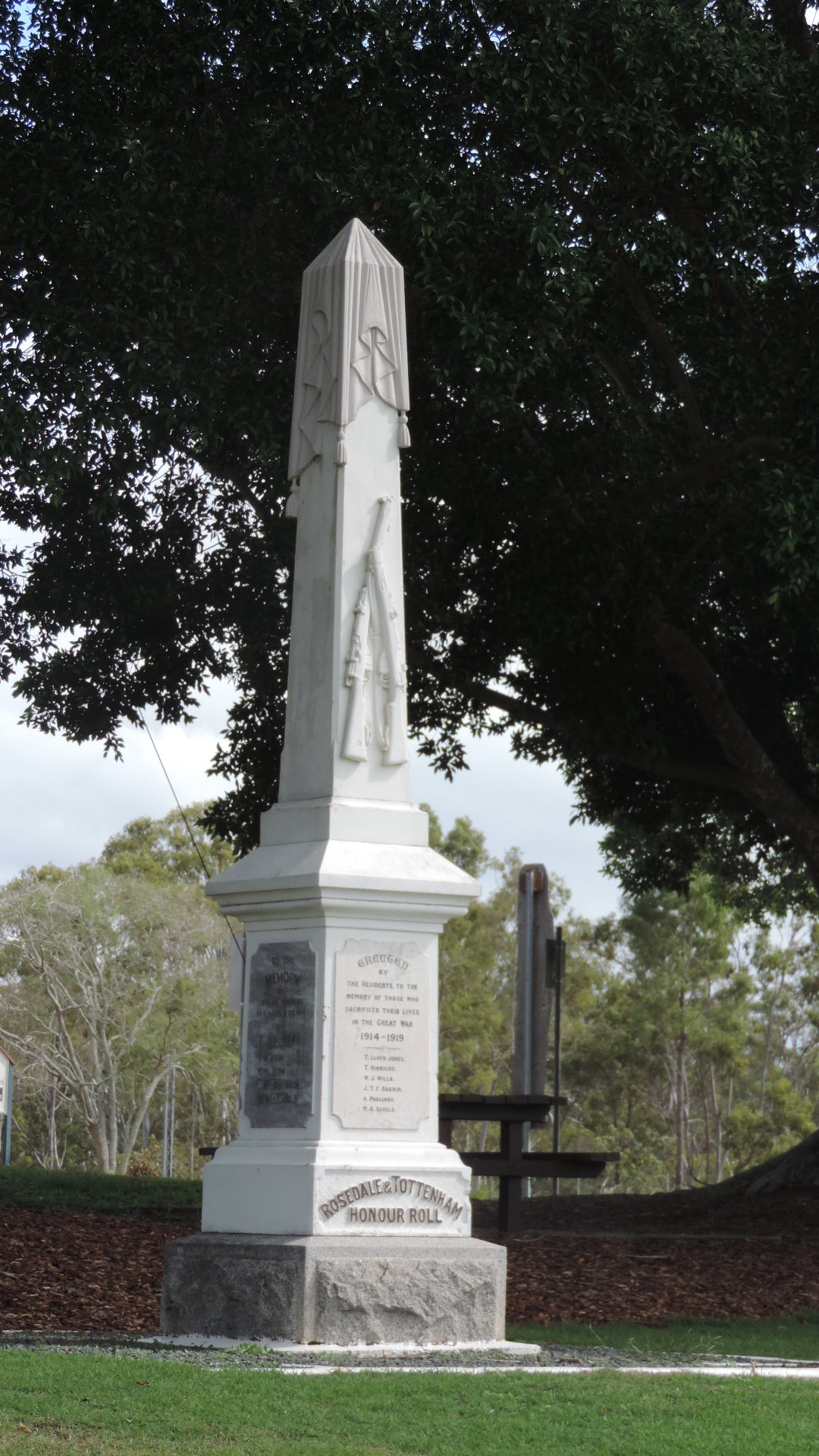
Rosedale and Tottenham War Memorial, 2016

In July 1853, John Little and his family made camp with their large herd of sheep overlanded from New South Wales and selected a site overlooking a large creek (now known as Baffle Creek). John Little's wife, Catherine, suggested the name "Rosedale" for the property and a vertical slab house, stock yards, sheep pens and "other barricades against the blacks" was constructed in 1854. Lieutenant John Murray of the Native Police married John Little's daughter, Rachel. After a raid by the Native Police, the Murray family adopted an Aboriginal child who was found in a hollow log. On one occasion, the Littles themselves surprised "a large tribe of blacks..surprising them by discharging our firearms in the midst of them". On 29 August 1863 John Little was struck by a falling limb from a burning tree and died the next day. A headstone marks the grave sites on the property. Rosedale Station remained in the Little family until approximately 1979.

From the late 19th century, closer settlement of Rosedale began with selectors taking up subdivisions of land.

Rosedale Provisional School opened on 6 July 1896. On 1 January 1909 it became Rosedale State School. In 1964 a secondary department was added.

On Tuesday 13 December 1920 the Rosedale and Tottenham war memorial commemorating the fallen in World War I was unveiled by John Fletcher, the Member of the Queensland Legislative Assembly for Port Curtis before a crowd of about 300 people.

In 2004, a north-bound tilt train derailed injuring 120 passengers.

== Demographics ==
In the 2011 census, the localityof Rosedale and the surrounding area had a population of 448 people.

In the 2016 census, the locality of Rosedale had a population of 438 people.

In the 2021 census, the locality of Rosedale had a population of 452 people.

== Education ==
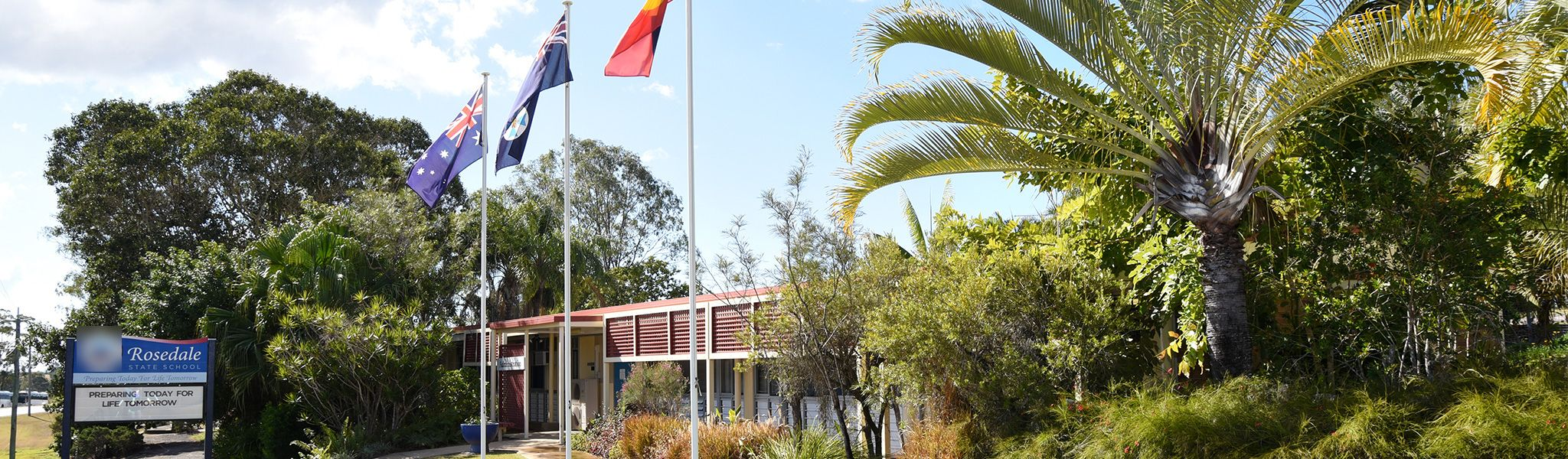
Rosedale State School, 2025

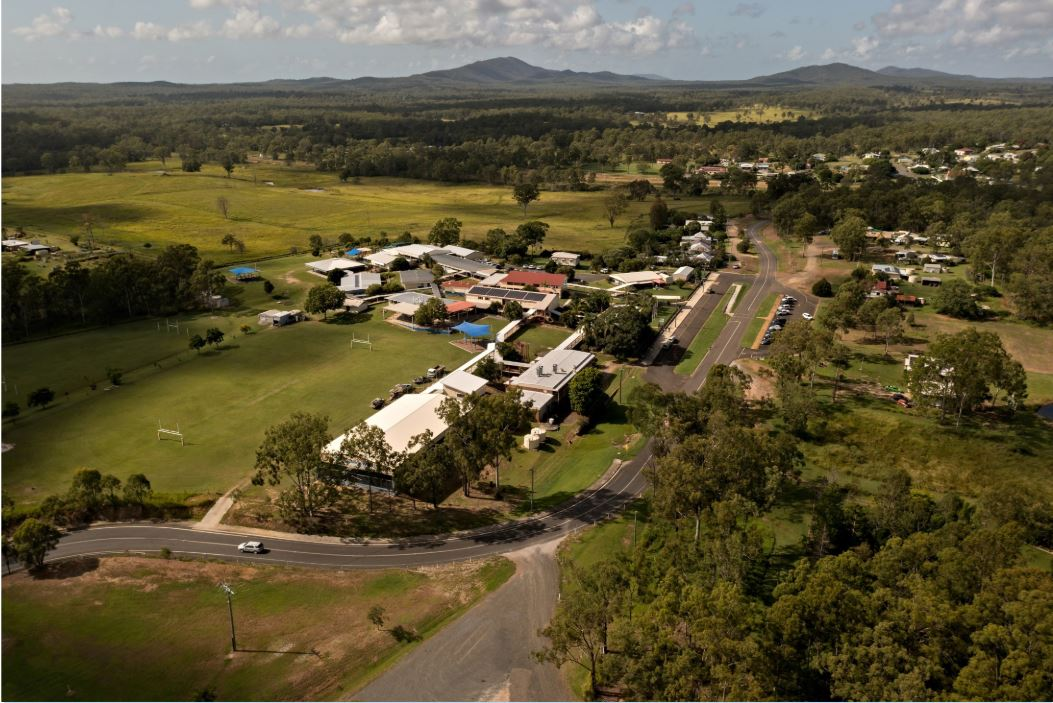
Rosedale State School, 2023

Rosedale State School is a government primary and secondary (Prep–12) school for boys and girls at 21 James Street (24.6237°S 151.9147°E). In 2018, the school had an enrolment of 243 students with 30 teachers (26 full-time equivalent) and 26 non-teaching staff (16 full-time equivalent). It includes a special education program. The school also serves students from nearby localities.

== Facilities ==
Rosedale Police Station is at 14 McPherson Street (24.6304°S 151.9147°E).

Rosedale SES Facility is at 2 Callaghan Street (24.6310°S 151.9148°E).

The Rosedale cemetery is located north of the town in Ferry Road (24.6009°S 151.9151°E) and is operated by the Gladstone Regional Council.

The Rosedale Baffle Creek Cemetery (also known as Flinders Cemetery) is in Barnetts Road (24.5207°S 151.9567°E).

== Amenities ==
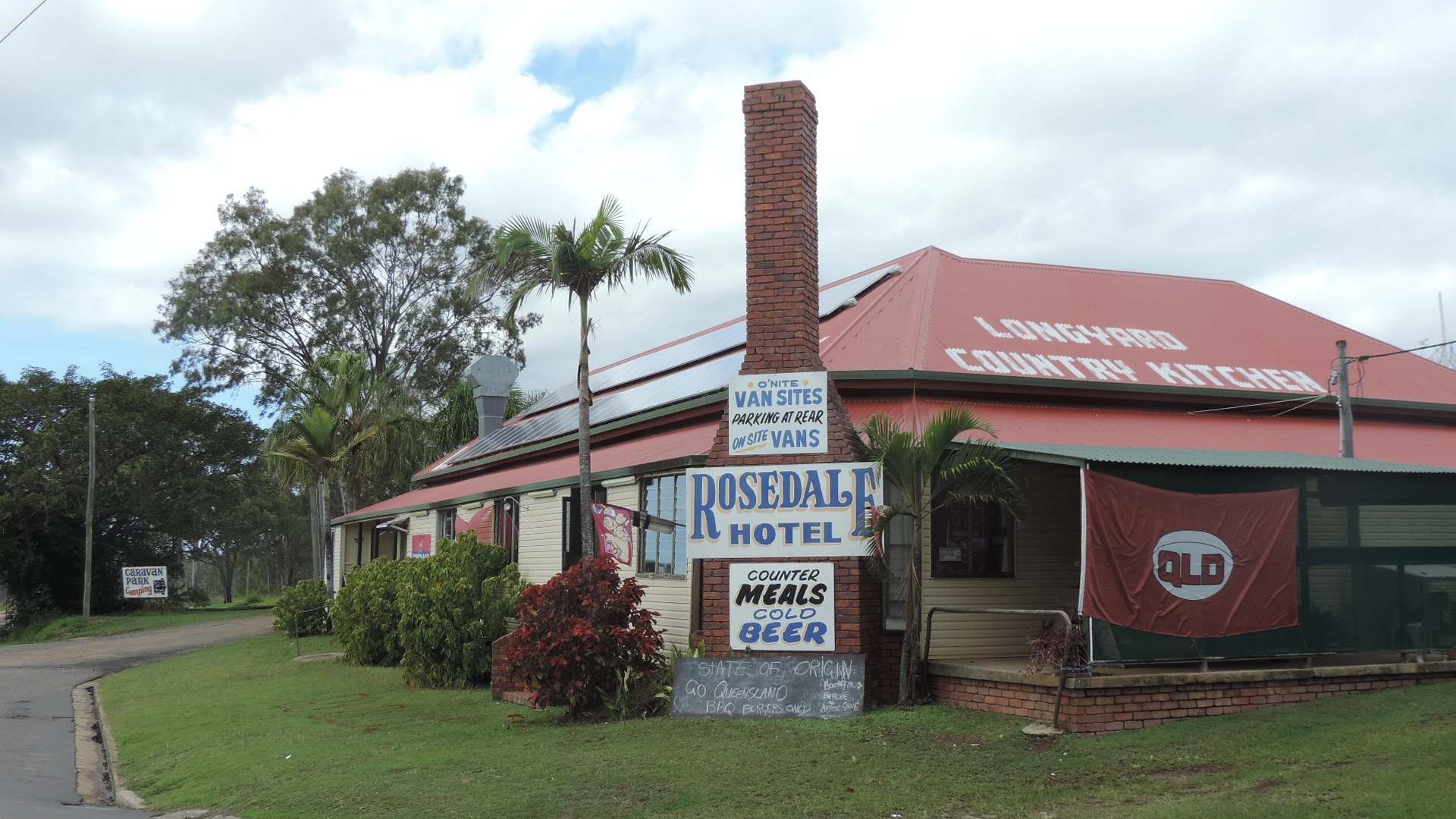
Rosedale Hotel, 2016

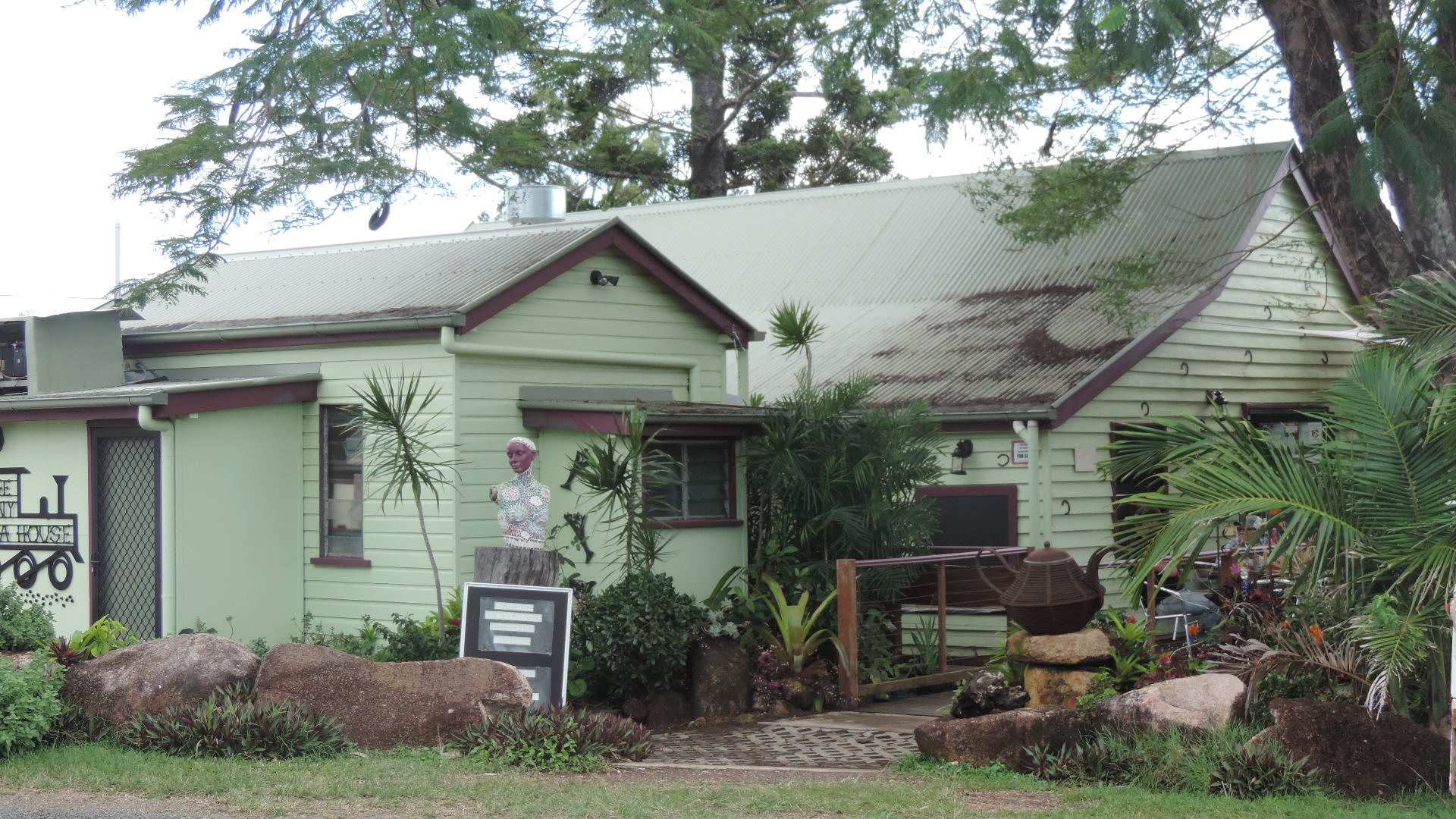
The Tiny Tea House, 2016

Facilities in the town include a pub, a tea house and a general store.

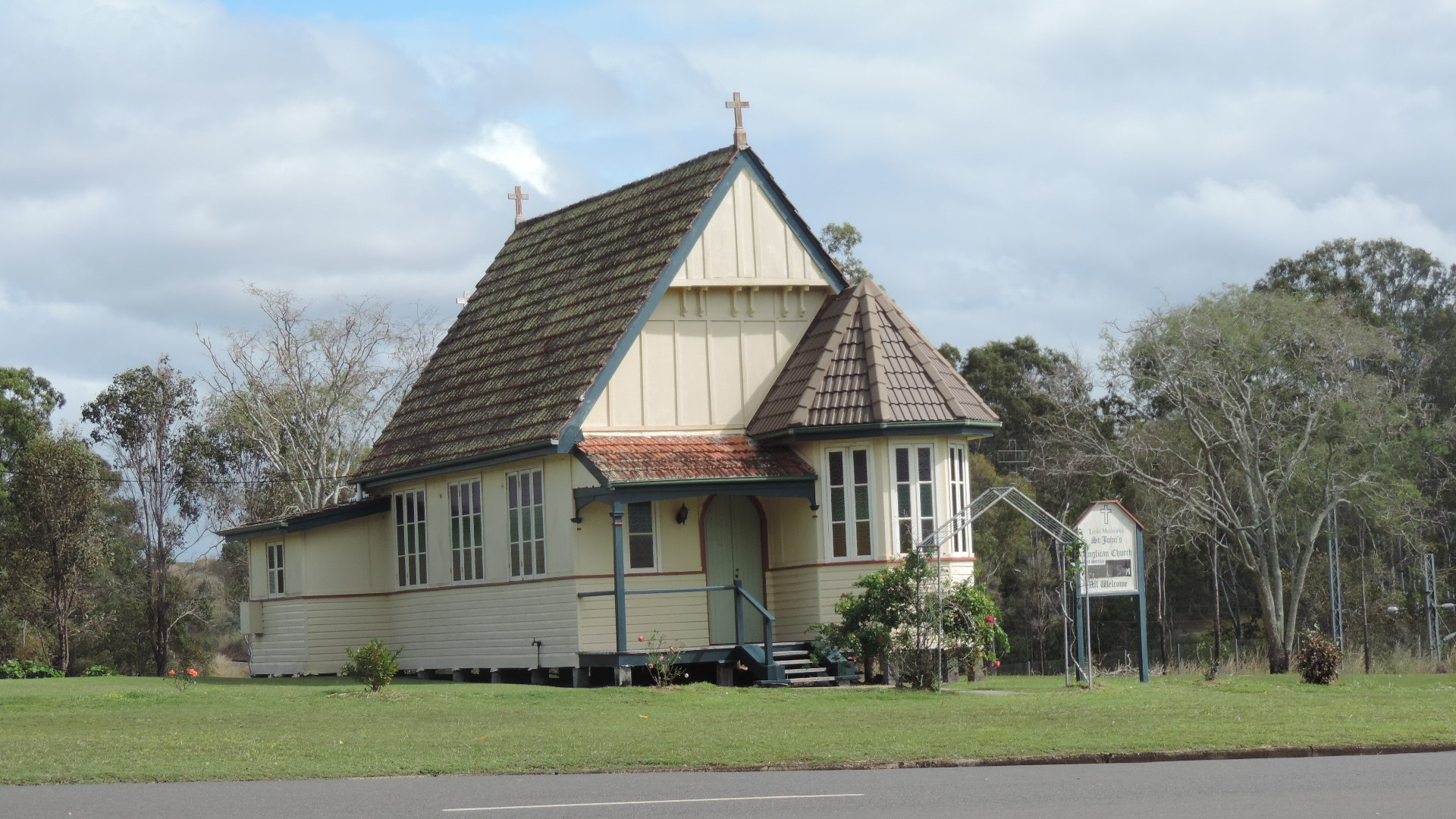
St John's Anglican Church, 2016

St John's Community Church is privately owned and located in James Street.

The Rosedale branch of the Queensland Country Women's Association meets at 13 McPherson Street (24.6304°S 151.9140°E).

The Rosedale and Tottenham war memorial commemorating the fallen in World War I and World War II is located in James Street, beside the Memorial Hall.
