= Gladstone–Monto Road =

Road in Queensland, Australia

Gladstone–Monto Road Queensland

General information
- Type: Rural road
- Length: 132 km (82 mi)
- Route number(s): State Route 69

Major junctions
- North-east end: Dawson Highway (State Route 60), Calliope
- Kalpowar Road
- South-west end: Burnett Highway (A3), Monto

Location(s)
- Major settlements: Nagoorin, Ubobo, Builyan, Many Peaks, Kalpowar, Mungungo

Gladstone–Monto Road is a 132 kilometres (82 mi) road route in the Gladstone and North Burnett regions of Queensland, Australia. The entire route is signed as State Route 69.

The Gladstone–Monto Road (number 471) is a state-controlled district road, rated as a local road of regional significance (LRRS).

== Route description ==
The road commences at an intersection with the Dawson Highway in Calliope, a locality to the south-west of Gladstone. It soon turns south and then south-east, following the valley of the Boyne River through the localities of Taragoola, Wooderson, Diglum and Boynedale. It skirts the south-western edge of Lake Awoonga before reaching the locality of Boyne Valley. That locality contains four small towns: Nagoorin, Ubobo, Builyan, and Many Peaks.

At Builyan the road turns west, following Glassford Creek. Just west of Many Peaks it passes through Glassford State Forest and turns south-west through Kalpowar, where it passes the exit to Kalpowar Road (see below) to the north-east, to Bancroft. In this section it crosses from the Boyne River catchment to the Burnett River catchment. It then turns north-west to Mungungo, where it meets Monal Creek. Turning south-west it follows that creek through Bukali to Monto.

The road enters Monto as Lister Street, where it ends at an intersection with the Burnett Highway.

== History of Calliope roads ==
Gold was discovered in the area in 1862, and a settlement soon followed with a Post Office in 1864 and a school in 1872.

Calliope was the name of a pastoral run in the district from 1887 to 1908, and Upper Calliope was a separate property from 1869 to 1901. At some point parts of these runs were made available for selection of smaller lots.

The presence of rich farming land to the south, first along Poison Creek and other tributaries of the Calliope River, and then along the valley of the Boyne River soon led to closer settlement, and to the need for roads to support this expansion.

Basic roads were constructed as far as Boyne Valley, and these were the only means of transportation of goods until the arrival of the Byellee to Monto railway line in Many Peaks in 1910.

== History of Monto roads ==
Europeans settled in the area from the 1840s, maintaining large pastoral holdings. Gold was discovered in the 1870s, and in 1881 the first school opened. When gold reserves dwindled the activities of logging and farming became predominant. One such farming area was to the north-east, along Monal Creek, in what are now the localities of Bukali and Mungungo.

When Monto was declared a town in 1924 it was not yet connected to the rail network, and it was about 200 kilometres (120 mi) from the nearest port over poor roads. A rail connection to the south-east finally arrived in 1928, but locals continued to press for completion of the line from the north-east as it represented a shorter route. By the time this was completed in 1931 a road had been constructed through the rugged section between Mungungo and Boyne Valley, completing the link via Calliope to Gladstone.

== Road status and upgrade projects ==
In about 2006 the then Monto Shire Council stated in an assessment of the suitability of the road as a freight corridor to the Port of Gladstone:

The road is 57 kilometres (35 mi) shorter than the current sealed link via Biloela. Approximately 36 kilometres (22 mi) of the road remains unsealed. Much of the unsealed section is characterised by sharp curves, steep gradients, inadequate sight distances, flood-ways and narrow formation width.

Since the Awoonga Dam was raised to its present level in 2006 the waters of the dam, when at its designated "full" level, reach the edge of the road between Boyne Valley and Calliope. When a flood rain event occurs the lake can rise up to 8 metres (26 ft) above that level, and the road can be cut for several weeks. In 2013 the State Government pledged $1.3 million to build a bypass road, but the Gladstone Regional Council was unwilling to bear the expected additional cost of about $0.7 million.

In November 2019 work commenced on widening a section of this road between Nagoorin and Ubobo, with completion expected in January 2020 (weather permitting). The outcome of this project was to be a two-lane sealed surface for the whole of the road.

In 2020 the Queensland Trucking Association rated a bridge over Splinter Creek between Bancroft and Kalpowar as the eighth-worst bridge in the state.

In 2021 the repair of nine floodways was completed at a cost of $14 million.

== Kalpowar Road ==
Kalpowar Road
- Location: Bruce Highway, Kolonga to Gladstone–Monto Road, Kalpowar
- Length: 50.9 km (31.6 mi)

Kalpowar Road is a state-controlled district road (number 4702), rated as a local road of regional significance (LRRS). It runs from the Bruce Highway at Kolonga to Gladstone–Monto Road in Kalpowar, a distance of 50.9 kilometres (31.6 mi). This road has no major intersections.

== Major Intersections ==
All distances are from Google Maps.

| LGA | Location | km | mi | Destinations | Notes |
|---|---|---|---|---|---|
| Gladstone | Calliope | 0 | 0.0 | Dawson Highway (State Route 60) northeast – Gladstone / northwest – Mount Alma, Biloela | North eastern end of Gladstone–Monto Road. Continues south-west as State Route 69 |
| North Burnett | Kalpowar | 94.0 | 58.4 | Kalpowar Road – east – Kolonga, Bruce Highway | |
| North Burnett | Monto | 132.0 | 82.0 | Burnett Highway (A3) south – Three Moon, Mulgildie / northwest – Moonford, Coominglah, Biloela | South western end of Gladstone–Monto Road (State Route 69) |
1.000 mi = 1.609 km; 1.000 km = 0.621 mi

== See also ==
- List of road routes in Queensland
- Calliope River Historical Village
- Glassford Creek Smelter Sites
- Mungar Junction to Monto railway line
- Byellee to Monto railway line
- Soldier Settler House, Ubobo
- Glengarry Homestead
- List of numbered roads in Queensland
