= Soldier Settler House, Ubobo =

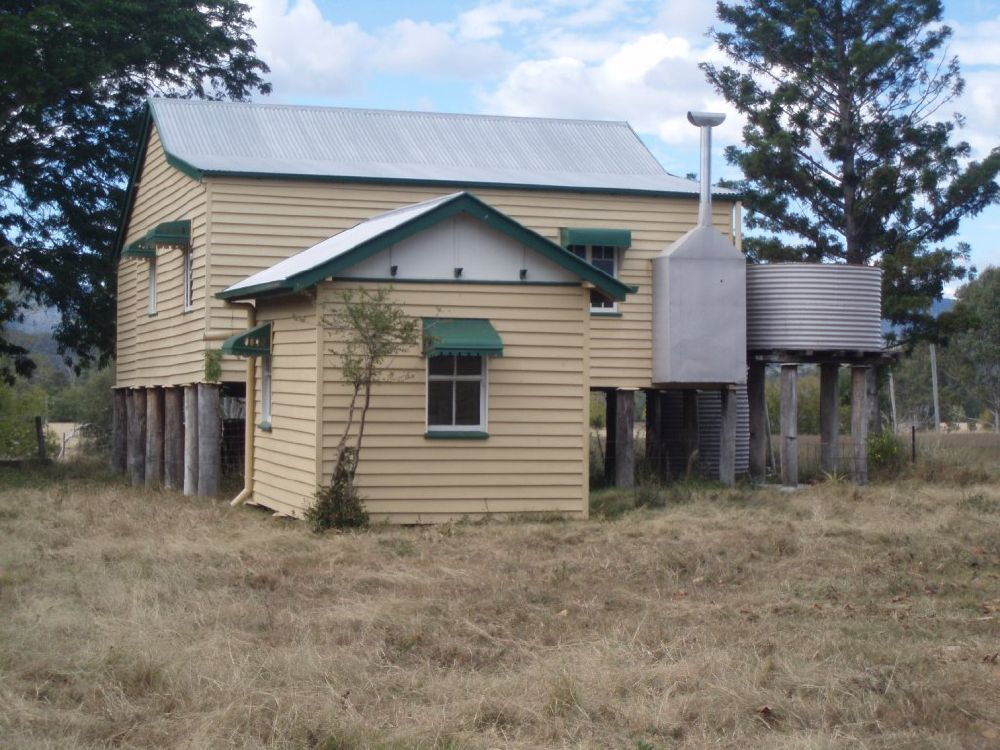
- Soldier Settler House, 2009

- Location within Queensland Location within Australia
- 24.3983°S 151.3323°E
- Location: Gladstone-Monto Road, Ubobo, Gladstone Region, Queensland, Australia

History
- Design period: 1919–1930s (interwar period)
- Built: 1920

Queensland Heritage Register
- Official name: Soldier Settler House, Hecstanvale
- Type: state heritage (built)
- Designated: 28 September 2001
- Reference no.: 602229
- Significant period: 1920s (fabric); 1920s-1940s (historical)
- Significant components: out building/s, trees/plantings, farmhouse

Soldier Settler House is a heritage-listed homestead at Gladstone-Monto Road, Ubobo, Gladstone Region, Queensland, Australia. It was built in 1920. It is also known as Hecstanvale. It was added to the Queensland Heritage Register on 28 September 2001.

== History ==
The soldier settlers house is a high-set, timber building constructed in 1920, on property owned by RS Davies. An ex-serviceman from World War I, Davies had acquired title to Portion 115 (as it was known) under the Ubobo Soldier Settlement Scheme. In the 1960s, the Davies family purchased Lot 114 (formerly Portion 114), on which another soldier settler's house is located. Non-Indigenous exploration of Boyne Valley area commenced with Captain James Cook in 1770, Matthew Flinders (who named Port Curtis) in 1802 and John Oxley in 1823. More systematic inland exploration in the area had been led from the mid-1840s by Ludwig Leichhardt and Thomas Mitchell. By the early 1850s there were many squatters seeking to take up pastoral properties on the northern frontier of the Burnett District.

In June 1853, a government survey party under Francis McCabe was established at the Port Curtis harbour to lay out a township and to initiate a survey of the hinterland in preparation for its development as a pastoral district. When McCabe's labours had resulted in the partial survey of the town, a Government Residency was established at Gladstone in 1854 to oversee civil development in the Port Curtis Pastoral District.

Closer settlement in the Boyne Valley and the surrounding district occurred in a number of waves. The first wave was the periodic resumption of the original leasehold runs into smaller leases, which were then let as grazing properties. This was the common pattern from the 1870s through to the end of the First World War. In later years, more intensive settlement occurred with the reduction of the grazing blocks into agricultural and dairy selections. The Port Curtis Dairy Company Ltd (the PCD) was formed at Gladstone in 1904, with its first timber factory buildings erected at Gladstone in 1906. Later developments included the construction of the Gladstone-to-Monto railway line from Byellee to Many Peaks through Ubobo, which opened on 25 July 1910.

Along the Boyne River, the major development in the pattern of land use occurred with the creation of the so-called "soldier settlements" to assist veterans of the First World War. In 1920, the 21-year leases on the pastoral properties of Ubobo, Hybla, Melrose, Degalgil and Cluden expired. When the 1914–1918 war ended the Government sought to compensate those members of the services who were being discharged from the Army, Navy or Air Force, by making available land under the soldier Settlement Schemes. One such scheme was the Ubobo Soldier Settlement Scheme.

These areas were resumed by government legislation, leaving a homestead block as an option to the original selectors. The selections were available by perpetual lease, with Agricultural Bank assistance up to approximately $1400 available to develop the property and purchase stock. The Settlement Supervisor was WA Collins. He was later succeeded by ET Wannop. The money provided by the Agricultural Bank as advances on development work, was paid following the inspection of the work, and the endorsement of the payment by the Supervisor. All of the farms were to be used as dairy farms and associated farming. William P (Bill) Spencer, a carpenter at Nagoorin, had a contract to build all the soldier settler houses.

The selectors were from every walk of life. There were shop assistants, bank tellers, a plantation manager, drovers, Englishmen, a Scottish champion ploughman and local residents of the Port Curtis District. One of the first properties in the Ubobo area, Portion 115, was taken up by Robert Sydney Davies in 1920. The portion number contained 95 acres. Davies was born in England in 1883, and aged sixteen years, he stowed away in a troopship for South Africa. Once there, Davies joined an Essex Regiment with which he fought during the three years of the Boer War (1899–1901). He remained in the British Army for eight years, serving in India and Burma.

In the years preceding the First World War, Davies was a rubber plantation manager for Burns Philp in Choisuel, in the British Solomon Islands. He also oversaw the Japanese pearl divers working for Burns Philp. Davies enlisted in the war on 5 October 1914, joining the Queensland 9th Battalion.

The 9th Battalion, which served in the First World War with honour, was the first to leave Queensland and among the first Australian troops to land at Gallipoli on the morning of 25 April 1915. Davies, as a member of a boat carrying twelve men, went ashore ahead of the main force. Some months later, Davies was wounded, losing one of his eyes. He returned to Australia on 5 July 1915.

The Ubobo soldier settlement brought back, for a short while, encouragement for the future, which had fallen away with the ending of the mining era, and the closure of the Many Peaks mine. The dairy industry developed, agriculture was encouraged, and much farm land was opened up on which were grown good cotton crops finding employment for cotton pickers. During the 1910s dairying expanded in the surrounding districts, particularly at Mount Larcom and Bracewell, and the Port Curtis Dairy Company (PCD) made steady progress. Following the appointment in January 1916 of Joseph W Rigby as Manager and Secretary, the area from which the company received cream was extended and the company's growth was greatly accelerated. In the period 1916 to 1923, suppliers increased from 216 to 502 and manufactured butter from 179 to 539 tons.

By the 1920s, the PCD was one of the largest co-operative dairy companies in Queensland. The activities of the PDC at Gladstone and in surrounding districts stimulated the expansion of commercial dairying in Central Queensland. Statewide, dairying was an important economic activity for the first half of the 20th century.

The township of Ubobo first appears in the Queensland Post Office Directory [Country] in 1926. The majority of those listed in the area are farmers (39 out of 54), including RS Davies. The other listings are for labourers, graziers and stockmen as well as a storekeeper/postmaster and a teacher. There are numerous changes in ownership/tenure over the years in the first ten years of the town appearing in the Directories, seventeen farmers left the area and eleven new names appeared. Later with the years of the depression, falling prices and not being able to meet liability that looked so attractive in the beginning, many others left.

While initially providing future prospects, for the most part the soldier settlement schemes were generally disastrous because the resumed land was cut into small, uneconomic blocks, Added to this was the inexperience of most soldier settlers, or an inadequate capital base, and the result was social and economic disaster. At Ubobo, the resumed leases were cut up into fifty-four farms: twenty-seven in the parish of Wietalba and twenty-seven in the parish of Ubobo. Virtually every block was taken up. These fifty-four households (most including children) were expected to make a living as dairy farmers where five families had formerly grazed cattle and in good years make a modest profit and in bad years a loss. Many properties were surrendered by the original selectors, most of whom left the district with a degree of bitterness.

Following World War II, with the economic depression of the butter section of the dairy industry, the properties were gradually bought by others to amalgamate with their holdings, thus providing a larger and more viable area. Excepting the actual river frontage with the good agricultural land thereabout the settlement has again reverted to its former purpose, the grazing of cattle.

RS Davies' property is now occupied by Hector (son of RS Davies and Gloria Davies), who established a modern piggery as well as lucerne growing on the site. The property taken up by RS Davies is the only block still occupied by descendants of the original soldier settler. The Davies family purchased Portion 114 (now Lot 114), in the 1960s. This block, originally taken up by RJ Metten, has a soldier settlers house constructed on the property. It is in a more deteriorated state than the house constructed by RS Davies.

When constructed, the soldier settlers house comprised three rooms, a bedroom, a dining room and a kitchen. A verandah opened on the eastern end of the southern side of the building and another verandah on the northern side. At a later date, the verandahs on both sides of the house were enclosed to provide more space. The house is currently unoccupied.

== Description ==
The soldier settler house is a single storey, timber building set on high timber stumps clad with weatherboards. The gable roof building is clad with corrugated galvanised iron. Timber framed, casement windows, with metal window hoods, are located along all elevations of the building. These windows have replaced the original sash windows. Some of the window hoods have star patterns, a common design and occurrence in the buildings constructed in the Boyne Valley.

The original staircases located in the northern and southern elevations have been removed. The stove recess in the north-west corner of the building is still extant.

Internally, the building comprises three rooms [a bedroom, dining room and a kitchen]. Later, the eastern side of the northern verandah was enclosed and the southern verandah was enclosed to provide for more rooms in the house. A modern water tank is located in the north-western corner near the building. The south-west corner of the undercroft has been enclosed with weatherboards.

The verandah on the southern side of the house appears to have been enclosed. Further, it would seem that additions have been constructed on the westerns side in the form of an extension to provide for another room, as well as the enclosing of the verandah on the northern side as well as the addition of a porch and staircase. The house is not in as good condition as the house on Lot 114 and was not inspected internally.

A single storey timber building is located to the rear of the house. The building has sash windows, with metal window hoods with a star pattern. The hipped roof is clad with corrugated galvanised iron.

The former soldier settlers house is located on a working farm. The house is surrounded by mature vegetation, with views south to the Boyne River.

== Heritage listing ==
Soldier Settler House was listed on the Queensland Heritage Register on 28 September 2001 having satisfied the following criteria.

The place is important in demonstrating the evolution or pattern of Queensland's history.

The soldier settlers house is significant for its association with the major redevelopment of the Boyne Valley area, and the establishment of the soldier settlements in the Ubobo area in particular, following the First World War, which led to closer settlement of the area generally.

The soldier settlers house is significant as a surviving building remaining on the property on which it was taken up. Significantly, it was taken up by one of the earliest soldier settlers in the area, RS Davies, and is the only remaining property which is still being worked by the descendants of the original soldier settler.

The place demonstrates rare, uncommon or endangered aspects of Queensland's cultural heritage.

As a substantially intact, extant structure, located on its original block and associated with the development of the soldier settlement schemes, the soldier settlers house is significant for its rarity.

The place is important in demonstrating the principal characteristics of a particular class of cultural places.

Designed to a standard government plan, the soldier settlers house is significant as an example of a typical type of construction. Like the majority of soldier settlers' homes, the small, high-set, timber cottage originally comprised a core of four rooms with verandahs opening to both the front and the rear of the building.

The place has a strong or special association with a particular community or cultural group for social, cultural or spiritual reasons.

The soldier settlers house is significant for its association with those who took up property under the soldier settlement schemes and their descendants, and with their experiences, in the majority of cases, ultimately unsuccessful, with the scheme.
