= Molangul, Queensland =

Molangul
- Suburb
- Interactive map of Molangul
- Coordinates: 24.7672°S 151.5386°E
- Country: Australia
- State: Queensland
- LGA: Bundaberg Region
- Location: 59.6 km (37.0 mi) SSE of Builyan; 57.6 km (35.8 mi) N of Mount Perry; 70.7 km (43.9 mi) ENE of Monto; 104 km (65 mi) WNW of Bundaberg; 426 km (265 mi) NNW of Brisbane

Government
  - State electorate: Callide
  - Federal division: Flynn

Area
  - Total: 185.9 km^{2} (71.8 sq mi)

Population
  - Total: 0 (2021 census)
  - Density: 0.0000/km^{2} (0.000/sq mi)
- Time zone: UTC+10:00 (AEST)
- Postcode: 4671
Suburbs around Molangul
Dalga	Gindoran	Lowmead; Kolonga
Kalpowar	Molangul	Gaeta
Yarrol	Yarrol	Gaeta

Molangul is a rural locality in the Bundaberg Region, Queensland, Australia. In the 2021 census, Molangul had "no people or a very low population".

== Geography ==
The Kalpowar Road enters the locality from the east (Gaeta) and exits to the west (Kalpowar).

The Bulburin National Park and Bulburin State Forest are in the north-east of the locality. Apart from these protected areas, the land use is grazing on native vegetation.

== History ==
In 1887, 72,080 acres (29,170 ha) of land were resumed from the Molungal pastoral run. The land was offered for selection for the establishment of small farms on 17 April 1887.

== Demographics ==
In the 2016 census, Molangul had a population of 13 people.

In the 2021 census, Molangul had "no people or a very low population".

== Education ==
There are no schools in Molangul. The nearest government primary schools are Builyan State School in Builyan to the north and Mount Perry State School in Mount Perry to the south. The nearest government secondary school is Monto State High School in Monto to the south-west; however this school would be too distant for some students in Molangul to attend with the alternatives being distance education and boarding school.
