= Monal, Queensland =

Monal
- Suburb
- Interactive map of Monal
- Coordinates: 24.6330°S 151.1483°E
- Country: Australia
- State: Queensland
- LGA: North Burnett Region
- Location: 39.8 km (24.7 mi) S of Monto; 110 km (68 mi) S of Gladstone; 168 km (104 mi) NS of Bundaberg; 192 km (119 mi) N of Gayndah; 527 km (327 mi) NNW of Brisbane

Government
  - State electorate: Callide
  - Federal division: Flynn

Area
  - Total: 330.3 km^{2} (127.5 sq mi)

Population
  - Total: 34 (2021 census)
  - Density: 0.1029/km^{2} (0.267/sq mi)
- Time zone: UTC+10:00 (AEST)
- Postcode: 4630
Suburbs around Monal
Cania	Boyne Valley	Boyne Valley
Cania	Monal	Kalpowar
Moonford	Mungungo	Bancroft

Monal is a rural locality in the North Burnett Region, Queensland, Australia. In the 2021 census, Monal had a population of 34 people.

== Geography ==
Monal Creek rises in the north of the locality and flows southward, exiting the locality to the south (Mungungo).

The terrain is mountainous with two named peaks:

- Mount Graabi in the north-west of the locality (24.5°S 151.1166°E) 758 metres (2,487 ft)
- Pine Mountain (24.6419°S 151.1944°E) 758 metres (2,487 ft)

The Degalgil State Forest is in the north-east of the locality, while some sections of Dawes National Park and Pine Mountain State Forest are in the east of the locality. Apart from these protected areas, the predominant land use is grazing on native vegetation.

== History ==
The locality takes its name from the parish name, which in turn takes its name from the pastoral run held by James C. Mackay in 1853. The run can be seen on maps of the district in 1872 and 1878.

In 1891, gold was found in Monal and the Monal Goldfield was established. In 1900, a township was established along Monal Creek near the junctions with Crooked Creek and Raspberry Creek in the northernmost part of the current locality (24.4986°S 151.1358°E) and had a population of up to 500 people. However, the goldfield did not yield a lot of gold and was described in 1901 as "a reefing field which, with some outlying alluvial patches, supports with varying fortune a small population". By 1907, there were only two mines being worked. In 1908, the government extended the area of the goldfield, but the gold had petered out and the focus of the district returned to farming.

Monal Provisional School opened on 15 June 1892. On 1 January 1909, it became Monal State School. It closed in 1909, but reopened in 1912 but then closed again. In 1915, it reopened as a half time school with Dooboon State School (meaning the two schools shared a single teacher) but closed c. 1916. It was at approx 24.4975°S 151.1349°E.

== Demographics ==
In the 2016 census, Monal had a population of 35 people.

In the 2021 census, Monal had a population of 34 people.

== Heritage listings ==
Monal has a number of heritage-listed sites, including:

- Monal Town Site, Mine and Cemetery, on Monal Road

== Education ==
There are no schools in Monal. The nearest government primary schools are Monto State School in Monto the south, Ubobo State School and Builyan State School, both of which are in Boyne Valley to the north-east. The nearest government secondary school is Monto State High School in Monto.
