= Dalga, Queensland =

Dalga
- Suburb
- Interactive map of Dalga
- Coordinates: 24.6138°S 151.4761°E
- Country: Australia
- State: Queensland
- LGA: Bundaberg Region
- Location: 90 km (56 mi) SSW of Miriam Vale; 138 km (86 mi) WNW of Bundaberg; 446 km (277 mi) NNW of Brisbane

Government
  - State electorate: Callide
  - Federal division: Flynn

Area
  - Total: 144.1 km^{2} (55.6 sq mi)

Population
  - Total: 0 (2021 census)
  - Density: 0.000/km^{2} (0.000/sq mi)
- Time zone: UTC+10:00 (AEST)
- Postcode: 4630
Suburbs around Dalga
Boyne Valley	Gindoran	Gindoran
Kalpowar	Dalga	Gindoran
Kalpowar	Kalpowar	Molangul

Dalga is a rural locality in the Bundaberg Region, Queensland, Australia. In the 2021 census, Dalga had "no people or a very low population".

== Geography ==
The Kolan River rises in the north of locality and flows to the south (Kalpowar). The Dawes Range is in the north-east of the locality and this area is within the Bulburin National Park. Most of the land is mountainous and undeveloped, except for the lower areas in the valley of the Kolan River. Apart from the national park, the predominant land use is grazing on native vegetation.

== Demographics ==
In the 2016 census, Dalga had "no people or a very low population".

In the 2021 census, Dalga had "no people or a very low population".

== Education ==
There are no schools in Dalga. The nearest government primary schools are Builyan State School in Builyan within neighbouring Boyne Valley to the north-west and Lowmead State School in Lowmead to the east. The nearest government secondary schools Miriam Vale State School (to Year 10) in Miriam Vale to the north, but it would be distant from some parts of Dalba. Also, there are no schools providing education to Year 12 nearby. The alternatives are distance education and boarding school.
