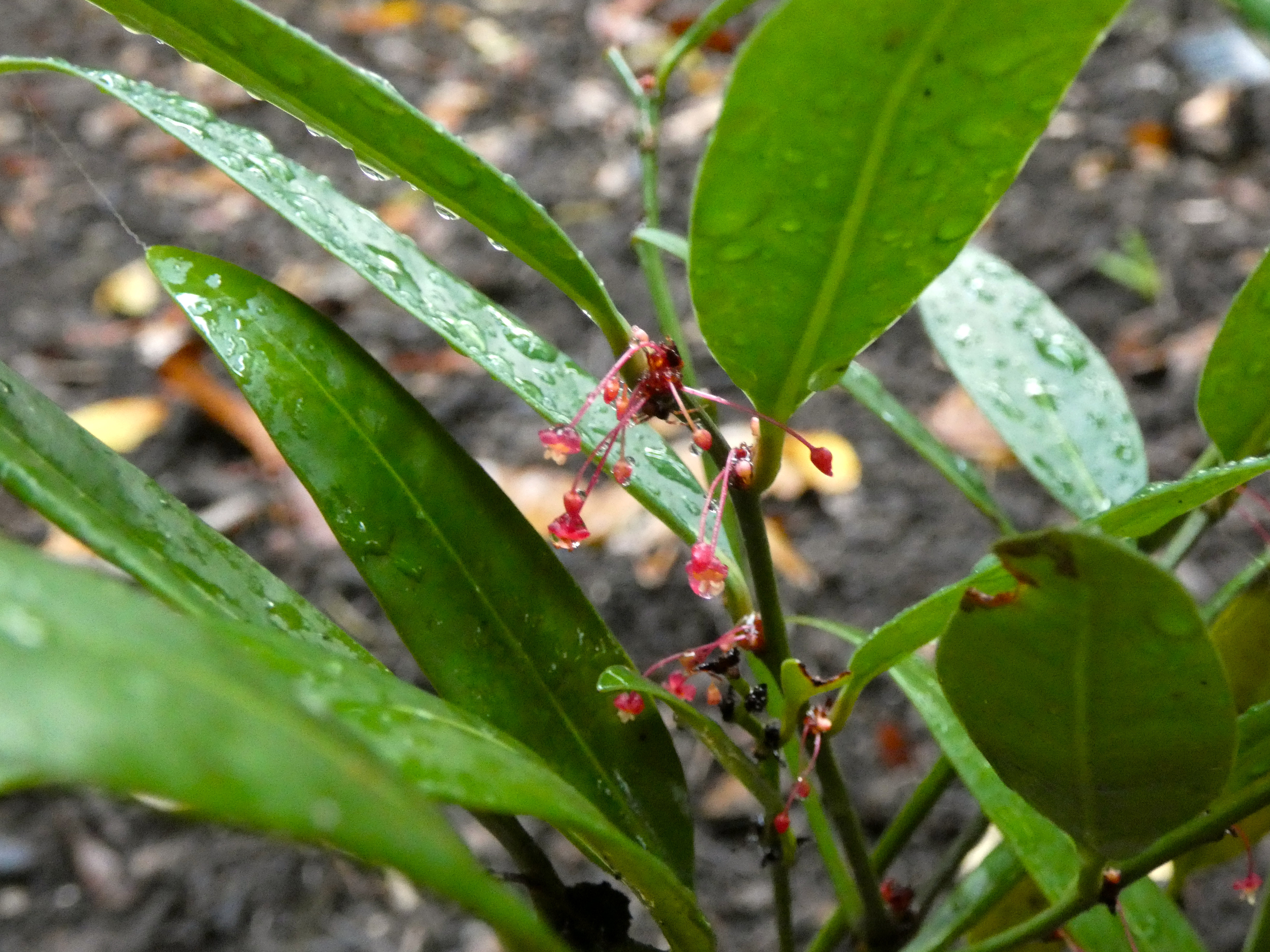
- Flowering at Cairns Botanic Gardens

Conservation status
- Vulnerable (NCA)

Scientific classification
- Kingdom: Plantae
- Clade: Tracheophytes
- Clade: Angiosperms
- Clade: Eudicots
- Clade: Rosids
- Order: Malpighiales
- Family: Phyllanthaceae
- Genus: Phyllanthus
- Species: P. brassii

Binomial name
- Phyllanthus brassii C.T.White
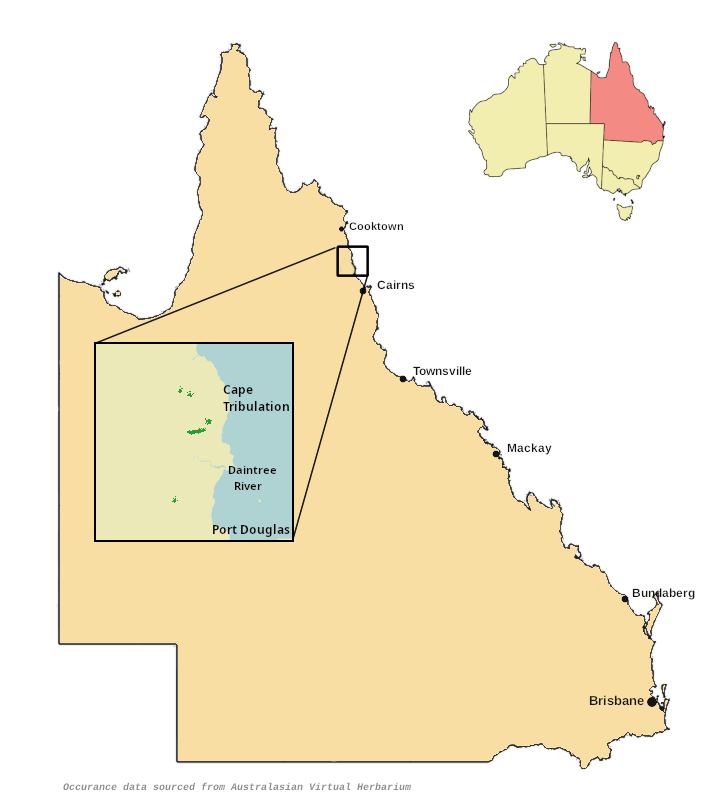

Synonyms
- Dendrophyllanthus brassii (C.T.White) R.W.Bouman nom. inval.

= Phyllanthus brassii =

Phyllanthus

Species of flowering plant

Phyllanthus brassii, commonly known as phyllanthus, is a species of plant in the family Phyllanthaceae native to Queensland, Australia. It is a rainforest shrub, first described in 1935, which occurs in two widely separated populations. It has a conservation status of vulnerable.

== Description ==
Phyllanthus brassii is a shrub up to 2 m (6 ft 7 in) high with simple, alternately arranged leaves held on very short petioles (leaf stalks) up to 6 mm (0.24 in) long. The leaves are elliptic to lanceolate and measure up to 12 cm (4.7 in) long and 4.5 cm (1.8 in) wide. The secondary veins form distinct loops inside the leaf margin and the tertiary venation is reticulate. The leaves are glossy green, hairless and fleshy, the petioles are thickened and dark.

Flowers grow in fascicles, or clusters, from the leaf axils on very long, slender pedicels (flower stalks) about 25 mm (1 in) long. They are very small - the four sepals are only about 2 mm (0.08 in) long and just over 1 mm (0.04 in) wide. The fruit is a green or brown capsule about 5 mm (0.20 in) diameter, with three segments. Each segment contains a seed about 2 mm (0.08 in) long.

This species is dioecious, meaning that pistillate (functionally female) and staminate (functionally male) flowers are borne on separate plants.

== Taxonomy ==
It was first described in 1935 by Australian botanist Cyril Tenison White, based on material collected near the summit of Thornton Peak by plant collector Leonard John Brass (who White acknowledged in the specific epithet). White published the name in the journal Proceedings of the Royal Society of Queensland.

In 2022, Roderick Bouman et al. published a paper in the journal Phytotaxa, transferring this species to the genus Dendrophyllanthus. Their new name is not accepted by the Australian National Herbarium, nor by Plants of the World Online, and is considered to be invalidly published.

== Distribution and habitat ==
This plant occurs only in Queensland, Australia in a very small part of Daintree National Park. It grows in rainforest, particularly along watercourses. The altitudinal range is 300–1,300 m (980–4,270 ft). The area of occupancy (Note: For a definition of Area of Occupancy see this page at the Atlas of Living Australia) of P. brassii is estimated to be about 32 km^{2} (12 sq mi)

A population of plants at Bulburin National Park in southern Queensland was previously thought to be a disjunct occurrence of this species; it has now been separated as a potential new species and was given the phrase name Phyllanthus sp. (Bulburin P.I. Forster + PIF 16034).

== Conservation ==
This species is listed as vulnerable under the Queensland Government's Nature Conservation Act. As of 10 August 2025, it has not been assessed under the Australian Government's EPBC Act nor by the International Union for Conservation of Nature (IUCN).

== Gallery ==
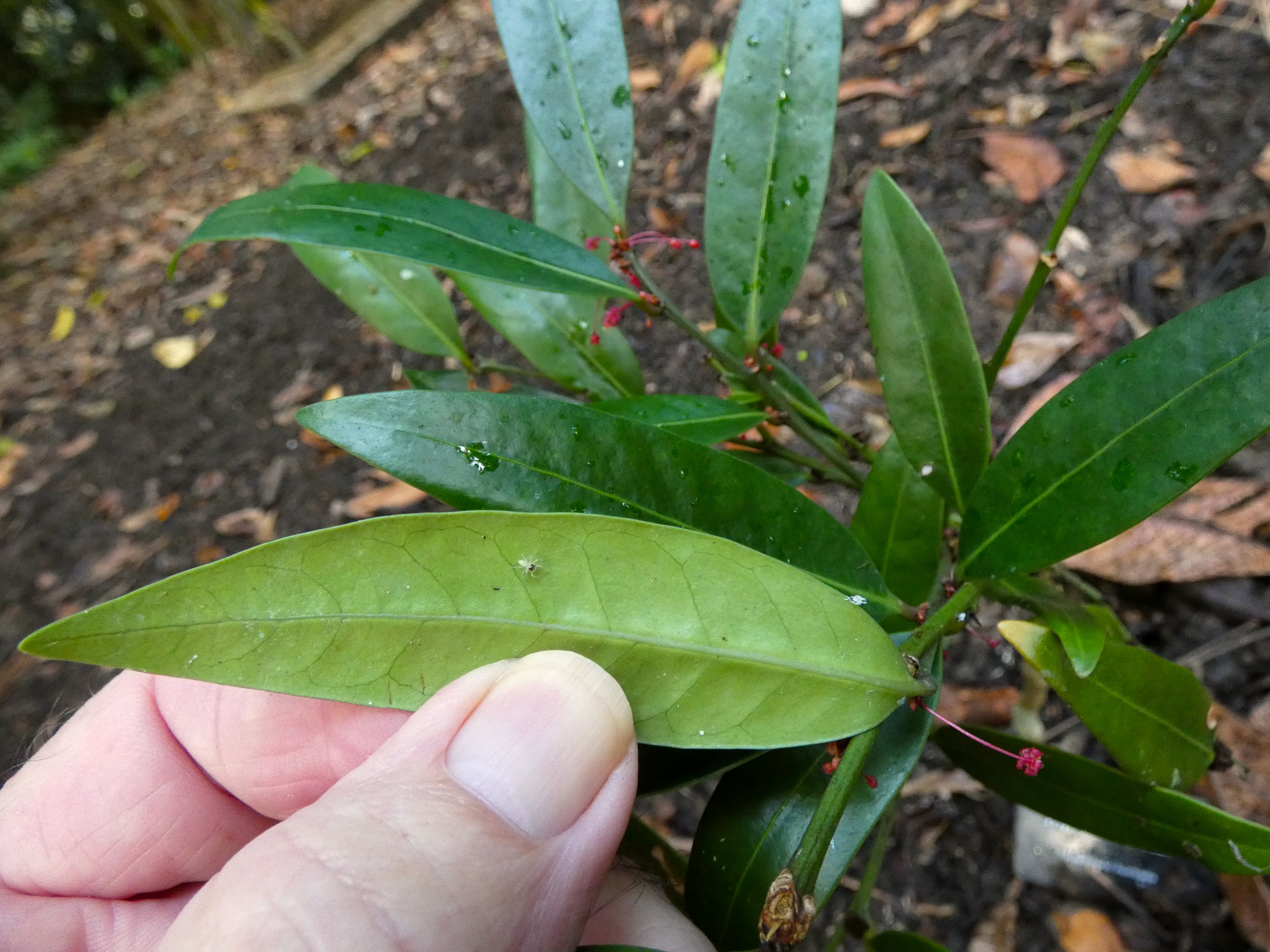
Leaves

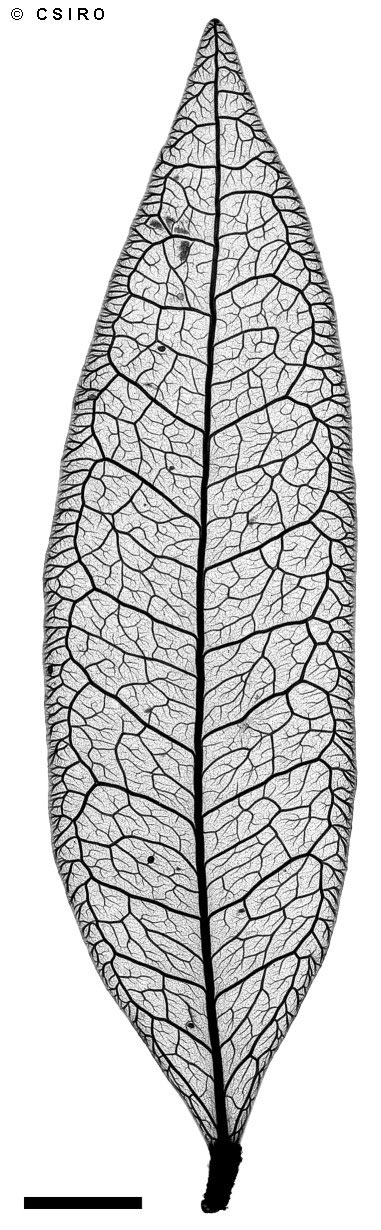
X-ray of leaf showing fine venation

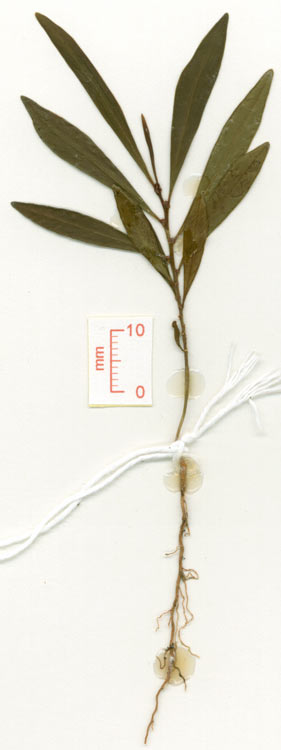
Seedling

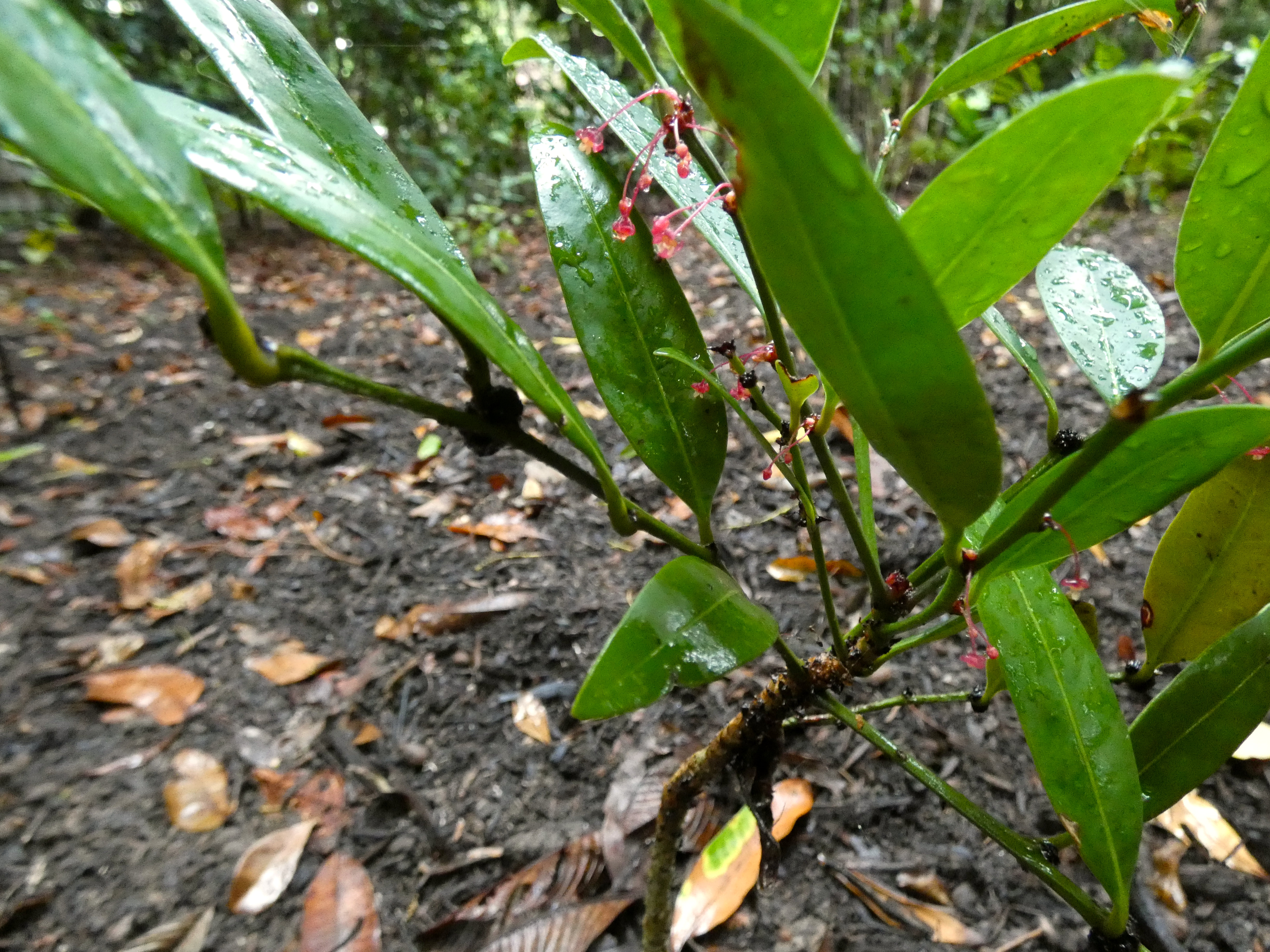
Foliage and flowers

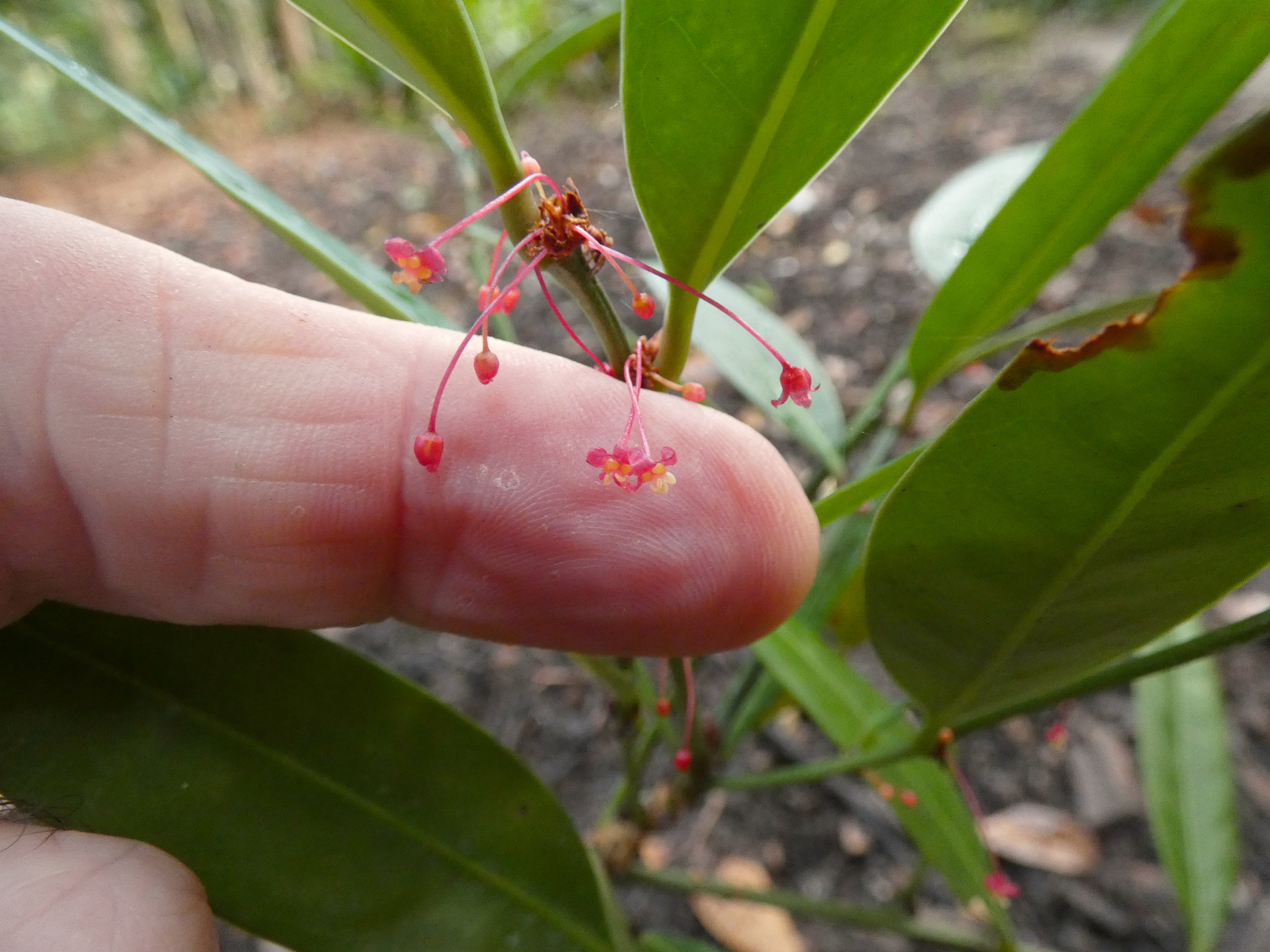
Flowers
