= Gindoran, Queensland =

Gindoran
- Suburb
- Interactive map of Gindoran
- Coordinates: 24.6083°S 151.5972°E
- Country: Australia
- State: Queensland
- LGA: Gladstone Region
- Location: 40.1 km (24.9 mi) S of Miriam Vale; 61.0 km (37.9 mi) W of Rosedale; 108 km (67 mi) SSE of Gladstone CBD; 117 km (73 mi) NW of Bundaberg; 439 km (273 mi) NNW of Brisbane

Government
  - State electorate: Burnett
  - Federal division: Flynn

Area
  - Total: 314.4 km^{2} (121.4 sq mi)

Population
  - Total: 0 (2021 census)
  - Density: 0.0000/km^{2} (0.000/sq mi)
- Time zone: UTC+10:00 (AEST)
- Postcode: 4676
Suburbs around Gindoran
Boyne Valley	Colosseum	Colosseum
Dalga	Gindoran	Lowmead
Dalga	Molangul	Lowmead

Gindoran is a rural locality in the Gladstone Region, Queensland, Australia. In the 2021 census, Gindoran had "no people or a very low population".

== Geography ==
The Bruce Highway enters from the south-west (Lowmead) and proceeds north, exiting to the north-west (Colosseum).

Gindoran has the following mountains (from north to south):

- Granite Hill (24.5419°S 151.6414°E) 163 metres (535 ft)
- Booroon Booroon Mountain (24.5819°S 151.5687°E) 623 metres (2,044 ft)
- Gindoran Peak (24.5881°S 151.5847°E) 445 metres (1,460 ft)
- Mount Molangul (24.6676°S 151.5271°E) 778 metres (2,552 ft)

The Bulburin National Park and Bulburin State Forest extend from the north-west through to the south of the locality. Apart from these protected areas, the land use is a mixture of grazing and plantation forestry.

== Demographics ==
In the 2016 census, Gindoran had "no people or a very low population".

In the 2021 census, Gindoran had "no people or a very low population".

== Education ==
There are no schools in Gindoran. The nearest government primary schools are Lowmead State School in neighbouring Lowmead to the east and Miriam Vale State School in Miriam Vale to the north. The nearest government secondary schools are Miriam Vale State School (to Year 10) to the north and Rosedale State School (to Year 12) in Rosedale to the east. However, students in the north-western parts of the locality may be too distant to attend these secondary schools; the alternatives are distance education and boarding school.
