= Colosseum, Queensland =

Colosseum
- Suburb
- Interactive map of Colosseum
- Coordinates: 24.4416°S 151.5958°E
- Country: Australia
- State: Queensland
- LGA: Gladstone Region
- Location: 5.6 km (3.5 mi) SSW of Miriam Vale; 56.9 km (35.4 mi) S of Tannum Sands; 66.1 km (41.1 mi) NW of Rosedale; 74.5 km (46.3 mi) SSE of Gladstone; 456 km (283 mi) NNW of Brisbane

Government
  - State electorate: Burnett
  - Federal division: Flynn

Area
  - Total: 405.6 km^{2} (156.6 sq mi)

Population
  - Total: 184 (2021 census)
  - Density: 0.4536/km^{2} (1.175/sq mi)
- Time zone: UTC+10:00 (AEST)
- Postcode: 4677
Suburbs around Colosseum
Bororen	Miriam Vale	Mount Tom
Boyne Valley	Colosseum	Taunton
Gindoran	Gindoran	Lowmead

Colosseum is a rural locality in the Gladstone Region, Queensland, Australia. In the 2021 census, Colosseum had a population of 184 people.

== Geography ==
The locality is bounded to the west by the ridge of the Many Peaks Range and to the south-east loosely by Baffle Creek at the foot of the Gwynne Range (in the neighbouring locality of Mount Tom to the west).

The Bruce Highway passes through the locality from south (Gindoran) to north (Miriam Vale). The North Coast railway line passes through the locality from south-east (Lowmead) to north-east (Miriam Vale / Mount Tom).

The north-west corner of the locality is within Bulburin National Park which extends into neighbouring locality of Boyne Valley. A second disconnected part of Bulburin National Park incorporates part of the western edge of Colosseum, extending into Boyne Valley and neighbouring Gindoran to the south-west. The Mount Colosseum National Park is in the east of the locality.

Apart from the protected areas, the land use is a mixture of plantation forestry (mostly in the south-west of the locality) and grazing on native vegetation. The residential area is mostly around the Bruce Highway in the north of the locality.

There are a number of mountains in the locality including (from north to south):

- Mount Colosseum (24.4102°S 151.5791°E) at 488 metres (1,601 ft) above sea level in the Mount Colosseum National Park
- Mount Elmo (24.4508°S 151.6166°E) at 220 metres (720 ft) above sea level in the centre of the locality
- Dahls Hill (24.4844°S 151.5852°E) at 197 metres (646 ft) above sea level in the south of the locality
- Palm Hill (24.5202°S 151.6294°E) at 164 metres (538 ft) above sea level in the south of the locality
- Granite Hill (24.5333°S 151.65°E) at 163 metres (535 ft) above sea level on the southern boundary of the locality with Gindoran

== History ==
The section of the North Coast railway line from Rosedale to Iveragh opened on 1 October 1897 with the locality being served by the now-abandoned Colosseum railway station (24.3905°S 151.6106°E).

Polmaily Provisional School opened on 22 August 1900. On 1 January 1909, it became Polmaily State School. It closed in 1935. The school was at 664 Blackmans Gap Road (24.3885°S 151.5221°E).

Mount Pleasant Provisional School opened in 1904, being renamed in the same year Figton Provisional School. On 1 January 1909, it became Figton State School. It closed in 1917. It was on a 10-acre (4.0 ha) site at approx 24.44889°S 151.58488°E in the middle of farmland; today this is just north of the Bruce Highway, but the highway did not exist at that time.

The Polmaily State School War Memorial is at the back of the former Polmaily State School site in bushland (24.38148°S 151.52165°E). It commemorates 18 pupils of the school who served in World War I. It was unveiled on Friday 13 December 1918 by Elizabeth Smith, wife of the Presbyterian minister Thomas Smith, who also spoke at the ceremony. The couple had two sons who served in the war, Sydney Francis and Archibald Philip. The memorial was organised by Charles Row Vanderwolf whose two sons Charles Jakeman and Harry served with Charles Jakeman killed. The memorial is an obelisk 11 feet 6 inches (3.51 m) high and was made from Queensland freestone with marble panels by stonemason John Thomas Satchwill of Knight Marble Works in Maryborough. Although the school land is now used for other purposes, a 809-square-metre (0.200-acre) land parcel has been set aside as a reserve for the war memorial with the Gladstone Regional Council appointed trustee.

Bariveloe State School opened on 2 August 1927 and closed on 15 June 1947. The school was located on Bariveloe Road just south of Colosseum Creek (approx 24.4244°S 151.5246°E).

== Demographics ==
In the 2016 census, Colosseum had a population of 218 people.

In the 2021 census, Colosseum had a population of 184 people.

== Education ==
There are no schools in Colosseum. The nearest government primary schools are Miriam Vale State School in neighbouring Miriam Vale to the north and Lowmead State School in neighbouring Lowmead to the southeast. The nearest government secondary schools are Miriam Vale State School (to Year 10), Rosedale State School (to Year 12) in Rosedale to the south, and Tannum Sands State High School in Tannum Sands to the north-east.
