= Norton Goldfield =

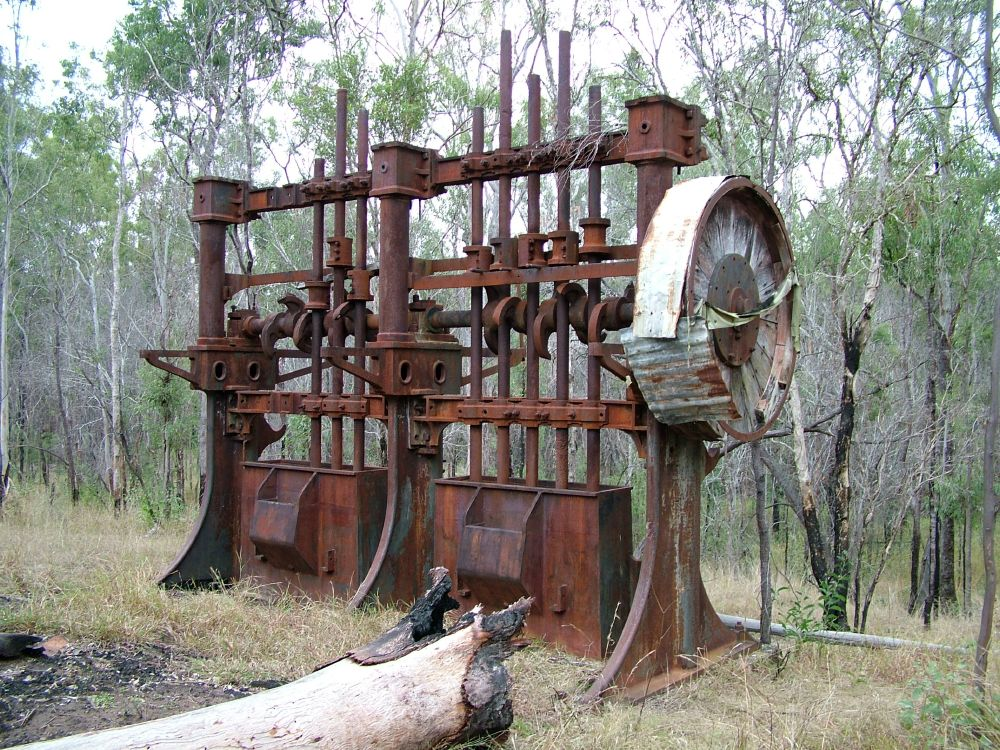
- Stamper battery on the Norton Goldfield

- Location within Queensland Location within Australia
- 24.3196°S 151.373°E
- Location: Norton Road, near Nagoorin, Boyne Valley, Gladstone Region, Queensland, Australia

History
- Design period: 1870s - 1890s (late 19th century)
- Built: 1870s - 1941

Queensland Heritage Register
- Official name: Norton Goldfield, Milton Goldfield
- Type: state heritage (archaeological, built)
- Designated: 27 October 2006
- Reference no.: 602491
- Significant period: 1870s-1940s (fabric, historical)
- Significant components: water race, battery/crusher/stamper/jaw breaker, chimney/chimney stack, adit, furnace, footings, shaft, embankment - tramway, flue, tank - water

Norton Goldfield is a heritage-listed former mine at Norton Road, near Nagoorin, Boyne Valley, Gladstone Region, Queensland, Australia. It was built from 1870s to 1941. It is also known as Milton Goldfield. It was added to the Queensland Heritage Register on 27 October 2006.

== History ==
The Norton Goldfield was originally part of the Milton pastoral run that had been taken up by William Henry Walsh, who had named the property for his childhood English home. Walsh was elected a Member of the New South Wales Legislative Assembly in 1859. His opposition to the separation of Queensland from New South Wales ensured that he did not become a member of the first Queensland Parliament.

George Williams and Charles Lett discovered gold on the Milton (Norton) Goldfield in 1871. Proclaimed on 12 May 1879 the field comprised 107.6 square kilometres and extended west from the Many Peaks Range to the Boyne River. The field is located approximately 35 kilometres (22 mi) south of Calliope and is said to have been named after Albert Norton, a member of the first Calliope Divisional Board. No information appears to be available on the goldfield until 1878–1879 when it was reported that there were 60 miners and two three-head stamper batteries in operation on the field. Carmichael who was to be active on the field for many years had set up these batteries.

Most of the gold extracted from the Norton field came from reefs although some alluvial gold was won from a gully running through the township of Norton and from Naylor's Gully. Norton goldfield reefs were located to the north and south of the Norton Creek; to the north the principal reefs were the Advance, Who'd-Have-Thought-It, Hickey Claim, Carmichael's Gully, Marodian, Rands and Emu, while to the south the reefs included Frampton's (also known as Martin's), All Nations, Never Never, Little Wonder, Chandlers, Bald Hill, Brigham Young, Hans Big Dyke, New Constitution, Old Welcome and Galena Reefs. Silver was also mined at Norton.

The ores at Norton were complex; they contained gold, silver, lead, copper and zinc in varying concentrations, and various methods were explored and tried to maximise gold retrieval, or to retrieve the other minerals.

In 1884 the Frampton United Company was formed in an attempt to establish a chlorination plant but the following year Wattle Creek on which the crushing operations depended dried up and crushing operations were halted. In 1886 five reverberatory furnaces were set up at the Frampton United Company lease, to be operated in conjunction with a chlorination plant for gold retrieval. Frampton United Company then erected a barrel chlorination plant and with the 5 reverberatory furnaces achieved a throughput capacity of 60 long tons (61 t) per week at a cost of £3,000.

Because the miners did not like the smelting work, Kanaka labour was employed to operate the furnaces. It appears likely the furnaces were used to roast the ores, rather than actually smelt them, as the ore would have had to be friable to be chlorinated successfully. The ore was first crushed in a "dry crusher" and a 10-head battery, before roasting. This chlorination works was closed down in 1891, possibly because the nature of the ore changed and the components absorbed too much chlorine. No further reference is made to roasting ore.

In 1888 a 10-head stamper and a "dry crusher" were installed but these proved a failure. In 1889 the Advance Company went down 400 feet (120 m) and erected roasting and chlorination plant but following an unsuccessful attempt to treat 70 long tons (71 t) of ore this plant was abandoned in 1890. The continued failure was probably due to a high amount of calcite in the ore.

The Conran Gold Mining Company took over from Frampton United Company in 1891 and the chlorination works were suddenly shut down possibly because of a change in the composition of the ore. By 1893 only minimal work was being undertaken including surface collection.

In 1895 Carmichael again tried chlorination but failed once again. Still further attempts were made to make the field payable and in 1899 Carmichael erected a water-jacket blast furnace but the results were not satisfactory probably because a qualified metallurgist was not employed to manage the blast furnace.

Although an application was made for a further 2 leases no work carried out until 1902 following the opening of the road to Bororen that provided direct access to the North Coast Railway. In 1903 Marodian Gold Mining Company acquired a lease of 40 acres (16 ha) but by 1904 had ceased operation. In 1906 Carmichael erected a water-jacket blast furnace to drive off lead and zinc which would leave a copper matte containing the gold and silver. Between 1906 and 1918 several small groups worked the mines with the ore being sent to Port Kembla for treatment. It was during this period that German army engineer Johan Gundolf erected a water- driven crushing mill (known as an arrastra) and a 375-metre (1,230 ft) water-race along the banks of Norton Creek.

In 1918 Frampton Mine, one of the more consistent operations at Norton employed four men to work the mine and although a 10-head stamper battery had been acquired this was not set up until 1923. In 1924 tramlines were laid down connecting the mine and the battery. In 1927 it was reported that a good crushing plant was available but the owners were unable to proceed with crushing. In 1928 a crushing of 4 long tons (4.1 t) of ore was sent to Port Kembla for treatment. The return from this was 14 ounces (400 g) of gold and 20 ounces (570 g) of silver.

The last Norton Goldfield returns appear to have been in 1941, when the Frampton mine was re-opened by TH Smith and the ore sent to Chillagoe for treatment.

While official reports of the returns are patchy available figures show that 8,776 ounces (248,800 g) of gold were mined on the Norton Goldfield during the period 1879–1941.

== Description ==
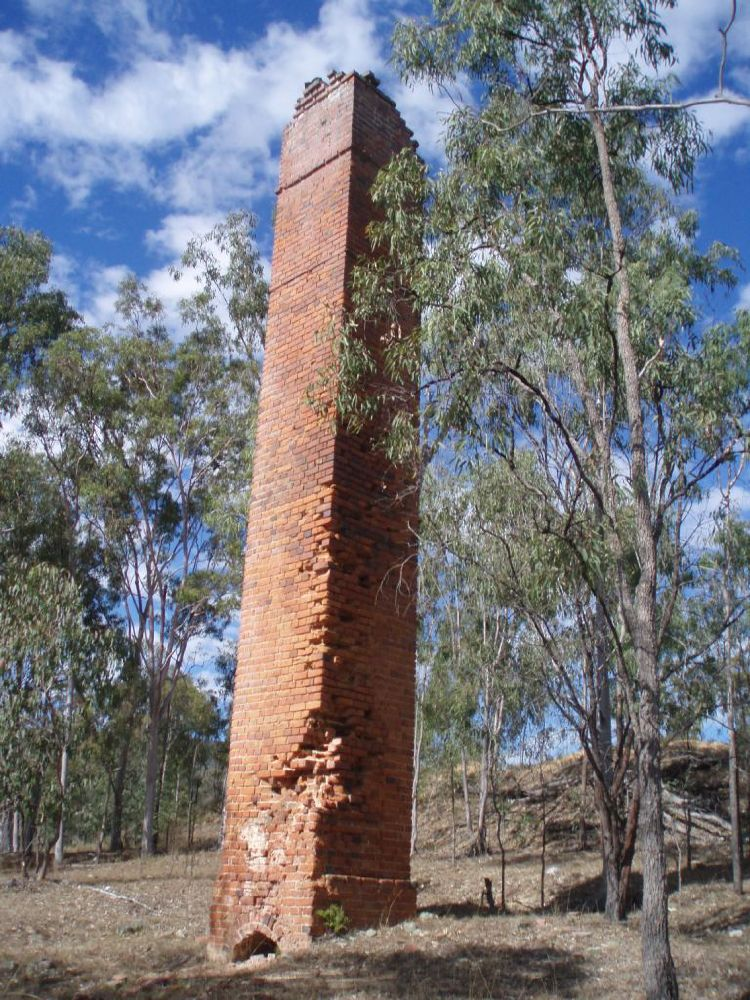
Surviving chimney on the Norton Goldfield, 2009

The Norton Goldfield is accessed via Norton Road which exits the village of Nargoorin to the east. Travel along this roadway in a northeast direction for approximately 12 kilometres (7.5 mi).

The gold roasting furnace site consists of four parallel 22 by 2.75 metres (72.2 by 9.0 ft) brick plinths with collapsed brick arched roofs, interpreted as being roasting furnace bases. The plinths are separated by approximately 5.25 metres (17.2 ft) spaces between them, one of which at least is paved (the others are largely covered with soils and rubble). The furnaces fed in pairs into two chimneys via brick and stone flues, interconnected with a cross flue between each pair. The furnace bases have flat floors that appear to have been 2 metres (6 ft 7 in) wide internally, with arched roofs about 1.5 metres (4 ft 11 in) high, and the floors step up towards the flue-end by one course of brick every 3 metres (9.8 ft). There are vaulted tunnels/boxes under two of the furnaces about 2 metres (6 ft 7 in) from the end opposite the flues, but there are no apparent fireboxes. The furnace bricks are not firebricks, and there is no vitrification or slag deposit in them, suggesting they were used for roasting rather than smelting.

One chimney remains upslope of the furnaces, to 10 metres (33 ft) height. Downslope of the furnaces is a brick paved area, with water tanks and machinery footings stepping down the slope from it. Close to the creek are footings and base-logs that may have been the footings for a water pump.

The remains of another furnace is located some 45 metres (148 ft) to the east. This furnace is approximately 16 metres (52 ft) long, with a rubble plume extending another 35 metres (115 ft), possibly indicating a fallen chimney and the extension of the kiln itself.

The four conjoined furnaces, together with the separated one, are interpreted as being the five "reverberatory" furnaces built in 1886.

On the banks of Norton Creek are the remains of a 375 yards (343 m) long water-race that is said to have been associated with the arrasta. The water-race appears to have been lined along its sides with bricks as remains of these can be seen in some sections.

The 10-head stamper battery with steel frame is located about 80 metres (260 ft) from the creek. A concrete engine footing is located adjacent to the battery to the southeast. The posts for a partly-collapsed gantry, level with the top of the battery, lead south 22 metres (72 ft), then in a series of separate low embankments back to a mine adit 120 metres (390 ft) to the south. This appears to be the support embankment for a tramway linking the mine and is not demonstrated.

Some small brick rubble piles around the area may indicate other buildings. The area is also dotted with more recent core-drilling pads, is quite eroded and an upgrade of the access road to the adjacent opencut mine tends to confuse the interpretation of the historical remains.

A concrete-lined brick tank is embedded 2 metres (6 ft 7 in) deep into the hillside, and may be a header tank for battery water.

== Heritage listing ==
Norton Goldfield was listed on the Queensland Heritage Register on 27 October 2006 having satisfied the following criteria.

The place is important in demonstrating the evolution or pattern of Queensland's history.

The Norton Goldfield is important in demonstrating the evolution of Queensland's mining and settlement patterns from the late 1870s through to the 1940s; its success, failures and eventual abandonment closely linked to the difficulties encountered in treating the ore.

The place demonstrates rare, uncommon or endangered aspects of Queensland's cultural heritage.

The Norton gold roasting works is an unusual aspect of gold mining, not represented at any other known sites in southern and central Queensland. The operational association between the battery and the mine is uncommon and rare.

The place has potential to yield information that will contribute to an understanding of Queensland's history.

The technological evidence of the attempts to treat difficult ore bodies has the potential to yield information that will contribute to an understanding of Queensland's mining history and metallurgy.
