= Byellee to Monto railway line =

Former railway line in Queensland, Australia

Byellee to Monto Branch Railway was a branch railway that branched off the Boyne Valley west of Gladstone in Queensland, Australia.The Boyne Valley region was predominantly a dairying region and a railway had little justification. However a branch was justified in 1906 on the basis of large traffic in timber, fuel, limestone and flexing ores. Progressively opened between 1910 and 1931 the line branched from the North Coast line at Byellee a short distance west of Gladstone and struck a south-westerly route via Many Peaks and Mungungo to Monto.

The last regular train ran in 2002, and the final train on the line was a steam special run from Monto to Maryborough in May 2008 by the Australian Railway Historical Society.

From 2012, conversion of the corridor to a multi-use rail trail was discussed, and Boyne Burnett Inland Rail Trail Inc. was formed in July 2018. The Dawes Range Tunnel section of the Boyne Burnett Inland Rail Trail was opened on 11 September 2021 and the Burnett River Bridges section was opened on 10 September 2022.

== Route ==
=== Byellee to Many Peaks ===
The first section from Byellee (previously known as Boyne Valley Junction) to Many Peaks was opened on 25 July 1910 and sidings were established at Beecher, Burua, Talaba, Calliope River (now Calliope), Taragoola, Barmundu, Boynedale, Wietalaba, Nagoorin, Ubobo, Hellens, Littlemore and Builyan. Governor Fitzroy named Calliope after HMS Calliope which was anchored in Port Curtis (now Gladstone) harbour in 1854. The line was built to transport low grade ore from Many Peaks to Mount Morgan for processing. A train of copper flexing ore ran to Mount Morgan daily and a mixed train to Gladstone and return ran four days a week. Cream and agricultural goods provided the major source of revenue when the Many Peaks mine closed in 1918.

=== To Barrimoon ===
The next stage took the line via Golembil to Barrimoon on 17 August 1926. Although there was a sixteen-year gap in building, the route traverses steep mountainous country. A ten-kilometre (six-point-two-mile) section beyond Golembil required the construction of six tunnels totalling 730 metres (2,400 ft) to negotiate a 239-metre (784 ft) climb of the Dawes Range.

=== To Mungungo ===
On 7 July 1930, the line was opened via Kalpowar, Dakiel, Bancroft and Crana to Mungungo (then known as "Waratah" ) only 12 kilometres (7.5 mi) from Monto. It was announced that Waratah would be the terminus, but settlers insisted that Monto must be linked with Gladstone. Kalpowar was a timber milling settlement en route to Monto.

=== To Monto ===
On 6 July 1931 the line finally reached Monto via Bukali thus completing a semi circular inland link between Maryborough and Gladstone via the already completed line running north west from Mungar Junction through Biggenden, Gayndah, Mundubbera and Eidsvold. The line was suspended from use in 2002. It awaits the possibility of coal transport from the Monto region to Gladstone port.

== Tourism ==
The Dawes Range Tunnel section of the Boyne Burnett Inland Rail Trail was opened on 11 September 2021. The 26.28-kilometre (16.33 mi) section starts at Barrimoon Siding, Kalpowar and finishes at Builyan, Boyne Valley. This section contains 6 tunnels between Barrimoon Siding and Golembil Siding. Tunnel Six is the only place 100 year old rail and hogback sleepers are preserved on any of the disused rail corridors in the state. Hogback sleepers have a round top. They are hand hewn from the hard dense iron bark trees growing adjacent to the track. The trail also passes the historic township of Many Peaks with its Local Heritage listed attractions.

While not on the rail trail, the Heritage listed Many Peaks Railway Dam is accessed by getting on to the (very low traffic) bitumen road at Many Peaks and riding back less than a kilometre. There is a new shelter shed, history information signage, toilet block and elevated lookout over the old weir. There is no drinking water available.

== Heritage listing ==
The Local Heritage Register of Gladstone Regional Council lists

- Many Peaks / Barrimoon Railway Tunnels
- Many Peaks Railway Complex
- Many Peaks Road Bridge
- Many Peaks Railway Dam.

== See also ==
- Callide Valley railway line
