= Kalpowar =

- Town
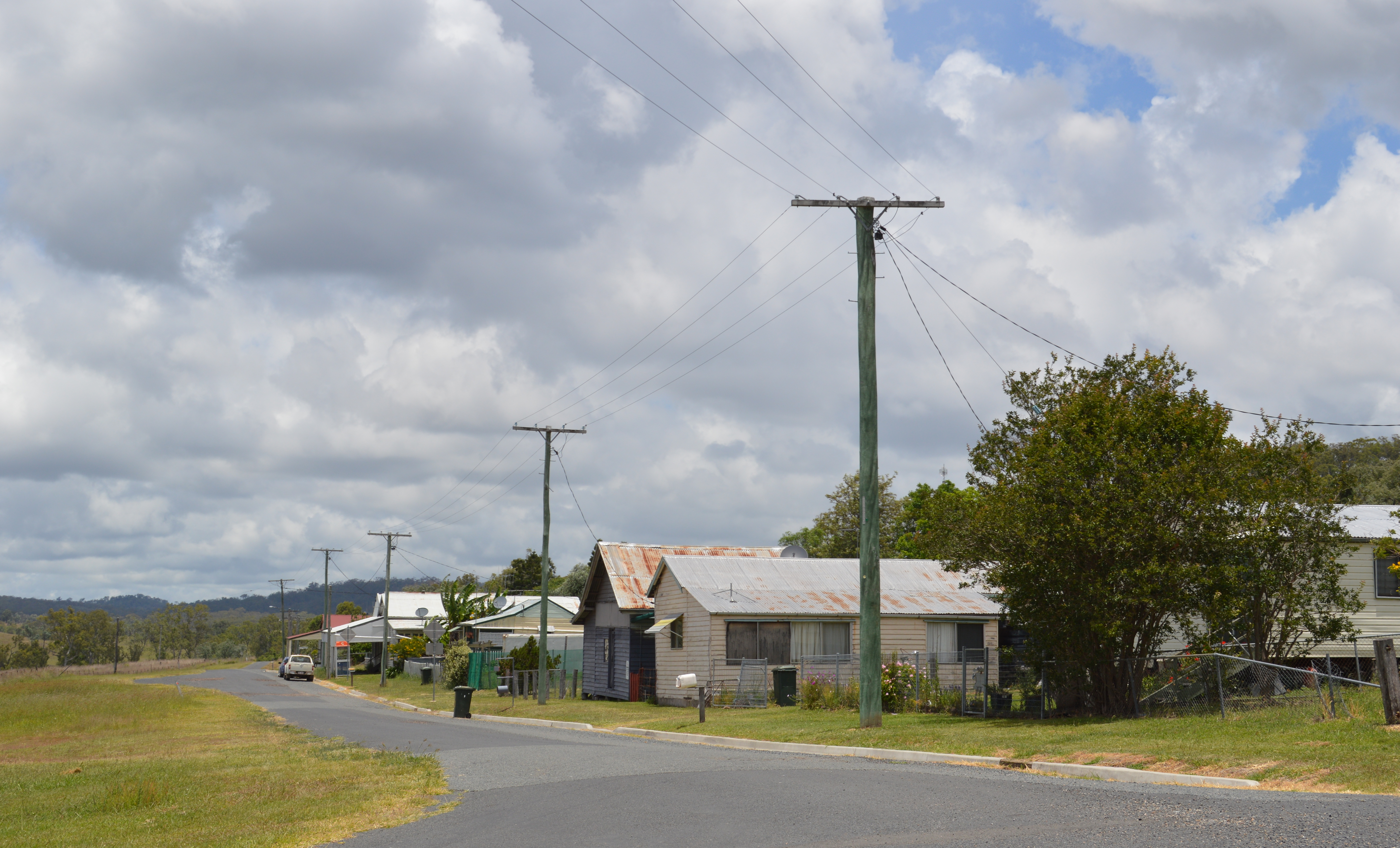
- Forest St, the main street of Kalpowar

- Interactive map of Kalpowar
- Coordinates: 24.695°S 151.305°E
- Country: Australia
- State: Queensland
- LGAs: North Burnett Region; Bundaberg Region
- Location: 59.6 km (37.0 mi) ENE of Monto; 116 km (72 mi) N of Bundaberg; 175 km (109 mi) WNW of Gayndah; 413 km (257 mi) NNW of Brisbane

Government
  - State electorate: Callide
  - Federal division: Flynn

Area
  - Total: 320.6 km^{2} (123.8 sq mi)

Population
  - Total: 53 (2021 census)
  - Density: 0.1653/km^{2} (0.428/sq mi)
- Postcode: 4630
Localities around Kalpowar
| Boyne Valley | Boyne Valley | Dalga |
| Monal | Kalpowar | Dalga |
| Bancroft | Yarrol | Molangul |

Kalpowar is a town in the North Burnett Region and a locality split between the North Burnett Region and the Bundaberg Region, in Queensland, Australia. In the 2021 census, the locality of Kalpowar had a population of 53 people.

== Geography ==
The Gladstone–Monto Road runs through from north-west to south-west.

Large areas from the north to the south of the locality are within the Kalpowar State Forest with parts of the north-east of the locality in the Borilla State Forest. Immediately south of the town of Kalpowar in the west of the locality are two small state forests: New Cannindah State Forest and Splinter Creek State Forest.

Kalpowar has the following mountains:

- Mount Bucanally (24.6719°S 151.2392°E) 530 metres (1,740 ft)
- Mount Fort William (24.6494°S 151.3419°E) 715 metres (2,346 ft)
- The Monument (24.6823°S 151.2776°E) 500 metres (1,600 ft)

== History ==
The town's name derives from the railway station name assigned by the Queensland Railways Department on 30 January 1928, which was an Aboriginal word meaning either pine tree or copper.

Many Peaks Provisional School opened on 23 October 1922 as part of the railway construction camp (57 Mile Camp) for the Gladstone to Monto railway line. As the camp moved to be at the area of the current construction, the school also relocated and renamed with it. In 1923 it was relocated south to the 63 Mile Camp. In 1926 it moved south to 67 Mile Camp and was renamed Barrimoon Provisional School (Barrimoon being the name of the railway station there). In 1927 it moved again to 74 Mile Camp and its name was changed in 1928 to Kalpowar Provisional School. In 1929 it moved to 82 Mile Camp and in September 1930 it was renamed Bancroft Provisional School. On 1 August 1931 it became Bancroft State School and remained there permanently until its closure on 31 December 1998.

Sixty-six Mile Camp Provisional School opened on 9 May 1923. Like the other construction camp school it relocated and renamed a number of times as the camp relocated to the current work area. In 1926 it became Seventy Mile Camp Provisional School. In 1927 it became Seventy-two Mile Camp Provisional School In 1929 it became Kalpowar Provisional School. In 1931 it became Mount Cannindah Provisional School. In 1933 it became Kalpowar Provisional School once again. It later became Kalpowar State School. It closed in 1997. It was on a 4-acre (1.6 ha) site at 2-6 Pine Street (24.6936°S 151.3041°E).

== Demographics ==
In the 2016 census, the locality of Kalpowar had a population of 67 people.

In the 2021 census, the locality of Kalpowar had a population of 53 people.

== Heritage listings ==
Kalpowar has a number of heritage-listed sites, including:

- Mount Cannindah Copper Mine & Town Site: Misfortune Road (24.67245°S 151.27885°E)

== Education ==
There are no schools in Kalpowar. The nearest government primary schools are Builyan State School in neighbouring Boyne Valley to the north and Monto State School in Monto to the south-west. The nearest government secondary school is Monto State High School, also in Monto, but this school is sufficiently distant from some parts of Kalpowar that distance education and boarding schools are other options.

== Attractions ==
Bills Window Lookout is on Kalpowar Forest Drive (24.7107°S 151.3463°E). There is a view over the Kolan River catchment.

The Dawes Range Tunnel section of the Boyne Burnett Inland Rail Trail was opened on 11 September 2021. The 26.28-kilometre (16.33 mi) section starts at Barrimoon Siding, Kalpowar and finishes at Builyan, Boyne Valley. This section contains 6 tunnels between Barrimoon Siding and Golembil Siding. It also passes the historic township of Many Peaks with its Local Heritage listed attractions - the Many Peaks Railway Complex, Many Peaks Railway Dam and Many Peaks Road Bridge.

The Bicentennial National Trail passes through Kalpowar in an east-west direction.
