= Boyne Valley, Queensland =

Boyne Valley
- Suburb
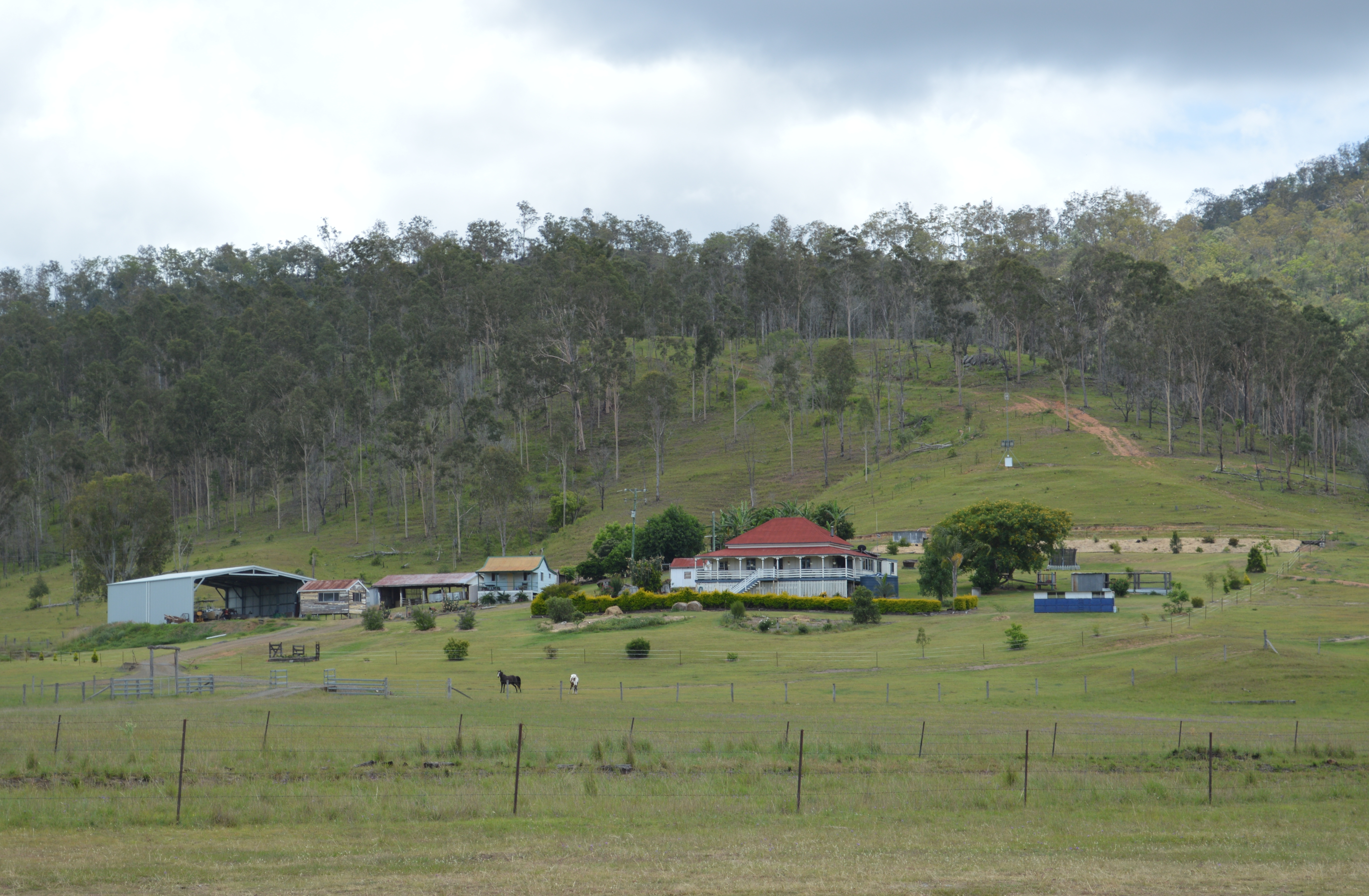
- A homestead in the Boyne Valley, 2017

- Interactive map of Boyne Valley
- Coordinates: 24.4536°S 151.2927°E
- Country: Australia
- State: Queensland
- LGA: Gladstone Region
- Location: 38.0 km (23.6 mi) SW of Miriam Vale; 94.7 km (58.8 mi) S of Gladstone; 184 km (114 mi) SE of Rockhampton; 479 km (298 mi) NNW of Brisbane

Government
  - State electorate: Callide
  - Federal division: Flynn

Area
  - Total: 1,183.6 km^{2} (457.0 sq mi)

Population
  - Total: 301 (2021 census)
  - Density: 0.2543/km^{2} (0.6587/sq mi)
- Time zone: UTC+10:00 (AEST)
- Postcode: 4680
Suburbs around Boyne Valley
Diglum	Boynedale	Bororen
Tablelands; Cania	Boyne Valley	Colosseum; Gindoran
Monal	Kalpowar	Dalga

The Boyne Valley is a rural locality in Gladstone Region, Queensland, Australia. The locality contains four small towns: Nagoorin, Ubobo, Builyan, and Many Peaks. In the 2021 census, Boyne Valley had a population of 301 people.

== Geography ==
It is in the valley of the Boyne River, in Central Queensland, approximately 500 kilometres (310 mi) north of Brisbane and 70 kilometres (43 mi) south west of Gladstone. "The Valley" as locals call it, is part of Gladstone's hinterland. Formerly within the Shire of Calliope, in 2008 it became part of Gladstone Region. It is in close proximity to Kroombit Tops National Park.

The Gladstone–Monto Road runs through from north to south-west.

== History ==
The Gladstone to Monto railway line opened its first section from Byellee (previously known as Boyne Valley Junction) to Many Peaks on 25 July 1910 with the following stations on the line within Boyne Valley:

- Wietalaba railway station (24.2922°S 151.2749°E)
- Nagoorin railway station (24.3574°S 151.2996°E)
- Ubobo railway station (24.4059°S 151.3226°E)
- Hellens railway station (24.4255°S 151.3324°E)
- Littlemore railway station (24.4606°S 151.3498°E)
- Builyan railway station (24.5278°S 151.3838°E)
- Many Peaks railway station (24.5392°S 151.3785°E)

with the second section to Barrimoon completed on 17 August 1926 including:

- Golembil railway station (24.6021°S 151.3154°E)

The line closed to regular services in 2002 with the final train on the line being a steam special run from Monto to Maryborough in 2005.

Nagoorin State School opened on 18 October 1915.

Builyan State School opened on 4 December 1922.

Ubobo State School opened on 23 March 1927.

== Demographics ==
In the 2006 census, Boyne Valley had a population of 646 people.

In the 2011 census, Boyne Valley had a population of 379 people.

In the 2016 census, Boyne Valley had a population of 358 people.

In the 2021 census, Boyne Valley had a population of 301 people.

== Heritage listings ==
Boyne Valley has a number of heritage-listed sites, including:

- Gladstone-Monto Road, Ubobo: Soldier Settler House
- Norton Road, Nagoorin: Norton Goldfield
- 5 Railway Terrace, Ubobo: Ububo QCWA
- 7 Railway Terrace: the Ubobo Station Mistress's Residence is now used as the headquarters of the Boyne Valley Historical Society

== Education ==
Ubobo State School is a government primary (Prep–6) school for boys and girls at Cedarvale Road (24.4067°S 151.3217°E). In 2017, the school had an enrolment of 12 students with 3 teachers (2 full-time equivalent) and 4 non-teaching staff (2 full-time equivalent). The school was temporarily closed in late 2019 due to a lack of enrolments, and remains closed as of July 2022.

Builyan State School is a government primary (Prep–6) school for boys and girls at Gladstone Road (24.5293°S 151.3854°E). In 2017, the school had an enrolment of 8 students with 2 teachers (1 full-time equivalent) and 4 non-teaching staff (2 full-time equivalent). Enrolments increased to 10 students in February 2021.

Nagoorin State School is a government primary (Prep–6) school for boys and girls at 2 Ubobo Street (24.3516°S 151.2999°E). In 2017, the school had an enrolment of 12 students with 2 teachers (1 full-time equivalent) and 4 non-teaching staff (2 full-time equivalent). Enrolments increased to 23 students in February 2021.

The three schools get together on a regular basis, providing students with the opportunity to learn and socialise with children of a similar age.

There are no secondary schools in Boyne Valley. The nearest government secondary school is Miriam Vale State School in Miriam Vale which offers secondary schooling to Year 10. For Years 11 and 12, the nearest government schools are Calliope State High School in Calliope, Tannum Sands State High School in Tannum Sands to the north, and Monto State High School in Monto to the south-west. Not Some parts of Boyne Valley are too distant for these schools; the alternatives are distance education and boarding school.

== Attractions ==
- The Dawes Range Tunnel section of the Boyne Burnett Inland Rail Trail was opened on 11 September 2021. The 26.28-kilometre (16.33 mi) section starts at Barrimoon Siding, Kalpowar and finishes at Builyan, Boyne Valley. This section contains 6 tunnels between Barrimoon Siding and Golembil Siding. It also passes the historic township of Many Peaks with its Local Heritage listed attractions – the Many Peaks Railway Complex, Many Peaks Railway Dam and Many Peaks Road Bridge.
- the Boyne Valley Historical Cottage, opened in 1988 by the Boyne Valley Historical Society Inc. The historical display. located at Railway Terrace, Ubobo, is open by appointment.

== See also ==
- Beautiful Betsy
- Castle Tower National Park
- Kroombit Tops National Park
- Lake Awoonga
- List of valleys of Australia
