= HMS Calliope =

Five ships and a shore establishment of the Royal Navy have borne the name HMS Calliope after the muse Calliope in Greek mythology:

- HMS Calliope (1808) was a 10-gun Cherokee-class brig-sloop launched in 1808 and broken up in 1829.
- HMS Calliope (1837) was a 28-gun sixth rate launched in 1837. She was used as a floating chapel in 1860 and a factory from 1865. She was broken up in 1883.
- HMS Calliope (1884) was a Calypso-class corvette or third class cruiser launched in 1884. She was used as a Royal Naval Reserve drill ship from 1907, was renamed HMS Helicon in 1915 and took back the name of HMS Calliope in 1931. She was sold in 1951.
- HMS Calliope (1914) was a C-class light cruiser launched in 1914, the lead ship of the Calliope subgroup. She was sold in 1931.
- HMS Calliope was originally the Shoreham-class sloop HMS Falmouth. She was launched in 1932, and renamed HMS Calliope in 1952 when she replaced the 1884 HMS Calliope as the RNR's drill ship. She was broken up in 1968.
- HMS Calliope (shore establishment), one of fourteen Royal Naval Reserve units, is a "stone frigate" situated on the Gateshead bank of the River Tyne, between the Tyne Bridge and the Gateshead Millennium Bridge.
