= Glassford Creek Smelter Sites =

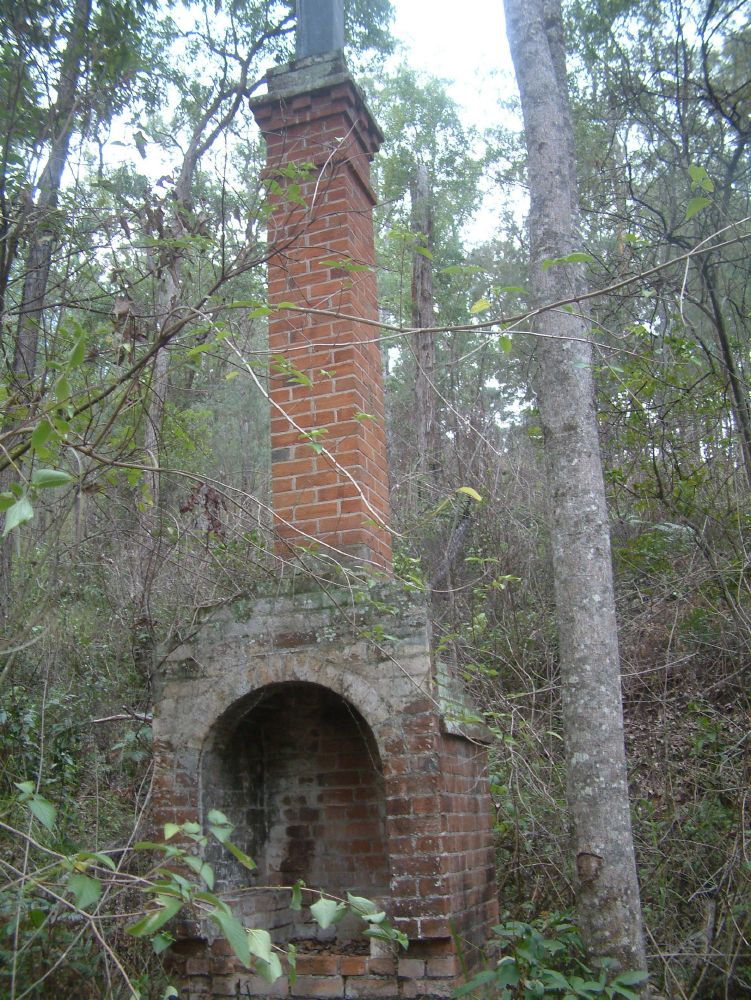
- Glassford Creek Smelter Sites, 2005

- Location within Queensland Location within Australia
- 24.5654°S 151.2394°E
- Location: Glassford State Forest, off Many Peaks Road, Many Peaks, Gladstone Region, Queensland, Australia

History
- Design period: 1900–1914 (early 20th century)
- Built: c. 1903

Queensland Heritage Register
- Official name: Glassford Creek Smelter Sites, Glassford Creek Copper Smelters
- Type: state heritage (archaeological, built)
- Designated: 4 July 2006
- Reference no.: 602389
- Significant period: 1900s (fabric); 1903–1908 (Smelter use); 1893–1921 (historical mining in area).
- Significant components: slag pile/slag heap, chimney/chimney stack, mullock heap, mounting block/stand, pit – machinery, flue, wall/s – retaining, machinery/plant/equipment – mining/mineral processing, formation – tramway, smelter

Glassford Creek Smelter Sites are the heritage-listed remains of a former smelter at Glassford State Forest, off Many Peaks Road, Many Peaks, Gladstone Region, Queensland, Australia. It was built c. 1903. It is also known as Glassford Creek Copper Smelters. It was added to the Queensland Heritage Register on 4 July 2006.

== History ==
The Glassford Creek copper lode was discovered in 1893. Initially it was mined for silver then in 1896 for gold and subsequently for copper. The two most important lodes on the Glassford field were the Blue Bag Mine in the north and the Lady Inez Mine in the south. Practically all production on the field came from these two lodes with the Blue Bag Mine the major producer.

In 1897, a ten-head battery was erected at Glassford Creek. This led to a total of 560 long tons (570 t) of ore being mined for a return of 166 ounces (4,700 g) of gold. When copper sulphides soured, the amalgamating tables crushing was discontinued and prospecting reverted to copper. An 1897 plan suggests that the gold battery was located within the vicinity of the later copper smelters.

In 1900, the Boompa Copper Company made plans to erect reverberatory smelters. When the reverberatory furnaces were completed in 1903 it appears that smelting commenced and continued through to 1908. Water-jacket furnaces were built but do not appear to have been completed until 1906. The mined ore was put through a rock-breaker and over shaker tables where it was handpicked prior to going to the smelter.

The Boompa Copper Company went into liquidation in 1908, and in 1915 the water-jacket smelter was dismantled. Residues in the bases of the furnaces were leased out with 8 long tons (8.1 t) of copper matte being recovered. The amount of matte recovered in this salvage operation indicates that the methods implemented by the company were inefficient and that the smelters were either ineffectively managed or poorly constructed. The salvage of the matte resulted in a yield of 1 long ton (1.0 t) 11 cwt of copper, 80 ounces (2,300 g) of gold and 113 ounces (3,200 g) of silver. This salvage operation was carried out in conjunction with similar work at the Mount Hector smelter, which suggests that the Glassford Creek and Mount Hector mines had a common leaseholder at this time.

Originally the Blue Bag Mine operated as an open-cut, however when operations became dangerous as the removal of overburden increased the depth of the open-cut, shafts and tunnels were excavated from the base of the open-cut to afford access to the ore.

The available demographic figures show that the movement of people in and out of the Glassford area was closely aligned to the success and otherwise of the mines. For example, at the beginning of 1907 Glassford had a population of 346 but by the end of that year numbers immediately prior to the Boompa Copper Company going into liquidation had declined to 40.

In 1916 Hunting and Clark took over the Blue Bag Mine and a new shaft was sunk. From the 227 long tons (231 t) of ore sent for treatment they received a return of 22 long tons (22 t) of copper valued at £2,552, 119 ounces (3,400 g) of gold valued at £480 and 155 ounces (4,400 g) of silver valued at £19. At the end of 1916 the mine was sold to a southern syndicate for floating. At this time it appears that there were approximately 25,000 long tons (25,000 t) of ore in the dumps located within close proximity of the smelters.

When WA Doyle made application in 1918 for assistance to re-establish the copper smelters Government Geologist Ball undertook investigations, the result being that there was insufficient ore to warrant a re-establishment of the smelters.

However, further mining was undertaken at the Blue Bag Mine and at the Lady Inez Mine after 1920 with the mined ore being shipped to Chillagoe for treatment. Plans were made to install a new plant and powerhouse but these plans did not eventuate and mining ceased in 1921. Following this the Department of Mines took over the machinery. By 1941, all the buildings in the village of Glassford had been removed, the mining plant dismantled and most of it shipped elsewhere with only the remnants of the water-jacket furnace remaining on site.

At the Miriam Vale and Monto community workshops conducted in the 1990s as part of the Comprehensive Regional Assessment for the South East Queensland bio-geographic region's Regional Forest Agreement, Glassford Creek Smelter Sites were considered to satisfy the threshold indicators for National Estate social value.

== Description ==
The Glassford mines, the Blue Bag and the Lady Inez and smelters are accessed via a track leading to Glassford Creek from the Monto-Many Peaks Road. The smelters are located approximately 7.5 kilometres (4.7 mi) along the track from the last farmstead. Beyond the last farming property, the road is a four-wheel drive track that crosses Glassford Creek several times.

The smelter 1 site has a standing chimney with a height of approximately 18 metres (59 ft). The smelter area is very overgrown with vegetation covering the collapsed remains of the smelter's brickwork. Little can be interpreted, though it does appear that this is the site of the reverberatory furnaces. Adjacent to the smelter and the chimney is a series of at least 6 pits. It is possible that there could be more pits but the area is covered by galvanised iron from the roof of the collapsed work's building. The six pits that are visible are in two rows of three, each of the pits is two metres in width, with their lengths increasing from 1 to 2 metres (3 ft 3 in to 6 ft 7 in) to 2.5 metres (8 ft 2 in). Adjacent to the pits are the remains of standing and collapsed posts and roof trusses of a 7-by-7.5-metre (23 by 25 ft) building. A three hopper feed bin that may be the remains of a spitzkasten classifer is located near the chimney. A small slagheap covers an area 29 by 20 metres (95 by 66 ft). Approximately 66 metres (217 ft) to the southwest is a flat area accessed by a road that runs south towards the Lady Inez Mine and northwest towards Smelter 2 and the Blue Bag Mine. This flat area could be an ore sorting/storage floor.

The Smelter 2 site has a standing chimney connected by the stone base of a short horizontal flue to a standing brick smelter-support structure, which presumably supported a water-jacket furnace. This structure is 9 metres (30 ft) long by 2.5 metres (8 ft 2 in) wide and 3 metres (9.8 ft) tall. It is partitioned into two sections, with a sloping internal floor inclined down to two access holes in the front face at ground level. Part of the front wall of the structure has collapsed. A series of engine footings are located near the smelter, and a large boiler with tall chimney attached has fallen off one of these engine beds. The associated slagheap extends over an area 48 by 32 metres (157 by 105 ft), and consists of pavement-like slag poured into formwork, as evidenced on other water-jacket smelter sites. The slag formwork at the edge of the slagheap is old railway rails.

Behind the smelter and the engine sites is a stone retaining wall up to 1.8 metres (5 ft 11 in) high. Above this wall is a flat area that appears to have been an ore sorting or treatment floor. To the east of the smelter area is a 28-metre (92 ft) long tip of mullock, and to the east of that again is a large area of mullock and ore dump that has been cut through in several places. The cutting was shown in the 1941 plan of the site. A track noted in 1941 as a tramway leads off to the Blue Bag Mine in an easterly direction. There are several areas with mullock around them on the hill slope above Smelter 2 that may be filled-in shafts.

== Heritage listing ==
Glassford Creek Smelter Sites was listed on the Queensland Heritage Register on 4 July 2006 having satisfied the following criteria.

The place is important in demonstrating the evolution or pattern of Queensland's history.

The remains of the Glassford Creek smelter reflect a typical pattern for small copper fields in Queensland, with initial prospecting followed by more substantial but short-lived company development, tailing off into small-scale mining often recovering values ignored by earlier miners.

The place demonstrates rare, uncommon or endangered aspects of Queensland's cultural heritage.

The Glassford Creek Smelters Sites are well preserved for their age and type, and provide uncommon and endangered evidence of this scale of a copper mining enterprise.

The place has potential to yield information that will contribute to an understanding of Queensland's history.

The Glassford Creek Smelters Sites have the potential to provide information that will further existing knowledge of the nature of mining technology utilised during this period of Queensland's mining history.

The place has a strong or special association with a particular community or cultural group for social, cultural or spiritual reasons.

The Glassford Creek Smelter Sites are considered by the regional community to be a significant part of the history of European settlement in the Boyne Valley. The Smelter Sites are valued as an historical asset not only for the connection that they provide with the past but also for their educational and interpretational values.
