= Ubobo =

- Town
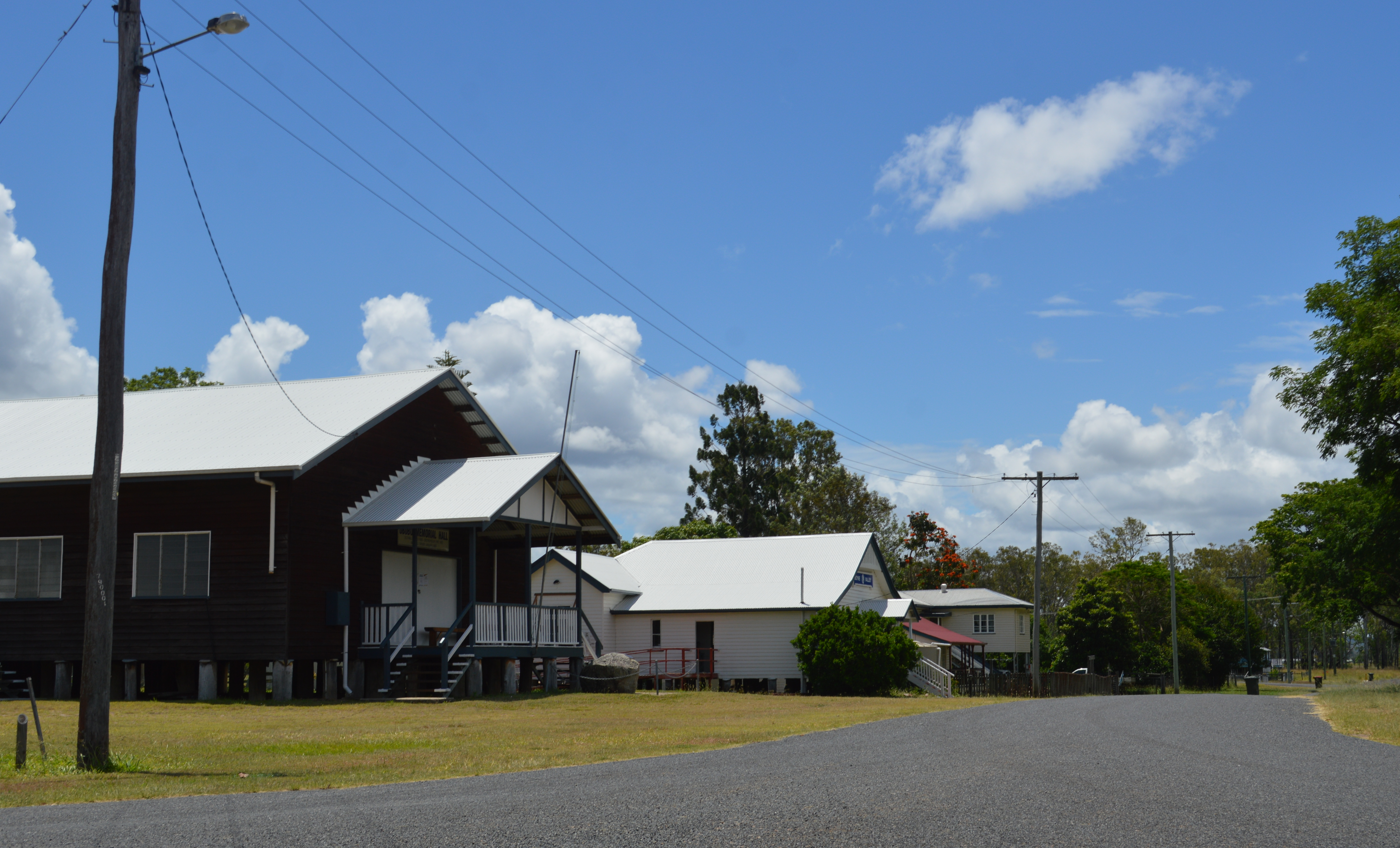
- Railway Terrace, 2017. From the left the buildings shown are the Ubobo Memorial Hall, the QCWA rest rooms, the former Station Mistress' house and a private dwelling

- Coordinates: 24.4047°S 151.3211°E
- Country: Australia
- State: Queensland
- LGA: Gladstone Region
- Location: 54.3 km (33.7 mi) SSE of Calliope; 77.6 km (48.2 mi) S of Gladstone CBD; 167 km (104 mi) SE of Rockhampton; 480 km (300 mi) NNW of Brisbane

Government
  - State electorate: Callide
  - Federal division: Flynn
- Time zone: UTC+10:00 (AEST)
- Postcode: 4680

Ubobo is a rural town in the locality of Boyne Valley in the Gladstone Region, Queensland, Australia.

== Geography ==
Ubobo is located south of Gladstone and Calliope along Highway 69 in Central Queensland, Australia. It is one of four small townships within the locality of Boyne Valley, along with Nagoorin, Builyan, and Many Peaks.

Ubobo is a small town found in the middle of the Boyne Valley, which is mostly made up of family farms that have been passed on to the next generation over the years.

== History ==
The Town of Ubobo appears on a 1921 survey plan U7251. It was established as one of the soldier settlements created after World War I.

The name comes from the railway station name, assigned in 1910 by the Queensland Railways Department and is believed to be an Aboriginal word meaning wild arrowroot. The railway station was on the Gladstone to Monto railway line.

The first school building was originally built as the Glassford Creek State School at the end of the 19th century, and was dismantled and moved to Ubobo where it opened as Ubobo State School 23 March 1927. A larger building was opened in 1932 and the original building offered for sale.

Circa August 1931, Sunday School classes began in the Ubobo Hall organised by St Saviour's Anglican Church in Gladstone. Circa May 1934, William Alexander Fancourt McDonald, of Wietalaba, donated land for an Anglican church in Ubobo. Later, St Luke's Anglican Church was opened at 4995 Gladstone Monto Road (24.4071°S 151.3240°E). It is now closed and is used for commercial purposes.

The Boyne Valley branch of the Queensland Country Women's Association (QCWA) was established on 21 November 1935.

On 24 December 1953, the Ububo Memorial Hall was burned down in a fire. In January 1955, a new memorial hall was opened.

The QCWA hall in Ububo was officially opened in April 1959. The building was originally built in 1914 as the post office at Many Peaks. It was later moved to Littlemore (approx 5 kilometres (3.1 mi) south of Ubobo) and become the Littlemore Memorial Hall. The QCWA branch had been using the old Ububo Memorial Hall until it was destroyed. The QCWA were gifted the Littlemore Memorial Hall which was relocated to 5 Railway Terrace, Ububo in 1958.

In 1985, a building was relocated from Calliope to Ubobo to become St Mary's Catholic Church.

The Ubobo Post Office was closed on the 4th of August 1993.

== Amenities ==
The town is made up of

- the Ubobo General Store
- the local garage
- two small churches
- a well-used QCWA hall
- the Boyne Valley Community Discovery Center has been restored by volunteers and provides camping and accommodation.
- St Mary's Catholic Church at 4985 Gladstone Monto Road (24.4065°S 151.3236°E).
- the Boyne Valley Historical Cottage, opened in 1988 by the Boyne Valley Historical Society Inc. The historical display. located at Railway Terrace, Ubobo, is open by appointment.

== Education ==
Ubobo State School is a government primary (Prep-6) school for boys and girls at Cedarvale Road (24.4067°S 151.3217°E). In 2017, the school had an enrolment of 12 students with 3 teachers (2 full-time equivalent) and 4 non-teaching staff (2 full-time equivalent). Enrolments had been declining for several years, and at the start of 2019 the school had only 2 students. After both students left to attend other schools, the school was temporarily closed and remains so as of February 2025.

There are no secondary schools in the Boyne Valley. The nearest government secondary schools are Miriam Vale State School (to Year 10) in Miriam Vale to the east and Calliope State High School (to Year 12) in Calliope to the north.

== Heritage listings ==
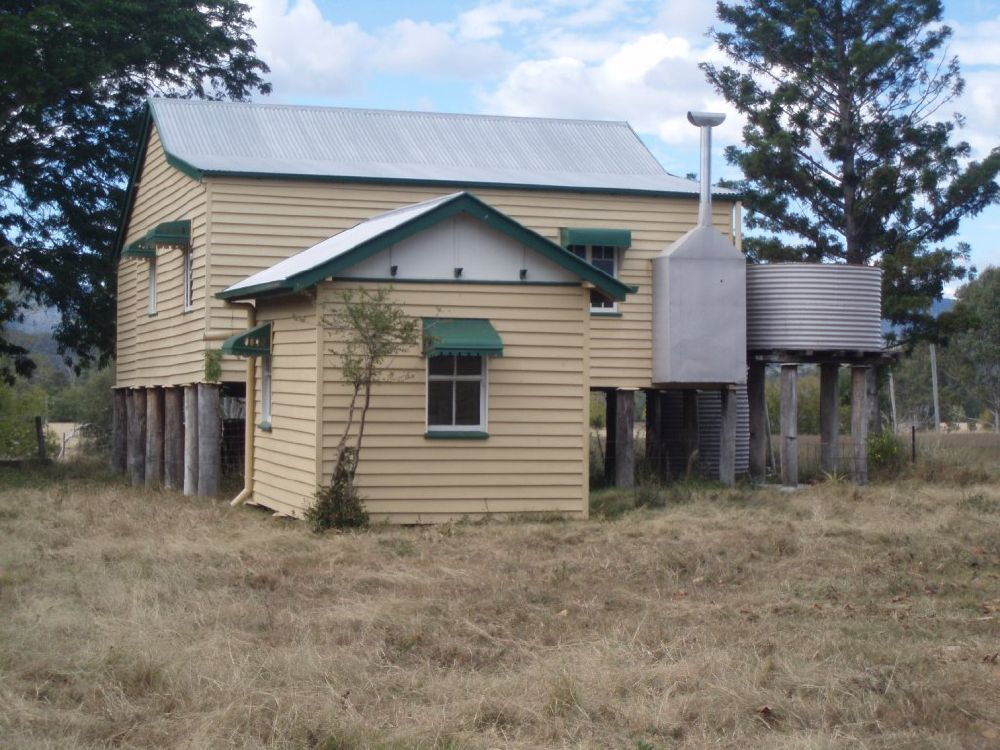
Soldier Settler House, 2009

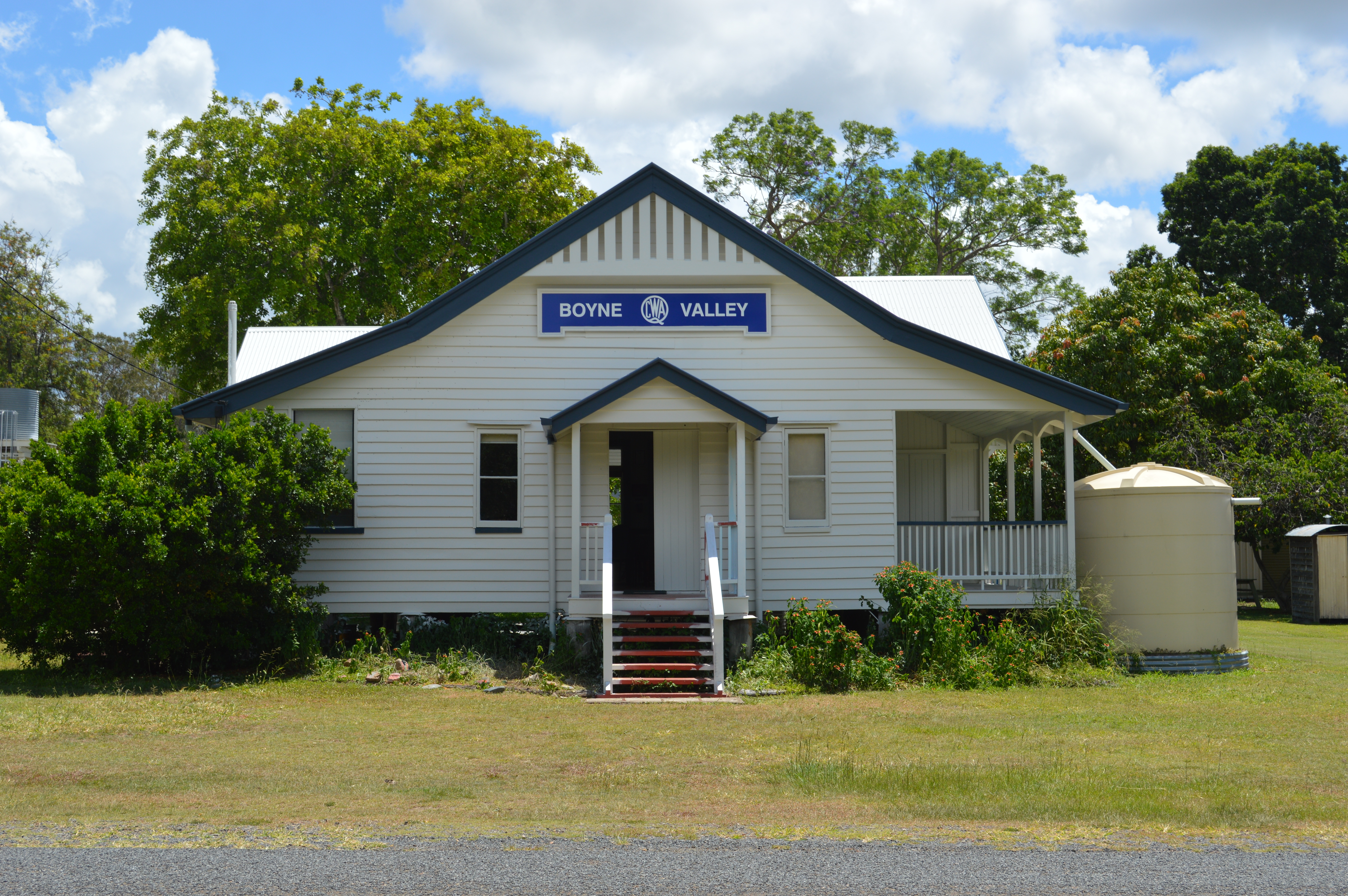
Boyne Valley QCWA Hall, 2017

Ubobo has a number of heritage-listed sites, including:

- Soldier Settler House, Gladstone-Monto Road
- Ububo QCWA, 5 Railway Terrace
- the Ubobo Station Mistress's Residence is now used as the headquarters of the Boyne Valley Historical Society, 7 Railway Terrace

== Further links ==
- Ubobo State School (2002), Ubobo State School : a collection of memories : celebrating 75 years of state education, 1927 - 2002, Ubobo State School
