= Many Peaks, Queensland =

Many Peaks
- Town
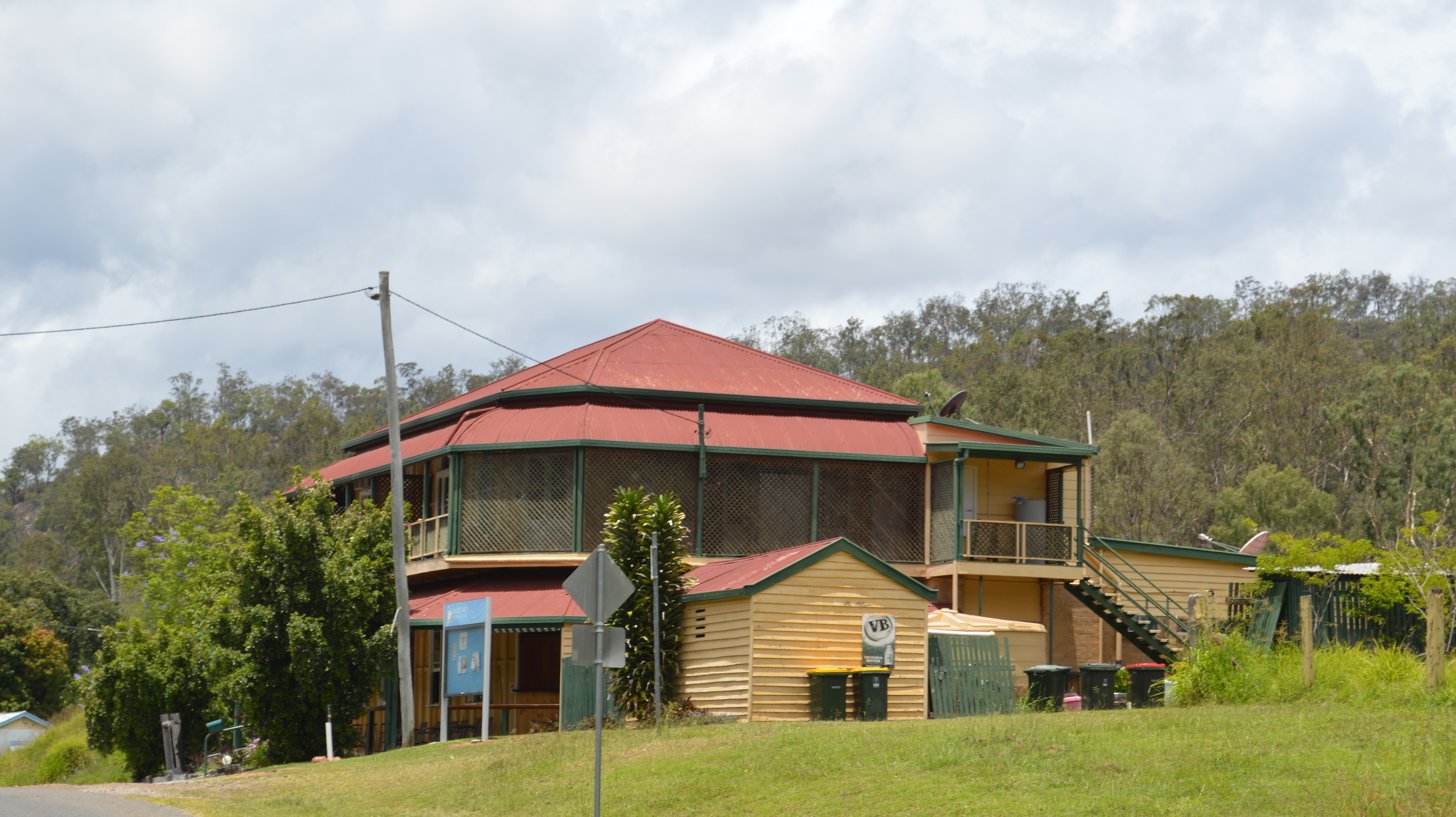
- The Grand Hotel in Many Peaks, 2017

- Coordinates: 24.5441°S 151.3713°E
- Country: Australia
- State: Queensland
- LGA: Gladstone Region
- Location: 40.5 km (25.2 mi) SW of Miriam Vale; 97.2 km (60.4 mi) S of Gladstone; 187 km (116 mi) SSE of Rockhampton; 482 km (300 mi) NNW of Brisbane

Government
  - State electorate: Callide
  - Federal division: Flynn
- Time zone: UTC+10:00 (AEST)
- Postcode: 4680

Many Peaks is a town in Gladstone Region in Queensland, Australia. It is one of four small townships within the locality of Boyne Valley along with Nagoorin, Builyan and Ubobo.

== History ==
Gureng Gureng (also known as Gooreng Gooreng, Goreng Goreng, Goeng, Gurang, Goorang Goorang, Korenggoreng) is an Australian Aboriginal language spoken by the Gureng Gureng people. The Gooreng Gooreng language region includes the towns of Bundaberg, Gin Gin and Miriam Vale extending south towards Childers, inland to Monto and Mt Perry.

The township was briefly called Nanandu, but the name was changed back to Many Peaks in July 1909 to avoid being confused with the town of Nanango. The Many Peaks Range runs to the east and south east of the Boyne Valley. The Many Peaks Boarding House had been conducted by Mrs Nina Jensen at Nanandu for several years previously.

Nanandu Post Office opened by August 1907, was renamed Many Peaks in July 1909 and closed in 1977.

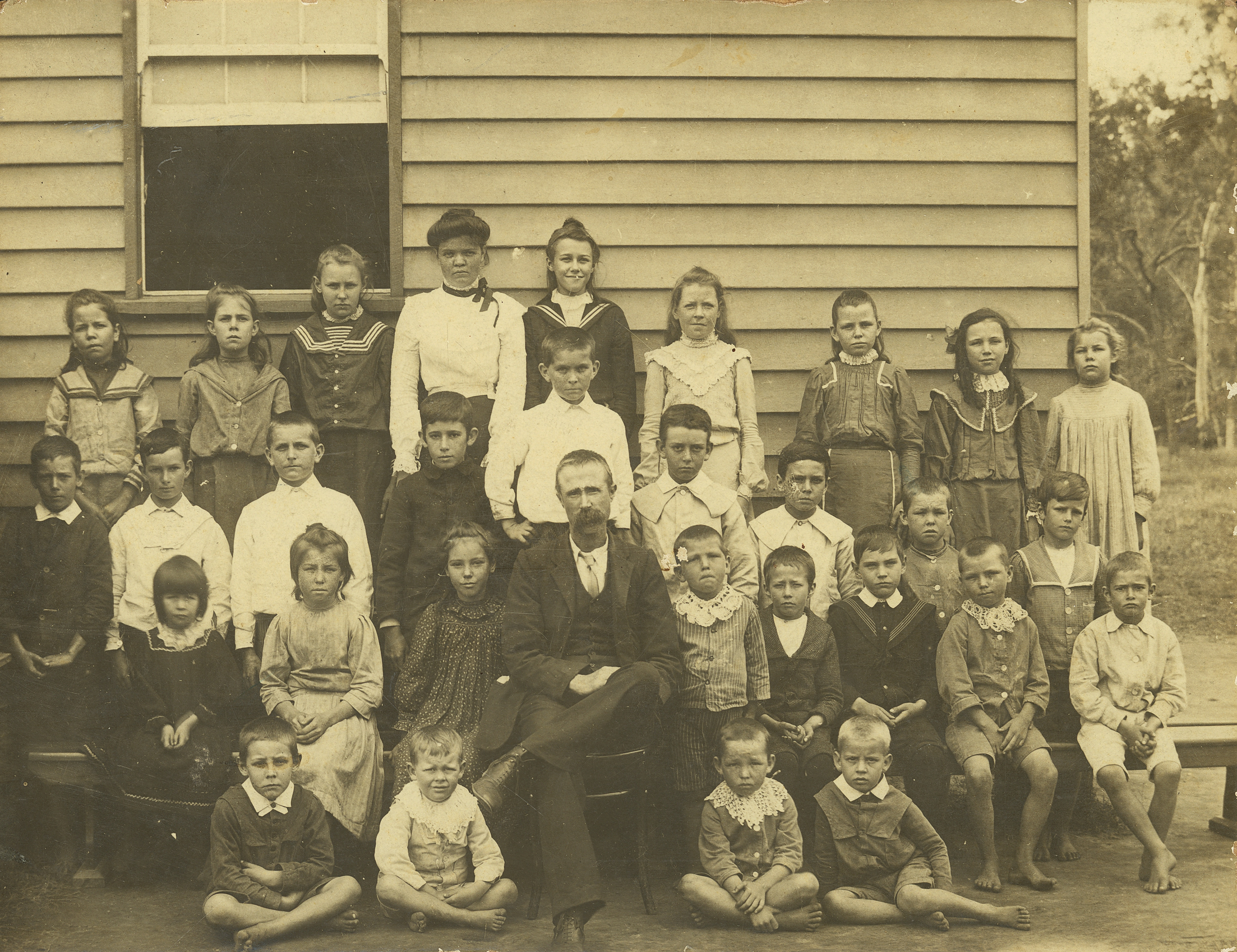
Students and teacher, Many Peaks State School, around the time of its opening

Nanandu Provisional School opened in March 1909. On 1 April 1909, it was renamed Many Peaks State School. It closed in 1973. It was at 5 Wentworth Street (24.5446°S 151.3727°E).

Many Peaks Hospital was opened on October 15th 1909 and remained in use until the 1990s when the Boyne Valley Primary Healthcare Clinic was opened in nearby Builyan.

Three shops were destroyed by fire in Many Peaks in January 1916 with the Theatre Grand, a large building, also damaged due to a lack of an available fire brigade or sufficient water to fight the blaze.

Nicholas Gianis Veneris (Nicholas Hellen) purchased a property with an established café and fruit orchard in Many Peaks in 1915-1916 and in time he was to become one of the first Greek immigrants to serve as a Councillor for the Calliope Shire Council.

Many Peaks Railway Camp Provisional School opened on 23 Oct 1922 as part of the railway construction camp (57 Mile Camp) for the Gladstone to Monto railway line. In 1923, it was relocated south to the 63 Mile Camp. In 1926, it moved south to 67 Mile Camp and was renamed Barrimoon Provisional School (Barrimoon being the name of the railway station there). In 1927, it moved again to 74 Mile Camp and its name was changed in 1928 to Kalpowar Provisional School. In 1929, it moved to 82 Mile Camp and in September 1930 it was renamed Bancroft Provisional School. On 1 August 1931, it became Bancroft State School and remained there permanently until its closure on 31 December 1998.

== Heritage listings ==
Many Peaks has a number of heritage-listed sites, including:

- Glassford Creek Smelter Sites, off Many Peaks Road
- The Builyan Cemetery (formerly the Many Peaks Cemetery) is on the Gladstone Regional Council's Local Heritage Register. An area of 4 acres (1.6 ha) at Many Peaks was proclaimed a cemetery reserve in 1910.
- The Grand Hotel was opened in 1909 and was one of five hotels in the town. The hotel was originally the Railway Hotel, which was located close to the Gladstone railway station. It was dismantled in 1907 and every item was carefully numbered and then transported to Many Peaks, where it was rebuilt. . The Many Peaks Roll of Honour, honouring town residents who died fighting in World War I, is also located in the dining room. The hotel was closed in 2020, and reopened in December 2024 under new owners Desley and Craig O'Grady.
- The Many Peaks Railway Complex.
- Many Peaks Railway Dam.
- Many Peaks Road Bridge.

== Education ==
There are no schools in Many Peaks. However, there are three government primary schools at the other Boyne Valley townships with the nearest being Builyan State School. The Ubobo State School in Ubobo was temporarily closed in 2019 and remains non-operational.

There are no government secondary schools in Boyne Valley. The nearest government secondary school is Miriam Vale State School in Miriam Vale which offers secondary schooling to Year 10. For Years 11 and 12, the nearest government secondary schools are Calliope State High School in Calliope and Monto State High School in Monto.

== Attractions ==
The Dawes Range Tunnel section of the Boyne Burnett Inland Rail Trail was opened on 11 September 2021. The 26.28-kilometre (16.33 mi) section starts at Barrimoon Siding, Kalpowar and finishes at Builyan, Boyne Valley. The trail passes through the historic township of Many Peaks. This section contains 6 tunnels between Barrimoon Siding and Golembil Siding. The tunnels are Local Heritage listed. Tunnel Six is the only place 100 year old rail and hogback sleepers are preserved on any of the disused rail corridors in the state. Hogback sleepers have a round top. They are hand hewn from the hard dense iron bark trees growing adjacent to the track.

While not on the rail trail, the Heritage listed Many Peaks Railway Dam is accessed by getting on to the (very low traffic) bitumen road at Many Peaks and riding back less than a kilometre. There is a new shelter shed, history information signage, toilet block and elevated lookout over the old weir. There is no drinking water available.

== See also ==
- List of schools in Central Queensland
