= Nagoorin =

- Town
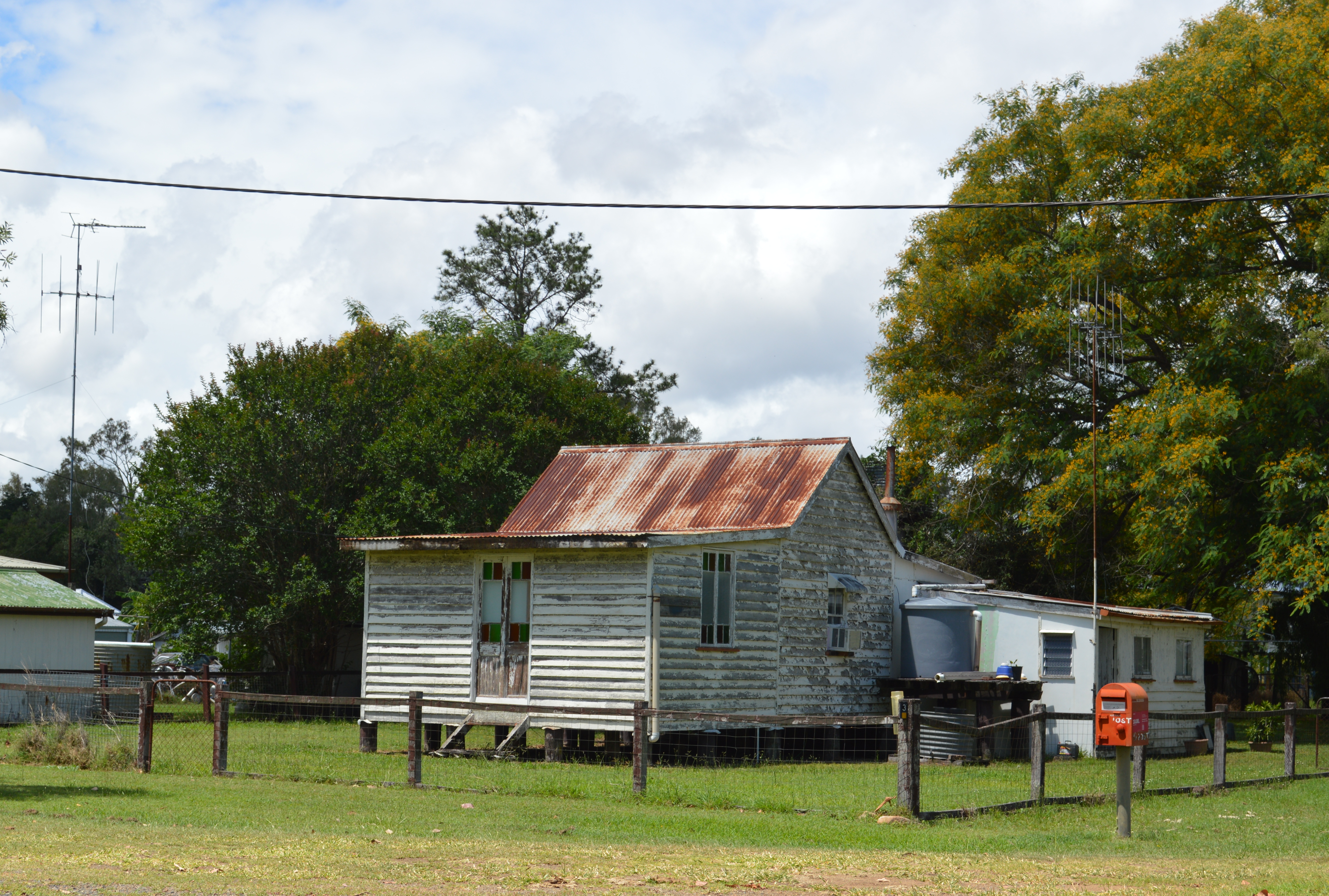
- A house in Nagoorin, 2017

- Coordinates: 24.3541°S 151.3005°E
- Country: Australia
- State: Queensland
- LGA: Gladstone Region
- Location: 44 km (27 mi) W of Miriam Vale; 70 km (43 mi) S of Gladstone; 487 km (303 mi) NW of Brisbane

Government
  - State electorate: Callide
  - Federal division: Flynn
- Time zone: UTC+10:00 (AEST)
- Postcode: 4680

Nagoorin is a rural town in Gladstone Region, Queensland, Australia. It is one of four small townships within the locality of Boyne Valley along with Ubobo, Builyan, and Many Peaks.

== History ==
Nargoorin State School opened on 18 October 1915.

Nagoorin Post Office opened by 1920 (a receiving office had been open from 1910, originally known as Degalil) and closed by 1982.

Lake View Provisional School opened on 9 February 1910 but closed on 31 June 1917. On 27 February 1920 it reopened. It closed on 31 December 1936.

Nagoorin State School opened on 18 October 15.

== Heritage listings ==
Nagoorin has a number of heritage-listed sites, including:

- Norton Goldfield, Norton Road

== Education ==
Nagoorin State School is a government primary (Prep-6) school for boys and girls at 2 Ubobo Street (24.3516°S 151.2999°E). In 2017, the school had an enrolment of 12 students with 2 teachers (1 full-time equivalent) and 4 non-teaching staff (2 full-time equivalent).

There are no secondary schools in Boyne Valley. The nearest government secondary school is Miriam Vale State School which offers secondary schooling to Year 10. For Years 11 and 12, the nearest government secondary schools are Calliope State High School in Calliope, Gladstone State High School in West Gladstone, Rosedale State School in Rosedale, and Monto State High School in Monto.
