= Builyan, Queensland =

Builyan Queensland
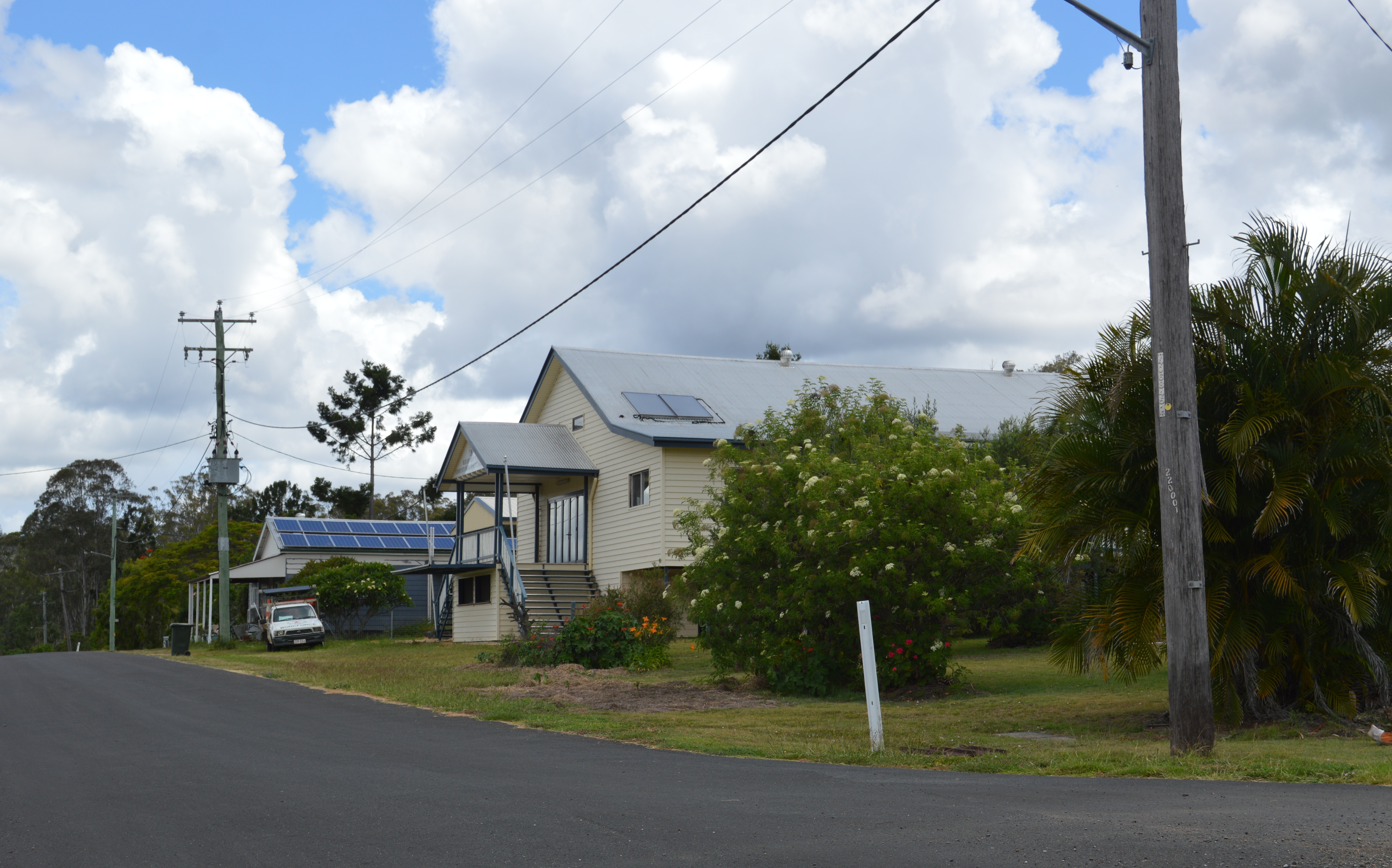
- Pine St, Builyan; 2017

- Coordinates: 24.53°S 151.3841°E
- Postcode(s): 4680
- Location: 65.2 km (41 mi) NE of Monto; 71.7 km (45 mi) S of Calliope; 95.0 km (59 mi) S of Gladstone; 501 km (311 mi) NNW of Brisbane
- LGA(s): Gladstone Region
- State electorate(s): Callide
- Federal division(s): Flynn

Builyan is a town in Gladstone Region, Central Queensland, Australia. It is one of four small townships within the locality of Boyne Valley along with Nagoorin, Ubobo, and Many Peaks.

== History ==
The name Builyan is an Aboriginal word, meaning stone curlew.

The Builyan Cemetery (formerly the Many Peaks Cemetery) is on the Gladstone Regional Council's Local Heritage Register. An area of 4 acres at Many Peaks was proclaimed a cemetery reserve in 1910.

Builyan State School opened on 4 December 1922.

Builyan Post Office opened on 1 July 1927 (a receiving office had been open from 1912) and closed on 13 August 1993.

Builyan Hall was opened in August 1950, built from local timbers with a dance floor of spotted gum. A ceremony at the hall attended by 500-600 people switched on mains electricity to the town on 30 October 1954.

The former Gladstone to Monto railway runs through the centre of Builyan.

== Education ==
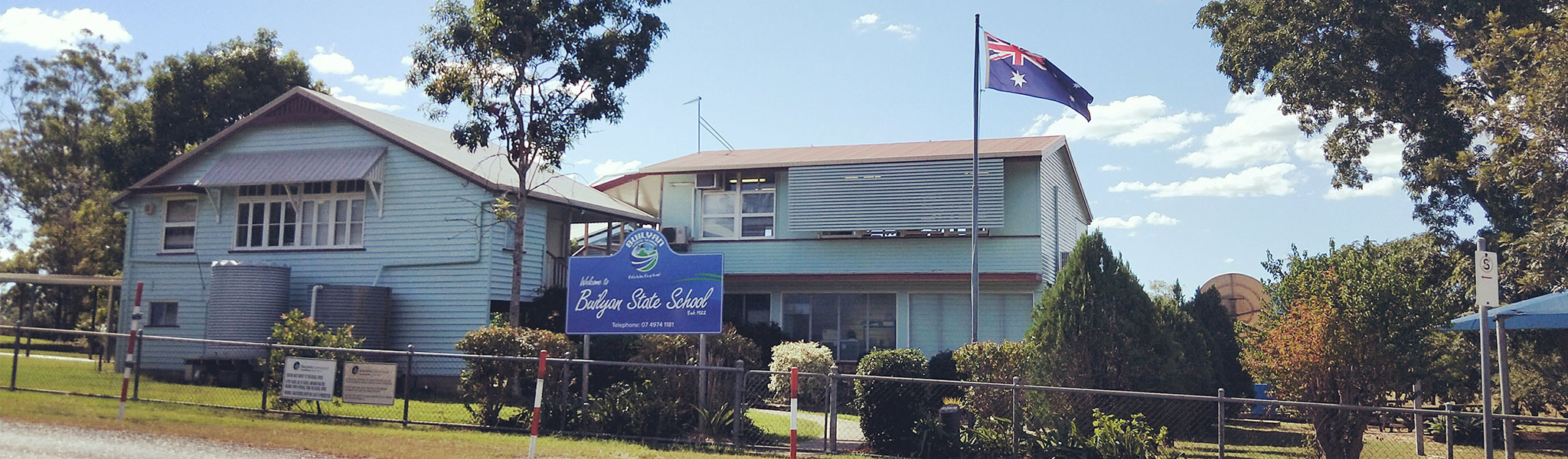

Builyan State School is a government primary (Prep-6) school for boys and girls at Gladstone Road (24.5293°S 151.3854°E). In 2017, the school had an enrolment of 8 students with 2 teachers (1 full-time equivalent) and 4 non-teaching staff (2 full-time equivalent). In 2020 the student enrolment was 7 students. In 2023 the enrolment increased to 10 students.

There are no secondary schools in the Boyne Valley. The nearest is Miriam Vale State School in Miriam Vale to the north-east which offers secondary schooling to Year 10. For Years 11 and 12, the nearest government schools are Gladstone State High School in West Gladstone to the north, Rosedale State School in Rosedale to the east, and Monto State High School in Monto to the south-west.

== Attractions ==
The Dawes Range Tunnel section of the Boyne Burnett Inland Rail Trail was opened on 11 September 2021. The 26.28-kilometre (16.33 mi) section starts at Barrimoon Siding, Kalpowar and finishes at Builyan, Boyne Valley. This section contains 6 tunnels between Barrimoon Siding and Golembil Siding, and they are Local Heritage listed. Tunnel Six is the only place 100 year old rail and hogback sleepers are preserved on any of the disused rail corridors in the state. Hogback sleepers have a round top. They are hand hewn from the hard dense iron bark trees growing adjacent to the track. The trail also passes the historic township of Many Peaks with its Local Heritage listed attractions – the Many Peaks Railway Complex, and Many Peaks Road Bridge. The Rail Trail is currently open as far as the Railway siding at Builyan in the Boyne Valley with Free camp area, fresh water and public amenities.

While not on the rail trail, the Heritage listed Many Peaks Railway Dam is accessed by getting on to the (very low traffic) bitumen road at Many Peaks and riding back less than a kilometre. There is a new shelter shed, history information signage, toilet block and elevated lookout over the old weir. There is no drinking water available.

Climate data for Builyan, Gum Street 1977-2015
| Month | Jan | Feb | Mar | Apr | May | Jun | Jul | Aug | Sep | Oct | Nov | Dec | Year |
|---|---|---|---|---|---|---|---|---|---|---|---|---|---|
| Average precipitation inches (mm) | 4.70 (119.5) | 3.66 (93.0) | 2.75 (69.9) | 1.28 (32.5) | 1.41 (35.7) | 0.99 (25.2) | 0.85 (21.7) | 1.14 (29.0) | 0.65 (16.6) | 1.86 (47.2) | 2.84 (72.1) | 3.80 (96.6) | 34.61 (879.1) |
Source: Bureau of Meteorology

== See also ==
- Kroombit Tops National Park
- Monto
- Gladstone
- Calliope
- Lake Awoonga
- Beautiful Betsy
- Cania Gorge National Park
