= Bulburin National Park =

National park in Australia

- IUCN category II (national park)
- Location within Queensland
- Location: Queensland
- Nearest city: Miriam Vale
- Coordinates: 24°36′S 151°32′E
- Established: 2015
- Governing body: Queensland Parks and Wildlife Service

Bulburin National Park is a national park in Queensland, Australia, 120 km south of Gladstone and 40 km south-west of Miriam Vale.

Here is the largest remnant of the subtropical rainforest in central Queensland. Diversity of wildlife is represented, including wompoo pigeons, regent bowerbirds, red-necked and red-legged pademelons, red-eyed tree frogs and endangered long-nosed potoroo.

== See also ==
- Protected areas of Queensland
