= Moonford =

- Town
- Interactive map of Moonford
- Coordinates: 24.7627°S 151.035°E
- Country: Australia
- State: Queensland
- LGA: North Burnett Region
- Location: 11.7 km (7.3 mi) NW of Monto; 152 km (94 mi) NNW of Gayndah; 171 km (106 mi) SSW of Gladstone; 187 km (116 mi) W of Bundaberg; 486 km (302 mi) NNW of Brisbane

Government
  - State electorate: Callide
  - Federal division: Flynn

Area
  - Total: 220.1 km^{2} (85.0 sq mi)

Population
  - Total: 162 (2021 census)
  - Density: 0.7360/km^{2} (1.906/sq mi)
- Time zone: UTC+10:00 (AEST)
- Postcode: 4630
Localities around Moonford
Cania	Cania	Monal
Coominglah Forest	Moonford	Mungungo
Coominglah Forest	Monto	Monto

Moonford is a rural town and locality in the North Burnett Region, Queensland, Australia. In the 2021 census, the locality of Moonford had a population of 162 people.

== Geography ==
Cania Road, which provides access to Cania Gorge National Park and Cania Dam, runs north from the Burnett Highway through Moonford to Cania.

== History ==
Wongalee State School opened in October 1929, using a relocated open-air school building from Parke State School in Tinana South. Miss Wainwright was the first teacher. The school closed circa 1943. It was on the western side of Cania Road (approx 24.71720°S 151.04697°E). In 1945, the school building was relocated to establish Ventor State School.

In December 1933, tenders were called to erect Moonford State School. It opened on 5 June 1934. It was officially opened on 30 June 1934 by Tommy Williams, the local member of the Queensland Legislative Assembly for Port Curtis. It closed on 10 December 1982. It was at 551 Cania Road (24.7619°S 151.0356°E).

Christ Church Anglican was dedicated by Bishop George Halford on 1 November 1936. It closed circa 1988. It was at 539 Cania Road (24.7632°S 151.0358°E). As at 2021, the church building is still extant, but in private ownership.

== Demographics ==
In the 2016 census, the locality of Moonford had a population of 160 people.

In the 2021 census, the locality of Moonford had a population of 162 people.

== Education ==
There are no schools in Moonford. The nearest government primary and secondary schools are Monto State School and Monto State High School, both in neighbouring Monto to the south-east.

== Amenities ==
Moonford Hall is at 527 Cania Road (24.76424°S 151.03546°E).

The Moonford branch of the Queensland Country Women's Association meets at the CWA Hall at 32059 Burnett Highway (24.8366°S 151.0544°E).
