= Tellebang, Queensland =

Tellebang
- Suburb
- Interactive map of Tellebang
- Coordinates: 25.0316°S 151.2594°E
- Country: Australia
- State: Queensland
- LGA: North Burnett Region
- Location: 31.1 km (19.3 mi) SSE of Monto; 127 km (79 mi) NNW of Gayndah; 190 km (120 mi) S of Gladstone; 209 km (130 mi) W of Bundaberg; 450 km (280 mi) NNW of Brisbane

Government
  - State electorate: Callide
  - Federal division: Flynn

Area
  - Total: 168.4 km^{2} (65.0 sq mi)

Population
  - Total: 60 (2021 census)
  - Density: 0.356/km^{2} (0.92/sq mi)
- Time zone: UTC+10:00 (AEST)
- Postcode: 4630
Suburbs around Tellebang
Mulgildie	Splinter Creek	Ventnor
Selene	Tellebang	Yarrol
Kapaldo	Langley	Yarrol

Tellebang is a rural locality in the North Burnett Region, Queensland, Australia. In the 2021 census, Tellebang had a population of 60 people.

== History ==
Tellebang State School opened on 16 February 1931 and closed on 31 December 1965. It was on a triangular site south of the intersection of the Burnett Highway and Turners Road (25.04234°S 151.23207°E). A sign facing the highway marks the site.

== Demographics ==
In the 2016 census, Tellebang had a population of 63 people.

In the 2021 census, Tellebang had a population of 60 people.

== Education ==
There are no schools in Tellebang. The nearest government primary schools are Mulgildie State School in neighbouring Mulgildie to the north-west and Abercorn State School in Abercorn to the south-west. The nearest government secondary school is Monto State High School in Monto to the north-west.
