= Splinter Creek =

- Suburb
- Interactive map of Splinter Creek
- Coordinates: 24.9455°S 151.2441°E
- Country: Australia
- State: Queensland
- LGA: North Burnett Region
- Location: 20.6 km (12.8 mi) SE of Monto; 110 km (68 mi) NNW of Gayndah; 176 km (109 mi) W of Bundaberg; 461 km (286 mi) NNW of Brisbane

Government
  - State electorate: Callide
  - Federal division: Flynn

Area
  - Total: 66.6 km^{2} (25.7 sq mi)

Population
  - Total: 32 (2021 census)
  - Density: 0.480/km^{2} (1.244/sq mi)
- Time zone: UTC+10:00 (AEST)
- Postcode: 4630
Suburbs around Splinter Creek
Cannindah	Ventnor	Ventnor
Three Moon	Splinter Creek	Ventnor
Mulgildie	Tellebang	Tellebang

Splinter Creek is a rural locality in the North Burnett Region, Queensland, Australia. In the 2021 census, Splinter Creek had a population of 32 people.

== Geography ==
Splinter Creek has the following mountains:

- Mount Cannindah in the north-west of the locality (24.9270°S 151.2198°E), rising to 363 metres (1,191 ft) above sea level
- Mount Tellebang in the south of the locality (24.9834°S 151.2377°E) 433 metres (1,421 ft)

The watercourse Splinter Creek from which the locality presumably takes its name enters the locality from the north (Cannindah / Ventnor) and forms the locality's north-western boundary before flowing south through the locality, then forming part of the south-western boundary, then flowing through the locality to the south, where it forms part of the southern boundary of the locality before exiting to the south-east (Tellebang).

The land use is predominantly grazing on native vegetation with some crop growing.

== History ==
Splinter Creek Bridge State School opened on 3 April 1934 and closed in October 1958. It was on the south-west corner of Mountain View Road and Normans Road (24.95695°S 151.22862°E).

== Demographics ==
In the 2016 census, Splinter Creek had a population of 31 people.

In the 2021 census, Splinter Creek had a population of 32 people.

== Education ==
There are no schools in Splinter Creek. The nearest government primary school is Mulgildie State School in neighbouring Mulgildie to the south-west. The nearest government secondary school is Monto State High School in Monto the north-west.

There is also a Catholic primary school in Monto.
