= Ventnor, Queensland =

Ventnor
- Suburb
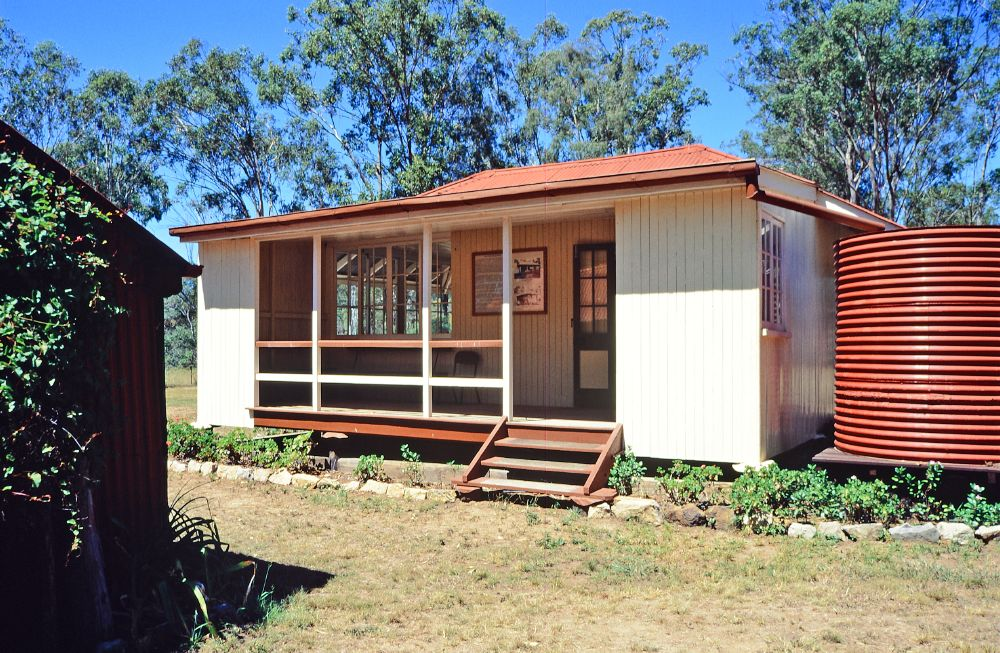
- Former Ventnor State School, 2002

- Interactive map of Ventnor
- Coordinates: 24.8983°S 151.3080°E
- Country: Australia
- State: Queensland
- LGA: North Burnett Region
- Location: 33.6 km (20.9 mi) E of Monto; 110 km (68 mi) N of Gayndah; 151 km (94 mi) S of Gladstone; 496 km (308 mi) NNW of Brisbane

Government
  - State electorate: Callide
  - Federal division: Flynn

Area
  - Total: 94.6 km^{2} (36.5 sq mi)

Population
  - Total: 13 (2021 census)
  - Density: 0.137/km^{2} (0.356/sq mi)
- Time zone: UTC+10:00 (AEST)
- Postcode: 4630
Suburbs around Ventnor
Cannindah	Bancroft	Yarrol
Cannindah	Ventnor	Yarrol
Splinter Creek	Tellebang	Yarrol

Ventnor is a rural locality in the North Burnett Region, Queensland, Australia. In the 2021 census, Ventnor had a population of 13 people.

== Geography ==
The terrain varies from 240 to 510 metres (790 to 1,670 ft) above sea level. There are no named peaks.

Cannindah State Forest is in the south of the locality. Apart from this protected area, the land use is predominantly grazing on native vegetation with some plantation forestry.

== History ==
Yarrol Road State School opened on 3 June 1946. In 1948, it became Ventnor State School. It closed in 1960. It was at 1877 Yarrol Road (24.91078°S 151.28643°E). In 1963, local residents made an offer of £150 to purchase the school from the Department of Education and the property was transferred to the Ventnor Progress Association on 15 March 1963. Since that time, the school complex has been used as headquarters for the progress association, for religious group services, farming and pastoral bodies and fire control groups and was regularly used as a polling booth. The Ventnor Progress Association continues to own and maintain the premises.

== Demographics ==
In the 2016 census, Ventnor had a population of 14 people.

In the 2021 census, Ventnor had a population of 13 people.

== Heritage listings ==
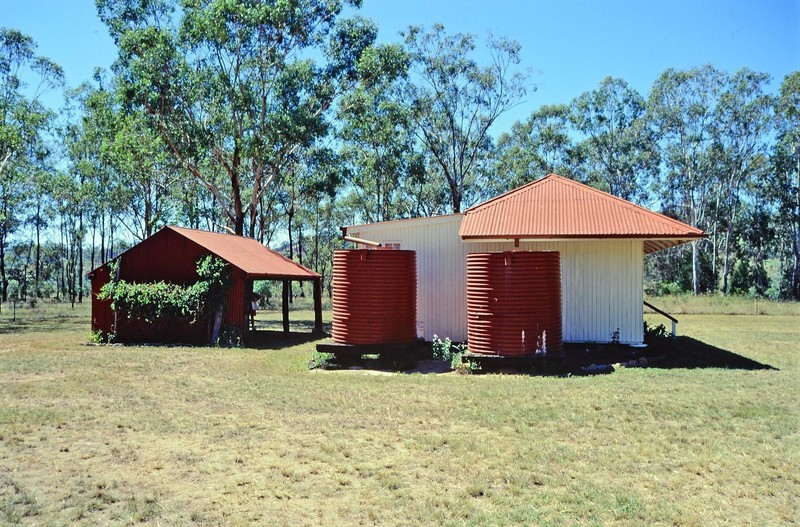
Two buildings, Ventnor State School (former), 2002

Ventnor has a number of heritage-listed sites, including:

- Ventnor State School: 1877 Yarrol Road

== Education ==
There are no schools in Ventnor. The nearest government primary schools are Mulgildie State School in Mulgildie to the south-west and Monto State School in Monto to the north-west. The nearest government secondary school is Monto State High School, also in Monto.
