= Cania, Queensland =

Cania
- Suburb
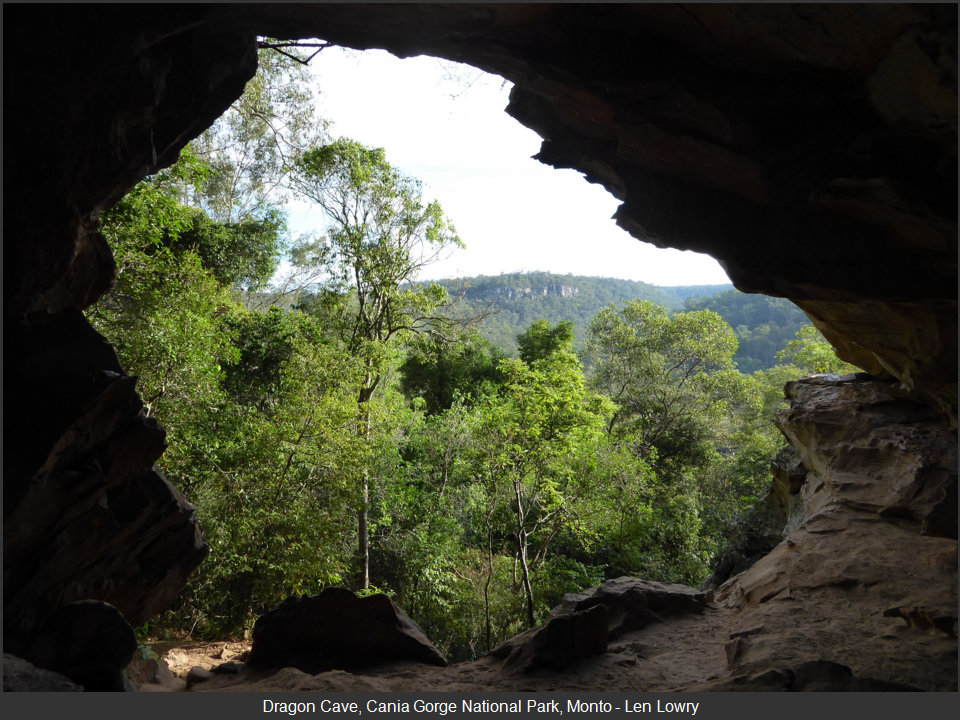
- Dragon Cave, Cania Gorge National Park

- Interactive map of Cania
- Coordinates: 24.5816°S 150.9941°E
- Country: Australia
- State: Queensland
- LGA: North Burnett Region
- Location: 32.3 km (20.1 mi) NNE of Monto; 156 km (97 mi) NNW of Gayndah; 192 km (119 mi) SW of Gladstone; 520 km (320 mi) NW of Brisbane

Government
  - State electorate: Callide
  - Federal division: Flynn

Area
  - Total: 471.1 km^{2} (181.9 sq mi)

Population
  - Total: 27 (2021 census)
  - Density: 0.0573/km^{2} (0.1484/sq mi)
- Time zone: UTC+10:00 (AEST)
- Postcode: 4630
Suburbs around Cania
Valentine Plains	Tablelands	Boyne Valley
Lawgi Dawes	Cania	Monal
Coominglah	Coominglah Forest	Moonford

Cania is a locality in the North Burnett Region, Queensland, Australia. In the 2021 census, Cania had a population of 27 people.

== Geography ==
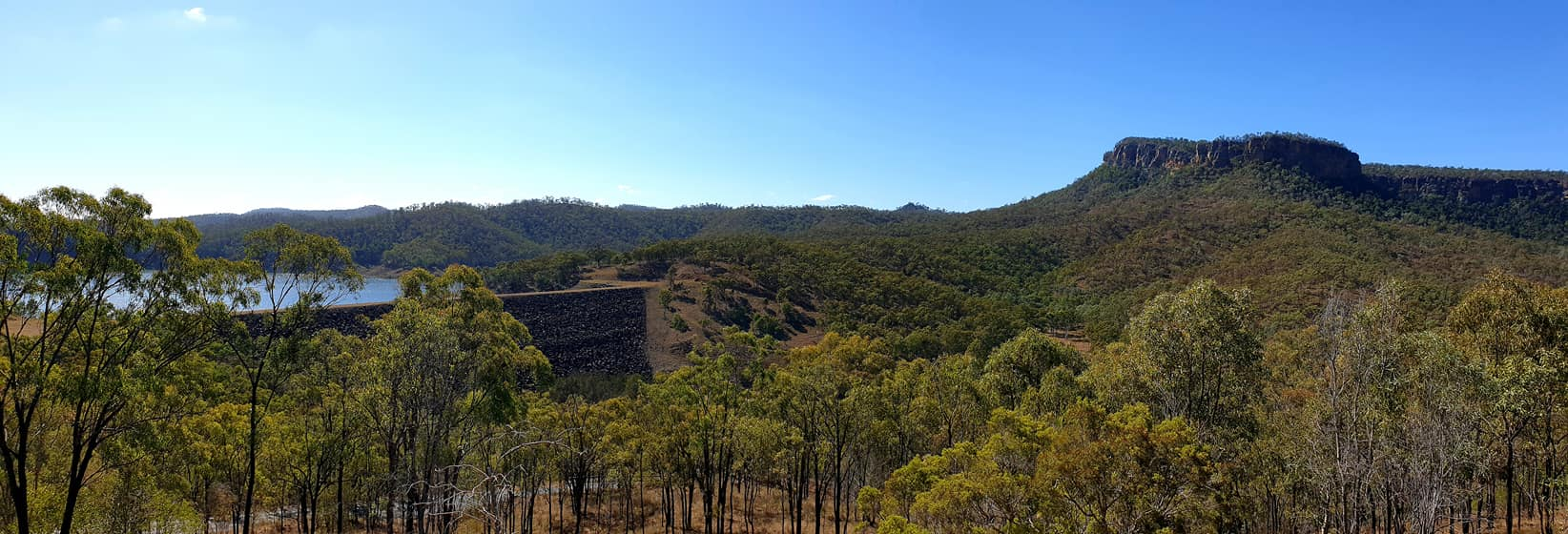
Cania Dam, 2021

Three Moon Creek rises in the north of the locality (24.39831°S 151.04558°E) and flows south through the locality into Lake Cania, created by the Cania Dam in the south of the locality (24.65004°S 150.98592°E).

There are a number of protected areas in Cania:

- Cania Gorge National Park in the south of the locality
- part of Kroombit Tops National Park in the north of the locality
- part of Grevillea State Forest in the west of the locality

== History ==
Thomas Archer was the first European to explore the headwaters of the Burnett River in the 1840s.

Cania pastoral station was established in the 1850s raising sheep until 1883, after which beef and dairy cattle were added.

Gold was discovered in the Cania Gorge in 1870. The gold mining town of Cania was established near Three Moon Creek and gold mining continued there until the early 1920s.

Cania Provisional School opened in 1890. It became Cania State School on 1 January 1909. Due to low attendance numbers, it closed in 1930.

The construction of the Cania Dam across Three Moon Creek in 1982 flooded the former town of Cania. However, headstones from the town's cemetery were relocated to the dam lookout. At low water levels, the tops of some of the town's buildings become visible, which last occurred in 2010.

== Demographics ==
In the 2016 census, Cania had a population of 28 people.

In the 2021 census, Cania had a population of 27 people.

== Education ==
There are no schools in Cania. The nearest government primary school is Monto State School in Monto to the south-east. The nearest government secondary school is Monto State High School, also in Monto. However, some parts of Cania are too far from Monto for a daily commute, so distance education and boarding school are other alternatives.

== Amenities ==
There is boat ramp into the Cania Dam (24.6477°S 150.9820°E). It is managed by the North Burnett Regional Council.

== Attractions ==
There are numerous lookouts in Cania:

- Castle Mountain Lookout (24.6535°S 150.9973°E)
- Giants Chair Lookout (24.7220°S 150.9842°E)
- Big Foot Lookout (24.7236°S 150.9926°E)
- Bloodwood Cave Lookout (24.7180°S 150.9941°E)
- Gorge Lookout (24.7167°S 150.9932°E)
- Dragon Cave Lookout (24.7161°S 150.9928°E)
- The Lookout (24.7109°S 150.9944°E)
- Dripping Rock Lookout (24.7107°S 150.9946°E)
- The Overhang Lookout (24.7077°S 150.9966°E)
- Cania Dam Lookout (24.65270°S 150.98280°E)
