= Bancroft, Queensland =

Bancroft
- Suburb
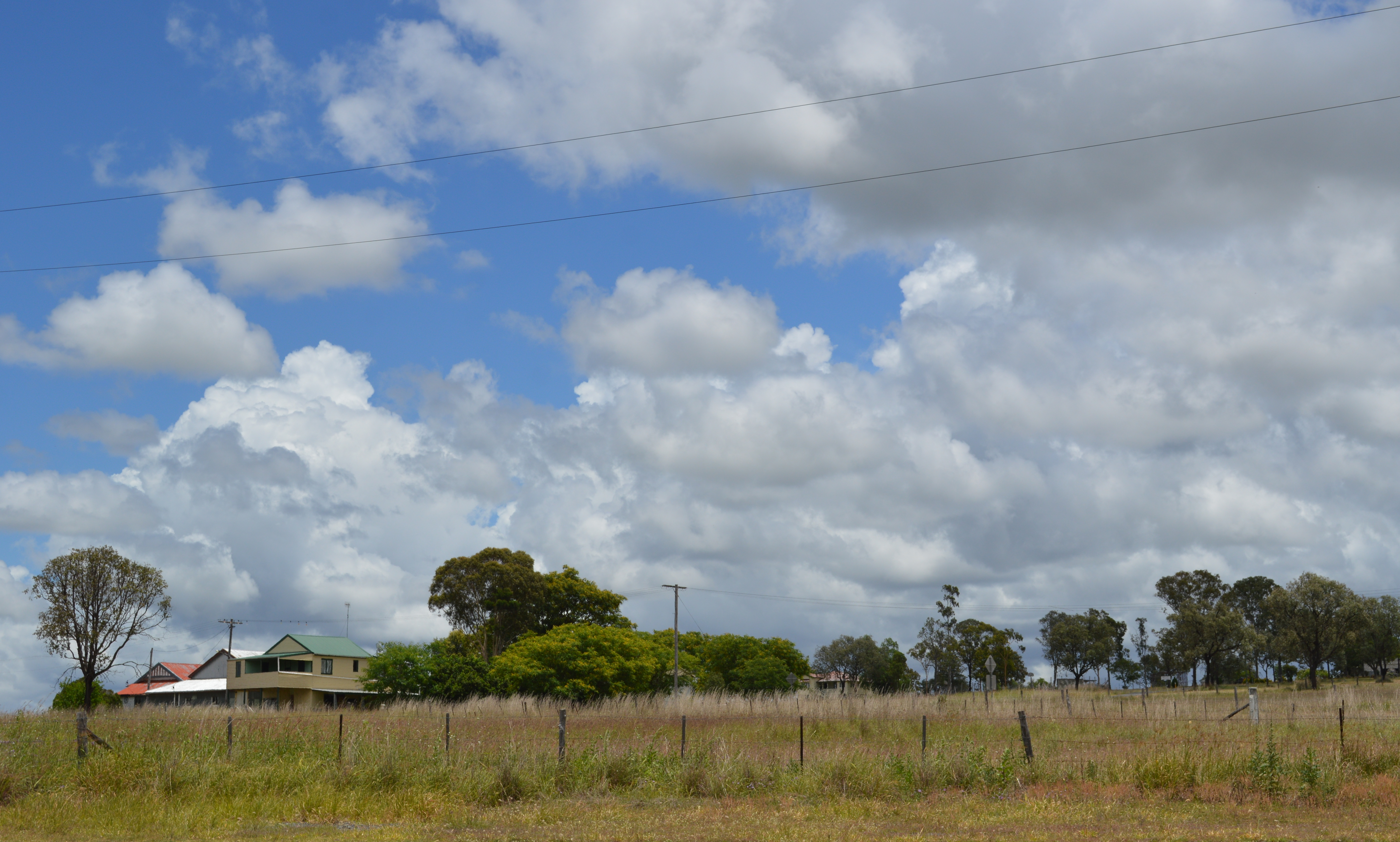
- The village seen from the railway line, 2017

- Interactive map of Bancroft
- Coordinates: 24.7941°S 151.2886°E
- Country: Australia
- State: Queensland
- LGA: North Burnett Region
- Location: 21.2 km (13.2 mi) NE of Monto; 154 km (96 mi) W of Bundaberg; 165 km (103 mi) N of Gayndah; 488 km (303 mi) NNW of Brisbane

Government
  - State electorate: Callide
  - Federal division: Flynn

Area
  - Total: 215.5 km^{2} (83.2 sq mi)

Population
  - Total: 98 (2021 census)
  - Density: 0.4548/km^{2} (1.178/sq mi)
- Time zone: UTC+10:00 (AEST)
- Postcode: 4630
Suburbs around Bancroft
Monal	Kalpowar	Kalpowar
Mungungo	Bancroft	Yarrol
Bukali	Cannindah	Ventnor

Bancroft is a rural locality in the North Burnett Region, Queensland, Australia. In the 2021 census, Bancroft had a population of 98 people.

== Geography ==
There are two neighbourhoods in Bancroft:

- Birnam in the north-west of the locality (24.7166°S 151.2166°E)
- Dakiel in the north of the locality (24.75°S 151.2666°E)

== History ==
Many Peaks Provisional School opened on 23 Oct 1922 as part of the railway construction camp (57 Mile Camp) for the Gladstone to Monto railway line. In 1923 it was relocated south to the 63 Mile Camp. In 1926 it moved south to 67 Mile Camp and was renamed Barrimoon Provisional School (Barrimoon being the name of the railway station there). In 1927 it moved again to 74 Mile Camp and its name was changed in 1928 to Kalpowar Provisional School. In 1929 it moved to 82 Mile Camp and in September 1930 it was renamed Bancroft Provisional School. On 1 August 1931 it became Bancroft State School and remained there permanently until its closure on 31 December 1998. The school was located at 39 Bancroft School Road (24.7856°S 151.2292°E).

There were two railway stations on the now-closed railway line within the locality:

- Dakiel railway station in the north of the locality (24.7420°S 151.2600°E)
- Bancroft railway station in the west of the locality at the town (24.7869°S 151.2318°E)

The name Dakiel comes from the former Dakiel railway station, which was named by the Queensland Railways Department 28 August 1928, using the name of a local property, being an Aboriginal word meaning ducks.

In 1929, it was decided to name the district Bancroft in honour Thomas Lane Bancroft (1860–1933), a doctor and scientist who lived in the area from 1910 to 1930. Prior to this, the Bancroft railway station had been named Awring by the Queensland Railways Department, but this name was not liked by the local residents.

== Demographics ==
In the 2016 census, Bancroft had a population of 96 people.

In the 2021 census, Bancroft had a population of 98 people.

== Education ==
There are no schools in Bancroft. The nearest government primary school is Monto State School in Monto to the south-west. The nearest government secondary school is Monto State High School, also in Monto.

== Amenities ==
The Monto-Bancroft branch of the Queensland Country Women's Association meets at 9 Rutherford Street, Monto.
