= Cannindah, Queensland =

Cannindah
- Suburb
- Interactive map of Cannindah
- Coordinates: 24.8747°S 151.2136°E
- Country: Australia
- State: Queensland
- LGA: North Burnett Region
- Location: 15.5 km (9.6 mi) E of Mono; 120 km (75 mi) NNW of Gayndah; 163 km (101 mi) W of Bundaberg; 484 km (301 mi) NNW of Brisbane

Government
  - State electorate: Callide
  - Federal division: Flynn

Area
  - Total: 70.3 km^{2} (27.1 sq mi)

Population
  - Total: 35 (2021 census)
  - Density: 0.498/km^{2} (1.289/sq mi)
- Time zone: UTC+10:00 (AEST)
- Postcode: 4630
Suburbs around Cannindah
Bukali	Bancroft	Bancroft
Monto	Cannindah	Ventnor
Three Moon	Splinter Creek	Ventnor

Cannindah is a rural locality in the North Burnett Region, Queensland, Australia. In the 2021 census, Cannindah had a population of 35 people.

== Prehistory ==
In the Mississippian era (358-323 mya) also known as the Early Carboniferous period, the area was part of a shallow sea where coral formed a coral reef that became carbonate rock (limestone) underlying the area. Cannindah Reef was the largest-known reef from this period.

== History ==
The locality's name is taken from the name of a pastoral run held in 1853 by Hugh Mackay which is shown on an 1872 map of Southern Queensland and again on an 1878 map of the district.

Mount Cannindah State School opened in 1918 and closed circa 1920.

New Cannindah Provisional School opened in 1926 and closed circa 1933. It reopened circa 1949 but closed in 1958.

Cannindah State School opened on 9 November 1932 and closed in 1958. It was at 1070 Cannindah Road (24.90723°S 151.22093°E).

== Demographics ==
In the 2016 census, Cannindah had a population of 32 people.

In the 2021 census, Cannindah had a population of 35 people.

== Education ==
There are no schools in Cannindah. The nearest government primary schools are Monto State School in neighbouring Monto to the west and Mulgildie State School in Mulgildie to the south-west. The nearest government secondary school is Monto State High School, also in Monto.
