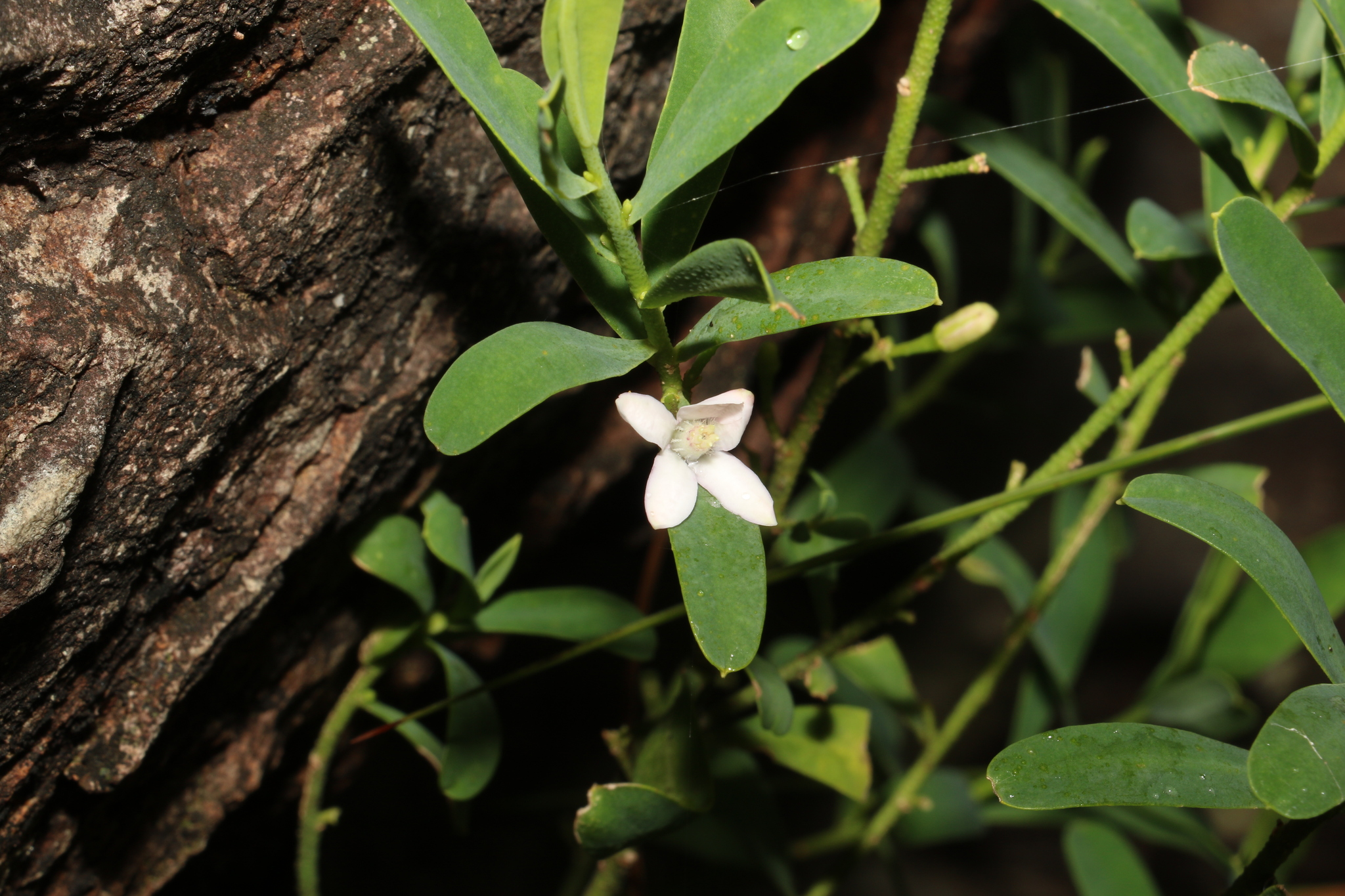

Scientific classification
- Kingdom: Plantae
- Clade: Tracheophytes
- Clade: Angiosperms
- Clade: Eudicots
- Clade: Rosids
- Order: Sapindales
- Family: Rutaceae
- Genus: Philotheca
- Species: P. glasshousiensis

Binomial name
- Philotheca glasshousiensis (Domin) P.I.Forst.

Synonyms
- Eriostemon glasshousiensis Domin; Eriostemon myoporoides subsp. leichhardtii (Benth.) Paul G.Wilson; Eriostemon trachyphyllus var. leichhardtii Benth.; Philotheca myoporoides subsp. leichhardtii (Benth.) Bayly

= Philotheca glasshousiensis =

Species of plant

Philotheca glasshousiensis is a species of flowering plant in the family Rutaceae and is endemic to Queensland. It is a shrub with densely glandular-warty branchlets, lance-shaped to wedge-shaped leaves clustered near the ends of the branchlets and cream-coloured flowers arranged singly or in groups of up to five.

== Description ==
Philotheca glasshousiensis is a shrub that grows to a height of about 1 m (3 ft 3 in) and has smooth branchlets. The leaves are more or less clustered near the ends of the branchlets and are lance-shaped to wedge-shaped with the narrower end towards the base, 20–52 mm (0.79–2.05 in) long and 5–11 mm (0.20–0.43 in) wide. The flowers are borne singly or in groups of up to five on a peduncle up to 5 mm (0.20 in) long, each flower on a pedicel 4–12 mm (0.16–0.47 in) long. There are five roughly circular sepals and five elliptical to oblong cream-coloured petals 6–8.5 mm (0.24–0.33 in) long and 2.5–3 mm (0.098–0.118 in) wide. The ten stamens are densely hairy. Flowering occurs from February to April and the fruit is 7–11 mm (0.28–0.43 in) long and prominently beaked.

== Taxonomy and naming ==
This species was first formally described in 1926 by Karel Domin who gave it the name Eriostemon glasshousiensis and published the description in the journal Bibliotheca Botanica, from specimens collected by Cyril Tenison White in the Glasshouse Mountains in 1909. In 2005 Paul Irwin Forster changed the name to Philotheca glasshousiensis in the journal Austrobaileya.

== Distribution and habitat ==
Philotheca glasshousiensis grows on rocky outcrops near the summit of the Glass House Mountains and north to Mt Cooroora, Cania Gorge National Park and Kroombit Tops National Park in south-eastern Queensland.

== Conservation status ==
This philotheca is classified as of "least concern" under the Queensland Government Nature Conservation Act 1992.
