= Selene, Queensland =

Selene
- Suburb
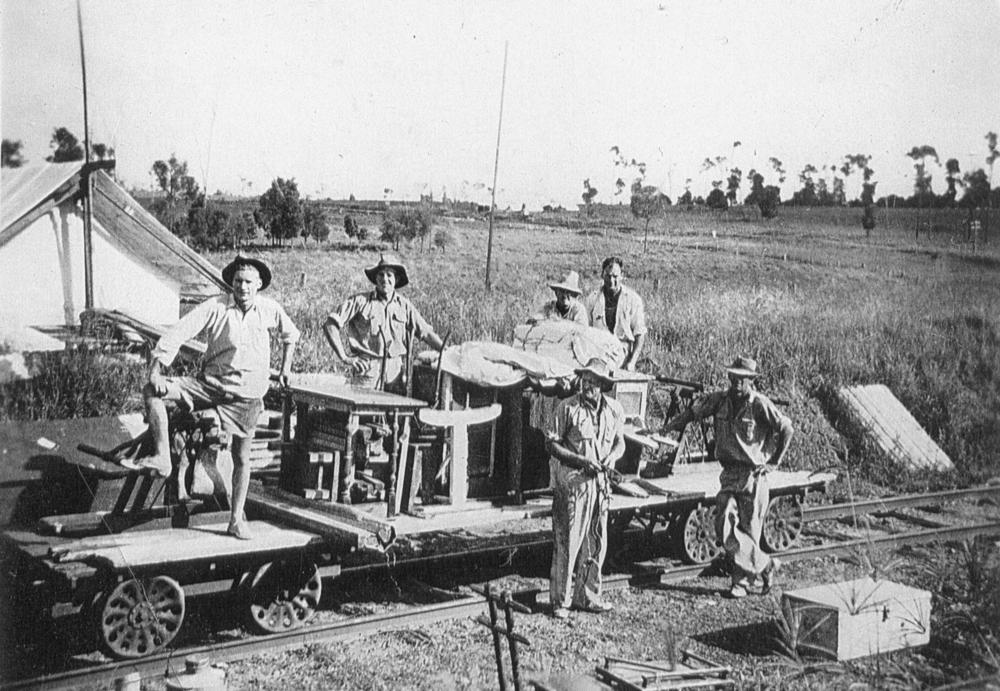
- Railway workers at their camp in the Selene district, 1949

- Interactive map of Selene
- Coordinates: 25.0066°S 151.14°E
- Country: Australia
- State: Queensland
- LGA: North Burnett Region
- Location: 17.4 km (10.8 mi) S of Montol; 114 km (71 mi) NNW of Gayndah; 177 km (110 mi) S of Gladstone CBD; 185 km (115 mi) W of Bundaberg; 472 km (293 mi) NW of Brisbane

Government
  - State electorate: Callide
  - Federal division: Flynn

Area
  - Total: 33.2 km^{2} (12.8 sq mi)

Population
  - Total: 27 (2021 census)
  - Density: 0.813/km^{2} (2.11/sq mi)
- Time zone: UTC+10:00 (AEST)
- Postcode: 4630
Suburbs around Selene
Coominglah Forest	Mulgildie	Tellebang
Glenleigh	Selene	Tellebang
Glenleigh	Kapaldo	Tellebang

Selene is a rural locality in the North Burnett Region, Queensland, Australia. In the 2021 census, Selene had a population of 27 people.

== Geography ==
Abercorn Road enters the locality from the north-west (Mulgildie) and exits to the south-west (Glenleigh).

Tuturi is a neighbourhood in the north of the locality (25.0000°S 151.1333°E) near the former railway station of the same name. The name Tuturi was assigned by the Queensland Railways Department and is word from the Waka language, meaning grey box tree.

The land use is a mixture of grazing on native vegetation and crop growing.

== History ==
Originally proposed as Mulgeldie State School, Selene State School opened on 25 January 1926 under teacher Miss Hall. In June 1938, the school was relocated to new 2-acre (0.81 ha) site at 261 Selene Hall Road (25.0086°S 151.1655°E). It closed on 25 July 1965.

The now-closed Mungar Junction to Monto railway line opened to Selene in 1927. The locality was served by two now-abandoned stations:

- Tuturi railway station (24.9997°S 151.1480°E)
- Selene railway station (25.0078°S 151.1464°E)

Selene Baptist Church was officially opened by Reverend Benjamin Hewison (President of the Queensland Baptist Union) on Saturday 13 May 1933. It was on Kalpaldo Road (opposite junction with Selene Hall Road, 25.0059°S 151.1390°E). In 1962, it was relocated to Monto be used as a hall for the Monto Baptist Church.

The last train on the railway line was in 2008 and in 2012 it was announced the line was officially closed.

Selene Public Hall was on Selene Hall Road. Having been unused for about ten years, it was relocated in February 2017 to the Monto Historical Centre at 20 Flinders Street, Monto, for use as an archive for the photographs of the Monto Historical Society.

== Demographics ==
In the 2016 census, Selene had a population of 25 people.

In the 2021 census, Selene had a population of 27 people.

== Education ==
There are no schools in Selene. The nearest government primary school is Mulgildie State School in neighbouring Mulgildie to the north. The nearest government secondary school is Monto State High School in Monto to the north. There is also a Catholic primary school in Monto.
