= Mungungo =

- Town
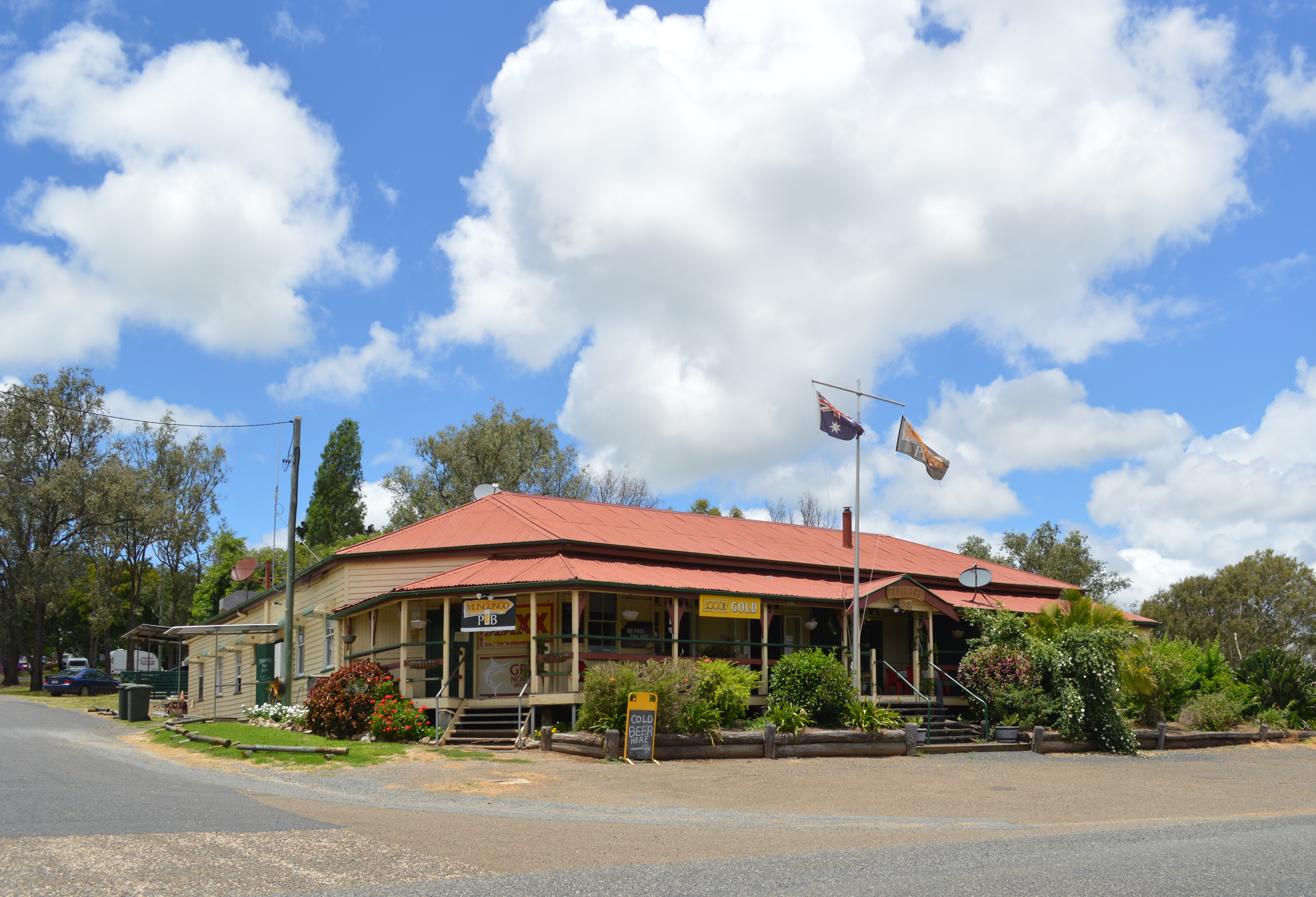
- Waratah Hotel at Mungungo, 2017

- Interactive map of Mungungo
- Coordinates: 24.7672°S 151.1638°E
- Country: Australia
- State: Queensland
- LGA: North Burnett Region
- Location: 13.8 km (8.6 mi) NNE of Monto; 137 km (85 mi) NNW of Gayndah; 161 km (100 mi) W of Bundaberg; 489 km (304 mi) NNW of Brisbane

Government
  - State electorate: Callide
  - Federal division: Flynn

Area
  - Total: 102.4 km^{2} (39.5 sq mi)

Population
  - Total: 84 (2021 census)
  - Density: 0.820/km^{2} (2.125/sq mi)
- Time zone: UTC+10:00 (AEST)
- Postcode: 4630
Localities around Mungungo
Moonford	Monal	Monal
Moonford	Mungungo	Bancroft
Moonford	Monto	Bukali

Mungungo is a rural town and locality in the North Burnett Region, Queensland, Australia. In the 2021 census, the locality of Mungungo had a population of 84 people.

== Geography ==
Mungungo is in the Wide Bay-Burnett region, 488 kilometres (303 mi) north west of the state capital, Brisbane.

== History ==
The name Mungungo is believed to mean "darkness" or "night" in an unidentified Aboriginal language. Until 1929, the town was known as Waratah.

Clonmel State School opened on 12 April 1926 and closed in 1967. It was on the eastern side of Monal Road (24.74059°S 151.16890°E).

The Mungungo Hall (also known as School of Arts) was officially opened with a dance on Saturday 13 July 1929. celebrated its 90th birthday in 2019.

The now-abandoned Gladstone to Monto railway line reached Mungungo in 1930 with two now-abandoned stations in the locality:

- Crana railway station (24.7607°S 151.1873°E)
- Mungungo railway station (24.7672°S 151.1624°E)

== Demographics ==
In the 2016 census, the locality of Mungungo had a population of 77 people.

In the 2021 census, the locality of Mungungo had a population of 84 people.

== Education ==
There are no schools in Mungungo. The nearest government primary and secondary schools are Monto State School and Monto State High School, both in neighbouring Monto to the south.

== Amenities ==
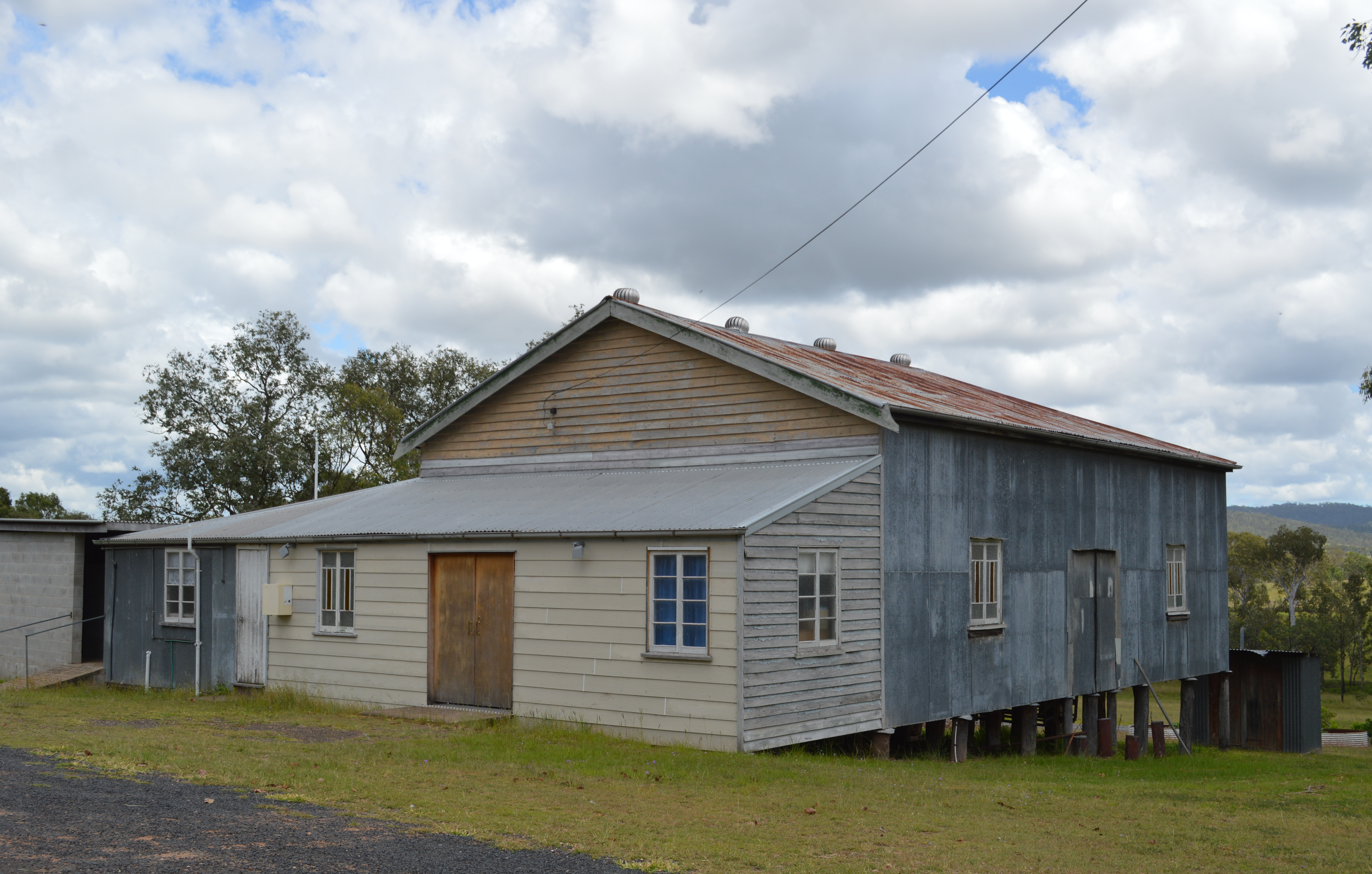
Mungungo Public Hall, 2017

Mungungo is well known for its pub which is one of the few available eateries in the area.

Mungungo Public Hall is at 14 Harris Street (24.7680°S 151.1634°E).

== Attractions ==
The Bicentennial National Trail passes through Mungungo.
