= Three Moon =

- Suburb
- Interactive map of Three Moon
- Coordinates: 24.9149°S 151.1302°E
- Country: Australia
- State: Queensland
- LGA: North Burnett Region
- Location: 6.4 km (4.0 mi) S of Monto; 145 km (90 mi) NNW of Gayndah; 166 km (103 mi) S of Gladstone; 468 km (291 mi) NW of Brisbane

Government
  - State electorate: Callide
  - Federal division: Flynn

Area
  - Total: 92.9 km^{2} (35.9 sq mi)

Population
  - Total: 178 (2021 census)
  - Density: 1.916/km^{2} (4.963/sq mi)
- Time zone: UTC+10:00 (AEST)
- Postcode: 4630
Suburbs around Three Moon
Monto	Monto	Cannindah
Coominglah Forest	Three Moon	Splinter Creek
Mulgildie	Mulgildie	Mulgildie

Three Moon is a rural locality in the North Burnett Region, Queensland, Australia. In the 2021 census, Three Moon had a population of 178 people.

== History ==
Three Moon State School opened on 24 January 1927 and closed on 22 August 1948. It was to the east of the Three Moon railway station (approx 24.91244°N 151.12945°E).

The final stage of the Mungar Junction to Monto railway line from Mulgildie via Three Moon to Monto opened on 15 September 1928. The last train on the railway line was in 2008 and in 2012 it was announced the line was officially closed. The locality was served by the now-abandoned Three Moon railway station (24.9151°S 151.1291°E).

== Demographics ==
In the 2016 census, Three Moon had a population of 147 people.

In the 2021 census, Three Moon had a population of 178 people.

== Education ==
There are no schools in Three Moon. The nearest government primary schools are Monto State School in neighbouring Monto to the north and Mulgildie State School in neighbouring Mulgildie to the south. The nearest government secondary school is Monto State High School, also in Monto.

== Facilities ==
Despite the name, Monto Aerodrome (IATA: MNQ, ICAO: YMTO) is at 375 Airport Road in Three Moon (24.8922°S 151.1015°E). It has a 1,311-metre (4,301 ft) bitumen-sealed runway. It is operated by the North Burnett Regional Council.
