= Cania Gorge National Park =

National park in Australia

- IUCN category II (national park)
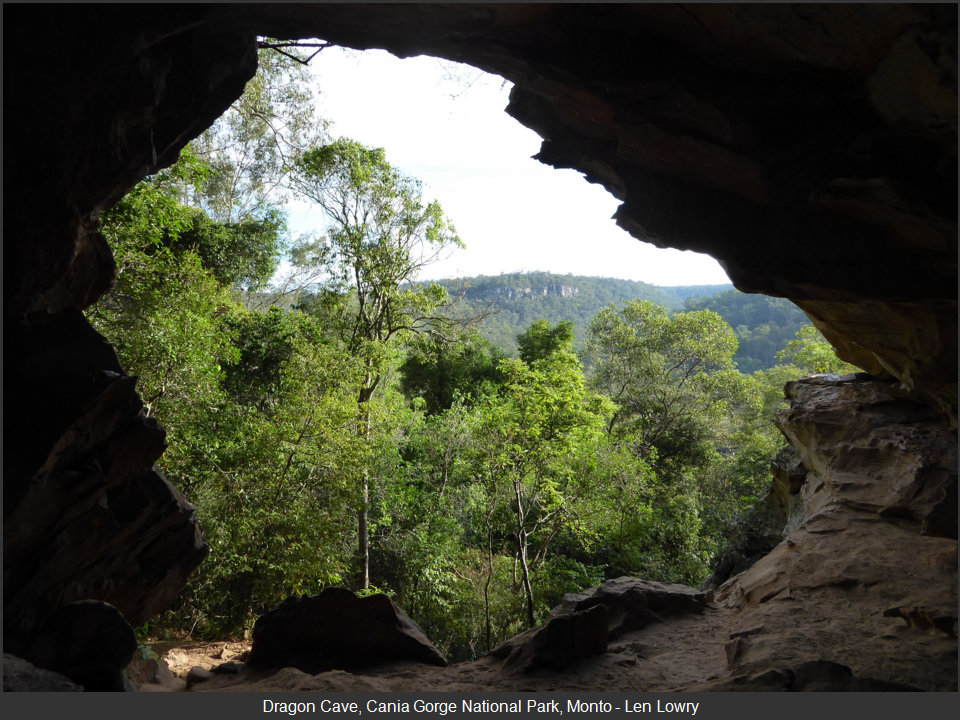
- Dragon Cave, Cania Gorge National Park

- Location within Queensland
- Location: Queensland
- Coordinates: 24°39′36″S 150°59′22″E
- Area: 30 km^{2} (12 sq mi)
- Established: 1977
- Governing body: Queensland Parks and Wildlife Service
- Website: http://www.nprsr.qld.gov.au/parks/cania-gorge

Cania Gorge is a national park in the North Burnett Region, Queensland, Australia, in the locality of Cania.

== Geography ==
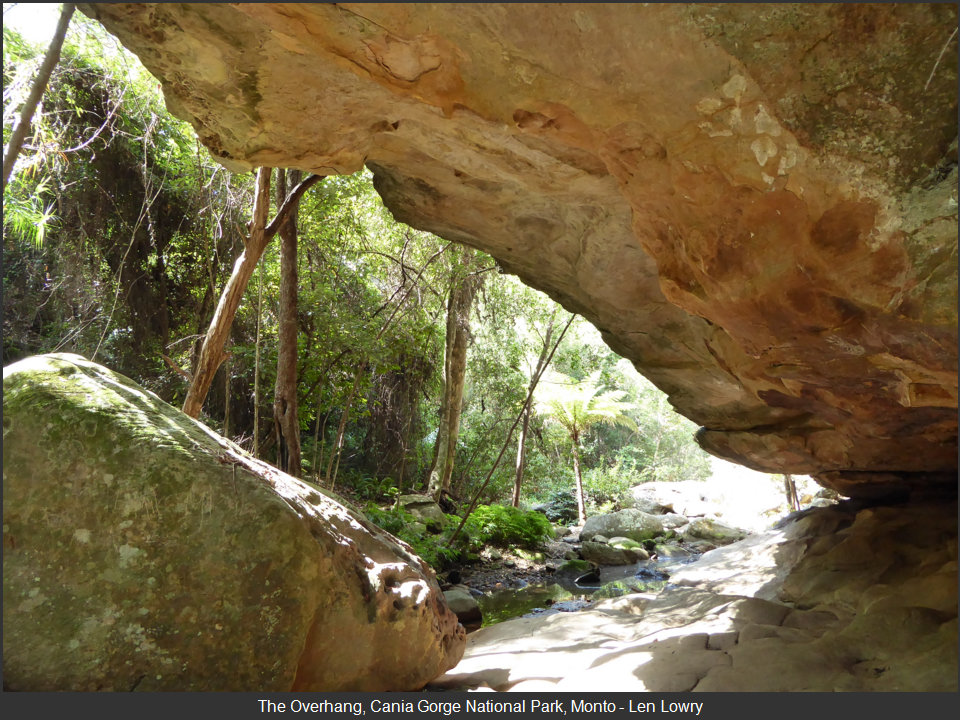
The Overhang

The park is 373 km northwest of Brisbane. The nearest town is Monto. Three Moon Creek is the name of the waterway that runs along the length of the gorge.

The park's most dominant features are the 70 m sandstone cliffs. Wildlife native to the park include rock wallabies, bettong, platypus, geckos and over 90 bird species. The flora is diverse, with more than 150 species found in the region, including cypress pine woodland, eucalypt woodland, brigalow forest, dry rainforest and grassland.

Aboriginal rock art on the cliff walls is an indication of indigenous settlement of at least 19,000 years.

A picnic area is located alongside the main road into the park, 8 km from the Burnett Highway. Facilities here include covered picnic tables, toilets and gas-powered barbecues. The majority of the park's walking tracks lead from this picnic area, including the 1.1 km trail to Dripping Rock, 1.6 km trail to The Overhang, and the 1.3 km trail to Bloodwood Cave. The longest track in the park leads from a small car park 500 metres south of the picnic area. This 5.6 km circuit takes in Giants Chair Lookout, with views across the gorge; and Fern Tree Pool, a permanent waterhole. Only walkers with moderate levels of fitness should attempt this track. Another walk leads visitors to a former mine site.

== See also ==
- Cania Dam
- Protected areas of Queensland
- Boyne Valley, Queensland
