= Coominglah Forest, Queensland =

Coominglah Forest
- Suburb
- Interactive map of Coominglah Forest
- Coordinates: 24.8983°S 150.9705°E
- Country: Australia
- State: Queensland
- LGA: North Burnett Region
- Location: 40.2 km (25.0 mi) W of Monto; 148 km (92 mi) NNW of Gayndah; 219 km (136 mi) W of Bundaberg; 490 km (300 mi) NNW of Brisbane

Government
  - State electorate: Callide
  - Federal division: Flynn

Area
  - Total: 418.3 km^{2} (161.5 sq mi)

Population
  - Total: 0 (2021 census)
  - Density: 0.0000/km^{2} (0.0000/sq mi)
- Time zone: UTC+10:00 (AEST)
- Postcode: 4630
Suburbs around Coominglah Forest
Coominglah	Cania	Moonford
Rawbelle	Coominglah Forest	Monto; Three Moon
Rawbelle	Wuruma Dam; Glenleigh	Mulgildie; Selene

Coominglah Forest is a rural locality in the North Burnett Region, Queensland, Australia. In the 2021 census, Coominglah Forest had "no people or a very low population".

== Geography ==
Coominglah Range (24.7166°S 150.9333°E) is in the north of the locality.

The Burnett Highway passes through the locality from the north-east (Moonford) to the north-west (Coominglah).

Most of the locality is within the Coominglah State Forest, except for one small valley in the east of the locality (24.8581°S 151.0809°E) where the land use is grazing on native vegetation.

Coominglah State Forest has Queensland's largest patch of semi-evergreen vine thicket.

== Demographics ==
In the 2016 census, Coominglah Forest had "no people or a very low population".

In the 2021 census, Coominglah Forest had "no people or a very low population".

== Education ==
There are no schools in Coominglah Forest. The nearest government primary schools are Monto State School in neighbouring Monto to the east and Mulgildie State School in neighbouring Mulgildie to the south-east. The nearest government secondary school is Monto State High School, also in Monto. There is also a Catholic primary school in Monto.

== Attractions ==
There are a number of lookouts in Coominglah Forest:

- Tuckers Lookout (24.8749°S 150.9229°E)
- Hurdle Gully Lookout, off Davies Road (24.8849°S 150.9806°E)
- another lookout (24.8833°S 150.9864°E)
