= Bukali, Queensland =

Bukali
- Suburb
- Interactive map of Bukali
- Coordinates: 24.8191°S 151.1705°E
- Country: Australia
- State: Queensland
- LGA: North Burnett Region
- Location: 7.0 km (4.3 mi) NNE of Monto; 131 km (81 mi) NNW of Gayndah; 155 km (96 mi) S of Gladstone; 170 km (110 mi) W of Bundaberg; 495 km (308 mi) NNW of Brisbane

Government
  - State electorate: Callide
  - Federal division: Flynn

Area
  - Total: 46.8 km^{2} (18.1 sq mi)

Population
  - Total: 57 (2021 census)
  - Density: 1.218/km^{2} (3.154/sq mi)
- Time zone: UTC+10:00 (AEST)
- Postcode: 4630
Suburbs around Bukali
Mungungo	Mungungo	Bancroft
Monto	Bukali	Bancroft
Monto	Cannindah	Cannindah

Bukali is a rural locality in the North Burnett Region, Queensland, Australia. In the 2021 census, Bukali had a population of 57 people.

== Geography ==
The Gladstone - Monto Road enters the locality from the north (Mungungo) and exits to the west (Monto).

Monal Creek also enters the locality from the north and exits to the west, flowing parallel and west of the main road.

The land use is predominantly grazing on native vegetation with some irrigated crop growing close to the creek.

== History ==
The district was originally known as Monal Creek. In 1925, Monal Creek Provisional School opened, becoming Monal Creek State School in 1927.

The final stage of the Byellee to Monto railway line was completed in 1931 with the district being served by the Bukali railway station (24.8079°S 151.1555°E).

The locality takes its present name from the railway station. It is believed to be an Aboriginal word meaning either "cold" or "bad smell". In June 1936, the school was renamed Bukali State School to reflect its proximity to the Bukali railway station. It closed permanently in 1963. It was to east of the Bukali railway station and Gladstone-Monto Road (approx 24.80963°S 151.15696°E).

The railway line closed in 2002.

== Demographics ==
In the 2016 census, Bukali had a population of 63 people.

In the 2021 census, Bukali had a population of 57 people.

== Education ==
There are no schools in Bukali. The nearest government primary and secondary schools are Monto State School and Monto State High School respectively, both in neighbouring Monto to the south-west.
