= Pine–cypress forest =

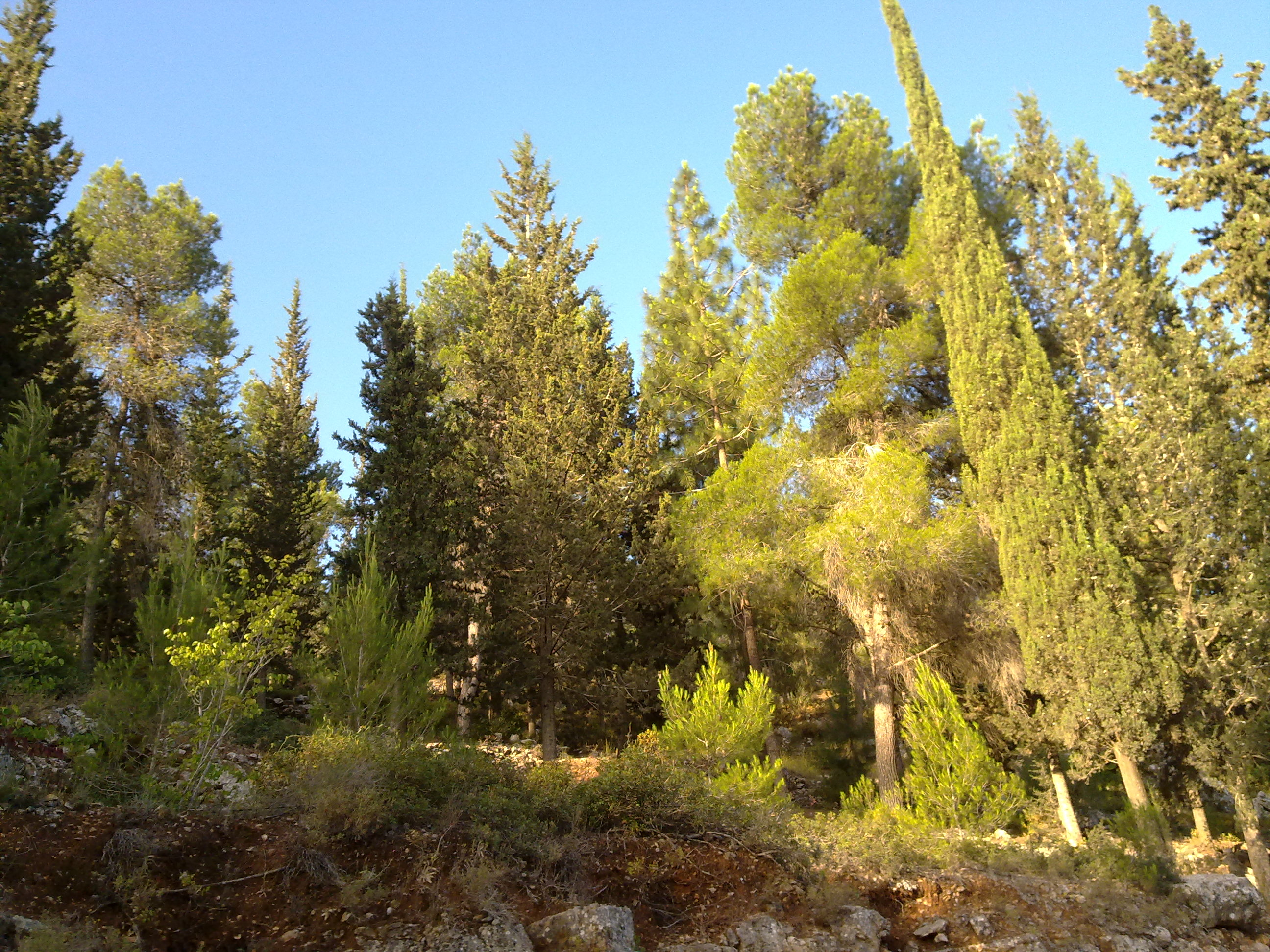
Pines and cypresses on the western slopes of Mount Herzl, at the circular road surrounding the Mount Herzl in Jerusalem Forest.

Pine–cypress forest is a type of mixed conifer woodland in which at least one species of pine (genus Pinus) and one species of cypress (family Cupressaceae) are present. Such forests are noted in several parts of the world, but are particularly well studied in Japan, and the United States.

== Ecology ==
A quality of these mixed conifer forests is the mutualistic relationship between pine and cypress trees. In Japanese pine-cypress forests, pine stumps have been found to help stimulate the growth and germination of cypress trees. Cypress trees are extremely sensitive to pH and prefer more acidic soils. Decaying pine stumps have a lower pH than surrounding soils, it is believed that this is the main factor influencing the increased prevalence of cypress seedlings. Analysis of evapotranspiration on pine and cypress wetlands found that both tree types are sensitive to changes in ambient temperature, but pines are more sensitive to changes in humidity. This difference in vulnerabilities could contribute to overall forest resiliency.

== Forest management ==
Like many mixed forest types, human forest management can impact the structures of pine-cypress forests. A study based in Taiwan used computer modeling to determine the stand density index for pine-cypress forests. This helps to measure interspecies relationships within forests, including species density, competition, and tree development. This is helpful for informing future management practices by maintaining a more current understanding of forest dynamics. Because both tree types can be very sensitive to changes in forest hydrology, additional management is necessary beyond density monitoring. Contentious management of flooding and drainage was shown to improve the health of both pine and cypress trees in a mixed ecosystem.

== Global occurrences ==
=== Japan ===
Pine-cypress forests can be found in much of central Japan. A heterogeneous landscape, consisting of pine-oak forests, timber plantations and cypress groves help to maintain this forest structure.

=== United States ===
==== California ====
California occurrences of pine–cypress forest are typically along Pacific coastal headlands. Understory species in these California pine–cypress forests include salal and western poison oak.

==== Florida ====
Many of the Florida occurrences of pine–cypress forest are in swampy areas such as the Everglades.

== See also ==
- Pygmy forest
