= Cania Dam =

Dam in Central Queensland, Australia

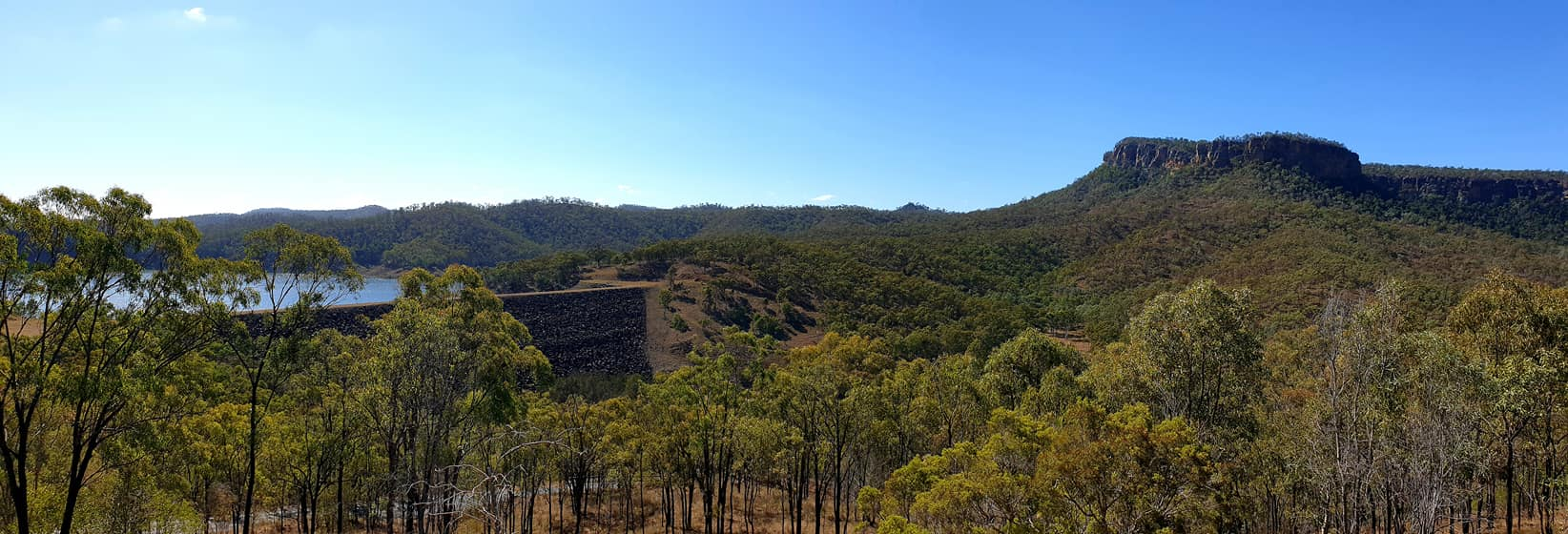
- The dam wall in 2021, looking northeast, towards Castle Mountain

- Location of the dam in Queensland
- Interactive map of Cania Dam
- Country: Australia
- Location: Cania, Wide Bay–Burnett, Queensland
- Coordinates: 24°38′55″S 150°59′06″E
- Status: Operational
- Opening date: 1982
- Operator: Sunwater

Dam and spillways
- Type of dam: Embankment dam
- Impounds: Three Moon Creek

Reservoir
- Total capacity: 88,580 ML (3,128×10^{6} cu ft)
- Catchment area: 280km2
- Surface area: 760 ha (1,900 acres)
- Maximum length: 350 m (1,150 ft)
- Maximum water depth: 40.1 m (132 ft)
- Normal elevation: 331 m (1,086 ft)

Cania Dam is an embankment dam in the Wide Bay–Burnett region of Queensland, Australia. The dam is situated on Three Moon Creek, a tributary of the Burnett River, and is situated 37 kilometres (23 mi) north west of Monto, in the locality of Cania.

== Overview ==
Completed in 1982, the earth and rock-fill embankment dam forms a reservoir that has a surface area of 7.6 square kilometres (1,878 acres), an average depth of 12 metres (39 ft) and a capacity of 88,580 megalitres (3,128×10^{6} cu ft).

The dam is named after the abandoned gold mining town of Cania, which was inundated by the lake as it filled. The reservoir is stocked with Australian bass, golden perch, silver perch, and saratoga under the Stocked Impoundment Permit Scheme; and a permit is required to fish in the reservoir.

In February 2003, after reaching a low of 3.31% of capacity, the reservoir overflowed again in late December 2010. The reservoir overflowed again in 2012, 2013 (reaching its highest recorded level of 133.32% capacity), 2015, and 2017.

== See also ==
- List of dams and reservoirs in Australia
