= Mulgildie =

- Town
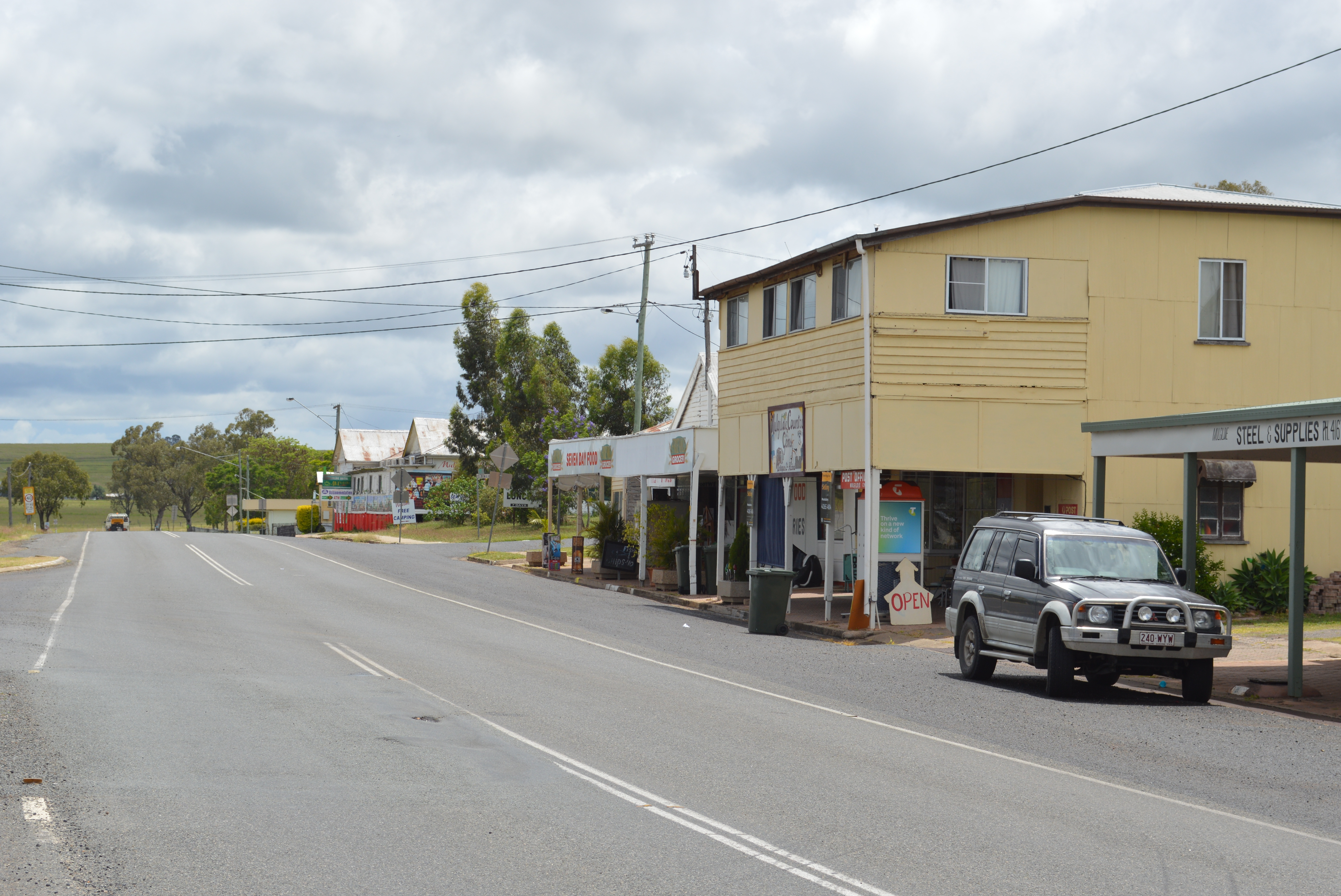
- The Burnett Highway passing through Mulgildie, 2017

- Interactive map of Mulgildie
- Coordinates: 24.9641°S 151.1336°E
- Country: Australia
- State: Queensland
- LGA: North Burnett Region
- Location: 12.1 km (7.5 mi) S of Monto; 112 km (70 mi) NNW of Gayndah; 183 km (114 mi) W of Bundaberg; 463 km (288 mi) NNW of Brisbane

Government
  - State electorate: Callide
  - Federal division: Flynn

Area
  - Total: 61.6 km^{2} (23.8 sq mi)

Population
  - Total: 147 (2021 census)
  - Density: 2.386/km^{2} (6.181/sq mi)
- Time zone: UTC+10:00 (AEST)
- Postcode: 4630
Localities around Mulgildie
Coominglah Forest	Three Moon	Splinter Creek
Coominglah Forest	Mulgildie	Splinter Creek
Selene	Selene	Tellebang

Mulgildie /ˈmʌlɡɪldi/ (formerly Mulgeldie) is a rural town and locality in the North Burnett Region, Queensland, Australia. In the 2021 census, the locality of Mulgildie had a population of 147 people.

== Geography ==
The town is located 463 kilometres (288 mi) by road from the state capital, Brisbane. The town is situated within the north of the locality. The Burnett Highway enters the locality from the south-east (Tellebang), passes through the town along Wattle Street and Monal Street, and exits to the north (Three Moon).

Mulgildie railway station is an abandoned railway station on the abandoned Mungar Junction to Monto railway line (24.9627°S 151.1326°E).

The land use is predominantly grazing on native vegetation with some crop growing.

== History ==
The town was named Mulgeldie in 1925, and is believed to be derived from the Aboriginal name bulgeldee referring to a deep waterhole on Three Moon Creek. The spelling was changed to Mulgildie on 15 March 1945.

A postal receiving office opened in 1902 and closed in 1905. Mulgildie Post Office opened on 6 January 1925, was renamed Mulgeldie in September of that year, reverted to Mulgildie in 1945 and closed in 1991.

The railway line from Mungar Junction to Monto opened to Mulgeldie in 1927. In order to build the extension to Monto, the workers' camp was relocated to Mulgeldie, including the tent school for the children of the workers, becoming Mulgildie Provisional School on 26 September 1927. In 1928, it was decided to establish a permanent school. Land was reserved for the school and a 21-by-18-foot (6.4 by 5.5 m) school building was erected to accommodate 40 students at a cost of £645. The new school building opened on 7 October 1929. On 1 January 1930, it became Mulgeldie State School.

Euruga State School opened on 7 June 1932, but was renamed on 13 June 1932 to Aberfeldie State School. It closed on 26 September 1937. The school building was relocated to Glen Leigh.

Splinter Creek Bridge State School opened on 3 April 1934. It closed on 6 October 1958.

The Mulgildie Hall (also known as the School of Arts) opened on 30 April 1938.

Mulgildie Presbyterian Church was built in 1950. It was at 6 Monal St (24.9636°S 151.1329°E). It is now closed and used as a house.

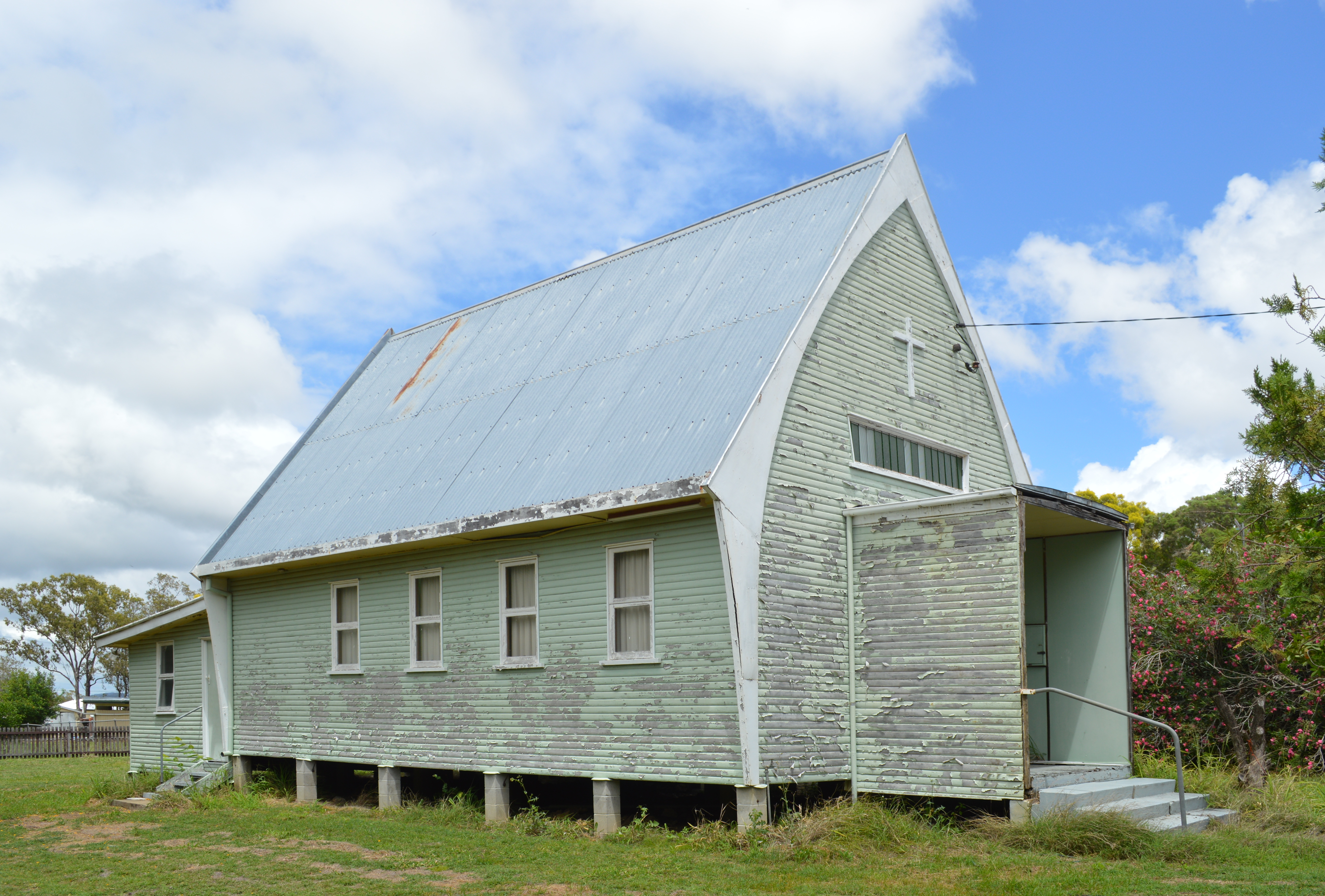
Mulgildie Anglican Church, 2019 (after closure)

St Mark's Anglican Church was dedicated on 10 May 1959 by Venerable Harold John Richards. The timber church was designed by Helmut Breckwoldt, who designed a similar church at Eidsvold. It was noted for its war memorial. Its closure circa 5 September 2009 was approved by Archbishop Phillip Aspinall. It was at 7 Brigalow Street (24.9639°S 151.1341°E).

== Demographics ==
In the 2006 census, the locality of Mulgildie had a population of 114 people.

In the 2016 census, the locality of Mulgildie had a population of 174 people.

In the 2021 census, the locality of Mulgildie had a population of 147 people.

== Heritage listings ==
Mulgildie has a number of heritage-listed sites, including:

- Mulgildie Homestead Cemetery, 69 Abercorn Road
- Mulgildie Cemetery, 29952 Burnett Highway
- Mulgildie Hall and Park, Palm Street

== Education ==
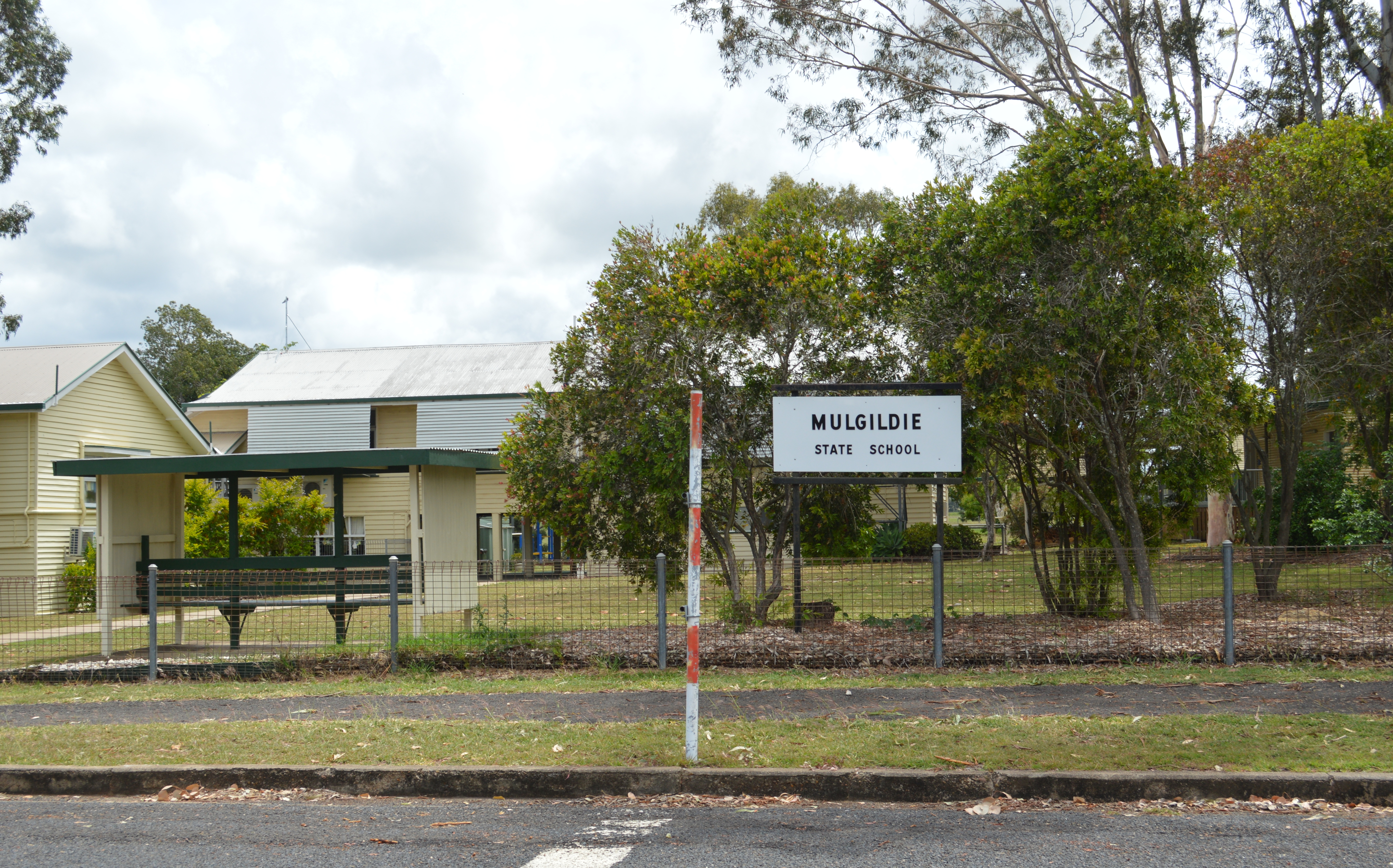
Mulgildie State School, 2019

Mulgildie State School is a government primary (Prep-6) school for boys and girls at 4 Brigalow Street (24.9634°S 151.1340°E). In 2017, the school had an enrolment of 25 students with 4 teachers (2 full-time equivalent) and 6 non-teaching staff (3 full-time equivalent). In 2018, the school had an enrolment of 19 students with 2 teachers and 5 non-teaching staff (2 full-time equivalent).

There are no secondary schools in Mulgildie. The nearest government secondary school is Monto State High School in Monto to the north.

== Amenities ==
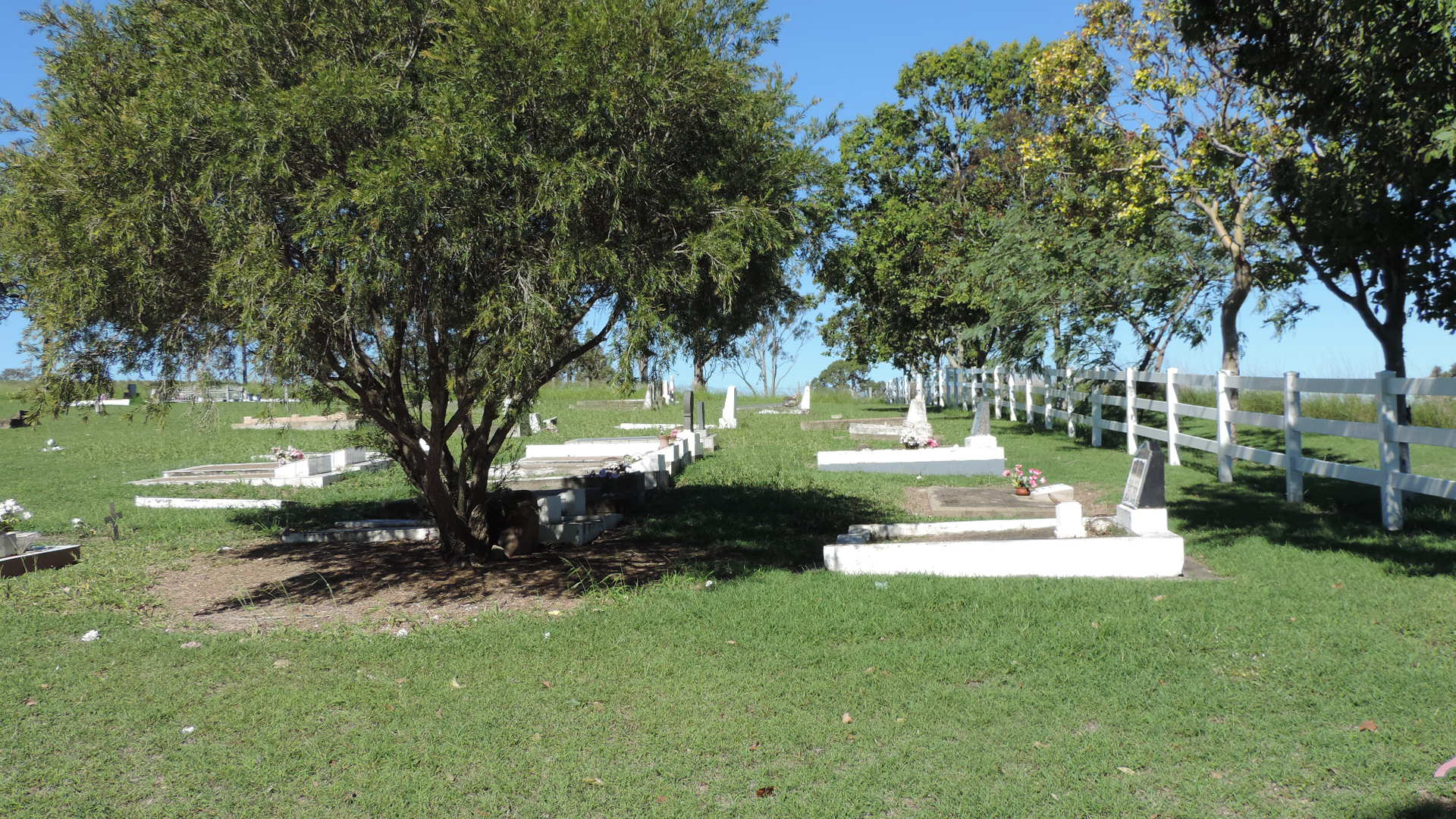
Mulgildie Cemetery, 2014

The Mulgildie branch of the Queensland Country Women's Association meets at the QCWA Rooms at 14 Pine Street (24.9645°S 151.1325°E).

Mulgildie Cemetery is at 29952 Burnett Highway (24.9689°S 151.1356°E).

The Mulgildie Hall is used for movies, dances, functions and meetings. It is at 13 Palm Street (24.9656°S 151.1315°E).

== Attractions ==
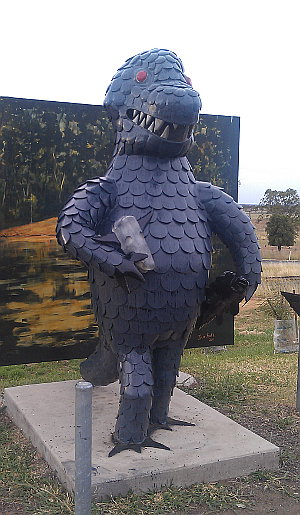
Bunyip statue, 2014

The sculpture of the Mulgildie Bunyip is on the roadside in Wattle Street (opposite Palm Street, 24.96495°S 151.13109°E). Tourists are encouraged to visit the Bunyip's watering hole approximately 10 minutes drive from Mulgildie, a place renowned for strange bubbling and churning waters and the subsequent disappearance of livestock.
