= Ventnor State School =

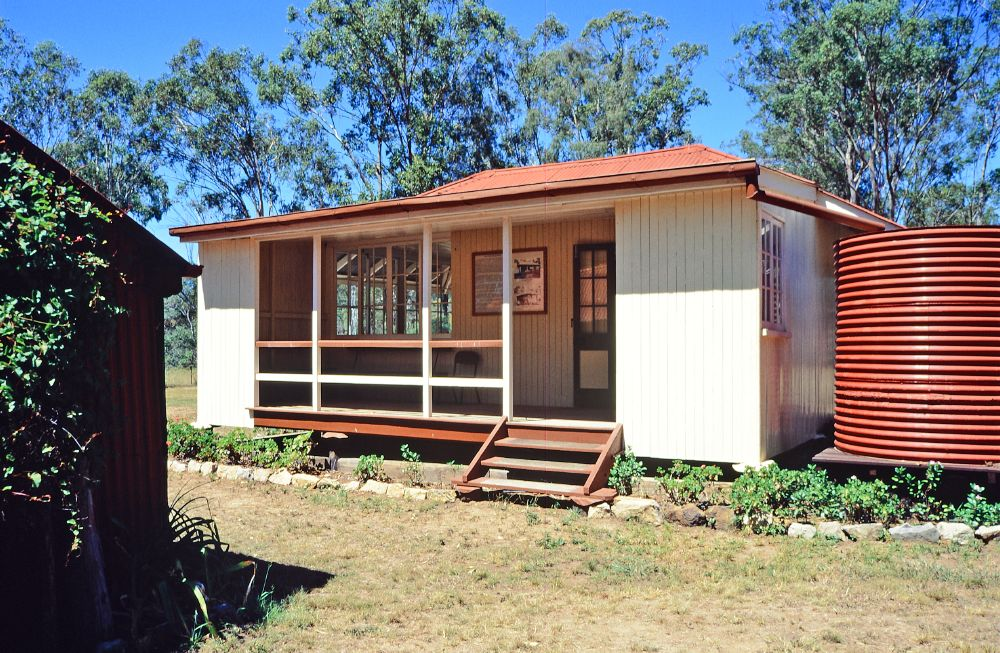
- Ventnor State School, 2002

- Location within Queensland Location within Australia
- 24.9104°S 151.2866°E
- Location: 1877 Yarrol Road, Ventnor, North Burnett Region, Queensland, Australia

History
- Design period: 1900–1914 (early 20th century)
- Built: 1914–1917

Queensland Heritage Register
- Official name: Ventnor State School, Yarrol State School
- Type: state heritage (built)
- Designated: 21 October 1992
- Reference no.: 600727
- Significant period: 1910s (fabric 1917 school); 1910s (historical); 1914–1950s (social)
- Significant components: school/school room, play shed

Ventnor State School is a heritage-listed former state school at 1877 Yarrol Road, Ventnor, North Burnett Region, Queensland, Australia. It was built from 1914 to 1917. It is also known as Yarrol Road State School. It was added to the Queensland Heritage Register on 21 October 1992.

== History ==
The former Ventnor State School was originally constructed as an open-air school in 1914 in Maryborough. The school was located at Teddington Road, Tinana and opened on 11 November 1914.

As an open-air structure, the school was an example of one of the experimental designs for state primary schools instigated by the Department of Works in 1914. The schools were a response to the advocacy that suggested maximum ventilation was necessary for a school building. Open-air schools were constructed for only a short period and were not to become a permanent feature of Queensland's State School architecture. The problems associated with these schools outweighed the advantages and by 1922 the open-air school was phased out and more traditional designs reappeared.

By 1917, a new school building was constructed for the school at Tinana, now Parke State School, and the old open-air school was used as a play shed. In 1929 an application was made for a school at Wongalee and the old open-air school at Tinana was transported to Wongalee. School commenced at Wongalee on 21 September 1929 and in 1932 permission was granted for the construction of a play shed. It is likely that the open-air school was enclosed at this time along with the addition of a skillion-roofed verandah.

In April 1945, R.M. Marshall delivered an application to the Department of Public Instruction in the Yarrol Road area. The application was approved and Tim Maloney, then owner of portion 111, donated three acres to the Secretary of Public Instruction on 25 September 1945 as the site for the new school. The school which had been moved to Wongalee was once again removed and transported to its present site at Yarrol Road, Ventnor.

The Yarrol Road State School (at it was then called) commenced classes on 3 June 1946 with Doreen Turner as teacher. In July 1948, it was renamed Ventnor State School. The school continued operate until 22 April 1960 when it was closed due to low enrolment numbers.

In 1963, local residents made an offer of £150 to purchase the school from the Department of Education and the property was transferred to the Ventnor Progress Association on 15 March 1963. Since that time the school complex has been used as headquarters for the progress association, for religious group services, farming and pastoral bodies and fire control groups and was regularly used as a polling booth. The Ventnor Progress Association continues to own and maintain the premises.

== Description ==
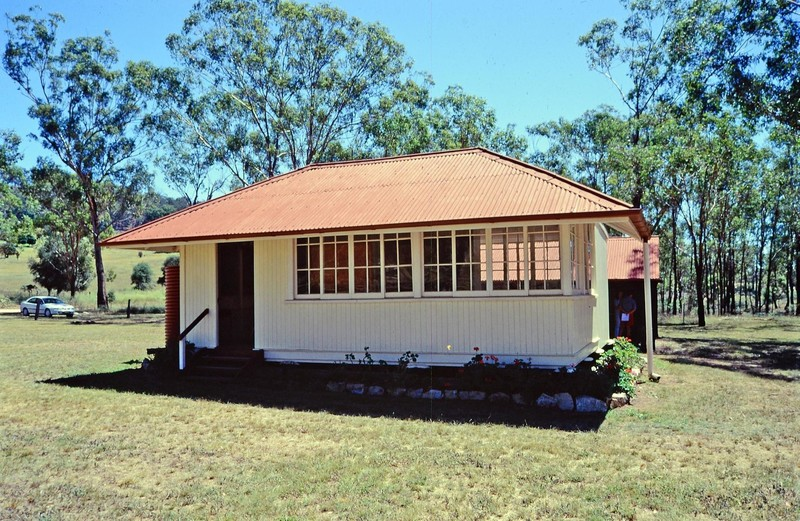
Ventnor State School (former), 2002

The former Ventnor State School is located on Yarrol Road, Ventnor. The school site consists of a one-room school building with verandah, a play shed, a girls' and boys' toilet, remnants of an old swing post and a flagpole. The block of land is a flat piece in a bush setting surrounded by a fence with steel cyclone mesh gates. New plantings along the front fence are memorials to donors and life members of the Progress Association.

The school building is a simple structure of timber with a corrugated iron hipped roof truncated where a skillion-roofed verandah has been added on its western side. The building sits on low timber stumps and a small set of stairs on the eastern side gains entrance to the classroom. The walls are timber tongue-and-groove vertical joints and the schoolroom has sliding 6 pane windows on three walls. The room has a coved timber ceiling with a central lattice vent and a large timber support beam across the width of the room. The room contains some of its original desks and chairs dating from 1946 as well as other original pieces such as framed embroidery by former students.

A doorway gains access to the verandah at the front of the room on the western side. The verandah contains evidence of hooks used for hanging school bags on its rear walls. There is a small storeroom located at the front of the verandah.

The play shed is adjacent to the school building on the verandah side. It is a pole frame structure with a corrugated iron roof, two walls and dirt floor. The play shed contains the original timber bar which was used for holding the school children's saddles during the school day.

The two toilets are located at opposite corners of the western side of the site and are timber-framed structures with corrugated iron roofs and comprises a cubicle and entry.

== Heritage listing ==
Ventnor State School was listed on the Queensland Heritage Register on 21 October 1992 having satisfied the following criteria.

The place is important in demonstrating the evolution or pattern of Queensland's history.

The former Ventnor State School is important in demonstrating the development of Queensland's state education system, in particular its response to the needs of small rural communities in the first half of the twentieth century.

The place is important in demonstrating the principal characteristics of a particular class of cultural places.

The former Ventnor State School demonstrates the principal characteristics of an early 20th century school complex including the play shed, toilets and single room school building. Although the school building has been enclosed, the building is important as a remaining example of an original open-air school which were a feature of schooling in Queensland from about 1914 to 1922. The open-air school was a standard design implemented by the Department of Works in 1914 in response to climate and the need for ventilation. The open-air school was a testament to the experimentation undertaken by the Department of Works in relation to developing suitable school environments for Queensland children.

The place is important because of its aesthetic significance.

The school has aesthetic significance as a well-kept, small-scale complex in a bush setting with structures that complement each other in size and form.

The place has a strong or special association with a particular community or cultural group for social, cultural or spiritual reasons.

The former Ventnor State School has a special association with the local community as a place of education and community gathering since 1946. It also has special association with past generations of school communities from Tinana and Wongalee, having operated as a state primary school at both these locations.
