= Monto, Queensland =

Monto
- Town
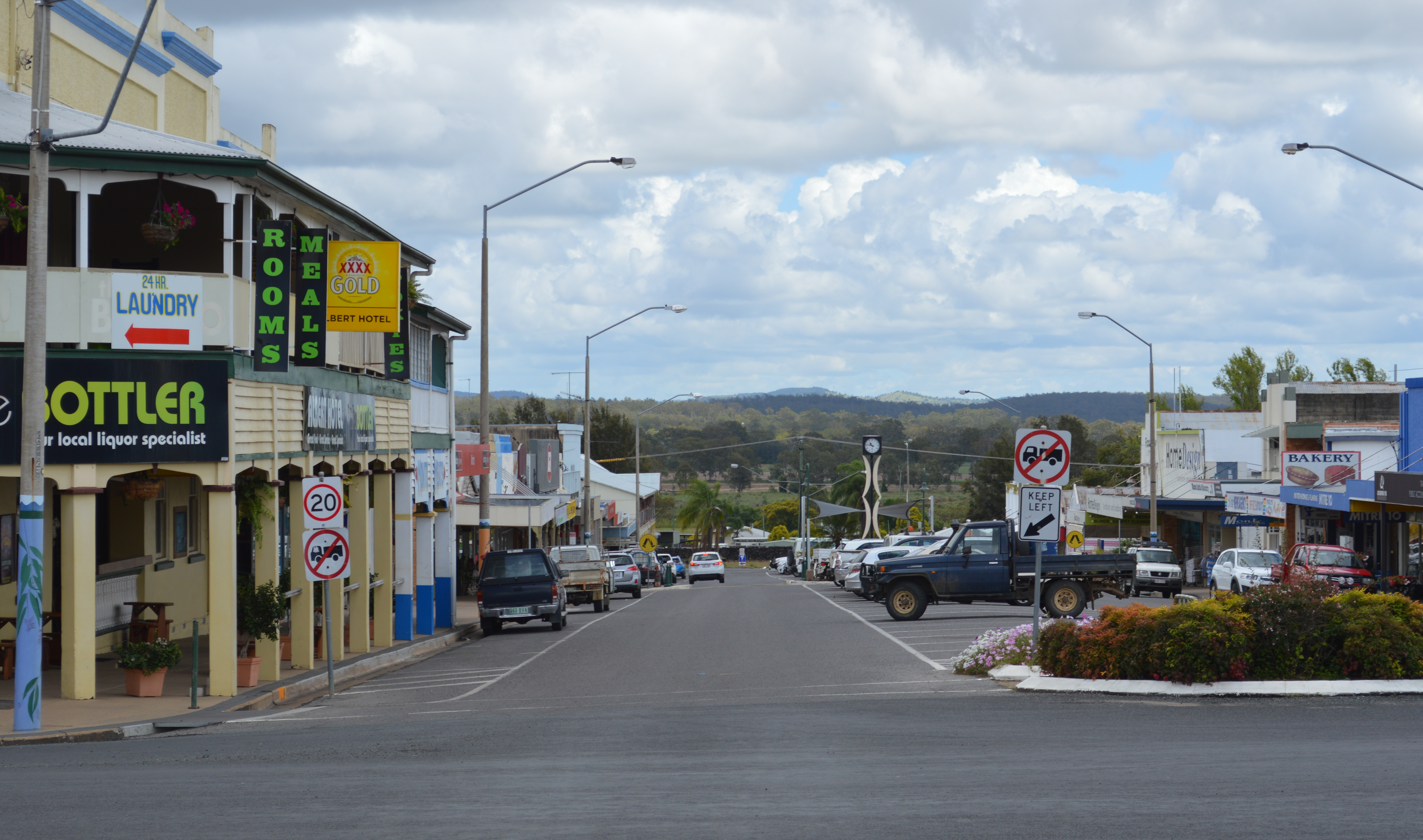
- Looking down Newton Street to the Burnett Highway, 2017

- Interactive map of Monto
- Coordinates: 24.8641°S 151.1233°E
- Country: Australia
- State: Queensland
- LGA: North Burnett Region
- Location: 124 km (77 mi) NNW of Gayndah; 175 km (109 mi) W of Bundaberg; 160 km (99 mi) SSW of Gladstone; 484 km (301 mi) NNW of Brisbane
- Established: 1924

Government
  - State electorate: Callide
  - Federal division: Flynn

Area
  - Total: 59.2 km^{2} (22.9 sq mi)
- Elevation: 248.7 m (816 ft)

Population
  - Total: 1,156 (2021 census)
  - Density: 19.527/km^{2} (50.57/sq mi)
- Time zone: UTC+10:00 (AEST)
- Postcode: 4630
- Mean max temp: 27.3 °C (81.1 °F)
- Mean min temp: 12.8 °C (55.0 °F)
- Annual rainfall: 732.6 mm (28.84 in)
Localities around Monto
Moonford	Mungungo	Bukali
Moonford	Monto	Cannindah
Coominglah Forest	Three Moon	Three Moon

Monto (/ˈmɒntoʊ/) is a rural town and locality in the North Burnett Region, Queensland, Australia. In the 2021 census, the locality of Monto had a population of 1,156.

== Geography ==
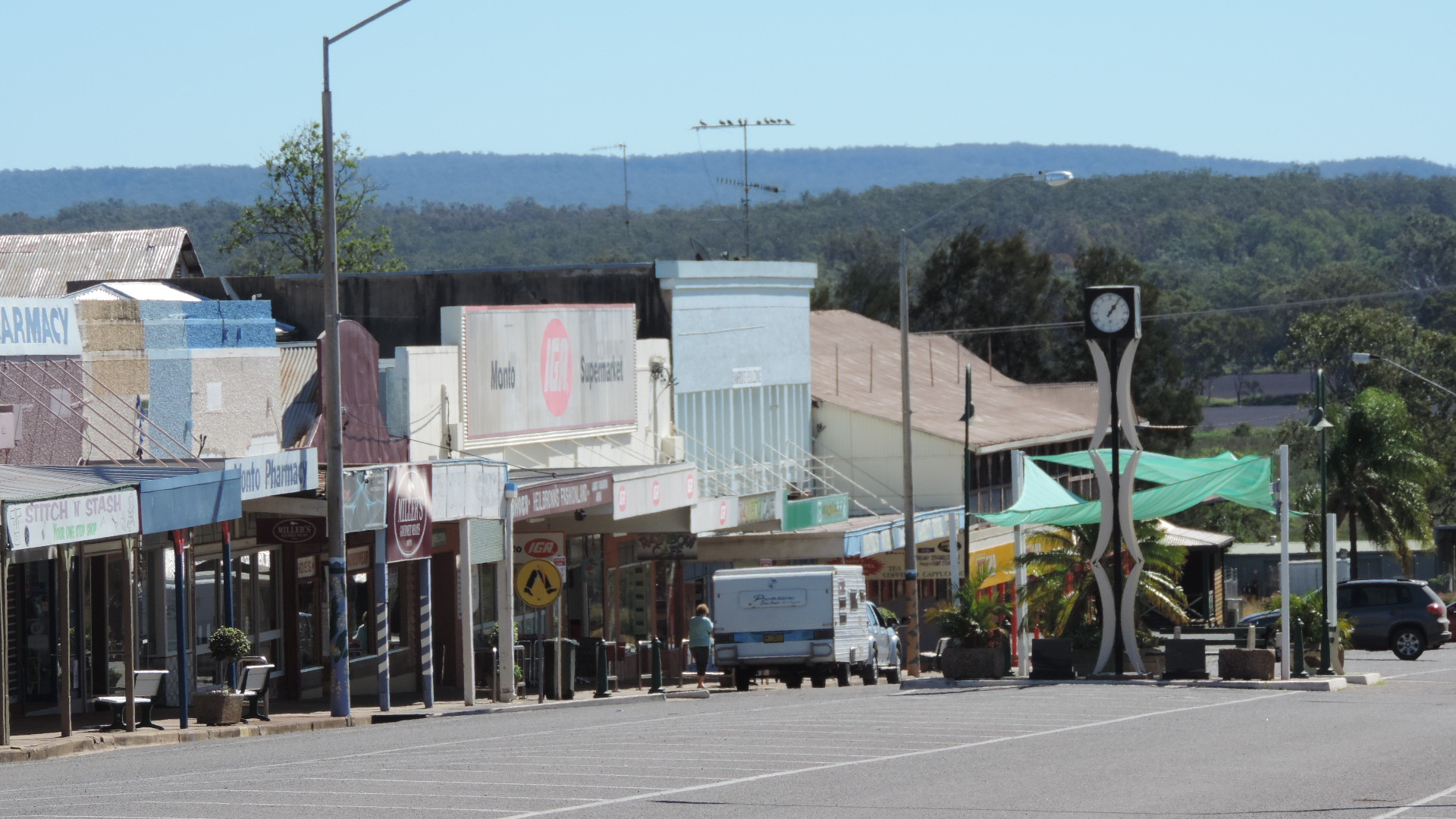
View down Newton Street, 2014

Monto is located on the Burnett Highway 500 kilometres (310 mi) north-west of Brisbane and 235 kilometres (146 mi) south of Rockhampton. The Gladstone–Monto Road intersects with the Burnett Highway in the town.

The main street in the town is Newton Street.

=== Ancient past ===
In the Mississippian era (358–323 mya) also known as the Early Carboniferous period, the area was part of a shallow sea where coral formed a coral reef that became carbonate rock (limestone) underlying the area. Cannindah Reef was the largest-known reef from this period.

== History ==
Gureng Gureng (also known as Gooreng Gooreng, Goreng Goreng, Goeng, Gurang, Goorang Goorang, Korenggoreng) is an Australian Aboriginal language spoken by the Gureng Gureng people. The Gooreng Gooreng language region includes the towns of Bundaberg, Gin Gin and Miriam Vale extending south towards Childers, inland to Monto and Mt Perry.

The town takes its name from its railway station, which in turn is an Aboriginal word meaning ridgy plain.

Europeans settled in the area in the late 1840s, maintaining large pastoral holdings at the northern end of the Burnett Valley. Gold unearthed along Three Moon Creek — a tributary of the Burnett River — in the 1870s attracted further settlers. The original site of the diggings, 30 kilometres (19 mi) north of present-day Monto, has since been flooded by construction of Cania Dam.

Norton Diggings Provisional School opened circa 1881 and is believed to have been repositioned circa 1892 and renamed Norton Goldfield Provisional School. It closed circa 1903 but reopened in 1904 as Norton Provisional School, but then closed in 1907.

The township of Monto was not formally established until 1924 in which year the post office opened.

Lobbying for a school commenced in 1924. Monto State School opened on 25 January 1926.

On Wednesday 17 April 1929, Archbishop James Duhig dedicated the Catholic Church of the Little Flower in Monto. Unusually the church had been built on leasehold land as freehold was unavailable. It was at 29 Rutherford Street (24.86760°S 151.12222°E). It now serves as the church hall for St Theresa's Catholic Church (built circa 1990).

Monto Baptist Church opened on 23 April 1930. It was at 24 Kelvin Street (24.8661°S 151.1225°E). It closed in 1997 and passed into private ownership.

St Therese's Catholic Primary School was opened on 5 February 1940 by the Presentation Sisters.

With dwindling gold reserves, Monto turned its economy towards farming and logging, two of the region's major industries today. Deposits of thermal coal and limestone have been discovered in the shire.

Monto State High School opened on 28 January 1964.

The town was the administrative centre of Monto Shire until its amalgamation in 2008 into the new North Burnett Region local government area.

Selene Public Hall was on Selene Hall Road in Selene. Having been unused for about ten years, it was relocated in February 2017 to the Monto Historical Centre at 20 Flinders Street, Monto (24.86336°S 151.11068°E), for use as an archive for the photographs of the Monto Historical Society.

== Demographics ==
In the 2021 census, the locality of Monto had a population of 1,156.

In the 2016 census, the locality of Monto had a population of 1,189.

In the 2011 census, the locality of Monto had a population of 1,307.

In the 2006 census, the town of Monto had a population of 1,362.

== Amenities ==
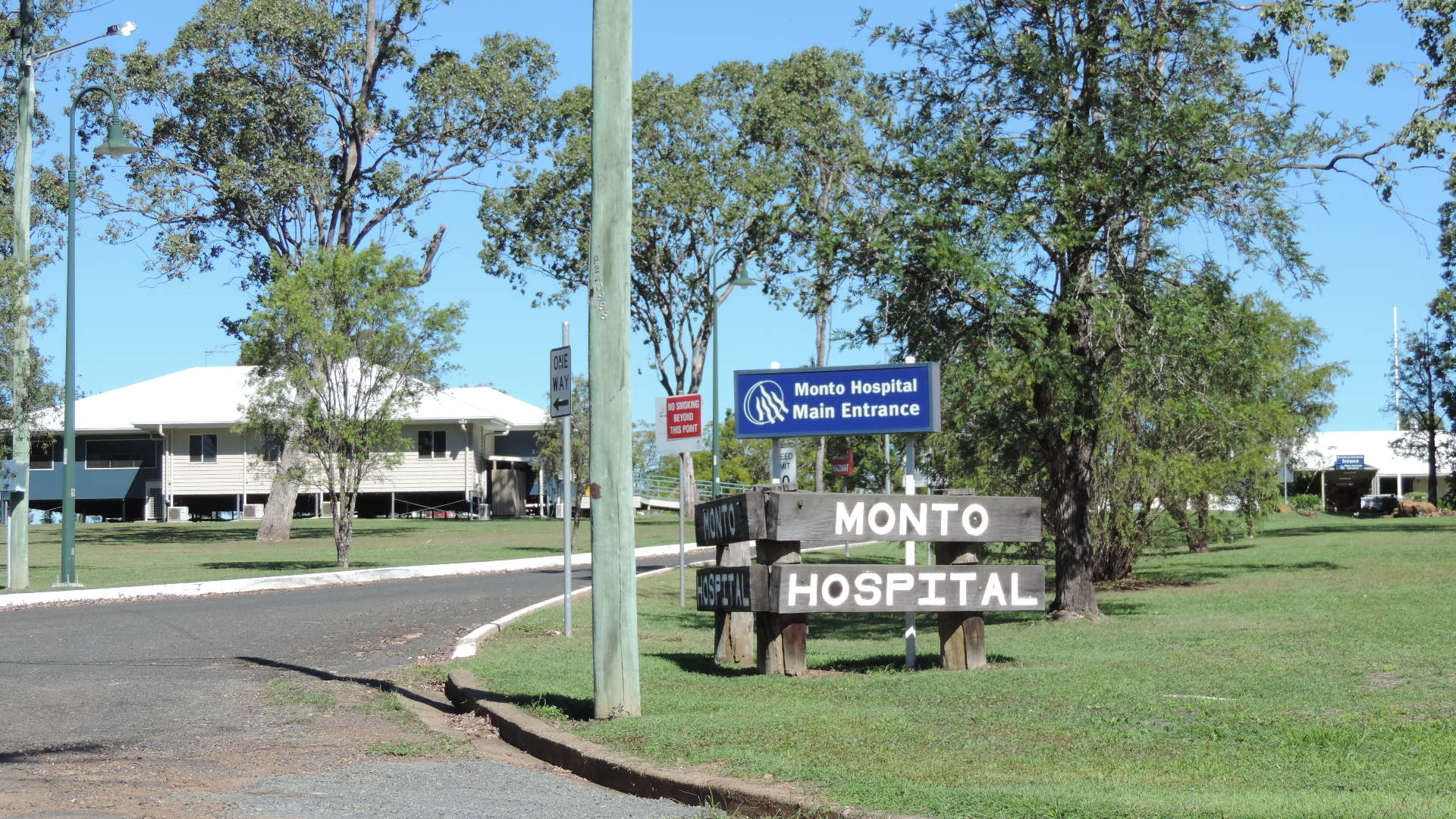
Monto Hospital, 2014

Monto has a cultural and historical complex with a museum reserve, sporting facilities, swimming pool and golf club.

Monto Hospital is a 14-bed hospital operated by Queensland Health at 35 Flinders Street (24.8663°S 151.1127°E). It has a 24-hour emergency service.

The North Burnett Regional Council operates a public library in Monto at 50 Newton Street.

The Monto-Bancroft branch of the Queensland Country Women's Association meets at 9 Rutherford Street.

St Theresa's Catholic Church is on the north-west corner of Rutherford Street and Maxwell Street (24.86733°S 151.12153°E).

== Education ==
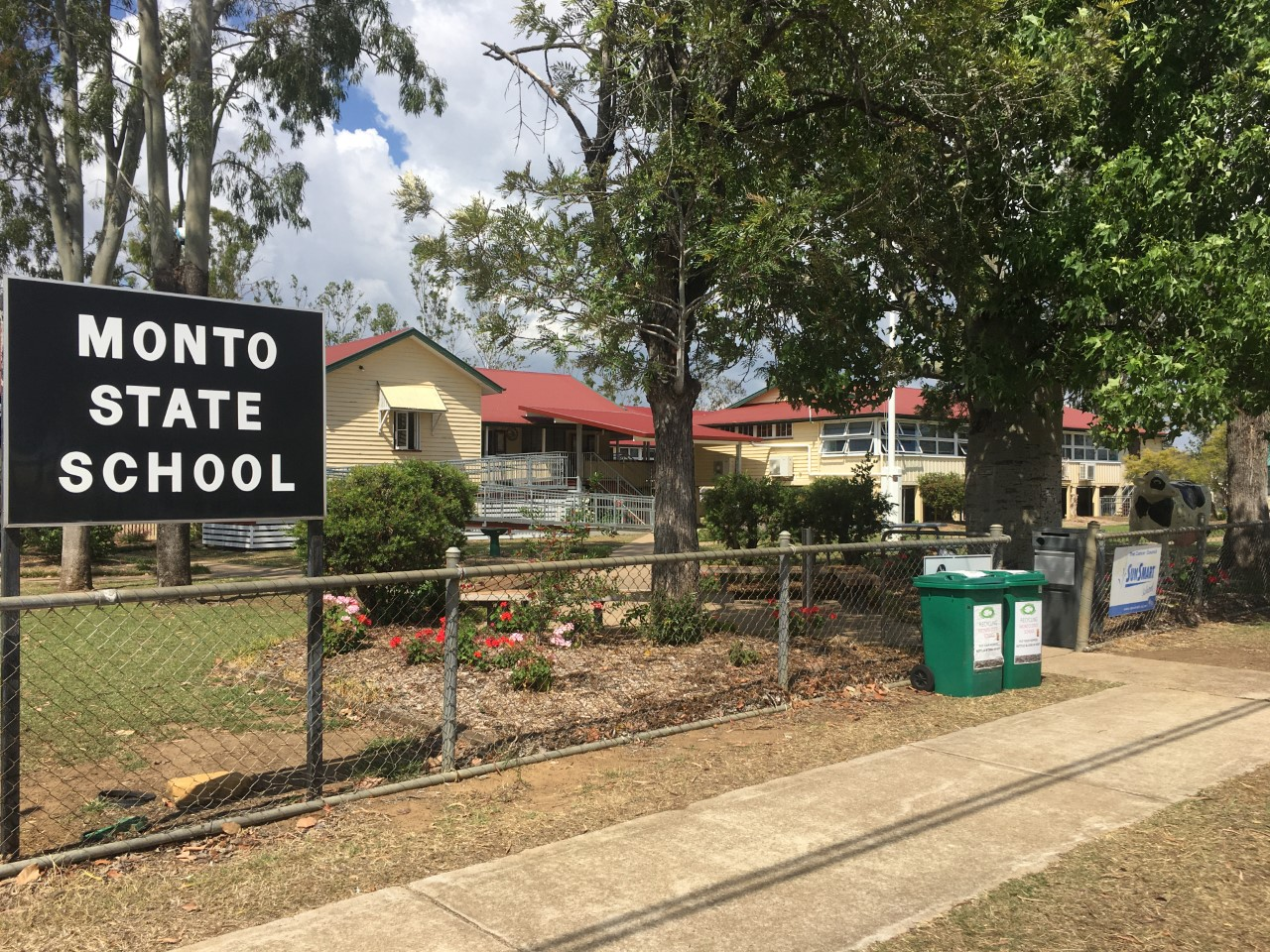
Monto State School

Monto State School is a government primary (Prep–6) school for boys and girls at 3 Leichhardt Street (24.8678°S 151.1182°E). In 2017, the school had an enrolment of 110 students with 9 teachers (7 full-time equivalent) and 11 non-teaching staff (5 full-time equivalent).

St Therese's Catholic Primary School is a Catholic primary (Prep–6) school for boys and girls at 2–10 Rayleigh Street (24.8666°S 151.1214°E). In 2017, the school had an enrolment of 88 students with 9 teachers (8 full-time equivalent) and 3 non-teaching staff (2 full-time equivalent).

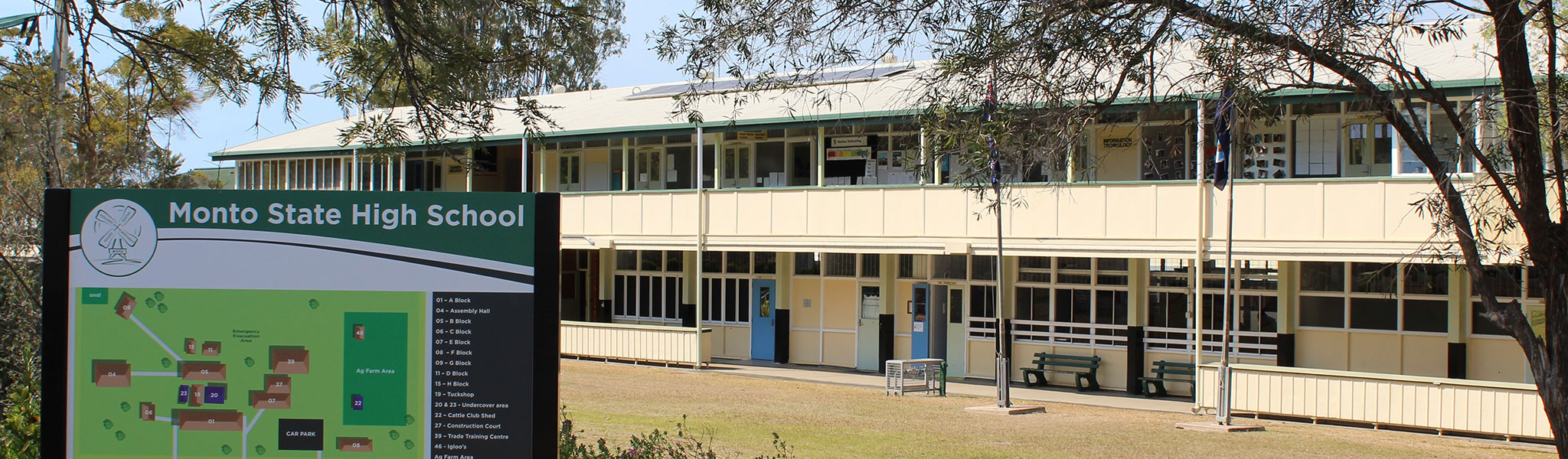
Monto State High School

Monto State High School is a government secondary (7–12) school for boys and girls at Mouatt Street (24.8699°S 151.1185°E). In 2017, the school had an enrolment of 159 students with 23 teachers (20 full-time equivalent) and 19 non-teaching staff (11 full-time equivalent).

Monto Cluster Special Education Program is a primary and secondary (Prep–12) special education program at Monto State High School.

== Heritage listings ==
Monto has a number of heritage-listed sites, including:

- Monto Cemetery No 1 and No 2, Gladstone-Monto Road
- Monto Watertower and Rotary Park, corner of Huxley, Bell & Edison Streets
- Monto Town Design (also known as Monto Government Administration Precinct), Lister, Kelvin, Lyell & Faraday Streets
- Hotel Albert, Newton Street
- Monto Shire Hall, Newton Street
- former Monto Court House, 53 Newton Street
- former Monto Council Office and Chambers (also known as Sunshine House), Rutherford Street
- Monto Post Office, corner Rutherford and Newton Streets
- Ventnor State School, Yarrol Road, Ventnor

== Tourism ==
Tourism is also a major industry in the region. Besides being a major highway town, the chief local attractions are Cania Gorge National Park and Cania Dam, 20 kilometres (12 mi) north of town.

Monto has also added to its attractions as being (as of July 2020) the most northerly silo art installation in Australia. Its "Three Moons" silos depict several stories of the past, including the era of gold mining, cattle mustering and The Dreaming. It also has a mural on an old water tower.

== Dairy farming ==
Monto was once the centre of a thriving dairy industry, with more than 400 dairy farms in the area, but deregulation in the 1990s changed that. The number of dairy farms dropped to three.

== Mining ==
In 2006, Monto Minerals floated on the Alternative Investment Market in London, raising approximately A$41 million before expenses. In 2007 it announced plans to begin commercial production of feldspar, ilmenite, apatite and titanomagnetite from its site at the Goondicum crater, just outside the eastern border of Monto Shire. It was reported in September 2008 that Monto Minerals had placed itself in voluntary administration. The mine was then operated by Belridge Enterprises from September 2012 to June 2013, and Melior Resources from April to July 2015 when production was halted due to low market prices. After resuming operations the mine was again closed when Melior Resources appointed a voluntary administrator in September 2019.

Coal mining company Macarthur Coal also owns large amounts of land in the Mulgildie area.

== Facilities ==
Despite the name, Monto Aerodrome (IATA: MNQ, ICAO: YMTO) is at 375 Airport Road in neighbouring Three Moon to the south (24.8922°S 151.1015°E). It has a 1,311-metre (4,301 ft) bitumen-sealed runway. It is operated by the North Burnett Regional Council.

== Climate ==
Climate data for Monto
Month	Jan	Feb	Mar	Apr	May	Jun	Jul	Aug	Sep	Oct	Nov	Dec	Year
Record high °C (°F)	41.3 (106.3)	43.2 (109.8)	40.1 (104.2)	36.4 (97.5)	32.8 (91.0)	30.6 (87.1)	30.0 (86.0)	35.6 (96.1)	38.0 (100.4)	39.0 (102.2)	41.7 (107.1)	41.1 (106.0)	43.2 (109.8)
Mean daily maximum °C (°F)	32.1 (89.8)	31.4 (88.5)	30.1 (86.2)	27.8 (82.0)	24.3 (75.7)	21.4 (70.5)	21.1 (70.0)	23.3 (73.9)	26.5 (79.7)	29.2 (84.6)	31.0 (87.8)	32.1 (89.8)	27.5 (81.5)
Mean daily minimum °C (°F)	19.4 (66.9)	19.1 (66.4)	17.5 (63.5)	13.7 (56.7)	9.9 (49.8)	6.8 (44.2)	5.5 (41.9)	6.5 (43.7)	9.7 (49.5)	13.6 (56.5)	16.3 (61.3)	18.4 (65.1)	13.0 (55.4)
Record low °C (°F)	12.5 (54.5)	12.8 (55.0)	8.2 (46.8)	2.7 (36.9)	−1.8 (28.8)	−3.9 (25.0)	−4.5 (23.9)	−2.8 (27.0)	0.3 (32.5)	2.1 (35.8)	4.9 (40.8)	7.2 (45.0)	−4.5 (23.9)
Average precipitation mm (inches)	107.2 (4.22)	111.0 (4.37)	78.5 (3.09)	42.8 (1.69)	43.5 (1.71)	35.4 (1.39)	35.7 (1.41)	25.0 (0.98)	23.7 (0.93)	58.8 (2.31)	74.0 (2.91)	94.1 (3.70)	730.5 (28.76)
Average precipitation days	10.0	9.6	9.1	6.2	6.3	5.4	5.4	4.3	3.9	6.8	7.5	9.1	83.6
Average relative humidity (%)	49	50	50	47	50	48	45	40	37	38	41	44	45

== Notable people from Monto ==
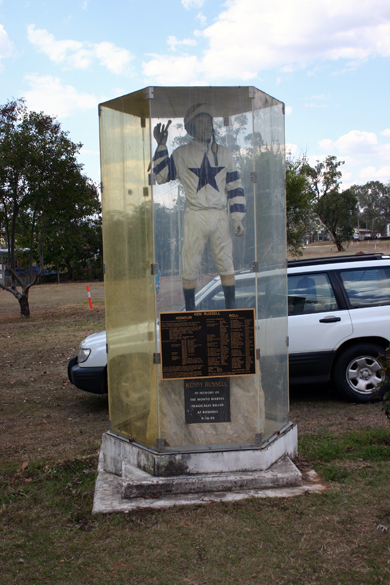
Memorial to Monto's most famous son, jockey Kenny Russell.

- Jock R. Anderson
- Gordon Bennett (artist)
- Michael Caton
- Prof. Megan Davis was born here in 1975.
- Gil Jamieson
- Mal Meninga
- Owen Pattie
- Jeff Seeney
- Mark Steketee
- Daphne Seeney

== See also ==
- Shire of Monto
- The Boyne Valley
- Cania Gorge National Park
