= Cheltenham (disambiguation) =

Cheltenham is a town in Gloucestershire, England.

Cheltenham may also refer to:

== Places ==
=== Australia ===
- Cheltenham, New South Wales
- Cheltenham, Queensland, a locality in the North Burnett Region, Queensland, Australia
- Cheltenham, South Australia
  - Electoral district of Cheltenham, a state electoral district in South Australia based around the suburb
  - Cheltenham Park Racecourse, a racing track located within the suburb (closed in 2010)
- Cheltenham, Victoria
  - Cheltenham railway station, Melbourne

=== United States ===
- Cheltenham, South Chicago
- Cheltenham, Maryland
- Cheltenham, St. Louis, Missouri, a neighborhood
- Cheltenham Township, Montgomery County, Pennsylvania
  - Cheltenham, Pennsylvania, a census-designated place within Cheltenham Township

=== New Zealand ===
- Cheltenham, an area in the suburb of Devonport in Auckland adjacent to Cheltenham Beach
- Cheltenham, Manawatu, a locality in New Zealand

=== Elsewhere ===
- Cheltenham, Ontario, Canada
- Cheltenham, St Vincent and the Grenadines

== Surname ==
- Richard Cheltenham (born 1941), Barbadian politician

== Other uses ==
- Cheltenham Festival, a meeting in the National Hunt racing calendar in the UK
- Cheltenham (typeface), an American typeface
- Cheltenham Town F.C., the town's football team
- Cheltenham (UK Parliament constituency)
- "Cheltenham" (Three Up, Two Down), a 1989 television episode
- SS Cheltenham, several steamships with this name
