= Abercorn, Queensland =

Abercorn
- Town
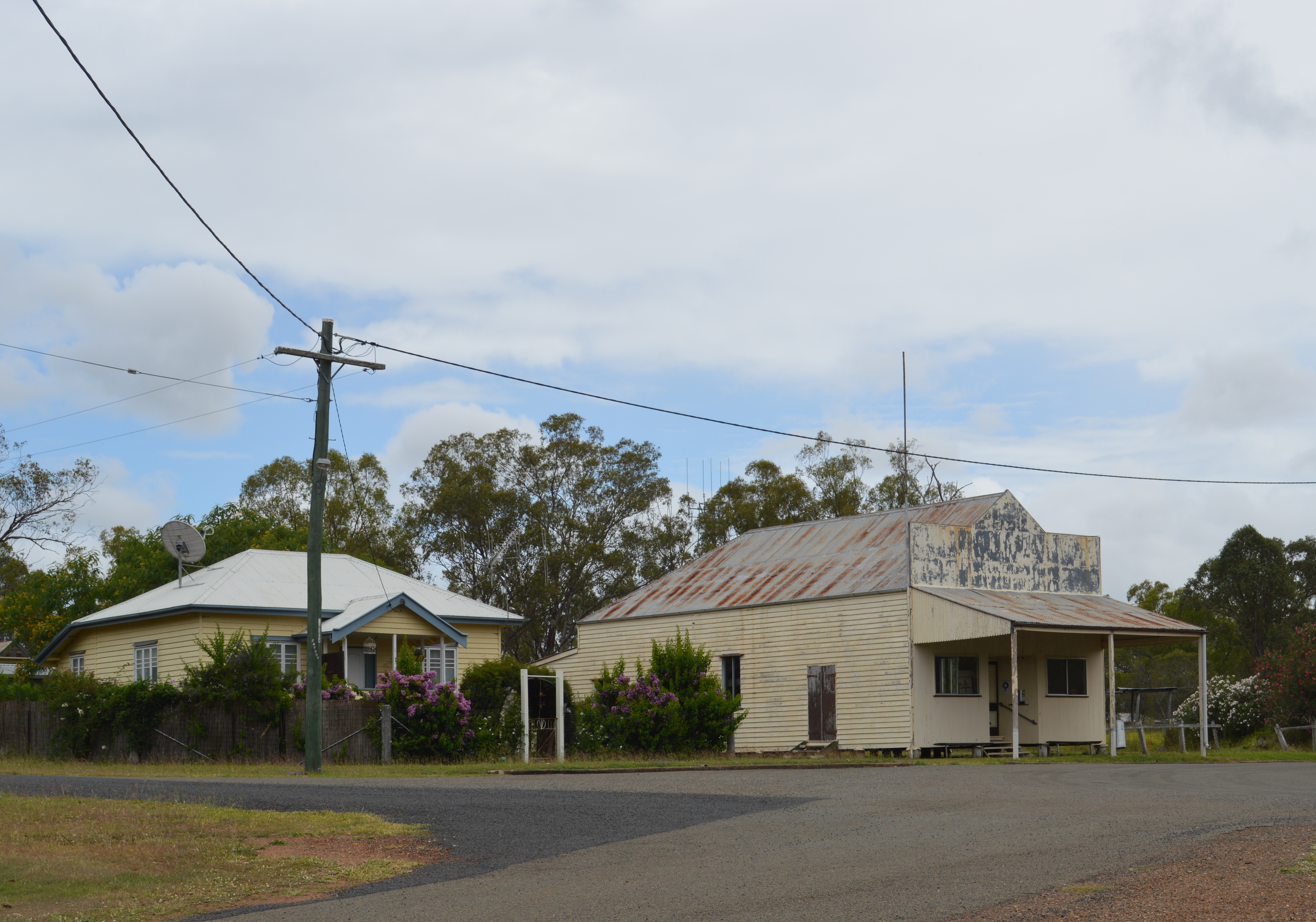
- A former shop and a house at Abercorn

- Interactive map of Abercorn
- Coordinates: 25.1330°S 151.1294°E
- Country: Australia
- State: Queensland
- LGA: North Burnett Region
- Location: 74 km (46 mi) NW of Gayndah; 127 km (79 mi) W of Bundaberg; 322 km (200 mi) NW of Brisbane

Government
  - State electorate: Callide
  - Federal division: Flynn

Area
  - Total: 94.3 km^{2} (36.4 sq mi)

Population
  - Total: 41 (2021 census)
  - Density: 0.435/km^{2} (1.126/sq mi)
- Time zone: UTC+10:00 (AEST)
- Postcode: 4627
Localities around Abercorn
Glenleigh	Kapaldo	Langley
Waruma Dam	Abercorn	Yarrol
Waruma Dam	Cynthia	Yarrol

Abercorn is a rural town and locality in the North Burnett Region, Queensland, Australia. In the 2021 census, the locality of Abercorn had a population of 41 people.

== Geography ==
The Burnett River forms the eastern boundary of Abercorn. Three Moon Creek passes close to the town and across the locality into the Burnett River. The Burnett Highway passes through the locality but there is no direct access from the highway to the town; to get to Abercorn, the turn-off from the highway is onto Wuruma Dam Road at Cynthia. There is a state forest in the north of the locality extending into Kapaldo.

== History ==
The town takes its name from its railway station, which was named on 19 June 1925 by the Queensland Railway Department, possibly after the champion thoroughbred horse Abercorn The origin of the railway station name may be after the champion thoroughbred horse Abercorn or after Abercorn Homestead as a gesture to "Old Boss", Robert David Hamilton owner of the property.

Abercorn State School opened on 3 May 1927. In 1931, an old school building was relocated from Wilson Valley State School to Abercorn State School.

Langley Flat Provisional School opened on 5 September 1927. In 1929 it became Langley Flat State School. It closed on 28 January 1947.

A post office opened in Abercorn about February 1928; it closed on 11 June 1986.

Goomaran Creek Provisional School opened on 29 April 1931. In 1932 it became Goomaran Creek State School. It closed on 9 May 1948.

Glen Loch State School opened on 27 August 1931 and closed in 1944. It was on the Burnett Highway (approx 25.1484°S 151.1797°E).

== Demographics ==
In the 2016 census, the locality of Abercorn had a population of 46 people.

In the 2021 census, the locality of Abercorn had a population of 41 people.

== Education ==
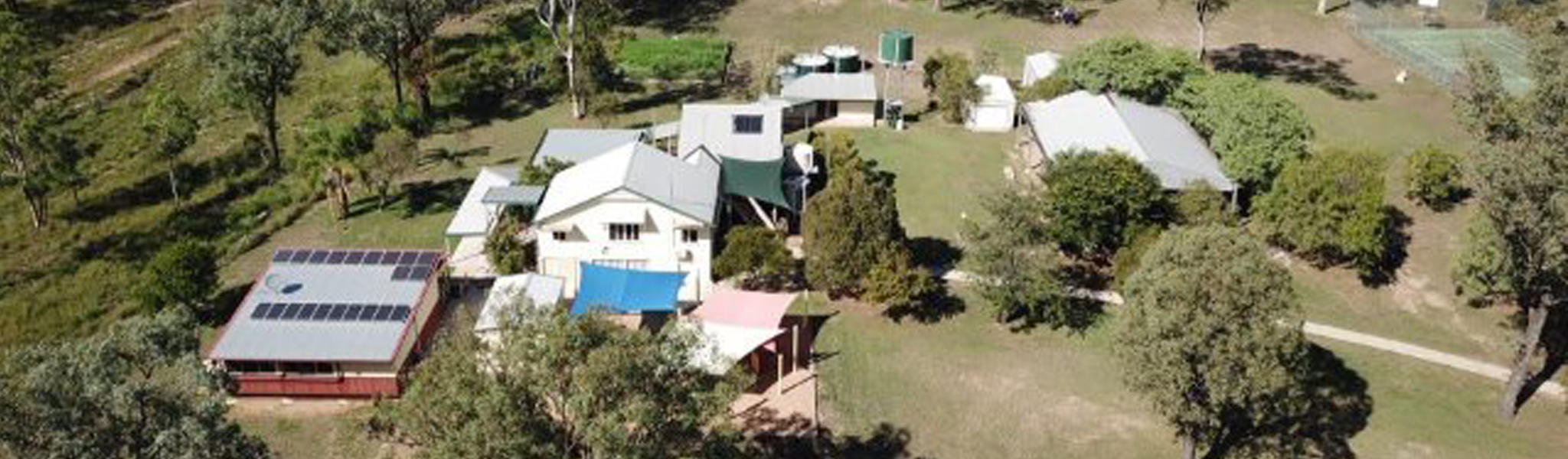
Abercorn State School, 2023

Abercorn State School is a government primary (Prep-6) school for boys and girls at 957 Wuruma Dam Road (25.1359°S 151.1270°E). In 2012, the school had an enrolment of 21 students in a single classroom with 3 teachers (1.5 full-time equivalent). In 2018, the school had an enrolment of 18 students with 3 teachers (1 full-time equivalent) and 4 non-teaching staff (2 full-time equivalent).

There are no secondary schools in Abercorn; the nearest government secondary schools are Eidsvold State School in Eidsvold to the south and Monto State High School in Monto to the north.

== Attraction ==
Abercorn is the gateway to Wuruma Dam used for water sports and fishing.
