= Langley, Queensland =

Langley
- Suburb
- Interactive map of Langley
- Coordinates: 25.1136°S 151.2511°E
- Country: Australia
- State: Queensland
- LGA: North Burnett Region
- Location: 37.8 km (23.5 mi) SSE of Monto; 41.7 km (25.9 mi) NNE of Eidsvold; 115 km (71 mi) NW of Gayndah; 158 km (98 mi) WSW of Bundaberg; 447 km (278 mi) NW of Brisbane

Government
  - State electorate: Callide
  - Federal division: Flynn

Area
  - Total: 46.3 km^{2} (17.9 sq mi)
- Elevation: 200–240 m (660–790 ft)
- Time zone: UTC+10:00 (AEST)
- Postcode: 4630
Suburbs around Langley
Tellebang	Tellebang	Tellebang
Kapaldo	Langley	Yarrol
Abercorn	Yarrol	Yarrol

Langley is a rural locality in the North Burnett Region, Queensland, Australia. There is no census data for Langley; it is included with neighbouring Tellebang which had a combined population of 60 in the 2021 census.

== Geography ==
The Burnett River bounds the locality to the south and east.

The Burnett Highway enters the locality from the north (Tellebang) and exits to the south-west (Abercorn). Splinter Creek runs roughly parallel and east of the highway, both entering from Tellebang and exiting to Abercorn.

Gin Gin–Mount Perry–Monto Road runs through from south-east to north.

The terrain ranges from 200 to 240 metres (660 to 790 ft) above sea level. The predominant land use is grazing on native vegetation with a small amount of irrigated crop growing near the creek and river.

== History ==
Langley Flat Provisional School opened in 1927, becoming Langley Flat State School in 1927. It closed temporarily on two occasions before finally closing in 1947. It was on the corner of the Burnett Highway and Cooks Road (25.0963°S 151.2277°E) with Splinter Creek to the east.

== Education ==
There are no schools in Langley. The nearest government primary school is Abercorn State School in neighbouring Abercorn to the south-west. The nearest government secondary schools are Eidsvold State School in Eidsvold to the south and Monto State High School in Monto to the north.

== Amenities ==
There is a camping reserve on the Burnett Highway (25.1043°S 151.2232°E).
