= Eidsvold West, Queensland =

Eidsvold West
- Suburb
- Interactive map of Eidsvold West
- Coordinates: 25.3761°S 150.69°E
- Country: Australia
- State: Queensland
- LGA: North Burnett Region
- Location: 52.0 km (32.3 mi) W of Eidsvold; 125 km (78 mi) WNW of Gayndah; 232 km (144 mi) WSW of Bundaberg; 466 km (290 mi) NW of Brisbane

Government
  - State electorate: Callide
  - Federal division: Flynn

Area
  - Total: 2,779.0 km^{2} (1,073.0 sq mi)

Population
  - Total: 85 (2021 census)
  - Density: 0.03059/km^{2} (0.0792/sq mi)
- Time zone: UTC+10:00 (AEST)
- Postcode: 4627
Suburbs around Eidsvold West
Camboon	Rawbelle	Wuruma Dam
Cracow	Eidsvold West	Eidsvold
Cockatoo; Sujeewong	Cheltenham	Coonambula; Dykehead

Eidsvold West is a rural locality in the North Burnett Region, Queensland, Australia. In the 2021 census, Eidsvold West had a population of 85 people.

== Geography ==
As the name suggests, the locality is west of the town of Eidsvold.

There are two mountains in the south-east of the locality:

- Mount Target (25.4889°S 150.9267°E) 220 metres (720 ft)
- Quaggy Mountain (25.4359°S 150.7068°E) 493 metres (1,617 ft)

The Eidsvold–Theodore Road (State Route 73) runs through the locality from east (Eidsvold) to west (Cracow).

There are several state forests with the locality. Apart from these, the land use is almost entirely grazing on native vegetation.

== History ==
The name Eidsvold is the name of the pastoral run operated in 1847-48 by Thomas Archer and David Archer, using the name of the town in Norway where the Norwegian constitution was signed in 1814. Although originally from Scotland, the Archer family immigrated to Norway prior to immigrating to Queensland.

== Demographics ==
In the 2016 census, Eidsvold West had a population of 68 people.

In the 2021 census, Eidsvold West had a population of 85 people.

== Education ==
There are no schools in Eidsvold West. The nearest government primary and secondary school (to Year 12) is Eidsvold State School in Eidsvold to the east. However, the western parts of the locality might be too distant for a daily commute; the alternatives are distance education and boarding school.
