= Burnett Highway =

Highway in Queensland, Australia

Burnett Highway Queensland
- Burnett Highway (green on black)

General information
- Type: Highway
- Length: 542 km (337 mi)
- Route number(s): A3; (Entire Route); Duplexes; State Route 60; (Biloela West – Biloela); State Route 49; (Goomeri – Goomeri South)
- Former route number: National Route 17

Major junctions
- North end: Bruce Highway (Queensland Highway A1), Gracemere
- Leichhardt Highway (State Highway A5); Dawson Highway (State Route 60); Isis Highway (State Route 52); Wide Bay Highway (State Route 49); Bunya Highway (State Route 49)
- South end: D'Aguilar Highway (State Highway A3 / State Route 96), Nanango

Location(s)
- Major settlements: Mt. Morgan, Dululu, Biloela, Monto, Eidsvold, Mundubbera, Gayndah, Ban Ban Springs, Goomeri

Highway system
- Highways in Australia; National Highway • Freeways in Australia; Highways in Queensland

The Burnett Highway is an inland rural highway located in Queensland, Australia. The highway runs from its junction with the Bruce Highway at Gracemere, just south of Rockhampton, to the D'Aguilar Highway in Nanango. Its length is approximately 542 kilometres. The highway takes its name from the Burnett River, which it crosses in Gayndah. The Burnett Highway provides the most direct link between the northern end of the New England Highway (at Yarraman, 21 kilometres (13 mi) south of Nanango) and Rockhampton. It is designated as a State Strategic Road (part of Australia’s Country Way) by the Queensland Government.

== State-controlled road ==
Burnett Highway is a state-controlled regional road, most of which is rated as "state-strategic". It is defined in six sections, as follows:

- Number 41A, Nanango to Goomeri, state-strategic
- Number 41B, Goomeri to Gayndah, state-strategic
- Number 41C, Gayndah to Monto, state-strategic
- Number 41D, Monto to Biloela, state-strategic
- Number 41E, Biloela to Mount Morgan, regional and state-strategic
- Number 41F, Mount Morgan to Rockhampton, regional

== History ==
In January 2013, Cyclone Oswald caused flood damage to the road and a partial closure between Bouldercombe and Mount Morgan, which took longer than a year to repair.

== Roads of Strategic Importance upgrade ==
The Roads of Strategic Importance initiative, last updated in March 2022, includes the following project for the Burnett Highway.

=== Intersection upgrade ===
A project to upgrade the intersection of the Burnett Highway with Gayndah-Mount Perry Road and Wetherton Road, at an estimated cost of $875,000, is expected to be completed in late 2022.

== Other upgrades ==
=== Replace bridges ===
A project to replace the bridge over Three Moon Creek, at a cost of $18 million, was completed in August 2021.

A project to replace the bridge over North Kariboe Creek, at a cost of $7.2 million, was completed in September 2021.

=== Strengthen and widen bridge ===
A project to strengthen and widen the bridge over Callide Creek, at a cost of $3.9 million, was due for completion in early 2022.

== List of towns on the Burnett Highway ==
From north to south

- Bouldercombe
- Mount Morgan
- Dululu
- Jambin
- Biloela
- Thangool
- Monto
- Eidsvold
- Mundubbera
- Gayndah
- Ban Ban Springs
- Goomeri
- Nanango

== Major intersections ==
LGA	Location	km	mi	Destinations	Notes
Rockhampton	Gracemere	0	0.0	Bruce Highway (Queensland Highway A1) north – Rockhampton / south – Mount Larcom	Northern end of Burnett Highway.
Banana	Dululu	63.0	39.1	Leichhardt Highway (State Route A5) north–west – Westwood / south–west – Wowan	
Banana	Biloela	135.1	83.9	Dawson Highway (State Route 60) west – Banana / east – Calliope	North–western concurrency terminus with Dawson Highway
Banana	Biloela	136.3	84.7	Dawson Highway (State Route 60) west – Banana / east – Calliope	South–eastern concurrency terminus with Dawson Highway
North Burnett	Monto	230	140	Gladstone–Monto Road (State Route 69) – north–east – Many Peaks	
North Burnett	Eidsvold	303	188	Eidsvold–Theodore Road (State Route 73) – south, then west – Theodore	
North Burnett	Mundubbera	338.3	210.2	Mundubbera–Durong Road (State Route 75) – south–west – Durong	
Burnett River		381.3	236.9	Les Baker Bridge	
North Burnett	Ban Ban Springs	408.1	253.6	Isis Highway (State Route 52) north–east – Childers	
Gympie	Goomeri	482.3	299.7	Wide Bay Highway (State Route 49) east – Gympie	Northern concurrency terminus with State Route 49
Gympie	Goomeri	484.1	300.8	Bunya Highway (State Route 49) west – Murgon	Southern concurrency terminus with State Route 49
South Burnett	Nanango	542.3	337.0	D'Aguilar Highway (State Route A3) south – Yarraman / (State Route 96) north–west – Kingaroy	Southern end of Burnett Highway.
1.000 mi = 1.609 km; 1.000 km = 0.621 mi: Concurrency terminus

== Intersecting state-controlled roads ==
In addition to the Bunya, Wide Bay, Isis, Dawson and Leichhardt Highways, the following state-controlled roads, from south to north, intersect with the Burnett Highway:

- Kingaroy–Barkers Creek Road
- Murgon–Barambah Road
- Kilcoy–Murgon Road
- Kilkivan–Tansey Road
- Murgon–Gayndah Road
- Gayndah–Mount Perry Road
- Mundubbera–Durong Road
- Eidsvold–Theodore Road
- Wuruma Dam Road
- Monto–Mount Perry Road
- Gladstone–Monto Road
- Cania Dam Road
- Gavial–Gracemere Road

=== Murgon–Barambah Road ===
Murgon–Barambah Road
- Location: Kilcoy–Murgon Road, Murgon to Burnett Highway, Barambah
- Length: 14.1 km (8.8 mi)

Murgon–Barambah Road is a state-controlled regional road (number 437), rated as a local road of regional significance (LRRS). It runs from Kilcoy–Murgon Road in Murgon to the Burnett Highway in Barambah, a distance of 14.1 kilometres (8.8 mi). It does not intersect with any state-controlled roads.

=== Wuruma Dam Road ===
Wuruma Dam Road
- Location: Burnett Highway, Cynthia to Wuruma Dam Campground, Wuruma Dam
- Length: 28.8 km (17.9 mi)

Wuruma Dam Road is a state-controlled district road (number 4511), rated as a local road of regional significance (LRRS). It runs from the Burnett Highway in Cynthia to the Wuruma Dam Campground in the locality of Wuruma Dam, a distance of 28.8 kilometres (17.9 mi). It does not intersect with any state-controlled roads.

=== Cania Dam Road ===
Cania Dam Road
- Location: Burnett Highway, Moonford to Cania Dam, Cania
- Length: 24 km (15 mi)

Cania Dam Road is a state-controlled district road (number 4715), rated as a local road of regional significance (LRRS). It runs from the Burnett Highway in Moonford to Cania Dam in the locality of Cania, a distance of 24 kilometres (15 mi). It does not intersect with any state-controlled roads.

=== Gavial–Gracemere Road ===
Gavial–Gracemere Road
- Location: Bruce Highway, Midgee to Capricorn Highway, Gracemere
- Length: 10.8 km (6.7 mi)

Gavial–Gracemere Road is a state-controlled district road (number 450). It runs from the Bruce Highway in Midgee to the Capricorn Highway in Gracemere, a distance of 10.8 kilometres (6.7 mi). It crosses the Burnett Highway in Bouldercombe.

A project to widen part of this road to four lanes was completed in April 2023.

== Gallery ==
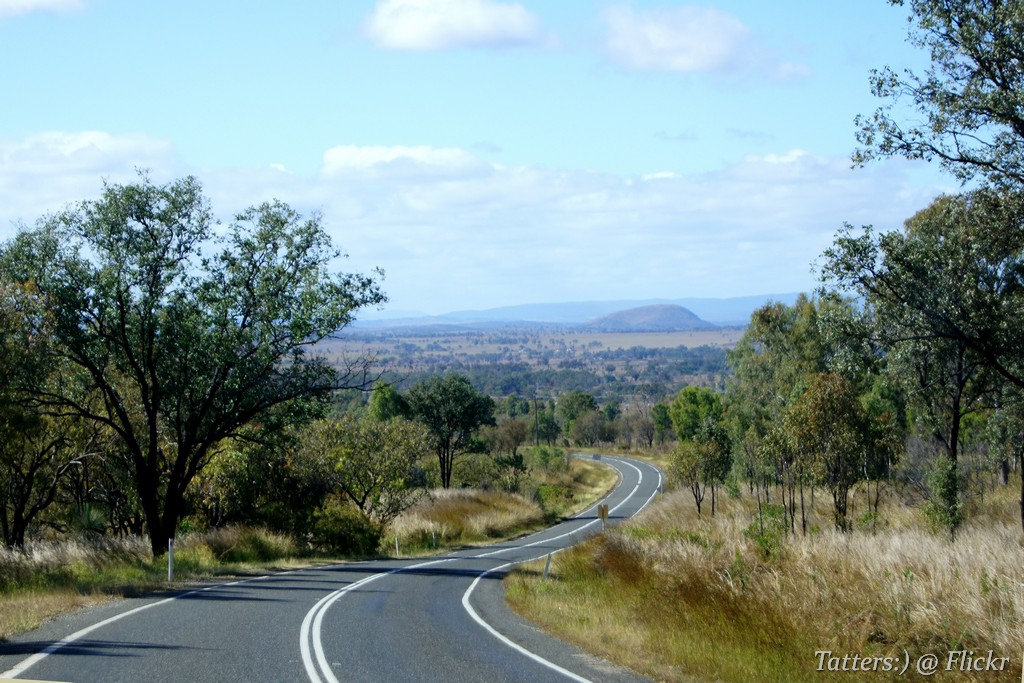
Burnett Highway near Binjour (NW of Gayndah)

== See also ==
- Highways in Australia
- List of highways in Queensland
- List of road routes in Queensland
