= Gin Gin–Mount Perry–Monto Road =

Road in Queensland, Australia

Gin Gin–Mount Perry–Monto Road Queensland

General information
- Type: Rural road
- Length: 109.4 km (68 mi)
- Route number(s): State Route 12

Major junctions
- East end: Bruce Highway Gin Gin
- Gayndah–Mount Perry Road
- West end: Burnett Highway Langley

Location(s)
- Major settlements: Mount Perry

Gin Gin–Mount Perry–Monto Road is a continuous 109.4 kilometres (68.0 mi) road route in the Bundaberg and North Burnett regions of Queensland, Australia. It has two official names, Gin Gin–Mount Perry Road and Monto–Mount Perry Road. The entire route is signed as State Route 12.

Gin Gin–Mount Perry Road (number 474) is a state-controlled district road rated as a local road of regional significance (LRRS) and Monto–Mount Perry Road (number 476) is also a state-controlled district road rated as LRRS.

== Route description ==
The road commences at an intersection with the Bruce Highway (A1) in Gin Gin. It runs generally south-west through the localities of Moolboolaman, New Moonta, Boolboonda and Wonbah before turning south to Mount Perry. It turns south-east where it enters Mount Perry as Heusman Street before turning south-west and exiting as Annie Street. Heusman Street continues south-east and then turns south as Gayndah-Mount Perry Road. (see below)

The road continues generally south-west until it reaches Mungy where it turns north-west to Yarrol and then west to Langley, where it ends at an intersection with the Burnett Highway (A3). This intersection is 34.3 kilometres (21.3 mi) south-east of the Monto CBD.

== History ==
Pastoral leases were taken up in the Fraser Coast Region from 1843 and European settlement of what is now Gin Gin began in 1848. In 1887, 22,000 acres (8,900 ha) of land were resumed from the Gin Gin pastoral run for the establishment of small farms. Further west, 32,000 acres (13,000 ha) were resumed from Moolboolaman. The land was offered for selection on 17 April 1887. The opening of new farms led to the development of roads to the west of Gin Gin.

Pastoral leases were taken up in the Mount Perry district from 1849, and copper was discovered in 1869. This led to the need for a road to transport mining product to Bundaberg, and also requests for a railway line. The road was completed quickly, but a railway was not approved until 1877 and only arrived in 1884. Meanwhile, further road improvements had been undertaken.

Europeans settled in the Monto area from the 1840s, maintaining large pastoral holdings. Gold was discovered in the 1870s, and in 1881 the first school opened. When gold reserves dwindled the activities of logging and farming became predominant. One such farming area was to the south-east, encompassing Mulgildie, Langley and other localities. A road was built to Langley and eventually extended to Mount Perry.

== Upgrade ==
=== Progressive sealing ===
A project to progressively seal three sections of the road, at a cost of $26.6 million, was under construction in April 2022.

== Gayndah–Mount Perry Road ==
Gayndah–Mount Perry Road
- Location: Burnett Highway, Gayndah to Gin Gin–Mount Perry–Monto Road, Mount Perry
- Length: 55.6 km (34.5 mi)

Gayndah-Mount Perry Road (number 475) is a state-controlled district road rated as a local road of regional significance (LRRS). It runs from the Burnett Highway, about 14 kilometres (8.7 mi) east of Gayndah, to Gin Gin–Mount Perry–Monto Road in Mount Perry, a distance of 55.6 kilometres (34.5 mi). This road intersects with Mount Steadman Road in Mingo and Gooroolba–Biggenden Road in Byrnestown.

== Major intersections ==
All distances are from Google Maps.

LGA	Location	km	mi	Destinations	Notes
Bundaberg	Gin Gin	0	0.0	Bruce Highway – south – Booyal, Childers / north – Miriam Vale, Benaraby	Eastern end of Gin Gin–Mount Perry Road (State Route 12); Road continues south-west.
North Burnett	Mount Perry	50.5	31.4	Gayndah-Mount Perry Road – south – Burnett Highway and Gayndah	Name changes to Monto-Mount Perry Road. Continues south west then north-west.
North Burnett	Langley	109.4	68.0	Burnett Highway – northwest – Monto / southwest – Eidsvold,	Western end of Monto–Mount Perry Road (State Route 12)
1.000 mi = 1.609 km; 1.000 km = 0.621 mi: Route transition

== See also ==
- List of road routes in Queensland
- List of numbered roads in Queensland
- Boolboonda Tunnel
