= Sujeewong, Queensland =

Sujeewong
- Suburb
- Interactive map of Sujeewong
- Coordinates: 25.7325°S 150.5427°E
- Country: Australia
- State: Queensland
- LGA: Western Downs Region
- Location: 215 km (134 mi) NNW of Dalby; 266 km (165 mi) NE of Roma; 297 km (185 mi) NW of Toowoomba; 425 km (264 mi) NW of Brisbane

Government
  - State electorate: Callide
  - Federal division: Maranoa

Area
  - Total: 532.8 km^{2} (205.7 sq mi)

Population
  - Total: 0 (2021 census)
  - Density: 0.0000/km^{2} (0.0000/sq mi)
- Time zone: UTC+10:00 (AEST)
- Postcode: 4413
Suburbs around Sujeewong
Cockatoo	Eidsvold West	Cheltenham
Cockatoo	Sujeewong	Hawkwood
Bungaban	Auburn	Auburn

Sujeewong is a rural locality in the Western Downs Region, Queensland, Australia. In the 2021 census, Sujeewong had "no people or a very low population".

Sujeewong's postcode is 4413.

== Geography ==
The Auburn River enters the locality from the north (Eidsvold West) and exits to the south (Auburn); it is a tributary of the Burrnett River.

There are three state forests in the locality: Ballymore in the north, Sujeewong in the north-east, and Mount Auburn in the south-east.

Apart from the state forests, the land use is grazing on native vegetation.

== History ==
Auburn River State School opened on 3 February 1969. The school was mothballed on 20 February 2007 and officially closed on 5 June 2008. It was located at 11779 Auburn Road (on the south-west corner of Arndts Road, 25.8485°S 150.5685°E).

== Demographics ==
In the 2016 census, Sujeewong had a population of 11 people.

In the 2021 census, Sujeewong had "no people or a very low population".

== Economy ==
There are a number of homesteads in the locality:

- Mount Auburn Outstation (25.7526°S 150.5829°E)
- Sujeewong (25.7213°S 150.5941°E)

== Education ==
There are no schools in Sujeewong nor nearby. The school options are distance education and boarding schools.
