= Kapaldo =

- Town
- Interactive map of Kapaldo
- Coordinates: 25.0392°S 151.1377°E
- Country: Australia
- State: Queensland
- LGA: North Burnett Region
- Location: 22.2 km (13.8 mi) S of Monto; 135 km (84 mi) NW of Gayndah; 197 km (122 mi) W of Bundaberg; 458 km (285 mi) NNW of Brisbane

Government
  - State electorate: Callide
  - Federal division: Flynn

Area
  - Total: 79.6 km^{2} (30.7 sq mi)

Population
  - Total: 41 (2021 census)
  - Density: 0.515/km^{2} (1.334/sq mi)
- Time zone: UTC+10:00 (AEST)
- Postcode: 4630
Localities around Kapaldo
Glenleigh	Selene	Selene
Glenleigh	Kapaldo	Tellebang
Glenleigh	Abercorn	Langley

Kapaldo is a rural town and locality in the North Burnett Region, Queensland, Australia. In the 2021 census, the locality of Kapaldo had a population of 41 people.

== Geography ==
Anyarro is a neighbourhood in the locality (25.0833°S 151.1166°E).

The Mungar Junction to Monto railway line enters the locality from the south (Abercorn) and passes through Anyarro, served by the Anyarro railway station (25.0760°S 151.1241°E) in the south-west of the locality before passing through the town of Kapaldo, being served by Kapaldo railway station (25.0400°S 151.1364°E) and then exiting the locality to the north (Selene). This section of the railway is no longer in use and both stations are now abandoned.

The land use is predominantly grazing on native vegetation.

== History ==
The town derives its name from the Kapaldo railway station, which was named by the Queensland Railways Department on 19 June 1925, based on an Aboriginal word meaning scrubby ground.

Anyarro also takes its name from the Anyarro railway station, which was named by the railways department on 13 June 1925, using an Aboriginal word meaning enough.

Anyarro Provisional School opened in February 1928 and closed in September 1929 due to low student numbers.

Kapaldo State School opened on 1 October 1929 and closed in 1947. It was located on the Anyarro-Kapaldo Road (approx 25.0566°S 151.1327°E).

== Demographics ==
In the 2016 census, the locality of Kapaldo had a population of 43 people.

In the 2021 census, the locality of Kapaldo had a population of 41 people.

== Education ==
There are no schools in Kapaldo. The nearest government primary schools are Abercorn State School in neighbouring Abercorn to the south and Mulgildie State School in Mulgildie to the north. The nearest government secondary school is Monto State High School in Monto to the north.
