= Wuruma Dam, Queensland =

Wuruma Dam
- Suburb
- Interactive map of Wuruma Dam
- Coordinates: 25.14°S 151.0011°E
- Country: Australia
- State: Queensland
- LGA: North Burnett Region
- Location: 37.8 km (23.5 mi) N of Eidsvold; 45.2 km (28.1 mi) SSW of Monto; 116 km (72 mi) NW of Gayndah; 198 km (123 mi) WSW of Bundaberg; 458 km (285 mi) NNW of Brisbane

Government
  - State electorate: Callide
  - Federal division: Flynn

Area
  - Total: 354.5 km^{2} (136.9 sq mi)

Population
  - Total: 34 (2021 census)
  - Density: 0.0959/km^{2} (0.248/sq mi)
- Time zone: UTC+10:00 (AEST)
- Postcode: 4627
Suburbs around Wuruma Dam
Rawbelle	Coominglah Forest	Glenleigh
Eidsvold West	Wuruma Dam	Abercorn
Eidsvold West	Eidsvold	Cynthia; Ceratodus

Wuruma Dam is a rural locality in the North Burnett Region, Queensland, Australia. In the 2021 census, Wuruma Dam had a population of 34 people.

== Geography ==
The Nogo River enters the locality from the north-west, passes through Lake Wuruma and over the spillway of the Wuruma Dam. It then runs east before turning south, where it forms part of the south-eastern boundary. Lake Wuruma is contained entirely within the locality.

Wuruma Dam has the following mountains:

- Arthurs Knob (25.0498°S 150.9336°E), rising to 414 metres (1,358 ft) above sea level
- Mount Eagle (25.2358°S 150.9872°E) 391 metres (1,283 ft)

The land use is grazing on native vegetation.

== History ==
Goomaran Creek Provisional School opened on 29 April 1931. In 1932, it became Goomaran State School. It closed on 9 May 1948. Note the spelling of the school's name varies in the sources; it also appears as Gooramam State School. The school was on the southern side of Goomaram Road (approx 25.15223°S 151.04625°E).

== Demographics ==
In the 2016 census, Wuruma Dam had a population of 35 people.

In the 2021 census, Wuruma Dam had a population of 34 people.

== Education ==
There are no schools in Wuruma Dam. The nearest government primary school is Abercorn State School in neighbouring Abercorn to the east. The nearest government secondary schools are Eidsvold State School (to Year 12) in neighbouring Eidsvold to the south and Monto State High School (to Year 12) in Monto to the north-east. However, some students in the locality may be too distant to attend either of these secondary schools; the alternatives are distance education and boarding school.
