= The Glebe Homestead =

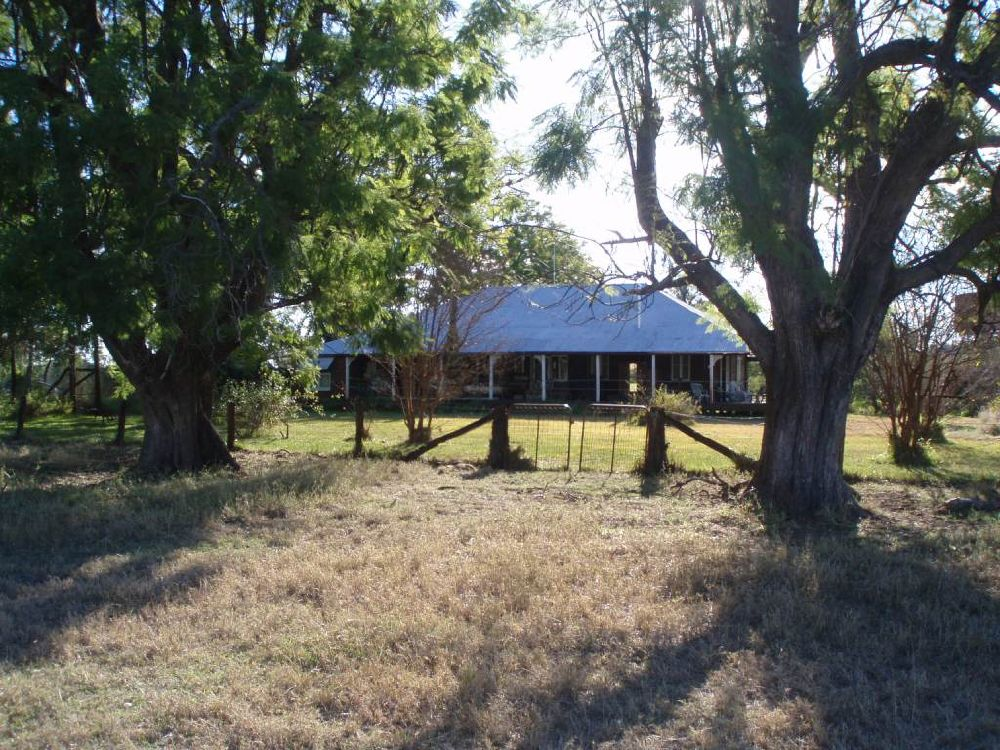
- The Glebe Homestead, 2009

- Location within Queensland Location within Australia
- 25.4888°S 150.0053°E
- Location: Taroom-Cracow Road, Glebe, Shire of Banana, Queensland, Australia

History
- Design period: 1900 - 1914 (early 20th century)
- Built: c. 1920

Site notes
- Architect: Florence Mary Rigby

Queensland Heritage Register
- Official name: The Glebe Homestead, Broadwater
- Type: state heritage (built, landscape)
- Designated: 23 March 2007
- Reference no.: 601774
- Significant period: 1900s-1920s (fabric, historical)
- Significant components: trees/plantings, laundry / wash house, paving, tennis court, residential accommodation - shearers' quarters, residential accommodation - main house, breezeway, yards - livestock, views to, shed - machinery, orchard, garden/grounds

The Glebe Homestead is a heritage-listed homestead at Taroom-Cracow Road, Glebe near Taroom, Shire of Banana, Queensland, Australia. It was designed by Florence Mary Rigby and built c. 1920. It is also known as Broadwater. It was added to the Queensland Heritage Register on 23 March 2007.

== History ==
The Glebe Homestead, overlooking the Dawson River to the northeast of Taroom, was completed c. 1920. It is the second house on the property, erected after the first was destroyed by fire in 1915. It was built by and for the Rigby family, owners of The Glebe from 1900.

European occupation of the Dawson River district followed explorer Ludwig Leichhardt's journey through the area in 1844, during his exploratory journey from Jimbour Homestead to Port Essington. Squatters soon followed, with a licence for Taroom Station issued in 1845. The town of Taroom, named after the station, was surveyed in 1860. Closer settlement commenced in the 1880s, with land resumptions and subdivision under the Crown Lands Act of 1884.

Tenders to lease a pastoral holding known as Broadwater run (later The Glebe) were called in March 1851. It was not until November 1858 that the tender of George Bowman of Richmond was accepted for the 25 square mile run. The lease changed hands several times in the 1860s and 1870s.

By the mid-1880s Broadwater was one of six runs comprising the consolidated run of Cockatoo Creek. No improvements had been made to the property and in 1888 Broadwater, along with three other Cockatoo Creek runs, was resumed for grazing selection. In August 1900 portions 14 and 15 (Grazing Farms 124 & 125) - a combined area of 29 square miles, formerly Broadwater run and with frontages to the Dawson River and Cockatoo Creek - were selected by George Beaumont Rigby, and named The Glebe. The property had very thick coolibah on the black soil river and creek flats, and dense brigalow, sandalwood and mulga scrub elsewhere.

Rigby arrived in Taroom from England probably in the late 1870s. He found employment on Carrabah (formerly Taroom) run, where he formed a partnership with the manager, GC Langhorne, to acquire the 90,000 acre run from the Queensland National Bank in 1881. Whilst living at Carrabah, Rigby married Marian Frances Crawford in 1884 and five sons and one daughter were born to them. The partnership between Langhorne and Rigby dissolved in 1900 and in August of that year Rigby and his wife took up The Glebe. Rigby later acquired several adjoining blocks: an occupation license for Mountain Block (10 square miles) in 1907; a lease on Springvale (16 square miles) in 1921; and a lease on Price Creek, a 14 square mile block east of Springvale, by 1925.

By September 1901 the Rigby family were living in a tent on The Glebe. By 1908 the selection had been improved with a residence, woolshed (the Rigbys ran sheep in conjunction with cattle until the late 1940s) and cultivated paddocks; by October 1915 improvements included an iron-roofed residence, a kitchen garden, woolshed, machinery, fencing and cultivation. Soon after this survey, in December 1915, the Rigby residence was destroyed by fire and it took some years for the family for construct another home, which they built themselves from materials available on the property and using traditional construction techniques. Work on cutting and milling timber for the new house commenced almost immediately, but construction was slow. This was the time of the Great War in Europe. Two of the Rigby sons were serving overseas in the armed forces; there was a war-generated shortage of building materials; the property had to be run; and much time and energy was being invested in eradicating the prickly pear that infested The Glebe and other properties in the Taroom district prior to the introduction of cactoblastis larvae in the 1920s. During this period (1916–1919) the family resided in what is now known as the machinery shed, with its slab walls and bark roof overlaid with sheets of corrugated iron.

By early June 1921, when an appraisal of rent was made by the Lands Department, The Glebe homestead comprised a new house of 7 rooms, services laid on from 5,000 gallon tank supplied from river, outbuildings etc. Descendants understand that the new house was designed by Florence Mary Rigby - George and Marion's only daughter - with the main bedroom and living room separated from the rest of the house by a wide breezeway, which, though housed under the same roof, was open at both ends.

A 1923 photograph was taken at The Glebe to commemorate a visit by the then Governor of Queensland, Sir Matthew Nathan. This and other photographs of the period 1920s to 1940s show the house largely unchanged, with the exception of a small bedroom later enclosed at the southwest corner of the verandah. By at least the 1930s, a Chinese market gardener had established a vegetable garden on land between the house and the river, but this is not known to have survived the 1940s. By the late 1930s an air-strip had been cleared just south of the house.

George Beaumont Rigby died in 1931 and Marion Rigby in 1937. George had been very active in district affairs. He was an auditor of the Taroom District Hospital (established 1896), a position he held until his death, and was instrumental in establishing the Taroom Agricultural and Pastoral Society in the late 1890s. He was also a long-serving member of the Taroom Divisional Board (later Taroom Shire Council).

The property remained in the Rigby family for over a century, until resumed for the proposed Nathan Dam early in the 21st century. The woolshed was destroyed by fire in 1997.

== Description ==
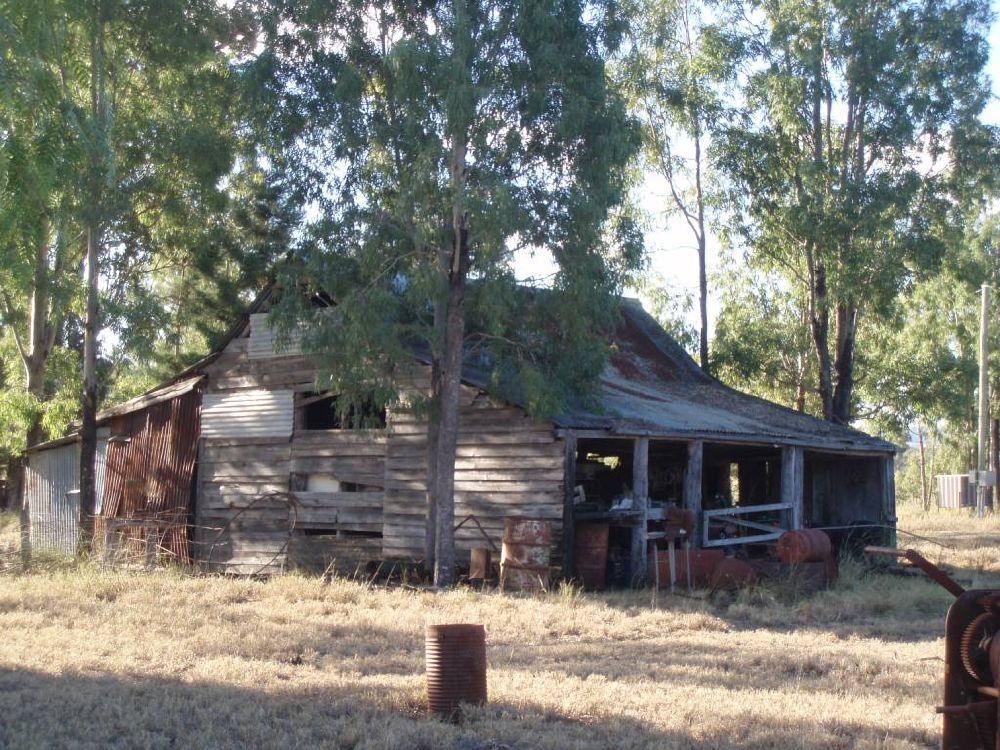
Machinery shed, 2009

The Glebe Homestead is located approximately 40 kilometres (25 mi) northeast of Taroom, on a low sandy ridge overlooking the Dawson River to the northwest.

The homestead complex comprises a single-storeyed timber residence with early garden, tennis court and orchard; a two-storeyed shearers' quarters; a machinery shed; a c. 1960s cottage clad with fibrous cement (not considered to be of heritage significance); and cattle yards to the south of the timber residence.

=== Timber residence and garden ===
The residence is constructed of horizontal drop slabs of sawn Moreton Bay ash (Eucalyptus tessellaris) housed in recessed sections of vertical timber members. The whole is elevated on low timber stumps, and the charred remains of earlier stumps are extant beneath the house. The original layout of the residence is evident: four rooms (two on each side of a narrow passageway which opens off the southwest side of the building) separated by a wide breezeway from two larger rooms to the northeast, with wide verandahs to the southeast and northeast. A bungalow-style hipped roof clad with corrugated iron sheets comes down low over the verandahs, where it is supported on regularly spaced squared timber posts with later cast iron brackets. Several pairs of French doors open onto the verandahs from the interior. On the northwest side of the house is a small corrugated- iron gable roof over the northwest timber entrance steps to the breezeway. This breezeway is now enclosed with panels of doors and windows at either end. A later bathroom has been added to the northwest corner of the house, and a bedroom to the southwest corner, enclosing an existing verandah space.

Internally much of the timber partitioning is lined with hessian and papered, and other timber walls are oiled with a mixture of linseed oil and turpentine. The timber ceilings have been covered in some places with fibrous cement sheeting. A large fireplace in the living/dining room has a timber surround.

The house retains an extensive garden area, with early plantings including a plumbago hedge on the northeastern fence, a jasmine hedge along the northwestern fence, a climbing rose (Senica alba) near the northwest entrance to the house, and several early varieties of bougainvillea and crepe myrtle (Lagerstroemia sp.). Just outside the fenced garden are three jacaranda trees (Jacaranda mimosifolia), two of which define what was once the main gate into the garden. To the southwest of the garden is an unsealed tennis court, which has a high fence of wire mesh supported by timber saplings. Remnants of an early orchard adjoin the northeastern garden fence. To the west of the garden is a row of early pepper trees (Macropiper excelsum).

=== Outbuildings ===
To the southwest, separated from the main residence by an area of cement-set stone paving, is a small timber framed and timber-clad laundry. Attached to this is a timber-framed, fibrous-cement sheeted shed.

Further to the southwest, beyond the house yard, is a machinery shed that pre-dates the house. This is partially of slab construction and retains an early galvanised-iron gabled roof insulated with bark lining. It has skillion-roofed extensions along each side. Nearby is the former two-storeyed shearers' quarters, a gable-roofed, timber- framed building clad with sections of timber board and sheets of corrugated iron.

== Heritage listing ==
The Glebe Homestead was listed on the Queensland Heritage Register on 23 March 2007 having satisfied the following criteria.

The place is important in demonstrating the evolution or pattern of Queensland's history.

The Glebe Homestead, completed by c. 1920, is important in illustrating the pattern of settlement in the Taroom district, being associated with the pattern of land resumption in the district in late 19th and early 20th centuries. The manner in which the homestead was constructed, over a number of years and from materials recycled or obtained from the property, reflects the impact of the Great War of 1914–1918, during which many rural communities in Queensland suffered materials and labour shortages, and the additional impact of the widespread prickly pear infestation on properties in the northwest Darling Downs, which created financial strain for many landholders.

The place demonstrates rare, uncommon or endangered aspects of Queensland's cultural heritage.

A machinery shed on the site, which pre-dates the main residence, retains early bark lining beneath a corrugated iron roof, which is a rare surviving example of this form of construction.

The place has potential to yield information that will contribute to an understanding of Queensland's history.

The homestead has the potential to provide the opportunity for further archaeological research, as many of the buildings have survived intact with early machinery and fittings. The remains of an early building, which may be the previous house, are apparent beneath the present main residence.

The place is important in demonstrating the principal characteristics of a particular class of cultural places.

The homestead, which comprises a main residence, garden with mature trees and other early plantings, tennis court and outbuildings, is an intact and working example of an early 20th century pastoral head station, constructed during a period of financial, material and manpower shortages, and is important in illustrating its type. The main residence is important as a late example of sawn timber slab construction and of traditional interior finishes, illustrating how traditional bush construction techniques were sustained in rural Queensland for many decades after initial settlement. The idiosyncratic design illustrates an appreciation of local climate conditions, and the whole reflects the need for self-sufficiency and the shortage of materials and labour during the first world war.

The place is important because of its aesthetic significance.

The main residence, set within a garden of mature trees and other early plantings, and outbuildings have aesthetic significance engendered by the rustic materials and picturesque setting in an open rural landscape.
