= Cockatoo, Queensland =

Cockatoo
- Suburb
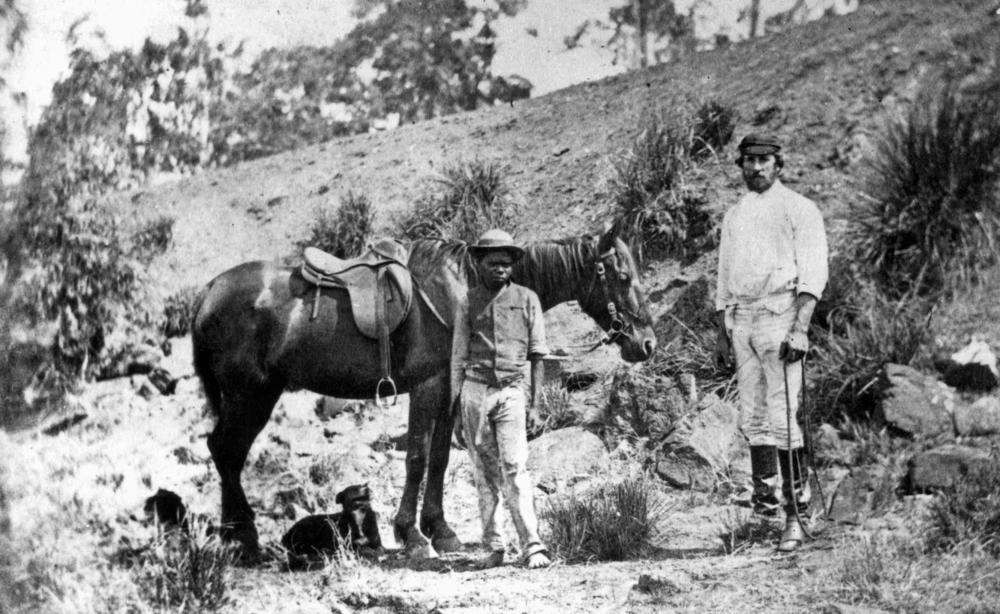
- W B Slade and an aboriginal stable boy on Cockatoo Creek Station, 1866

- Interactive map of Cockatoo
- Coordinates: 25.6844°S 150.2813°E
- Country: Australia
- State: Queensland
- LGA: Shire of Banana
- Location: 56.2 km (34.9 mi) E of Taroom; 252 km (157 mi) SSE of Biloela; 472 km (293 mi) NW of Brisbane

Government
  - State electorate: Callide
  - Federal division: Flynn

Area
  - Total: 792.5 km^{2} (306.0 sq mi)

Population
  - Total: 41 (2021 census)
  - Density: 0.0517/km^{2} (0.1340/sq mi)
- Time zone: UTC+10:00 (AEST)
- Postcode: 4419
Suburbs around Cockatoo
Glebe	Cracow	Eidsvold West
Taroom	Cockatoo	Sujeewong
Taroom	Bungaban	Sujeewong

Cockatoo is a rural locality in the Shire of Banana, Queensland, Australia. In the 2021 census, Cockatoo had a population of 41 people.

== Geography ==
Cockatoo Creek flows through Cockatoo from east to west, eventually flowing to the Dawson River at 25.4666°S 150.0333°E.

== History ==
Cockatoo Provisional School was originally operated by a governess in a school provided by local parents unil the Queensland Government provided a teacher from 1958. This school closed in 1963.

Cockatoo State School opened on 23 January 1984 and closed on 31 December 2000. It was located in the south of Cockatoo, now within neighbouring Bungaban at 1473 Ponty Pool Road (25.7901°S 150.2604°E).

== Demographics ==
In the 2011 census, the population of Cockatoo was not separately reported but was included within neighbouring Taroom which had a combined population of 873 people.

In the 2016 census, Cockatoo had a population of 36 people.

In the 2021 census, Cockatoo had a population of 41 people.

== Education ==
There are no schools in Cockatoo. The nearest government school is Taroom State School in Taroom to the west which is a primary and secondary school to Year 10. There are no nearby secondary schools to Year 12; distance education and boarding school are the alternatives.

== Notable people ==
- Journalist Florence Eliza Lord was born in Cockatoo
