= Glebe, Queensland =

Glebe
- Suburb
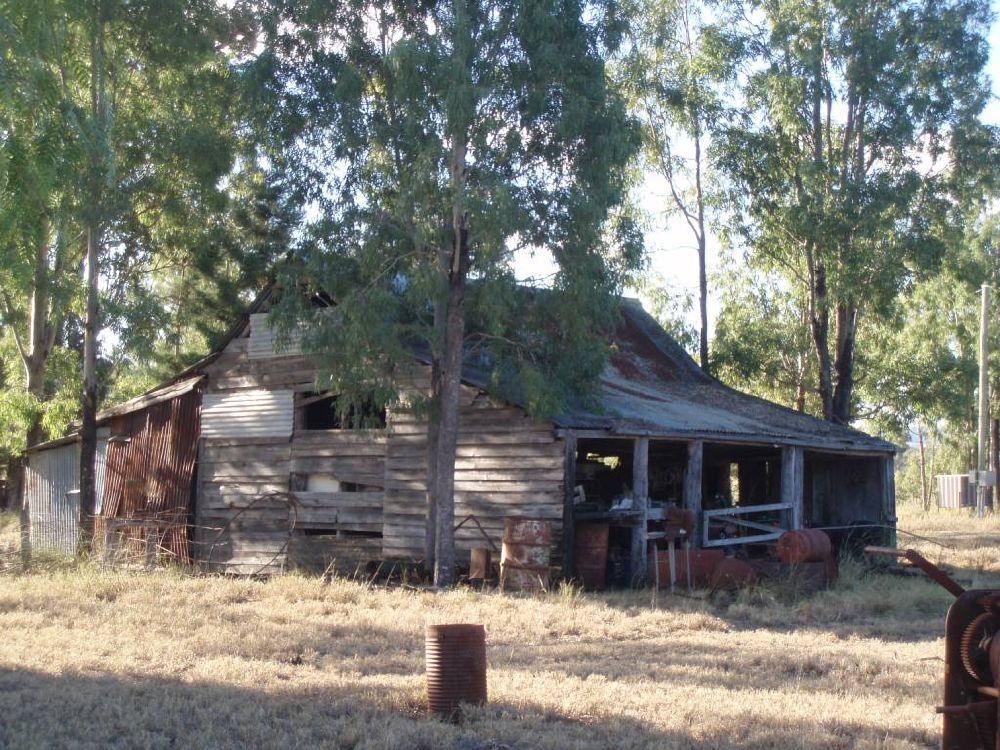
- Machinery Shed at The Glebe Homestead, 2009

- Interactive map of Glebe
- Coordinates: 25.5383°S 150.1675°E
- Country: Australia
- State: Queensland
- LGA: Shire of Banana
- Location: 41.1 km (25.5 mi) E of Taroom; 143 km (89 mi) N of Miles; 240 km (150 mi) SSW of Biloela; 320 km (200 mi) W of Bundaberg; 481 km (299 mi) NW of Brisbane

Government
  - State electorate: Callide
  - Federal division: Flynn

Area
  - Total: 646.2 km^{2} (249.5 sq mi)

Population
  - Total: 10 (2021 census)
  - Density: 0.015/km^{2} (0.040/sq mi)
- Time zone: UTC+10:00 (AEST)
- Postcode: 4419
Suburbs around Glebe
Spring Creek	Cracow	Cracow
Spring Creek	Glebe	Cockatoo
Taroom	Cockatoo	Cockatoo

Glebe is a rural locality in the Shire of Banana, Queensland, Australia. In the 2021 census, Glebe had a population of 10 people.

== Geography ==
The locality is bounded to the north-west by the Dawson River. The Glebe Weir (25.4646°S 150.0349°E) impounds the river to the south-west.

Glebe Mountain is on the western boundary of the locality (25.5625°S 150.0266°E), rising to 327 metres (1,073 ft) above sea level.

Nathan Gorge is on the northern boundary of the locality (25.4487°S 150.1555°E) with an elevation of 170 metres (560 ft) above sea level.

The predominant land use is grazing on native vegetation. There is a small amount of crop growing in the north-west of the locality near the Dawson River with irrigated crops near the weir.

== Demographics ==
In the 2016 census, Glebe had a population of 24 people.

In the 2021 census, Glebe had a population of 10 people.

== Heritage listings ==
Glebe has a number of heritage-listed sites, including:

- The Glebe Homestead, Taroom-Cracow Road (25.4888°S 150.0053°E)

== Education ==
There are no schools in Glebe. The nearest government school is Taroom State School (Prep to Year 10) in neighbouring Taroom to the south-west. There are no nearby schools providing education to Year 12; the alternatives are distance education and boarding school.
