= Florence Eliza Lord =

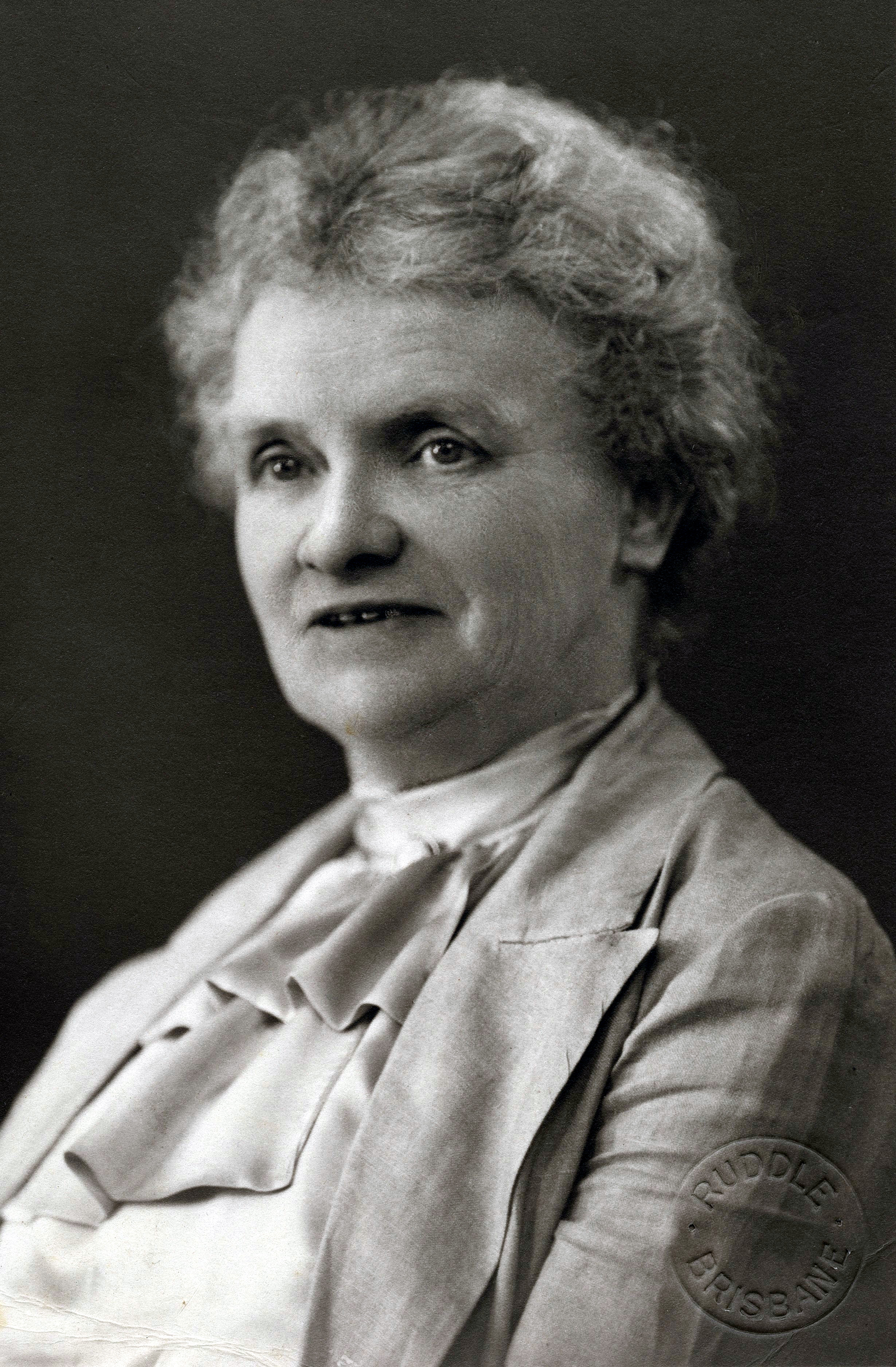
Florence Eliza Lord

Florence Eliza Lord (1879–1942) was a journalist in Brisbane, Queensland, Australia. She is best known for her long-running series of articles on Brisbane's Historic Homes in The Queenslander newspaper. She sometimes published under the pseudonym of Wilga.

== Early life ==
Florence Eliza Lord was born on 22 July 1879 in Cockatoo, Queensland, the daughter of William Lord, a grazier, and his wife Marianne (née McLean). After the death of her father in 1903, Florence and her mother relocated to Brisbane, where Florence worked as a governess and a lady's companion.

== Journalism ==
During the 1920s and 1930s, Florence Lord published sketches and articles on history and travel in the Brisbane Courier (later The Courier-Mail) and The Queenslander newspapers.

Florence Lord was a member of the Royal Historical Society of Queensland, the Lyceum Club and the Queensland Town and Country Club. Being socially well-connected, she was able to gain access to many of Brisbane's finest homes to produce her newspaper series on Brisbane's Historical Homes.

== Later life ==
In the late 1930s she retired to Melbourne and in 1937 was living in Collingwood.

Florence Lord died on 27 June 1942 at a private hospital in Camberwell, Victoria.
