= Cracow, Queensland =

Cracow
- Town
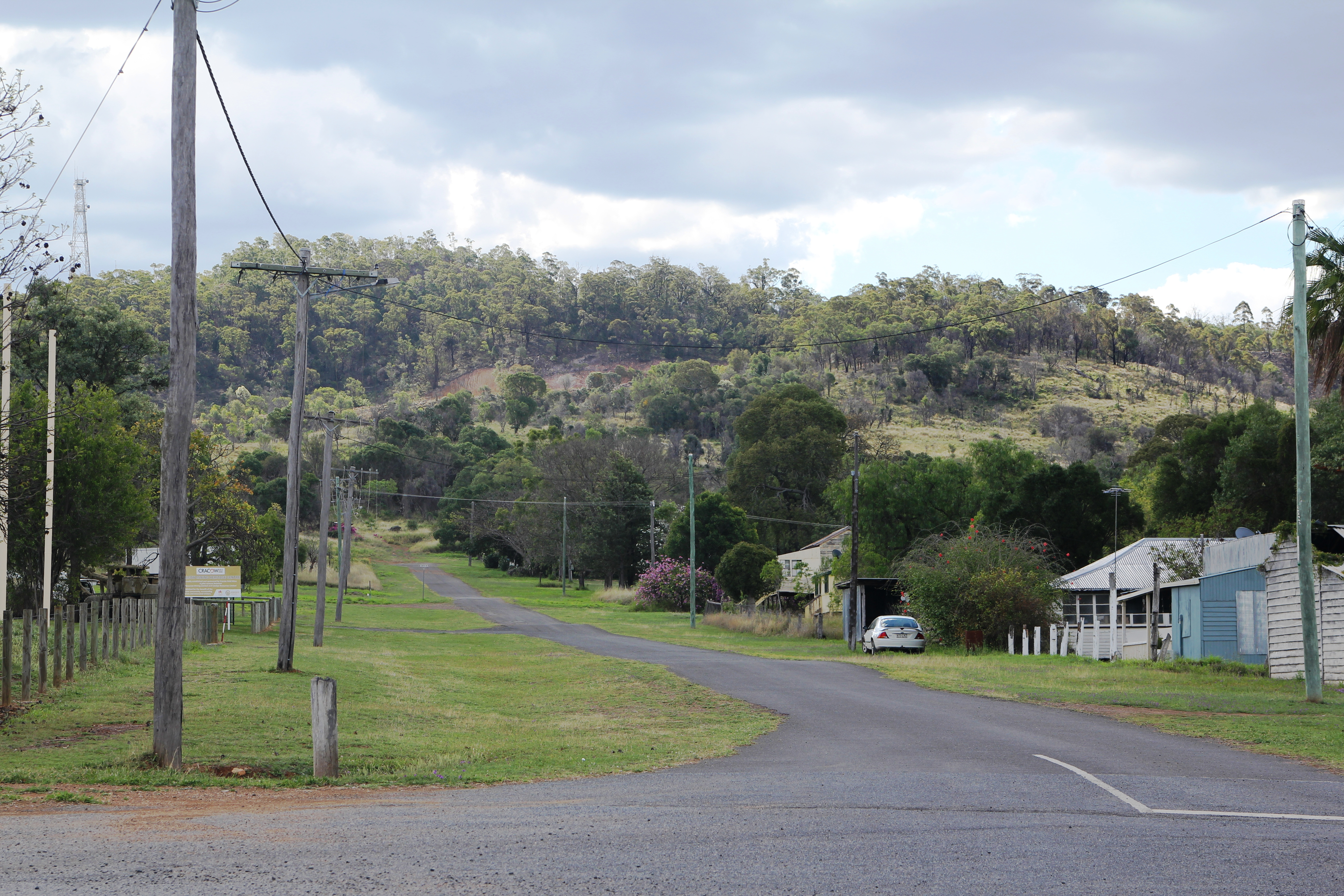
- Third Avenue, Cracow, 2014

- Interactive map of Cracow
- Coordinates: 25.2967°S 150.3047°E
- Country: Australia
- State: Queensland
- LGA: Shire of Banana
- Location: 49.8 km (30.9 mi) SSE of Theodore; 133 km (83 mi) SSE of Taroom; 155 km (96 mi) S of Biloela; 270 km (170 mi) S of Rockhampton; 494 km (307 mi) NW of Brisbane
- Established: 1931

Government
  - State electorate: Callide
  - Federal division: Flynn

Area
  - Total: 721.9 km^{2} (278.7 sq mi)

Population
  - Total: 114 (2021 census)
  - Density: 0.1579/km^{2} (0.4090/sq mi)
- Time zone: UTC+10:00 (AEST)
- Postcode: 4719
Localities around Cracow
Isla	Camboon	Eidsvold West
Spring Creek	Cracow	Eidsvold West
Glebe	Cockatoo	Eidsvold West

Cracow is a rural town and locality in the Shire of Banana, Queensland, Australia. Historically, Cracow is a gold mining town, with some recent mines opening. In the 2021 census, the locality of Cracow had a population of 114 people.

== Geography ==
The town is located on the Eidsvold–Theodore Road, 494 kilometres (307 mi) by road north-west of the state capital, Brisbane.

Cracow has the following mountains:

- Mount Edwards (Mount Bannister) (25.3580°S 150.3403°E) 460 metres (1,510 ft)
- Mount Elvinia (25.3490°S 150.3392°E) 441 metres (1,447 ft)
- Mount Irving (25.2125°S 150.2794°E) 460 metres (1,510 ft)
- Mount Steel (25.2219°S 150.2214°E) 440 metres (1,440 ft)

== History ==
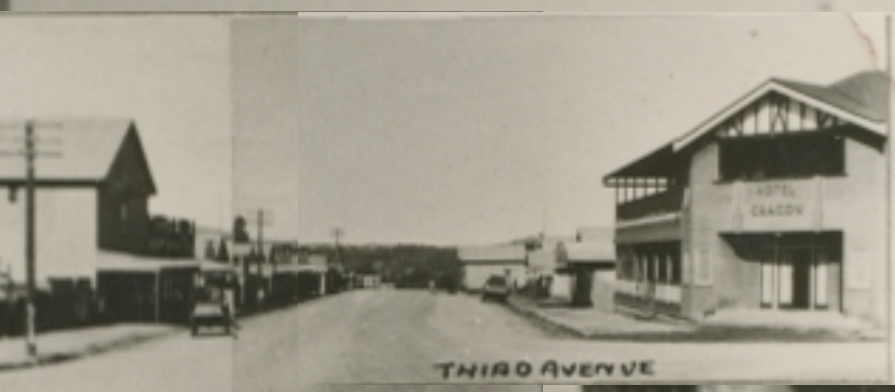
Third Avenue of Cracow, 1961

The town was named after a pastoral run, which was in turn named by pastoralist John Ross, in 1851, for the Polish city of Kraków, which had recently been the centre for a fight for Polish national independence.

Gold was first discovered in Cracow in 1875 by itinerant fossickers and a further discovery of a nugget was made by an Aboriginal stockman, Johnny Nipps in 1916. In 1931, the Golden Plateau mine was established and it operated continuously until 1976. As of 1977, 19,910 kilograms (43,890 lb) of gold had been extracted from the mine.

Cracow Post Office opened on 1 October 1932.

Cracow State School opened on 12 June 1933. It was found to be too small with a few months so it was relocated and extended with an annex. It closed on 12 December 1997. It was at 11-17 Third Avenue (25.2933°S 150.3010°E).

At its gold mining peak, the town included five cafes, barber shop, billiard saloon, two butchers, a picture theatre and a soft drink factory. The closure of the mine led to Cracow becoming almost a ghost town with many deserted houses and shops.

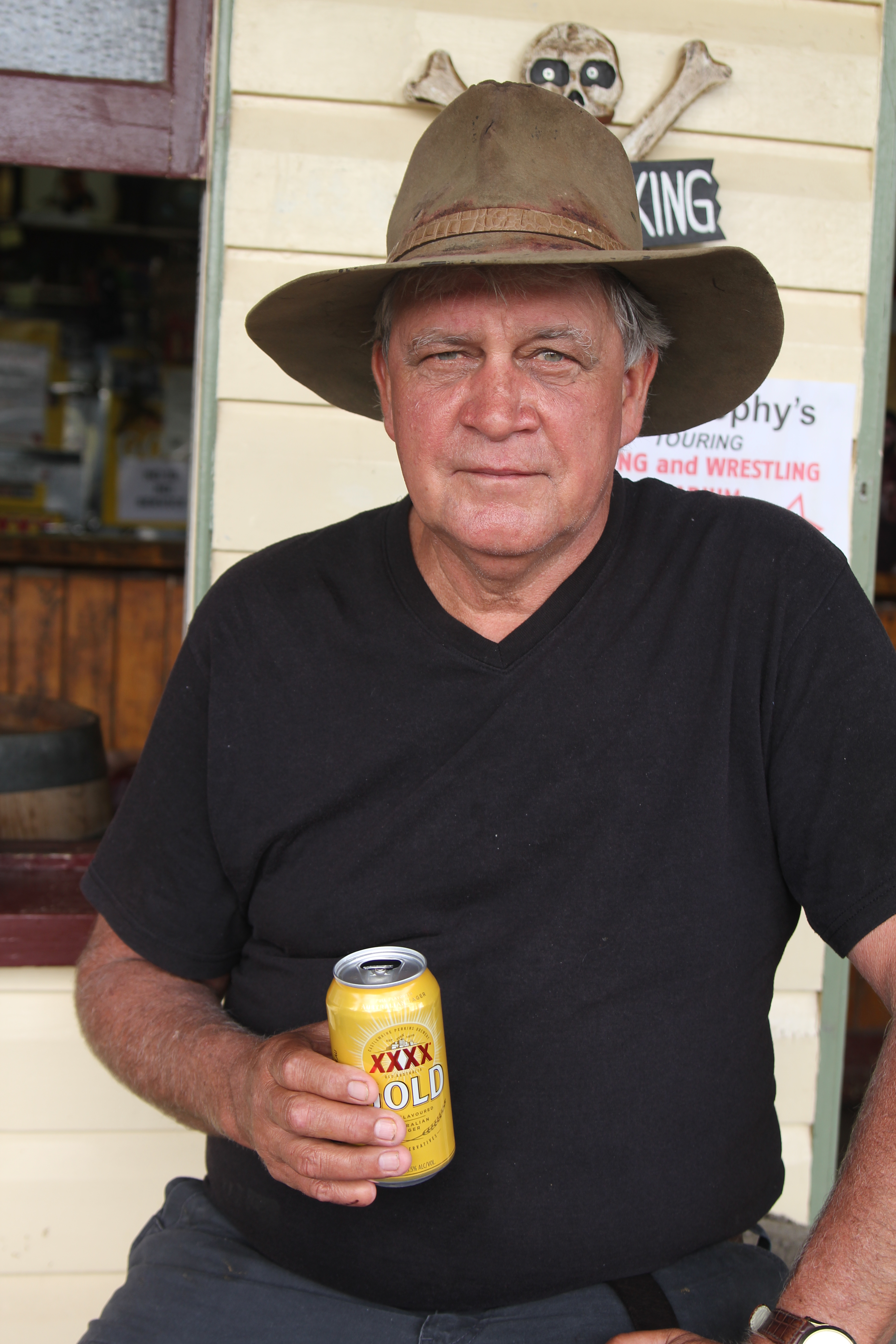
Fred Brophy, former owner of the Cracow Hotel, 2014

Circa 2000, Fred Brophy and wife Sandi purchased the Cracow Hotel. He operated his famous boxing tent as an annual event in Cracow.

In 2004, Newcrest Mining reestablished gold mining in the town, leading to hopes the town may recover. This mine is now operated by Aeris Resources.

The 2019 horror-comedy film Two Heads Creek was filmed on location in Cracow.

== Demographics ==
In the 2011 census, the locality of Cracow and the surrounding area had a population of 196 people.

In the 2016 census, the locality of Cracow had a population of 89 people.

In the 2021 census, the locality of Cracow had a population of 114 people.

== Facilities ==
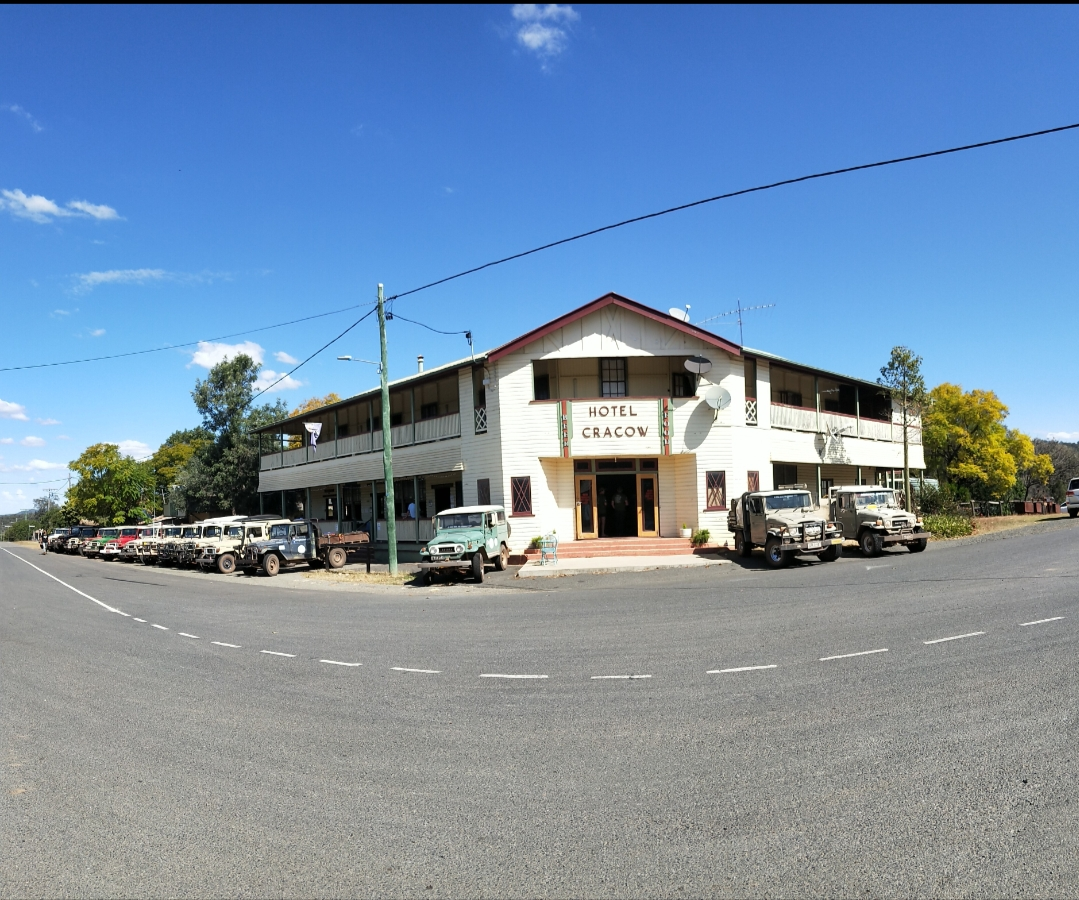
Cracow Hotel, est 1937

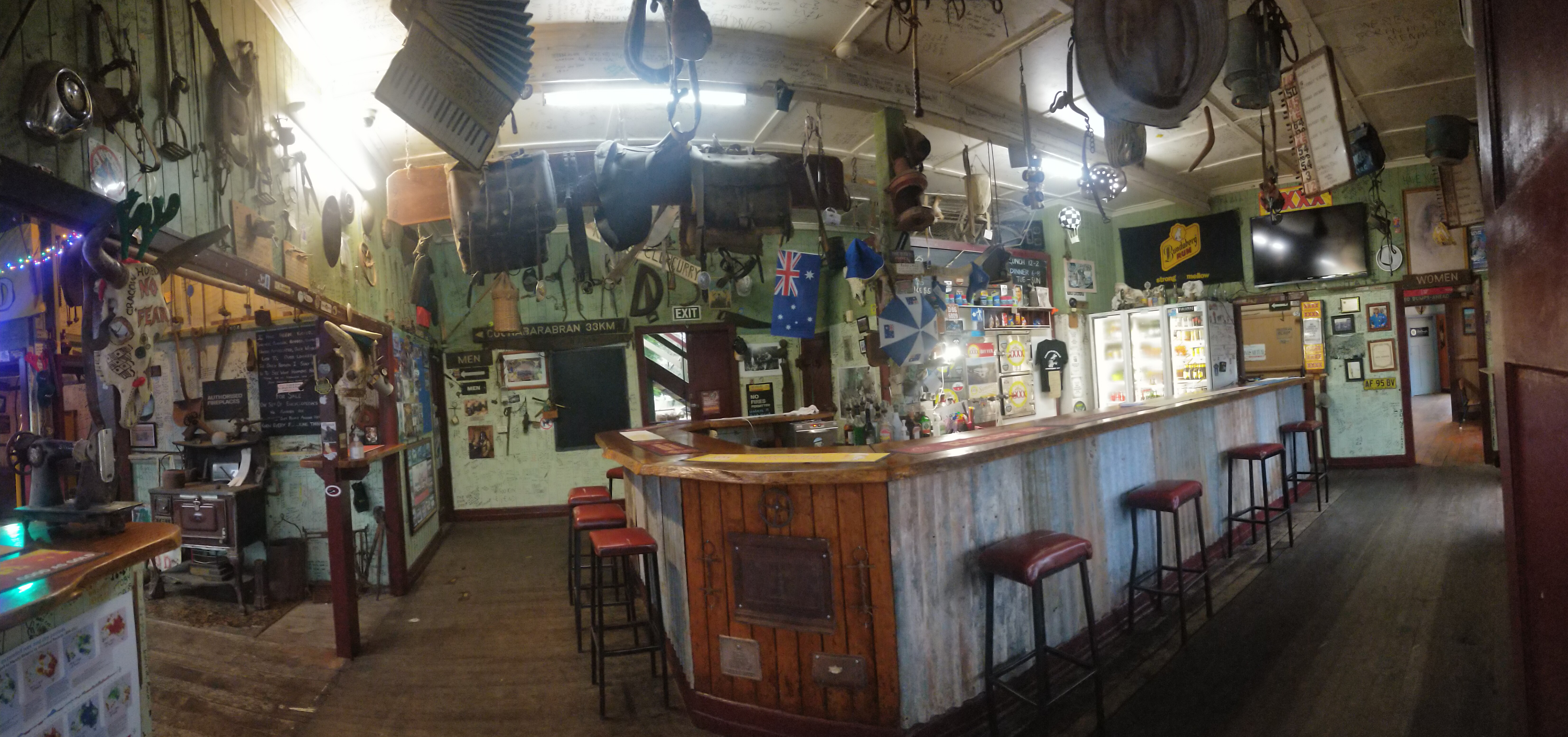
The Cracow Pub Bar, 2022

The Cracow Hotel at 30 Third Avenue (corner Tenth Avenue, 25.2954°S 150.3026°E) is the only remaining business in the township, as it attracts a lot of tourists due to its array of antique and unusual artifacts adorning the ceilings and walls.

The Cracow community centre is at 57-63 Tenth Avenue (25.2953°S 150.3018°E) and is operated by the Banana Shire Council.

There is also a caravan park located at 11 Third Avenue, next to the old court house which has been turned into a mining museum.

== Education ==
There are no schools in Cracow. The nearest government school is Theodore State School in Theodore to the north-west; it provides primary education and secondary education to Year 10. There are no nearby schools providing secondary education to Year 12; the alternatives are distance education and boarding school.
