= Fred Brophy =

Australian tent boxeer

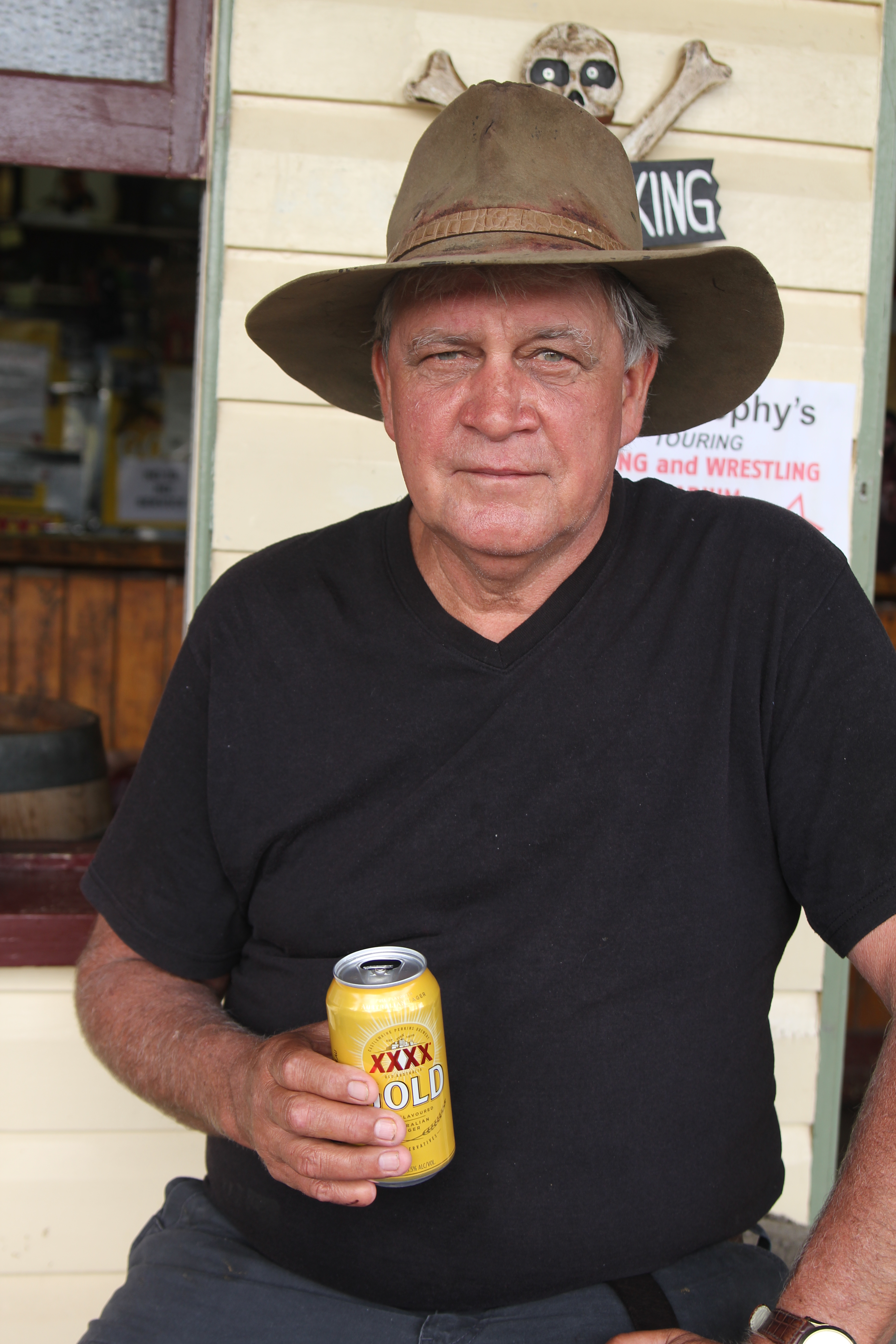
Brophy in 2014

Fred Brophy is an Australian tent boxing promoter who regularly tours around Queensland with the eponymous Fred Brophy's Boxing Troupe.

Brophy organises and then referees the tent boxing bouts between the boxers that travel with the troupe and willing local participants at such events at the Birdsville Races and the Mount Isa Rodeo. Brophy puts the call out to interested local challengers by banging a drum.

== Biography ==
Born in Perth and growing up in Queensland, Brophy is a fourth-generation showman. His father was a sideshow operator while his mother was a trapeze artist. Brophy claims to have been boxing since he was a young as four years old when his father and his uncle toured with their own boxing tents.

As a young man, Brophy served jail time, in both Pentridge and Fremantle Prisons.

== Hall of Fame ==
Brophy was inducted into the Queensland Boxing Hall of Fame in 2009.

== Documentary ==
In 2010, Brophy was the subject of an SBS documentary called Outback Fight Club which detailed Brophy's supposedly last outback tour. Brophy had planned to retire in 2012 but after encouragement from the general public, he decided to continue touring. Outback Fight Club was nominated for a Logie at the 2012 Logie Awards for Most Outstanding Factual Program but lost to Go Back To Where You Came From.

The program was also nominated for an AACTA Award for Best Documentary Series at the 1st AACTA Awards in 2012 but lost to SAS - The Search for Warriors. Brophy was also featured on the SBS program The Feed in 2016.

== Awards ==
Brophy was awarded a Medal of the Order of Australia in 2011 for his efforts in raising money for charities in Birdsville through his tent boxing work, and for services to the entertainment industry.

== Autobiography ==
In 2014, Brophy released an autobiography he had written with journalist Sue Williams called The Last Showman: The Life and Times of an Outback Tent-Boxing Legend. The book originated from decades of Brophy recording stories about his life in notebooks despite having dyslexia. The stories were typed up by a former secretary who once worked for politician Bob Katter as Brophy believed she was the only one who could decipher his handwriting. Williams then assisted Brophy in compiling the material into a book. As part of her research for the book, Williams visited Brophy's boxing tent and took part in a fight. Brophy said that although Williams didn't win her fight, she had performed well. Brophy has said he has allowed women to fight in his tent following the women's liberation movement. Another female writer, Helen McInerney, had previously documented her experience in 2010 on what it was like to be a woman fighting against one of Brophy's female boxers.

== News ==
Brophy's boxing tent made news in 2017 when Senator Pauline Hanson was seen making an appearance as a ring girl before a fight at the Birdsville Races. During Hanson's appearance, Brophy endorsed the politician by declaring that the people in the outback loved her and describing her as a "fair dinkum Australian".

While Brophy's tent boxing has continued to be a popular attraction at Birdsville and Mount Isa, Brophy does take his troupe to other events throughout Queensland.

== Tours ==
As of 2018, Brophy continues to tour Queensland with his boxing troupe. However, Brophy also now spends much of his time at pubs he owns in Kilkivan and Cracow. Brophy's troupe is based out of the Cracow Hotel. He has said he decided to get into pubs because he enjoys meeting people. Brophy has also said it was always his ambition to own an old Queensland hotel and bought the Cracow Hotel, built in 1935, because of how cheap it was due to Cracow being a ghost town.
