= Eidsvold–Theodore Road =

Road in Queensland, Australia

Eidsvold–Theodore Road Queensland

General information
- Type: Rural road
- Length: 143.7 km (89 mi)
- Route number(s): State Route 73

Major junctions
- East end: Burnett Highway Eidsvold
- Defence Road
- West end: Leichhardt Highway Theodore

Location(s)
- Major settlements: Cracow

Eidsvold–Theodore Road is a continuous 143.7 kilometres (89.3 mi) road route in the North Burnett and Banana regions of Queensland, Australia. The entire route is signed as State Route 73. It is a state-controlled district road (number 454) rated as a local road of regional significance.

== Route description ==
The road commences as Moreton Street at an intersection with the Burnett Highway (A3) in Eidsvold. It runs south-east, south-west and north-west, skirting the base of Mount Rose (a former gold mining site) before crossing the Burnett River to the west of Eidsvold. On the eastern bank of the river is Tolderodden Conservation Park, formerly part of the Eidsvold pastoral run. The road continues south-west and north-west through farming country and some forest until it reaches the locality of Eidsvold West. It continues to the north-west through Calrossie, Borania and Ballymore State Forests, where it passes the exit to Defence Road, before entering Cracow. It passes through Cracow as Third Avenue and Tenth Avenue before turning north-north-west through Camboon to Theodore, passing Theodore Airport. It passes through Theodore as Railway Parade, Fifth Avenue, and The Boulevard before ending at an intersection with the Leichhardt Highway (A5). The road from Cracow to Theodore follows the eastern side of the Dawson River valley through mostly irrigated farming land.

== Road condition ==
The road is fully sealed and is suitable for caravans and other large vehicles. It has a section of about 3.8 kilometres (2.4 mi) with an incline greater than 5%. A $17 million upgrade project was undertaken in 2012 on parts of a 77 kilometres (48 mi) section of the road in the North Burnett Region. This included replacing the steel deck of the Burnett River bridge.

== History ==
The Eidsvold pastoral run was licensed to Thomas Archer in 1848, and the town reserve was proclaimed in 1890. Gold was discovered in the 1850s but not in significant quantities until 1886, when it grew quickly as a mining town. By the late 1880s it had a population of almost 2,000.

The Cracow pastoral run was established in 1851. Gold was discovered in 1875, but did not lead to a major gold rush.

Pastoral leases were established in the Theodore area, including one named Woolthorpe, from 1850. In 1864 a town named Woolthorpe was surveyed but never developed. From 1893 Woolthorpe Station expanded through land acquisitions along the Dawson River.

A pastoral run was also established at Camboon, to the south-east of Theodore.

Primitive roads were cut between the various pastoral runs and their supporting towns, thus in time connecting Cracow to east and west.

In the 1920s a total of 475 small farms were offered for sale along the Dawson River near the town of Castle Creek, which was renamed Theodore in 1926. By this time parts of many of the pastoral runs had been given over to closer settlement. These factors contributed to the need for a better road from Eidsvold to Theodore.

=== Inland defence road ===
An inland defence road from Ipswich to Charters Towers was built during World War II. Much of it is now either abandoned or incorporated in modern roads. A 68 kilometres (42 mi) segment of the original road still exists as a public road between Cracow and Theodore. It includes four bridges of historical significance, and can be accessed from the Eidsvold–Theodore Road about 15 kilometres (9.3 mi) to the east of Cracow.

== Major intersections ==
All distances are from Google Maps.

LGA	Location	km	mi	Destinations	Notes
North Burnett	Eidsvold	0	0.0	Burnett Highway – south – Mundubbera north – Mulgildie	Eastern end of Eidsvold–Theodore Road (State Route 73); Road leaves Eidsvold as Moreton Street.
North Burnett, Banana midpoint	Eidsvold West, Cracow midpoint	77.5	48.2	Defence Road – northwest – Leichhardt Highway and Banana	Remnant of inland defence road built during World War II
Banana	Theodore	143.7	89.3	Leichhardt Highway – north – Banana – south – Taroom	Western end of Eidsvold–Theodore Road (State Route 73)
1.000 mi = 1.609 km; 1.000 km = 0.621 mi

== See also ==
- List of road routes in Queensland
- List of numbered roads in Queensland
- Eidsvold Homestead
