= Cynthia, Queensland =

Cynthia
- Town
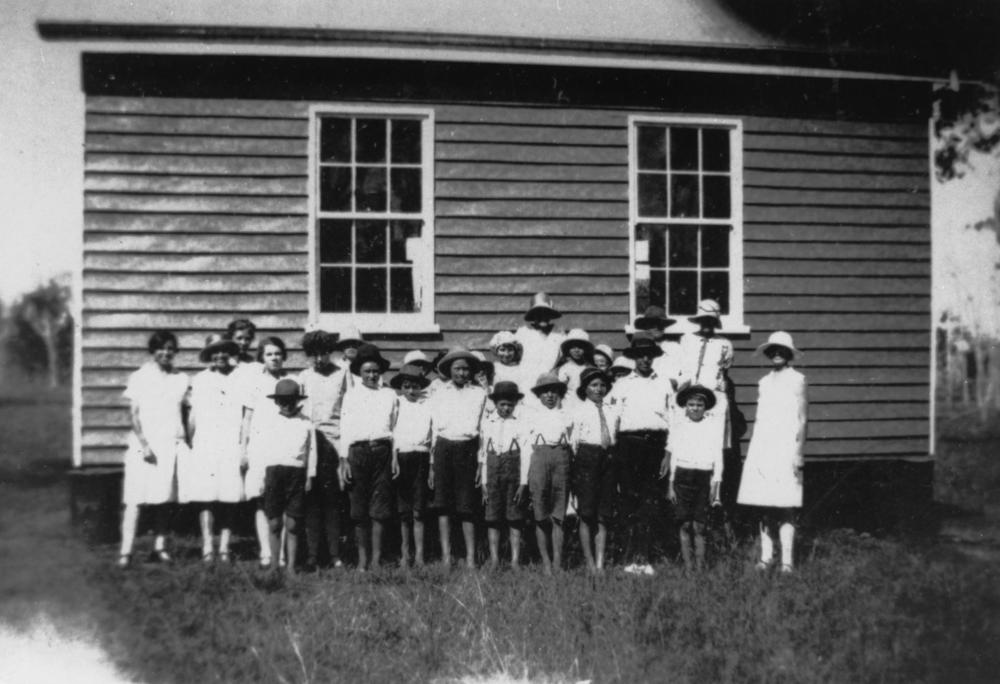
- Opening of Cynthia State School, 1928

- Interactive map of Cynthia
- Coordinates: 25.2111°S 151.1305°E
- Country: Australia
- State: Queensland
- LGA: North Burnett Region
- Location: 10.5 km (6.5 mi) S of Abercorn; 19.5 km (12.1 mi) N of Eidsvold; 98.7 km (61.3 mi) NW of Gayndah; 525 km (326 mi) NW of Brisbane

Government
  - State electorate: Callide
  - Federal division: Flynn

Area
  - Total: 110.8 km^{2} (42.8 sq mi)

Population
  - Total: 13 (2021 census)
  - Density: 0.117/km^{2} (0.304/sq mi)
- Time zone: UTC+10:00 (AEST)
- Postcode: 4627
Localities around Cynthia
Wuruma Dam	Abercorn	Abercorn
Wuruma Dam	Cynthia	Yarrol
Ceratodus	Ceratodus	Eidsvold East

Cynthia is a rural town and locality in the North Burnett Region, Queensland, Australia. In the 2021 census, the locality of Cynthia had a population of 13 people.

== Geography ==
The Burnett River bounds the locality to the east.

The Burnett Highway passes through the locality from the south to the north-east. Its intersection with the Waruma Dam Road is the official location of the former town but there is no settlement there today.

The now-closed Monto Branch Railway passed from north to south through the locality passing through the former town, which was served by the now-abandoned Cynthia railway station (25.2132°S 151.1299°E).

== History ==
The town and locality take their name from the railway station name given by Queensland Railways Department on 19 June 1925, using the name of the surrounding Cynthia Parish of the County of Yarrol.

Cynthia State School opened on 30 January 1928. It closed on 31 May 1954. It was also in the former town on the western side of Abercorn Road (Burnett Highway) to the south-east of the former railway station (25.21474°S 151.12956°E).

== Demographics ==
In the 2016 census, the locality of Cynthiahad a population of 31 people.

In the 2021 census, the locality of Cynthia had a population of 13 people.

== Education ==
There are no schools in Cynthia. The nearest government primary school is Abercorn State School in neighbouring Abercorn to the north. The nearest government secondary school is Eidsvold State School (to Year 12) in Eidsvold to the south.
