= Tent boxing =

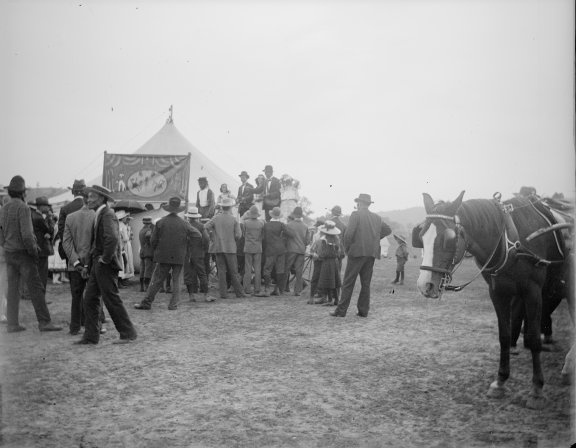
Boxing tent at the Gundagai show.

Tent boxing is an amusement previously seen at agricultural shows throughout Australia.

== History ==
Starting in the late 19th century, boxing troupes of professional fighters would travel the mining towns and outback of the country, following fairs and carnivals, putting up big top tents and taking on all-comers for cash in the ring.

Among the more famous of tent boxing troupes, are the ones created by Roy Bell and Jimmy Sharman.

Fred Brophy is believed to be one of the world's last boxing tent showmen. Brophy continues to travel with his troupe across Queensland each year. For his years of touring with his tent boxing show, Brophy was awarded the Medal of the Order of Australia in 2011 for his role in raising money for charity and for services to the entertainment industry.

== A dangerous sport ==
Largely unreported on, little is known about early tent boxers and events due to participants and spectators being largely illiterate. In more modern times, very few photographs exist of the movement as organisers disapprove of media involvement.

Fred Brophy insists he will continue travelling with his tent boxing troupe, until he dies, even though the sport was banned in New South Wales, Victoria, Western Australia and South Australia in 1971 by the government, due to health concerns.
