= Glenleigh =

- Suburb
- Interactive map of Glenleigh
- Coordinates: 25.0316°S 151.0650°E
- Country: Australia
- State: Queensland
- LGA: North Burnett Region
- Location: 24.5 km (15.2 mi) SSW of Monto; 148 km (92 mi) NNW of Gayndah; 184 km (114 mi) S of Gladstone; 195 km (121 mi) W of Bundaberg; 475 km (295 mi) NNW of Brisbane

Government
  - State electorate: Callide
  - Federal division: Flynn

Area
  - Total: 88.7 km^{2} (34.2 sq mi)

Population
  - Total: 39 (2021 census)
  - Density: 0.440/km^{2} (1.139/sq mi)
- Time zone: UTC+10:00 (AEST)
- Postcode: 4630
Suburbs around Glenleigh
Coominglah Forest	Coominglah Forest	Selene
Coominglah Forest	Glenleigh	Kapaldo
Wuruma Dam	Wuruma Dam	Abercorn

Glenleigh is a rural locality in the North Burnett Region, Queensland, Australia. In the 2021 census, Glenleigh had a population of 39 people.

== Geography ==
Selene State Forest is in the east of the locality. Apart from this protected area, the land use is predominantly grazing on native vegetation.

== History ==
Euruga State School opened on 7 June 1932, but on 13 June 1932, it was renamed Aberfeldie State School. It was approx 4 miles (6.4 km) from Mulgeldie. In 1937, the school building was relocated and renamed Glen Leigh State School. It closed in December 1961. It was located on the eastern corner of Glenleigh Road and Booths Road (approx 25.0421°S 151.0705°E).

== Demographics ==
In the 2016 census, Glenleigh had a population of 33 people.

In the 2021 census, Glenleigh had a population of 39 people.

== Education ==
There are no schools in Glenleigh. The nearest government primary schools are Abercorn State School in neighbouring Abercorn to the south-east and Mulgildie State School in Mulgildie to the north-east. The nearest government secondary school is Monto State High School in Monto to the north. There is also a Catholic primary school in Monto.
