= Yarrol, Queensland =

Yarrol
- Suburb
- Interactive map of Yarrol
- Coordinates: 25.0191°S 151.4261°E
- Country: Australia
- State: Queensland
- LGA: North Burnett Region
- Location: 51.6 km (32.1 mi) SSE of Monto; 56.4 km (35.0 mi) NE of Eidsvold; 72.2 km (44.9 mi) NNW of Gayndah; 143 km (89 mi) WSW of Bundaberg CBD; 407 km (253 mi) NNW of Brisbane

Government
  - State electorate: Callide
  - Federal division: Flynn

Area
  - Total: 950.2 km^{2} (366.9 sq mi)

Population
  - Total: 15 (2021 census)
  - Density: 0.0158/km^{2} (0.0409/sq mi)
- Time zone: UTC+10:00 (AEST)
- Postcode: 4630
Suburbs around Yarrol
Bancroft; Ventnor	Kalpowar; Molangul	Gaeta
Tellebang; Langley	Yarrol	Wonbah Forest; Wonbah
Abercorn; Cynthia	Eidsvold East; Mungy	Mount Perry

Yarrol is a rural locality in the North Burnett Region, Queensland, Australia. In the 2021 census, Yarrol had a population of 15 people.

== Geography ==
The Monto–Mount Perry Road enters the locality from the south-west (Langley) and exits to the south (Mungy).

There are two named peaks in the north of the locality:

- Mount Dalgaran (24.8582°S 151.3819°E) 519 metres (1,703 ft)
- Mount Goondicum (24.8594°S 151.4323°E) 558 metres (1,831 ft)

Most of the east of the locality is within the Bania National Park and the smaller Baywulla Creek Conservation Park. There are a number of areas of state forests, including the Yarrol State Forest in the north of the locality, the Bania State Forest in the centre and east of the locality, and the Baywulla State Forest in the south of the locality. Apart from these protected areas, the land use is grazing on native vegetation.

== History ==
Yarrol Road State School opened on 3 June 1946. In July 1948, it became Ventnor State School. It closed on 22 April 1960. It was at 1877 Yarrol Road in neighbouring Ventnor (24.91078°S 151.28643°E). In 1963, local residents made an offer of £150 to purchase the school from the Department of Education and the property was transferred to the Ventnor Progress Association on 15 March 1963. Since that time, the school complex has been used as headquarters for the progress association, for religious group services, farming and pastoral bodies and fire control groups and was regularly used as a polling booth. The Ventnor Progress Association continues to own and maintain the premises In the 1992, the school buildings were listed on the Queensland Heritage Register.

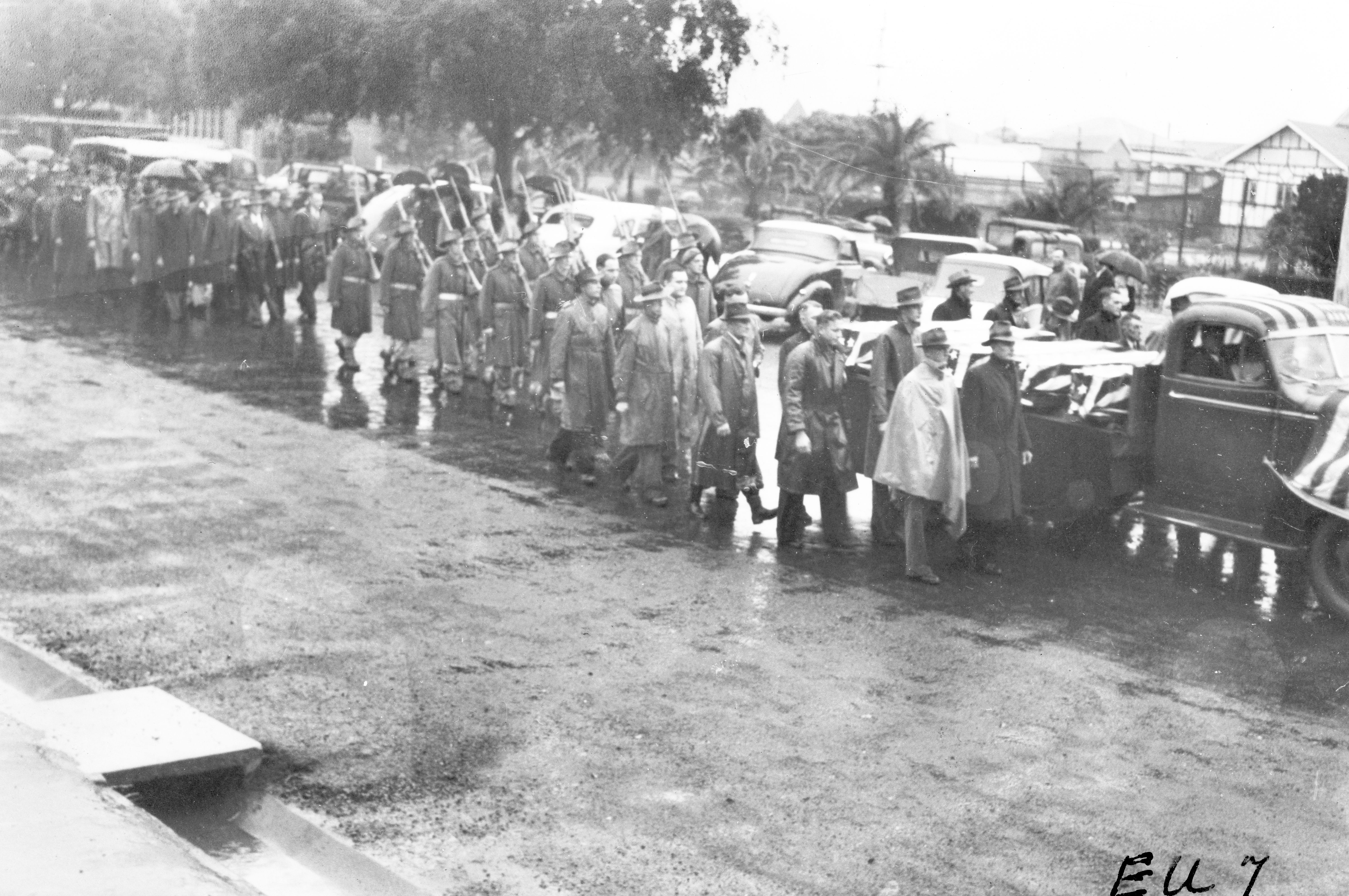
Funeral procession for the air crash victims in Bundaberg, 1948

In June 1948, two stockmen found the charred wreckage of an aeroplane and human remains in a 200-foot (61 m) gully on Magpie Station at Yarro. Military equipment found at the crash site suggested it was a World War II military aircraft, which was confirmed by an investigation by the Royal Australian Air Force which determined it was a twin-engine Douglas aircraft used by the United States Army operating as a transport aircraft that had been reported missing on 1 November 1943 on a flight from Rockhampton to Brisbane with 12 people listed on the manifest. An unsuccessful search had been conducted to find the missing aircraft after its disappearance. As the weather conditions on the day had been turbulent and the engines were found at some distance from the fuselage, it was determined the aircraft had broken up in mid-air. It was subsequently established that a 13th person was also onboard when a woman came forward claiming that her husband, an American serviceman, had been reported missing at the same time, suspecting he may have been on the flight; this was confirmed by finding his signet ring and identity disk at the wreck site. Of the 13 victims, six were American, six were Australian, and one was from England. The human remains could not be individually identified, but were buried in Bundaberg War Cemetery (within Bundaberg General Cemetery) in a graveside funeral service conducted by local clergymen. The coffins were carried on trucks draped in flags with a military escort who acted as pallbearers at the cemetery. Businesses in Bundaberg were closed allowing thousands of people, despite the heavy rain, to line the streets to pay a final tribute to the dead.

== Demographics ==
In the 2016 census, Yarrol had a population of 8 people.

In the 2021 census, Yarrol had a population of 15 people.

== Education ==
There are no schools in Yarrol. The nearest government primary schools are:

- Mount Perry State School in neighbouring Mount Perry to the south-east
- Eidsvold State School in Eidsvold to the south-west
- Abercorn State School in Abercorn to the south-west
- Mulgildie State School in Mulgildie to the west
- Monto State School in Monto to the north-west

The nearest government secondary schools are Eidsvold State School and Monto State High School in Monto.
