= Mungy, Queensland =

Mungy
- Suburb
- Interactive map of Mungy
- Coordinates: 25.2525°S 151.4552°E
- Country: Australia
- State: Queensland
- LGA: North Burnett Region
- Location: 53.6 km (33.3 mi) WNW of Eidsvold; 55.8 km (34.7 mi) NNW of Gayndah; 224 km (139 mi) NW of Gympie; 390 km (240 mi) NNW of Brisbane

Government
  - State electorate: Callide
  - Federal division: Flynn

Area
  - Total: 336.0 km^{2} (129.7 sq mi)

Population
  - Total: 0 (2021 census)
  - Density: 0.0000/km^{2} (0.000/sq mi)
- Time zone: UTC+10:00 (AEST)
- Postcode: 4671
Suburbs around Mungy
Yarrol	Yarrol	Mount Perry
Eidsvold East	Mungy	Mount Perry
Branch Creek	Branch Creek	Yenda

Mungy is a rural locality in the North Burnett Region, Queensland, Australia. In the 2021 census, Mungy had "no people or a very low population".

== Geography ==
Gin Gin–Mount Perry–Monto Road runs, through from east to north-west.

== Demographics ==
In the 2016 census, Mungy had a population of 3 people.

In the 2021 census, Mungy had "no people or a very low population".

== Education ==
There are no schools in Mungy. The nearest government primary schools are Eidsvold State School in Eidsvold to the west, Mount Perry State School in neighbouring Mount Perry to the east, and Binjour Plateau State School in neighbouring Binjour to the south. The nearest government secondary schools are Eidsvold State School (to Year 12) and Burnett State College (to Year 12) in Gayndah to the south-east.
