= Cheltenham, Queensland =

Cheltenham
- Suburb
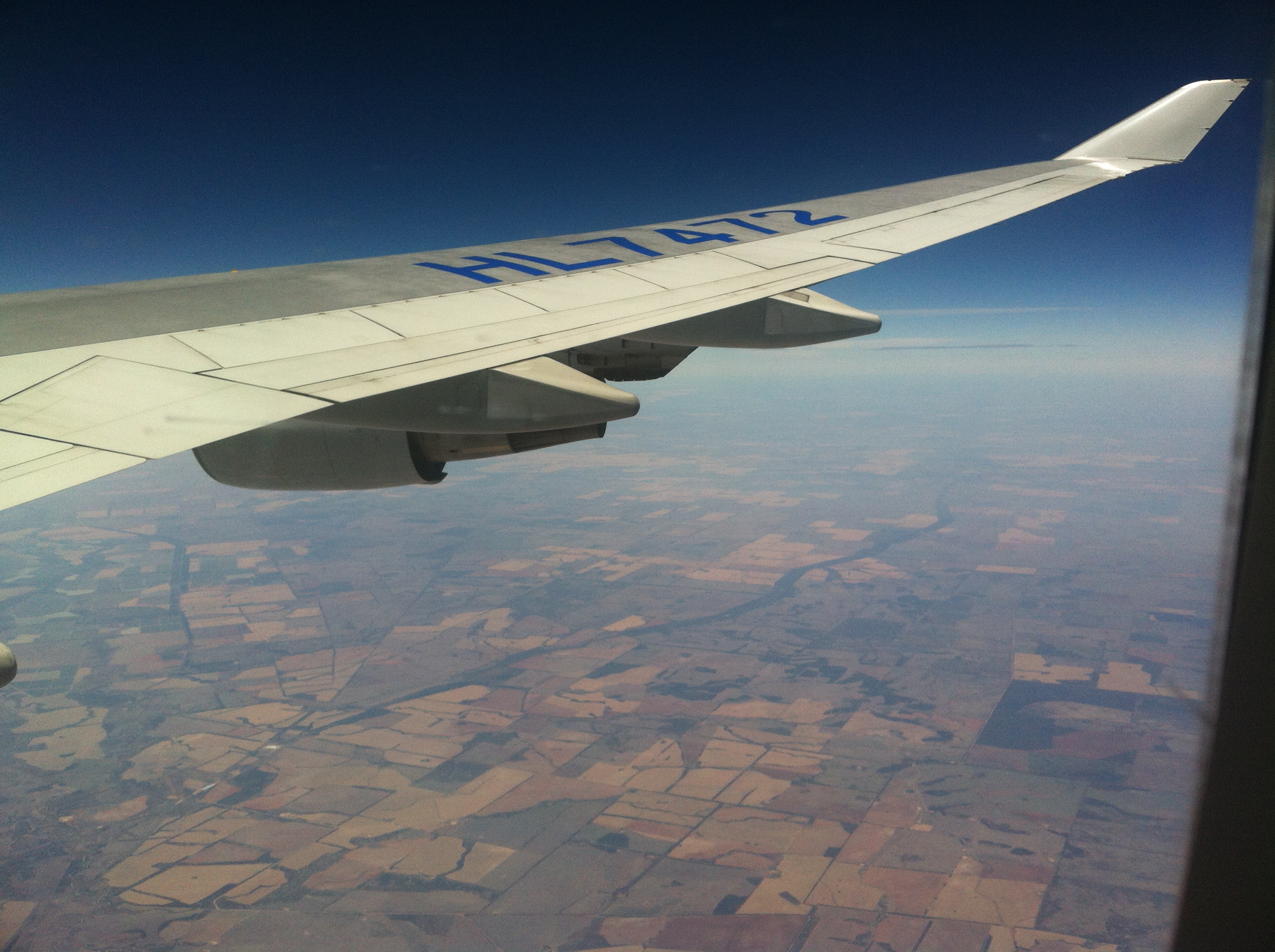
- Aerial view of Cheltenham, 2012

- Interactive map of Cheltenham
- Coordinates: 25.6261°S 150.7719°E
- Country: Australia
- State: Queensland
- LGA: North Burnett Region
- Location: 64.6 km (40.1 mi) SW of Eidsvold; 102 km (63 mi) W of Gayndah; 247 km (153 mi) WSW of Bundaberg; 434 km (270 mi) NW of Brisbane

Government
  - State electorate: Callide
  - Federal division: Flynn

Area
  - Total: 446.2 km^{2} (172.3 sq mi)

Population
  - Total: 10 (2021 census)
  - Density: 0.022/km^{2} (0.058/sq mi)
- Time zone: UTC+10:00 (AEST)
- Postcode: 4627
Suburbs around Cheltenham
| Eidsvold West | Eidsvold West | Eidsvold West |
| Eidsvold West | Cheltenham | Dykehead |
| Sujeewong | Hawkwood | Hawkwood |

Cheltenham is a rural locality in the North Burnett Region, Queensland, Australia. In the 2021 census, Cheltenham had a population of 10 people.

== Geography ==
Cheltenham has the following mountains (from north to south):

- Yerilla Mountain (25.6044°S 150.8159°E) 351 metres (1,152 ft)
- Wallaby Mountain (25.6190°S 150.8369°E) 331 metres (1,086 ft)
- Jack Shay Mountain (25.6543°S 150.7098°E 375 metres (1,230 ft))
- Dingo Trap Hill (25.6632°S 150.8321°E) 347 metres (1,138 ft)
- Mount Narayen (25.7314°S 150.7724°E) 490 metres (1,610 ft)

Two sections of the Yerilla State Forest are in the north of the locality. Apart from these protected areas, the land use is predominantly grazing on native vegetation.

== Demographics ==
In the 2016 census, Cheltenham had a population of 17 people.

In the 2021 census, Cheltenham had a population of 10 people.

== Education ==
There are no schools in Cheltenham. The nearest government primary schools are Eidsvold State School in Eidsvold to the north-east and Boynewood State School in Boynewood to the east. The nearest government secondary school is Eidsvold State School (to Year 12). However, students living in the west and south of the locality may be too distant to attend these schools; the alternatives are distance education and boarding school.
