= SS Cheltenham =

A number of ships were named Cheltenham, including –

- SS Cheltenham (1901), built by Pallion Shipyard, Sunderland. Torpedoed and sunk in 1917
- SS Cheltenham (1942), built by Short Brothers, Sunderland as Empire Envoy, in service 1946–52
