= Wuruma Dam =

Dam in Queensland, Australia

- Location of the dam in Queensland
- Interactive map of Wuruma Dam
- Country: Australia
- Location: Eidsvold, Wide Bay-Burnett, Queensland
- Coordinates: 25°12′04″S 150°59′23″E
- Purpose: Irrigation
- Status: Operational
- Opening date: 1969
- Construction cost: A$5.3 million
- Operator: Sunwater

Dam and spillways
- Type of dam: Gravity dam
- Impounds: Nogo River
- Height (foundation): 44 m (144 ft)
- Length: 343 m (1,125 ft)
- Elevation at crest: 235.46 m (772.5 ft) AHD
- Dam volume: 123×10^{3} m^{3} (4.3×10^{6} cu ft)
- Spillway type: Uncontrolled
- Spillway length: 91.44 m (300.0 ft)
- Spillway capacity: 3,823 m^{3}/s (135,000 cu ft/s)

Reservoir
- Creates: Lake Wuruma
- Total capacity: 194,000 ML (157,000 acre⋅ft)
- Active capacity: 165,400 ML (134,100 acre⋅ft)
- Catchment area: 2,349 km^{2} (907 sq mi)
- Surface area: 1,639 ha (4,050 acres)
- Maximum length: 343 m (1,125 ft)
- Maximum water depth: 36.6 m (120 ft)
- Normal elevation: 215 m (705 ft) AHD

The Wuruma Dam is a gravity dam across the Nogo River in the upper Burnett River catchment in the North Burnett Region, Queensland, Australia. The structure also included an earth and rock-fill embankment saddle dam. Located 48 kilometres (30 mi) north-west of Eidsvold and completed in 1969 at a cost of A$5.3 million, the resultant reservoir, Lake Wuruma, supplies water for irrigation and town use for Eidsvold, Mundubbera and Gayndah.

== Overview ==
The dam wall is of mass concrete gravity construction and is 44 metres (144 ft) high and 343 metres (1,125 ft) long. The saddle dam is 12.3 metres (40 ft) high and its embankment is 182.88 metres (600.0 ft) long. The reservoir has capacity of 165,400 megalitres (134,100 acre⋅ft) when full and covers 1,639 hectares (4,050 acres), that is drawn from a catchment area of 2,349 square kilometres (907 sq mi). The uncontrolled spillway comprises a concrete ogee crest that can handle 3,823 cubic metres per second (135,000 cu ft/s).

The dam takes its name from a local Indigenous word meaning brahminy kite.

After reaching a low of 0.03% in September 1970, Wuruma Dam overflowed for the first time in February 1971. It recorded its highest level of 142.64% capacity (3.74 metres (12.3 ft) over the spillway) in January 2013 as a result of heavy rains from ex-Tropical Cyclone Oswald.

In 2008 Sunwater commenced a dam spillway capacity upgrade program that included Wuruma Dam.

== Recreation ==
A Stocked Impoundment Permit is required to fish in the dam.

== See also ==
- List of dams and reservoirs in Australia
