= Construction of Queensland railways =

Map of Queensland Railways, 1904

Queensland's railway construction commenced in 1864, with the turning of the first sod of the Main Line by Lady Diamantina Bowen, the wife of Queensland's first governor Sir George Bowen at Ipswich, Queensland, Australia. A narrow gauge of 3 ft 6 in (1,067 mm) was selected due to cost savings in providing a rail link to Toowoomba. Despite being built with bridges wide enough for standard gauge, and the fact that most other lines did not require heavy earthworks, the gauge remained the Queensland system norm.

In 1890 there were 11 separate systems being operated by Queensland Railways. The duplications of workshops and other facilities and the inability to transfer locomotives and rolling stock to meet shifting traffic demands between lines created problems.

The North Coast railway line, roughly following the coast, and three inland routes now provide the core of the state's rail network. Numerous branch lines, many since closed, once serviced remote areas and provided transport to local industries, particularly mining.

== History ==
The pattern of early Queensland railway development was focused upon providing transport from inland areas to ports at the lowest possible cost. Coastal shipping provided adequate connections between the coastal communities and so priority was given to building railways which would facilitate development and immigration to the interior of the colony. This resulted in separate lines being constructed in isolation, rather than as extensions to a connected system.

=== Sections ===
The 11 sections (as at 1 May 1890) were:

- 1: Brisbane – Charleville, Warwick & Yandina
- 2: Cooroy – Gympie – Maryborough – Bundaberg
- 3: North Bundaberg – Mount Perry
- 4: Rockhampton – Longreach, Clermont & Springsure
- 5: North Rockhampton – Emu Park
- 6: Mackay – Eton & Mirani
- 7: Bowen – Guthalungra
- 8: Townsville – Hughenden
- 9: Cairns – Mareeba
- 10: Cooktown – Laura
- 11: Normanton – Croydon

=== Time to connect ===
In 1883 the Queensland government had decided to connect Brisbane to Gladstone, and by 1900 to extend that line north to Rockhampton. In 1910 the most significant scheme to connect all remaining significant systems was made with the passing of the North Coast Railway Act. Another scheme, the Great Western Railway proposal, was commenced but later abandoned.

Set out below are the opening dates of the linking sections, and the systems so linked using the above numbering.

- 15 June 1891: Bundaberg – North Bundaberg (2 & 3)
- 17 July 1891: Yandina – Cooroy (1 & 2)
- 1 October 1897: Rosedale – Iveragh links Gladstone to Brisbane
- 6 November 1899: Rockhampton – North Rockhampton (4 & 5)
- 18 December 1903: Gladstone – Rockhampton (3 & 4)
- 1 September 1913: Home Hill – Carstairs (7 & 8)
- 24 September 1921: St Lawrence – Carmila (5 & 6)
- 1 December 1923: Farleigh – Proserpine (6 & 7)
- 10 December 1924: Lily Pond – Feluga, Innisfail – Daradgee (8 & 9)

The remote Cooktown to Laura line closed in 1961. The Normanton to Croydon line remains the sole isolated line operated by Queensland Rail.

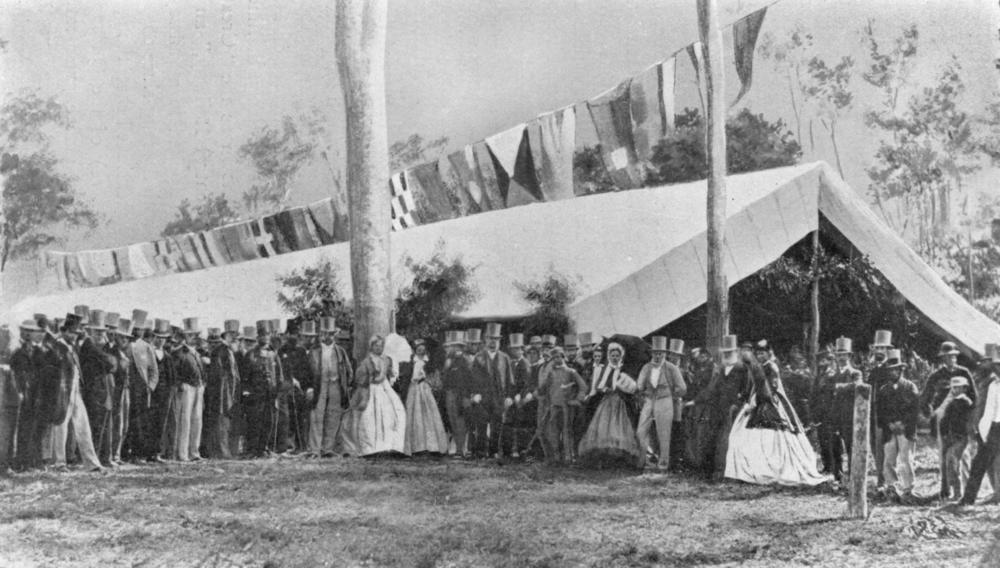
Official opening of the first section of the Ipswich to Grandchester railway, Ipswich, 1865

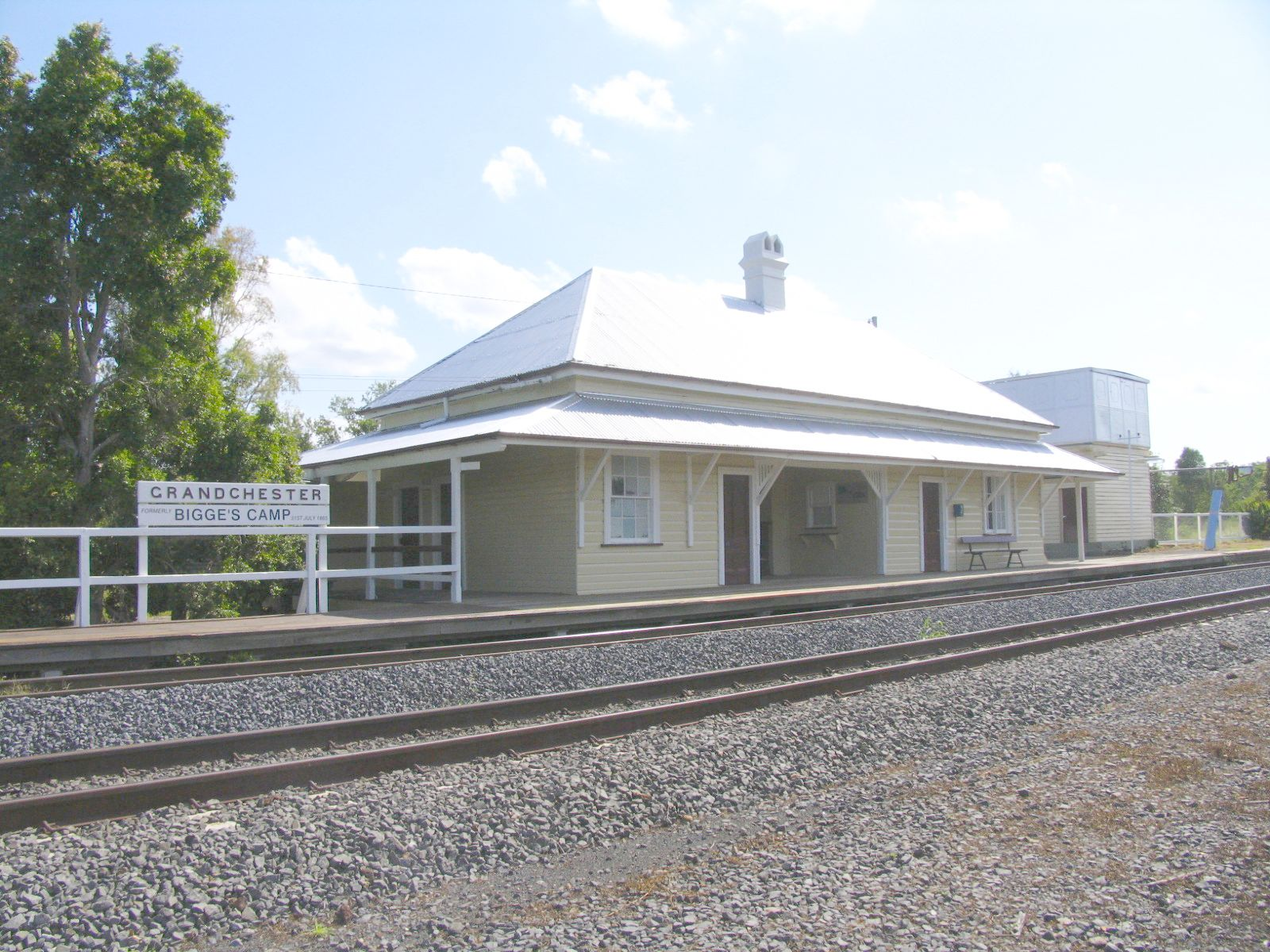
Grandchester railway station

== Thematic ==
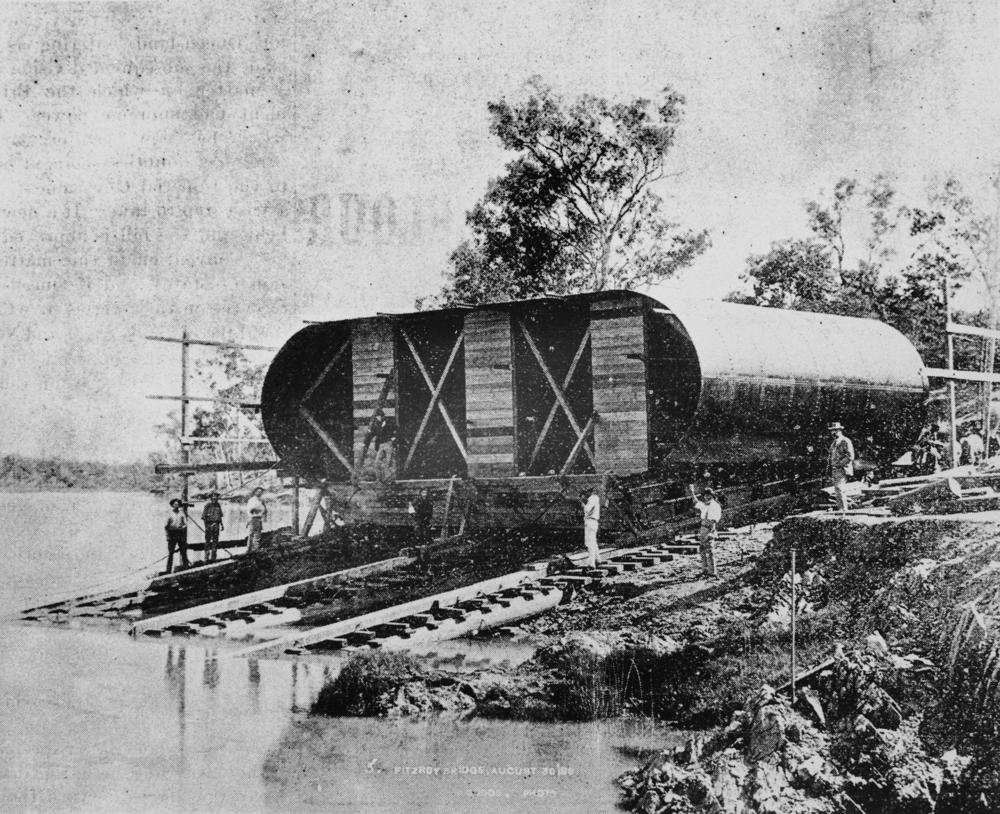
Bridge construction across the Fitzroy River, 1898

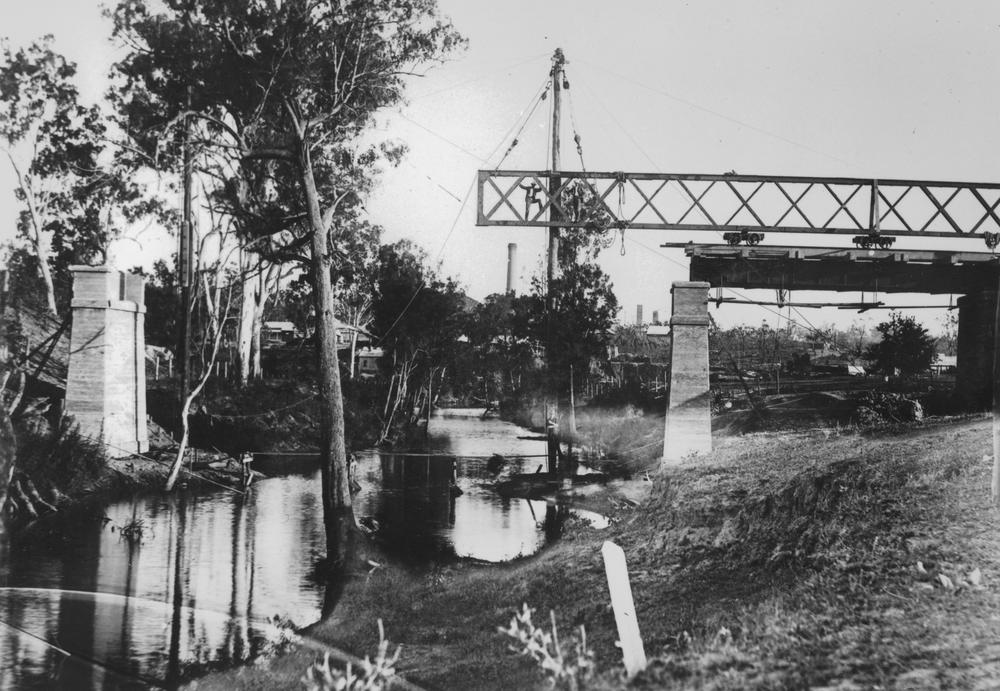
Return Creek Railway Bridge under construction, ~1901

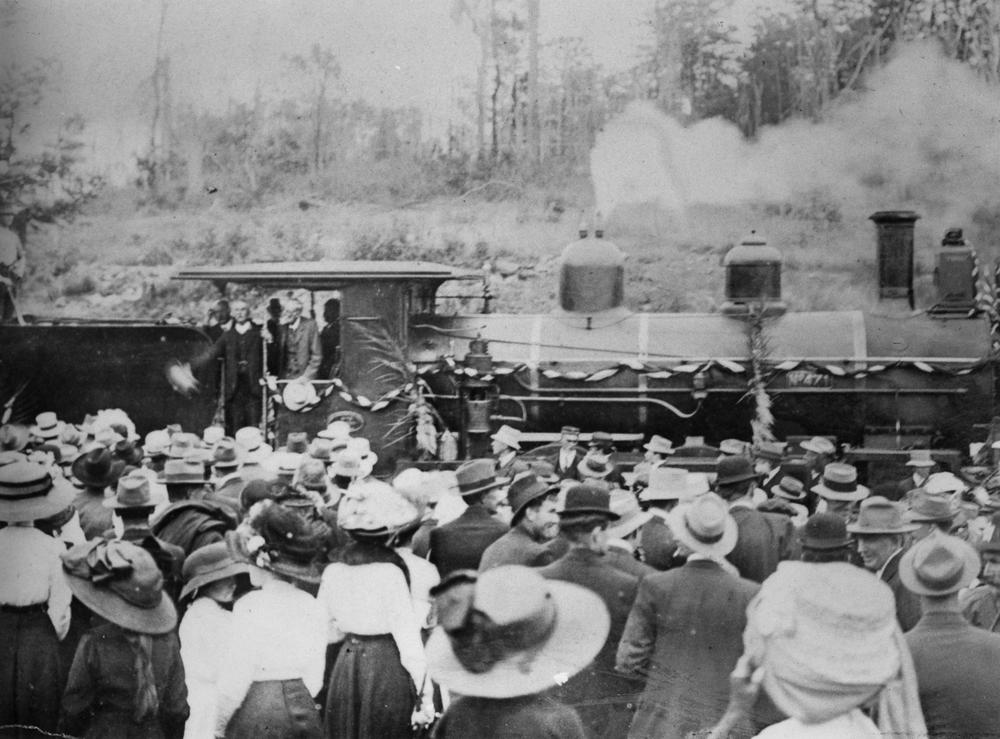
Opening of the railway in Yarraman, 1913

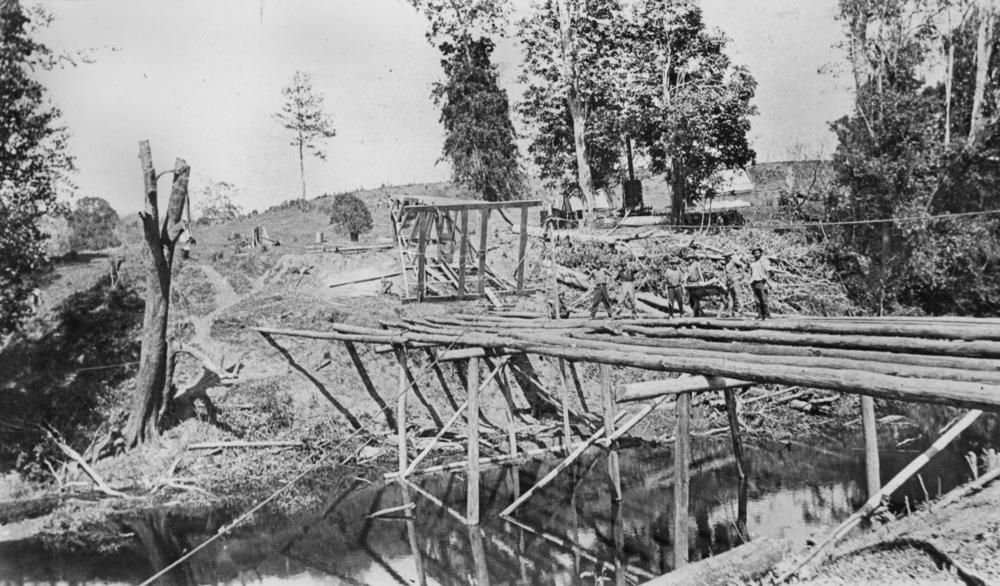
Construction of a bridge on the Mary Valley Heritage Railway, 1918

Thematically, the rationale for railway construction could be divided into the following categories:

- Access from port to interior 1865–1932
- Access to mining areas (or 1st era mine lines) 1881–1929
- Traditional branch lines 1882–1930
- System integration 1883–ongoing
- Contemporary heavy haulage (or 2nd era mine lines) 1952–ongoing
- Urban passenger service 1882–ongoing

=== Access to the interior ===
When the colony of Queensland separated from New South Wales in 1859, it was a vast undeveloped area with a non-indigenous population of ~30,000. With land as its only significant asset and revenue source, the Queensland government gave priority to facilitating access to and development of any area which showed promise.

The first priority was a line to provide the fertile Darling Downs region with reliable land transport to a river port, and the Main Line was opened from Ipswich to Dalby between 1865–1868, and extended to Cunnamulla over the next 30 years, providing access to significant areas of country used predominantly for livestock grazing. The line was extended east to Brisbane in 1876 to improve port access.

The Southern line from Toowoomba was opened to Warwick in 1871, and extended to the NSW border at Wallangarra in 1887, providing a rail link (with changes of gauge) to Sydney, Melbourne and Adelaide.

The Central West line from Rockhampton to Longreach was opened between 1867–1892, again servicing significant areas of grazing land. The Great Northern line from Charters Towers to Hughenden was opened between 1884 and 1887, and to Winton in 1899 in order to serve significant areas of grazing land. The Hughenden – Julia Creek section opened between 1903–1907 was for the same purpose.

The Atherton Tablelands rail network was built to service productive agricultural areas once the line reached Mareeba.

The South Western line was built to prevent freight, especially wool, being shipped via NSW, explaining why the line never serviced St George, the largest town in the region.

The North Coast line was the last trunk line built, serving many agricultural areas.

The last section of traditional line opened in Queensland, from Thangool – Lawgi in 1932 was part of a scheme to link the town of Monto to Rockhampton, although by then Monto was already connected to two other ports, and so its abandonment as a result of the depression is not surprising.

The first branch line to close in Queensland was built to improve Rockhampton's access to a port, but the Broadmount line was opened in 1898 before other major port facilities were built, and became a redundant line once the NCL from Gladstone was opened in 1903. The fact it remained open until 1929 is a testament to hope over reality.

=== 1st era mine lines ===
Mining has always been a significant part of the Queensland economy, and railways were built to facilitate mine development, though some of the early lines were as notable for being opened as the mining field declined, and one line didn't make it to the mining field before it petered out.

The first lines built primarily for mining were Townsville–Charters Towers, Warwick–Stanthorpe, Maryborough–Gympie and the Mount Perry line. The latter is an example of a line that was open for only a short period before the mining field declined, leaving it serving relatively poor quality agricultural land.

The Emerald-Clermont line was built to a copper mine, but it served good quality grazing land and was not affected by the closure of the mine. It returned to being a mining line when the Blair Athol coal extension opened in 1910.

A line to facilitate coal exports that probably should have been built sooner was the Corinda–Stanley Street wharf line at south Brisbane. The extension of the Main Line railway from Ipswich towards Brisbane was originally proposed to assist transport of coal, but the approval didn't include a connection to Brisbane's river port, and it opened in 1875 serving the city centre. The line to Stanley Street finally opened 9 years later, serving the coal wharves for 80 years.

In contrast the lines to Ravenswood and Croydon served largely to assist miners to leave the areas, each opening as the fields were in decline. The Ravenswood line became the first rural branch line to close in 1930, and the Normanton to Croydon line survives largely due to its isolation, it never being connected to the QR network.

The other line that was never connected to the network never even made it to the mining field it was built to serve. The Cooktown line was opened about halfway to the Palmer goldfield when construction was abandoned, and remained open until 1961 to serve a small population in a remote area, having only a weekly railmotor for the last 34 years it operated.

The Cairns line was commenced to serve the Herberton tin field, though by the time it reached the Tableland that field was also in decline. However, the line went on to be a vital connection for the Chillagoe and Etheridge mining fields, which were developed privately as by that time the government had become averse to risking construction of a line primarily for mining purposes.

Ironically, with the benefit of hindsight the line to Cloncurry could have been built years earlier with no risk to the government. The Croydon line was intended for Cloncurry until it was diverted in 1890, and Cloncurry waited 20 years for a railway. Today the Mount Isa line continues to serve this major mining centre.

Another line that suffered from the lack of geological knowledge of the era was the branch to Mount Morgan, built including Queensland's only rack railway in order to minimise cost as insurance in case the Mount Morgan mine had a short life. The mine in fact turned out to be one of the richest in Australia, and lasted nearly a century. The rack section may have saved on construction cost, but added significantly to ongoing operating costs, and was bypassed in 1952.

The last line in this section, from Bowen to Collinsville foreshadowed the post 1950 expansion of mineral lines, being one of the first lines serving the Bowen Basin coalfields.

=== Traditional branch lines ===
Every community within a reasonable distance of a railway line benefited once it had opened, and the calls for new lines to service any community without access was a dominant political issue until the 1930s.

The first branch line opened was from Ipswich south to Harrisville in 1882, serving a fertile valley. The constant pressure to minimise expenditure resulted in adoption of 1 in 30 (~3.3%) grades and alignments beside roads. The problems caused by such steep grades was soon realised, and subsequent sections adopted 1 in 50 (2%) grades, but the light level of traffic meant the original section was never upgraded.

The early branch lines served areas with good quality agricultural land (or the potential for it), including around Emerald, Toowoomba and Warwick. Later lines served more marginal agricultural land, and the cost-benefit equation became more subjective in such areas, especially after better road transport became available from 1920 or so.

The last traditional branch line opened (as opposed to an extension of an existing line) was from Inglewood to Texas in 1930. Some branch lines were linked, others had proposals for links, but few remained open once the electorate put more importance on roads for transport after WW2.

=== System integration ===
Arguably the first decision of the Queensland government towards system integration was in 1883, when the linking of the Brisbane and Maryborough rail systems, plus the construction of a line to Gladstone was approved, being the genesis of the North Coast line (NCL). When completed in 1897, it linked three (or four if you count the section built south of Gladstone) of the 11 separate railway systems that had existed in 1890.

The Park line was connected to the Central Western line with the opening of the Alexandra Railway Bridge across the Fitzroy River in 1899, potentially anticipating the opening of the Gladstone-Rockhampton section of the NCL in 1903.

The most significant system integration decision was the passage of the North Coast Railway and the Great Western Railway Acts in 1910. Whilst the latter proposed system was effectively abandoned in 1917, the construction of the NCL north of Rockhampton was undertaken intermittently until in 1924 Cairns and the Tablelands network were connected to the remainder of the QR system (with the exception of the Cooktown and Normanton railways, which were never connected).

Opening of the link between German Creek, then part of the Blackwater coal network, and Norwich Park on the Goonyella coal network in 1983 provided a contingency connection rather than further system integration, as the two networks continue to operate independently.

Another system integration component could be considered the Merivale Bridge, opened in 1978, which connected the Brisbane suburban rail systems that had been functionally separated for close to a century.

The opening in 2012 of the North Goonyella – Newlands line (also previously known as the northern missing link) provides the Goonyella network with an alternative coal terminal, whilst the 'southern missing link', which the Surat Basin railway proposal is alternatively known as, appears unlikely to be realised in the foreseeable future due to the slowing demand for additional export coal.

=== 2nd era mineral lines ===
The lull in rail construction activity for mining purposes in the 1930s and 1940s simply reflected the economic situation of the Depression and then World War II. Commencing with the construction of a branch to the Callide coal mine inland of Gladstone in 1953 (and the associated bypassing of the rack section at Mount Morgan), there have been a number of 'mineral' (as the term was used by QR) lines constructed, the rate of which again reflected the relative economic demand for Queensland minerals (especially coal), in particular for export.

The Mount Isa and Collinsville lines were significantly upgraded in the early 1960s to facilitate mineral export from, and coal transport to the expanding mining and refining complex. These lines became QR's first high quality long-distance lines, capable of contemporary best practice railway efficiency such as multiple unit locomotive operation. They were termed 'A class' lines by QR, meaning a 15-ton axle load, a 20% increase on the previous maximum.

The Moura mine was connected by a short branch to the existing Dawson Valley branch in 1963, but the opening of the Moura Short Line as a direct connection to Gladstone in 1968 (including the first use of CTC signalling on the system) heralded the heavy haulage future for QR, followed by the Goonyella line in 1971. These lines were a quantum leap in QR capability, and were termed 'S class' (for Special) lines, with an 18-ton axle load. They enabled the introduction of mid-train radio controlled locomotives (called Locotrol by QR), resulting in six loco, 10,000 ton gross, 1.8-kilometre (1.1 mi) long coal trains becoming the norm on the Goonyella system lines.

Two non-coal mineral lines were developed in the 1970s, to Greenvale to haul nickel ore to a refinery near Townsville, and to Phosphate Hill, south of Mt Isa, its ore being evident by the name. The Greenvale line closed in 1993 when the ore was exhausted. The Phosphate Hill line had a patchy start when the rock phosphate was discovered to be more expensive to process than envisaged, and the line was put in virtual 'care and maintenance' status for close to 20 years. Once a natural gas supply became available, processing became economic and the line has seen steady traffic since then.

The upgrading of the existing Central Western network to service the Blackwater area coal mines was less dramatic, but equally significant, as was the further upgrading and extension of the Collinsville line to Newlands in 1984.

Electrification of the Blackwater and Goonyella coal systems in 1987 enabled further increases in tonnage, more efficiency and concurrent improvements such as CTC signalling (where it hadn't already been installed), as did the 140 kilometres (87 mi) duplication of the core Goonyella line, the 100 kilometres (62 mi) duplication from Gladstone – Rocklands, and the ongoing duplication between Rocklands – Blackwater, where the 42 kilometres (26 mi) due to open by 2015 will complement the sections already duplicated totalling 61 kilometres (38 mi).

Exports continued to grow to the point where even Brisbane was revived as an export coal terminal in 1983, when the Box Flat mine began railing coal there, followed by the Ebenezer mine in 1990. Currently five mines served by the Western line and/or the Main Line railway rail coal up to 350 kilometres (220 mi) to the Port of Brisbane, most of it descending Queensland's original Main Line, somewhat vindicating the decision to build the world's first narrow gauge main line.

Recently constructed coal lines include to Hail Creek, Rollestone (Bauhinia line) and the North Goonyella to Newlands line, with Aurizon, the privatised successor to QR undertaking trials of 25,000 gross tonne trains that are 4 kilometres (2.5 mi) long in the continual quest for additional capacity and efficiency.

=== Urban passenger services ===
The first line built for urban purposes in Queensland was the Roma Street-Sandgate line opened in 1882 in order to provide convenient access to the seaside for Brisbanites. The Doomben line proving a similar connection to the main Brisbane racecourse was opened 6 months later.

Rockhampton residents demanded a similar convenience, and the Emu Park line subsequently opened in 1888.

Built by the Belmont Shire Council to provide a passenger service, the Belmont Tramway opened in 1912 but was not a success and closed in 1926.

The expanded Brisbane City Council provided an extensive electric tram service to most developed areas of the city, and the replacement bus service from 1968 continued to supplement the suburban rail services.

The decision to electrify the suburban network, which was implemented between 1979 and 1988, resulted in major improvements to passenger comfort (first air-conditioned suburban trains in Australia), frequency (30 minute 'clock face' timetables introduced) and reduced transit times. Patronage increased by 60–65% on most lines in the first full year after electrification.

The former rural branch line to Cleveland (opened 1888, closed beyond Lota in 1960) was rebuilt on the original alignment to contemporary standards as a suburban line, opening in sections between 1982 and 1987.

Similarly the South Coast line (opened 1885, closed beyond Beenleigh 1964) was rebuilt but on an improved alignment and opened (as the Gold Coast line) in sections between 1993 and 2009. There are further plans to extend this line to Coolangatta Airport.

A new suburban railway, to a new greenfield suburb was opened between 2011–13 to Springfield, with a proposal to extend it to Ipswich.

Redcliffe, a peninsula 40 kilometres (25 mi) north of Brisbane has had railway proposals for a century. A construction contract was signed in 2013 for a line from Petrie to Kippa Ring, opening in October 2016.

Other urban line proposals include Cross River Rail to increase inner city capacity, a 'New Beaudesert' line by converting the existing standard gauge line to dual gauge from Salisbury to Bromelton (west of Beaudesert, the rural branch line to there closed in 1993), and the Beerwah-Maroochydore railway line.

== Key network growth chronology ==
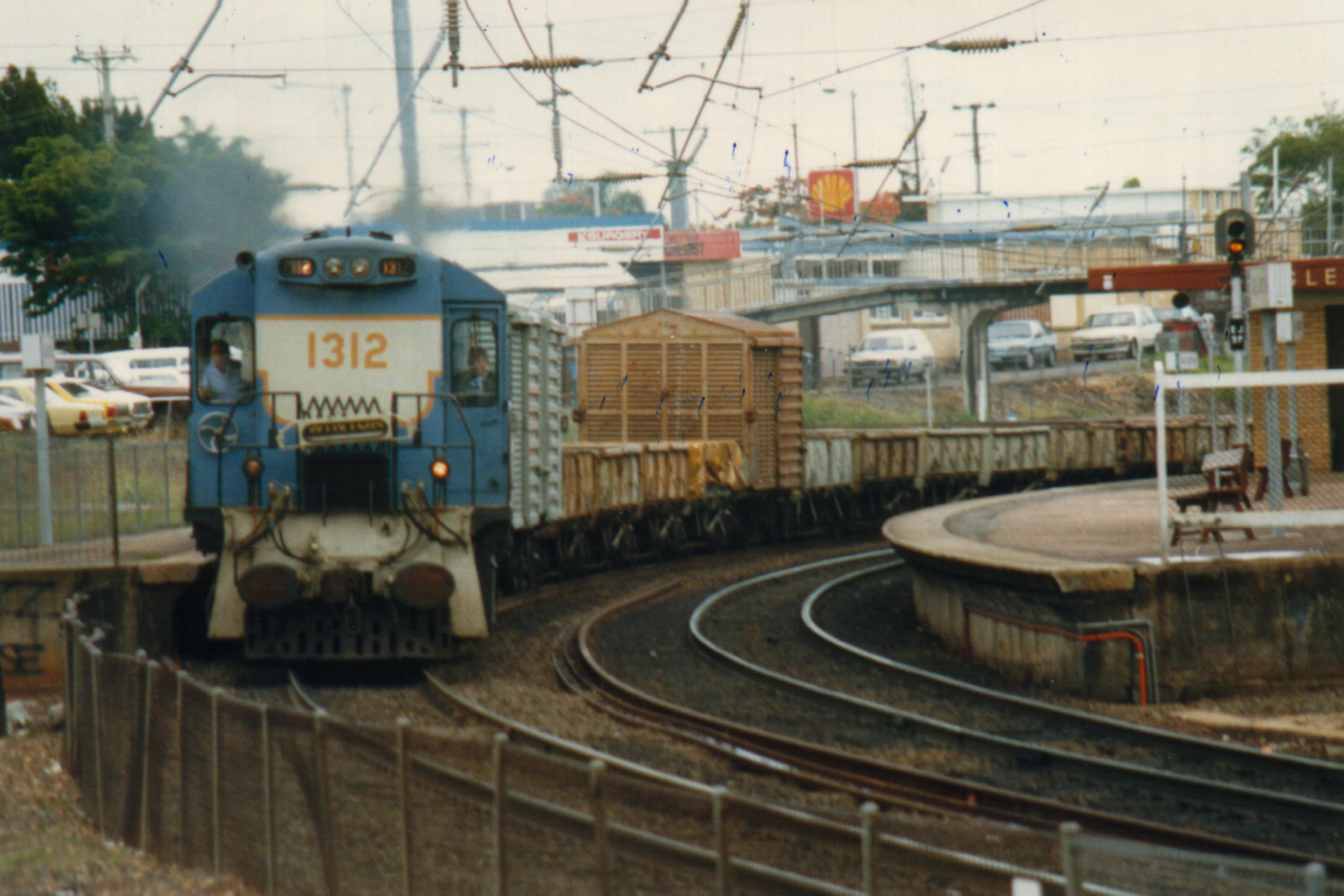
Queensland Rail 1300 class diesel on a freight train at Eagle Junction

- 1865 – Ipswich to Grandchester railway opened, first section of the Main Line railway
- 1867 – Main Line reaches Toowoomba
- 1867 – Rockhampton to Westwood line opened, first section of the Central West line
- 1875 – Main Line extended to Oxley Point (now Chelmer), on the opposite bank of the Brisbane River to Indooroopilly in Brisbane
- 1876 – Albert Bridge at Indooroopilly opened, allowing rail travel from Brisbane to Ipswich, Toowoomba, Dalby and Warwick
- 1879 – Central West line reaches Emerald
- 1882 – Great Northern Line (now Mount Isa line) opens from Townsville to Charters Towers
- 1882 – Opening of Shorncliffe line to Shorncliffe (then called Sandgate)
- 1882 – Opening of Pinkenba railway line from Brisbane to Ascot
- 1882 – Opening of Harrisville branch line from Ipswich, the first traditional country branch line in Queensland
- 1887 – Southern railway line from Toowoomba extended to meet New South Wales Government Railways' standard gauge line at Wallangarra
- 1888 – Western line reaches Charleville
- 1888 – First section of the North Coast Line opened to Caboolture
- 1890 – Opening of the Bowen Railway creates the 11th separate railway, 9 of them subsequently being connected by 1924
- 1890 – Tunnel connecting Brunswick Street and Central stations open
- 1891 – Tablelands line from Cairns opens through the Barron Gorge to Kuranda
- 1892 – Central West line reaches Longreach
- 1897 – Opening of the Cairns-Mulgrave Tramway
- 1898 – Western line to Cunnamulla opened
- 1899 – New (current) Central station opens
- 1899 – Winton line opens to Winton
- 1908 – Great Northern Line opens to Cloncurry
- 1911 – The "Hole-in-the-Wall" at Bowen Hills opened as part of the development of the Mayne rail yard
- 1913 – First self-propelled railmotors introduced (McKeen Cars — imported from U.S.A.).
- 1924 – North Coast line opens to Cairns
- 1928 – Central West line reaches Winton
- 1929 – Great Northern Line reaches Mount Isa
- 1930 – Texas branch line opened from Inglewood, last traditional country branch line opened in Queensland
- 1930 – Standard gauge railway opens from Brisbane to Sydney, trains are ferried across the Clarence River until the opening of the Grafton Bridge in 1932
- 1963 – Quadruplication between Roma Street and Corinda opens
- 1968 – Moura Short Line heavy-haul railway opens between Gladstone and Moura
- 1971 – Heavy-haul railway opens from Hay Point to Goonyella
- 1978 – Merivale Bridge opens, connecting South Brisbane to Roma Street
- 1979 – First electrified line opens in Brisbane between Ferny Grove and Darra
- 1986 – First rural electrified line opens for coal haulage
- 1995 – Standard gauge line completed to Port of Brisbane
- 1996 – Gold Coast line opens, on a new alignment, from Beenleigh to Helensvale
- 1997 – Gold Coast line extended to Nerang
- 1998 – Gold Coast line extended to Robina
- 2001 – Privately owned Airport railway line from Eagle Junction to Brisbane Airport opens
- 2009 – Gold Coast line extended to Varsity Lakes
- 2011 – First section of Springfield line opens
- 2013 – Final section of Springfield line opens
- 2016 – Redcliffe Peninsula line opens

== Geographic ==
=== Western line ===
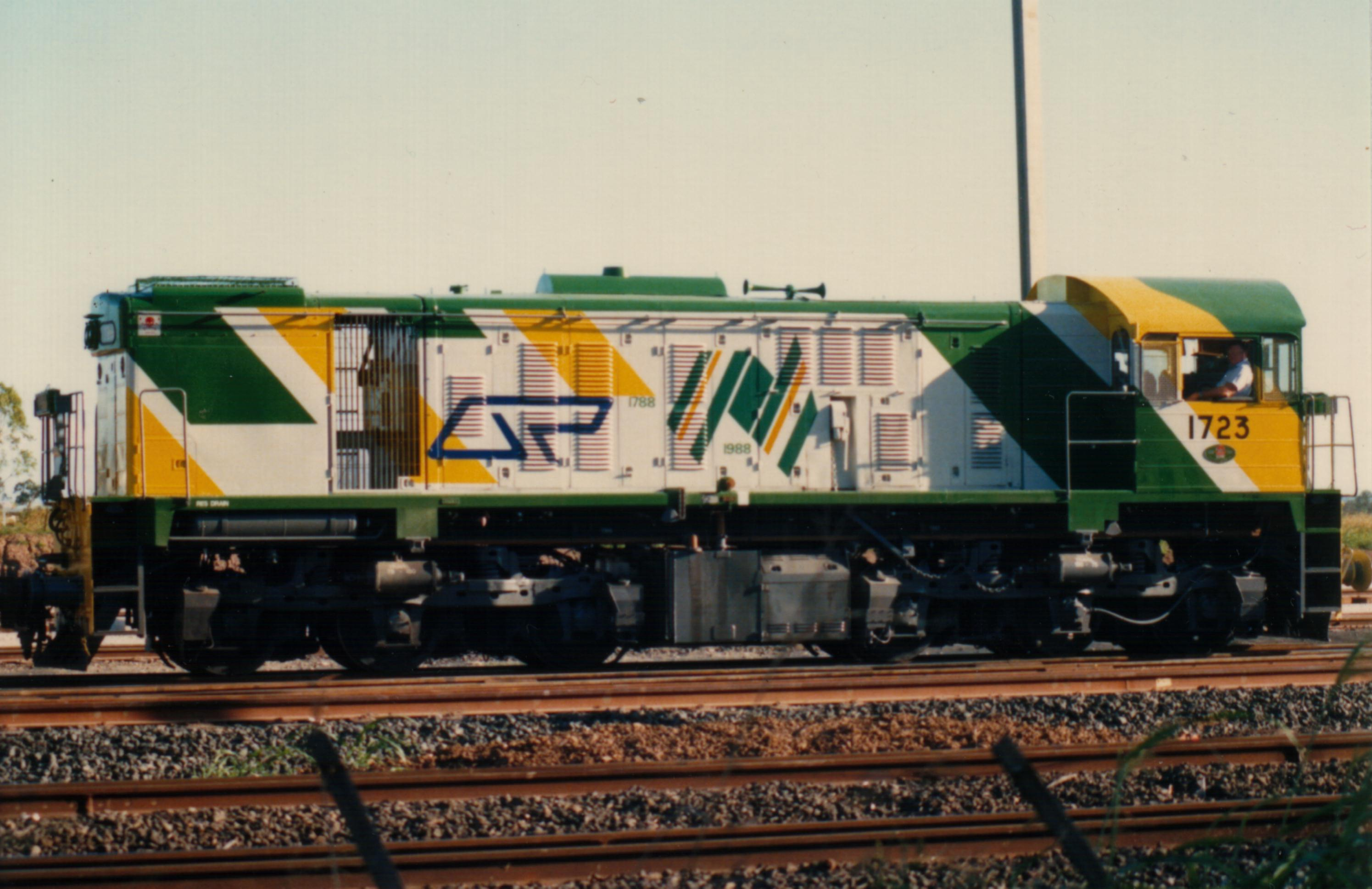
1720 class diesel locomotive in a livery celebrating the 1988 Australian Bicentenary

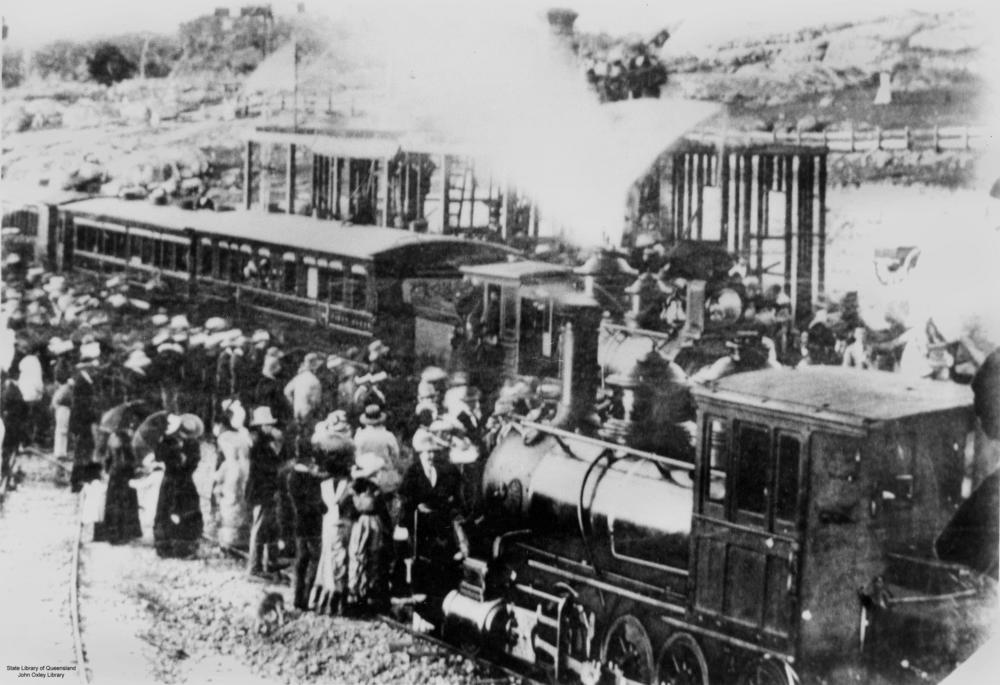
Railway opening at Stanthorpe, 1881

The first railway built in Queensland ran from Ipswich to Dalby. This line was opened to Bigge's Camp (now Grandchester) on 31 July 1865. It extended to Gatton in 1866 through multiple tunnels including the Victoria Tunnel, to Toowoomba in 1867 and to Dalby in 1868. The railway was extended from Ipswich to Brisbane in 1876. The line from Dalby had been extended to Chinchilla in 1878, Roma in 1880, Charleville in 1888 and Cunnamulla in 1898.

Branch lines were opened from Dalby to Tara in 1914, Meandarra in 1927 and Glenmorgan in 1931 (Glenmorgan Branch). From Dalby to Jandowae in 1911 (Jandowae Branch). The Oakey–Cooyar branch line was completed in 1913, as well as more branches to Evanslea in 1915 and Cecil Plains in 1919 (Cecil Plains Branch). Both are now abandoned. A branch line was opened from Miles to Wandoan in 1914 (Wandoan Branch). A branch line opened from Roma to Orallo in 1916 and Injune in 1920 (Injune Branch). The main western line was extended from a junction at Westgate (south of Charleville) to Cooladdi in 1913 and Quilpie in 1917.

A branch line was built from Gowrie Junction to Hendon (near Allora, in the Darling Downs) in 1869. This line was extended to Warwick in 1871, Stanthorpe in 1881 and Wallangarra in 1887 to meet the New South Wales Government Railways' standard gauge line at a break-of-gauge. A branch line was opened from Warwick to Killarney in 1885 (Killarney Branch). Another branch was opened from Wyreema (south of Toowoomba) to Pittsworth in 1887 and extended to Millmerran in 1911 (Millmerran Branch). A branch line was opened from Hendon to Allora and Goomburra in 1912 (Goomburra Branch). The South Western Railway was opened from Warwick to Thane in 1904 and extended to Dirranbandi in 1913. A branch line was built from Inglewood to Texas in 1930. A branch line was built from Ipswich to Harrisville in 1882, and extended to Boonah in 1884 and Fassifern in 1887. Another branch line was opened from Toowoomba to Cabarlah in 1883 and Crows Nest in 1886 (Crows Nest Branch). The Brisbane Valley railway line was built from Ipswich to Lowood in 1884, Esk in 1886 and Yarraman in 1913. Passenger services operated on the line until 1967, and freight services continued until the closure of the line in sections in 1988 and 1993. In 1912, a branch line to Marburg opened from Rosewood. It closed in sections between 1964 and 1995. Today some of it is the Rosewood Railway Museum; their Museum Junction station is at the truncated southern end of the line before Railway Street. A coal spur line was opened to Ebenezer, near Rosewood, in 1990.

Electrification from Ipswich was extended to Rosewood in 1993, creating the Citytrain interurban Rosewood railway line. This was while David Hamill was Minister for Transport; the Rosewood line extends from the seat he held, the electoral district of Ipswich (up to the Bremer River after Thomas Street station), into that of Ipswich West.

=== Lines in Maryborough, Bundaberg and Gladstone area ===
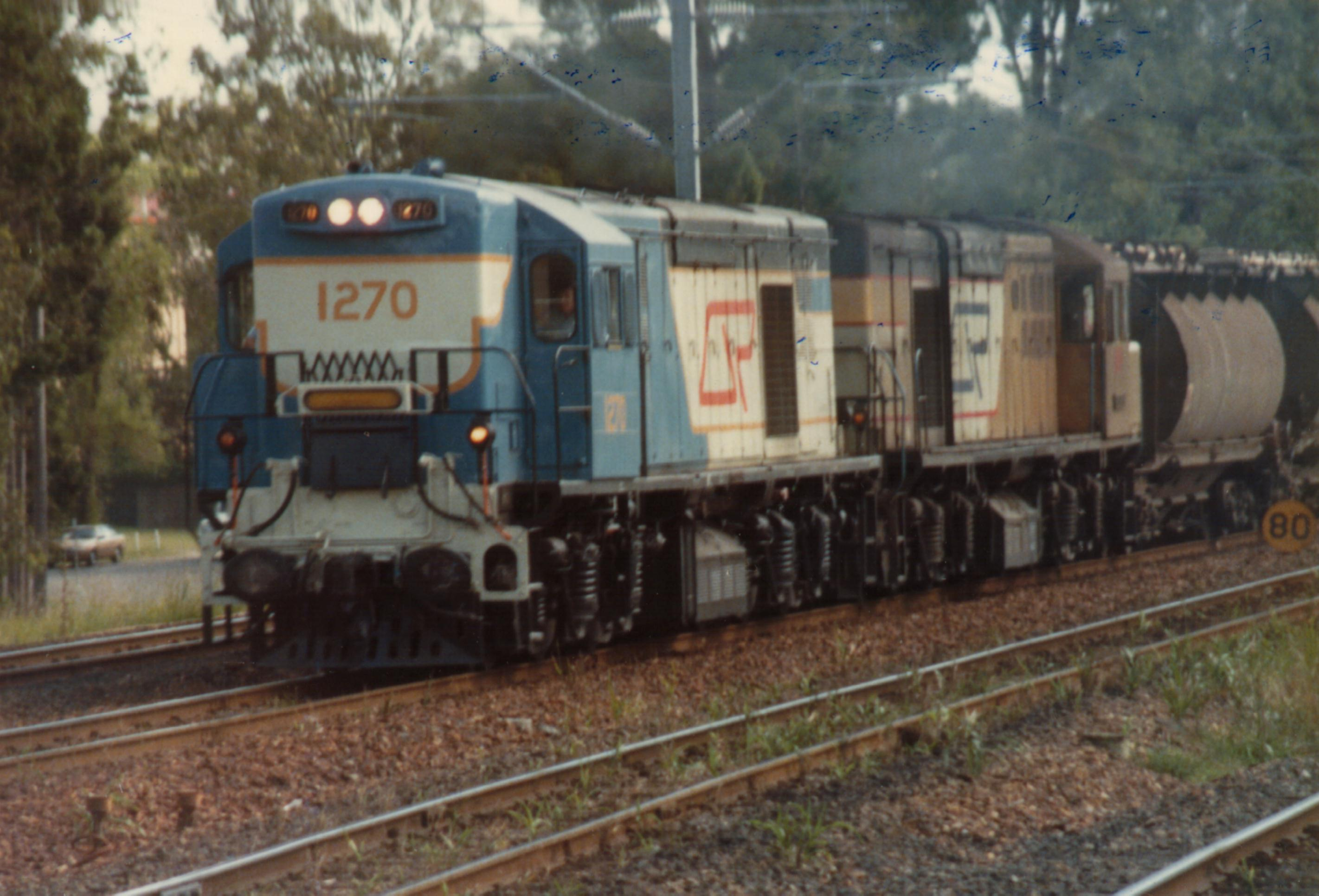
1270 class diesel locomotive approach Auchenflower station in 1985

A line was opened from Maryborough to Burrum Town Coalfield in 1883. Another line was opened to Theebine in 1886 and became part of the North Coast Line when it met with the line from Brisbane at Gympie in 1891. A branch line from Colton (slightly north of Maryborough) to Hervey Bay was opened in 1896, and was extended to Urangan in 1913. A branch line was opened from Theebine to Kilkivan in 1886 and extended to Goomeri in 1902. Another branch line was built from Theebine to Kingaroy in 1904 and Nanango in 1911. A branch line was opened between Kingaroy and Tarong in 1915, now abandoned.

A line was opened from north Bundaberg to Mount Perry in 1884. The Mount Perry railway line required the construction of the Boolboonda Tunnel. The tunnel is considered a rare and unusual engineering feat for early railway construction in Queensland. Maryborough and Bundaberg were connected in 1888, with a branch line from Isis Junction to Childers, extended to Cordalba in 1896 and Dallarnil in 1913. Another branch was opened from Mungar Junction to Biggenden in 1891, Degilbo in 1893, Gayndah in 1907, Mundubbera in 1914 and Monto in 1928 and Gladstone in 1931. The Maryborough-Bundaberg was connected by the Burnett River Bridge to the Mount Perry line in 1891. A line was opened from Gladstone to Iveragh in 1896 and connected to Mount Perry (and Brisbane) in 1897. The North Coast Line was extended from Gladstone to Rockhampton in 1903.

The Wallaville Branch left the Mount Perry line at Goondoon. It reached Wallaville on 9 August 1920, however the line was extended to Morganville on 3 October 1931. Queensland Railways sold the line in 1964 to the Gin Gin Cooperative Mill who converted it to a sugar tramway. A branch line was built from Byellee (in Gladstone) to Many Peaks in 1910. A branch line was opened from Bajool to Port Alma in 1912. A line was built from Gladstone to Mungungo in 1930 and extended to Monto in 1931. The Moura Short Line was opened between Gladstone and Moura in 1968, connecting to the branch lines from Rockhampton via Mount Morgan (Dawson Valley railway line) to the Moura and Callide coal fields.

=== Central line ===
A line was opened from Rockhampton to Westwood in 1867. It was extended to Gogango in 1874, Emerald in 1879, Barcaldine in 1886, Longreach in 1892 and Winton in 1928. A branch was built from |Emerald to Clermont in 1884 and extended to Blair Athol in 1910.

A branch line was opened from Emerald to Springsure in 1887. Another branch line was completed between Jericho and Blackall in 1908 and extended to Yaraka in 1917.

A heavy-haul railway line was built from Blackwater to the coal fields at Laleham in 1970.

A heavy-haul railway was built from Rangal (west of Blackwater) to the coal fields at Kinrola in 1967. This line was extended to the Rolleston coal mine in 2006. This is the first new non-urban railway in Queensland for 23 years, and reflects the upswing in coal demand as a result of the Chinese economic boom. Coal is to be moved to Gladstone by Xstrata trains.

A heavy-haul railway was opened from Burngrove west of Rangal to the Gregory coal mine in 1980 and extended to German Creek in 1982 and Norwich Park in 1983, connecting to Hay Point.

A branch line was built from Rockhampton to the coast at Emu Park in 1888. A branch was opened from a junction at Sleipner to Yeppoon in 1909.

Another branch line was opened from a junction at Kabra, near Rockhampton to Mount Morgan in 1898 (including a rack section) and extended to Wowan in 1912 and Baralaba in 1917. A branch line was built from a junction at Rannes to Thangool in 1925. A branch line was opened from a junction at Dakenba to Callide in 1953.

The first section of the North Coast Line north of Rockhampton was completed to Milman in 1913 and extended to Marlborough in 1917 and St Lawrence and Carmila in 1921, connecting to the line from Mackay.

=== Mackay, Proserpine, Bowen and Ayr lines ===
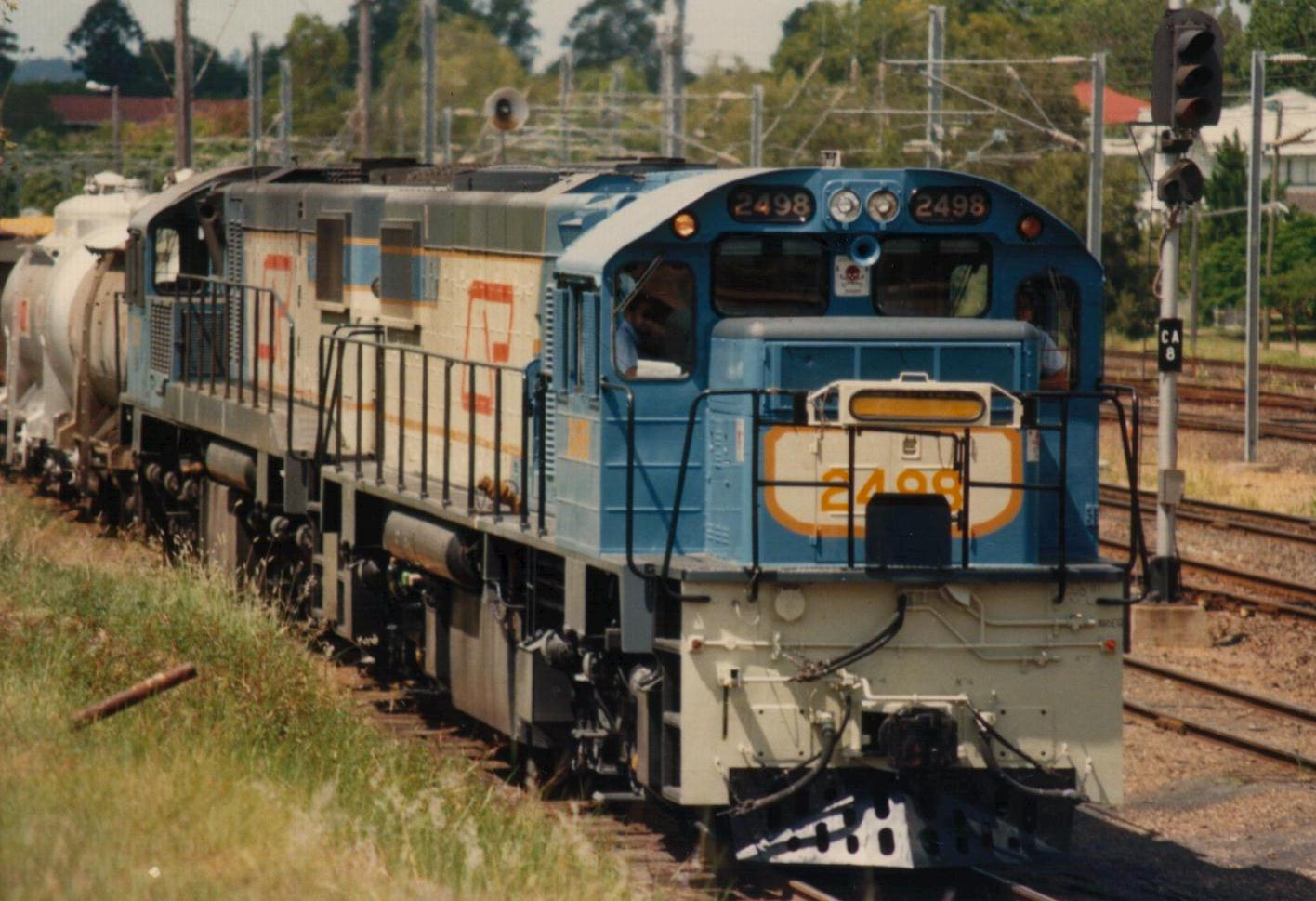
1550 class diesel locomotive on a freight service near Corinda station in 1998

Lines were opened from Mackay to Eton and Mirani in 1885. The Mirani line was extended to Pinnacle in 1902 and Netherdale in 1911.

Local governments built a section of the future North Coast Line from Townsville to Ayr in 1901, which was taken over by QR in 1911. This was extended to Bowen in 1913.

In 1910 local governments opened a line from Bowen to Proserpine and it was taken over by QR in 1917.

A section of the North Coast Line was completed from Mackay to Sarina in 1913 and extended to Koumala in 1920 and Carmila in 1921, connecting with the line from Brisbane. The line from Mackay to Proserpine was opened in 1923, completing the line from Brisbane to Townsville.

A line was opened from Merinda (near Bowen) to Collinsville in 1922 and extended to Newlands in 1984.

A heavy-haul railway was built from the new port at Hay Point (near Mackay) to the coal fields at Goonyella in 1971. A branch line was opened from Coppabella to Peak Downs in 1972 and extended to Saraji in 1974 and Norwich Park in 1979. Another branch line was opened from Wotonga (between Coppabella and Goonyella) to Blair Athol, connecting to Emerald in 1983.

=== Northern line ===
A line was opened from Townsville to Charters Towers in 1882, Hughenden in 1887 and Winton in 1899. A line was completed between Hughenden and Richmond in 1904 and extended to Cloncurry in 1908 and Selwyn in 1910. A branch was completed from Cloncurry to Mount Cuthbert in 1915. Another branch was opened from Cloncurry to Dajarra in 1917. A branch, which became the mainline, was opened from Duchess to Mount Isa in 1929. A line was opened from Flynn (near Duchess) to the phosphate mine at Phosphate Hill in 1976.

A branch line was built from Mingela (between Townsville and Charters Towers) to Ravenswood in 1884, but is now closed.

A line was opened from Cobarra, north of Townsville, to the nickel mine at Greenvale in 1974, and closed in 1993 with the closure of the mine.

=== Cairns line ===
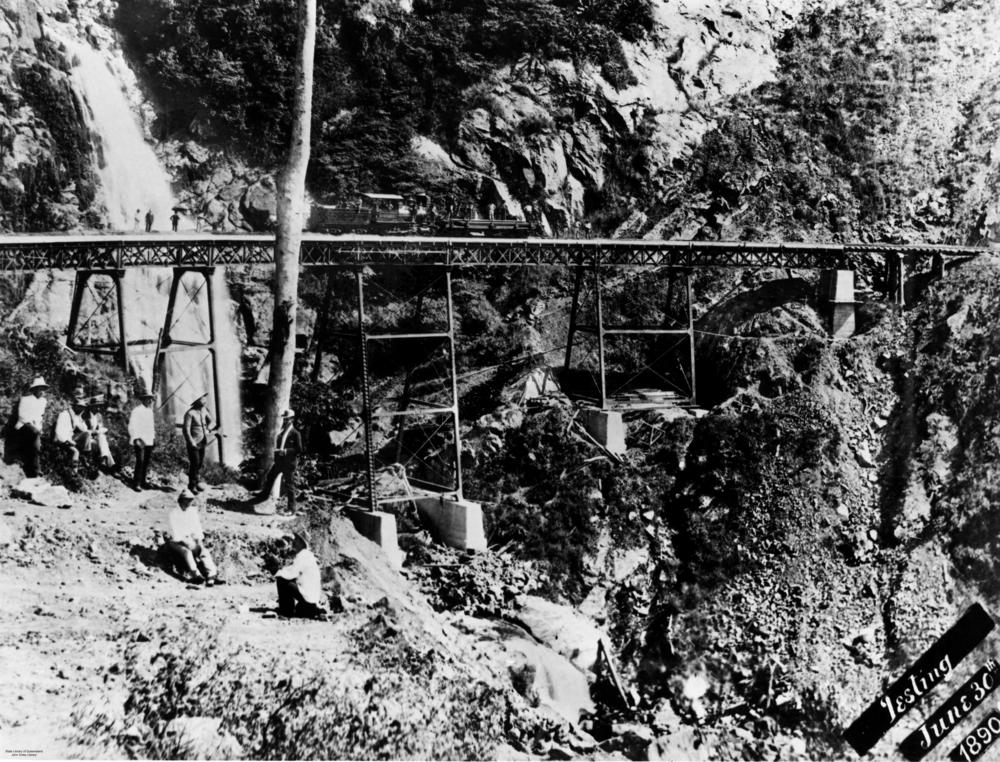
Testing of the line from Cairns to Kuranda, 1890

A line was opened from Cairns to Redlynch in 1887 and extended up the Barron Gorge to Kuranda and Myola in 1891, Mareeba in 1893, Atherton in 1903, Herberton in 1910, Tumoulin in 1911 and Ravenshoe in 1916.

A private railway was completed, by the Chillagoe Railway and Mining Company, between Mareeba and Mungana in 1901. The system was extended from Lappa Junction to Mount Garnet in 1902. A line was then constructed from Almaden to Mount Surprise in 1908 reaching Einasleigh in 1909 and finally Forsayth in 1911. A branch to Mount Mulligan was constructed in 1915. The rail assets of the Chillagoe Company were handed over to the Queensland Government in 1919.

The Cairns-Mulgrave Tramway from Cairns to Babinda was operated by the Cairns Divisional Board (a forerunner of the present Cairns Regional Council) until 1911 when it was acquired by Queensland Railways.

The first section of the North Coast Line was opened from Babinda, south to Pawngilly in 1912. The line was completed between Townsville and Cairns in 1924.

=== Cooktown line ===
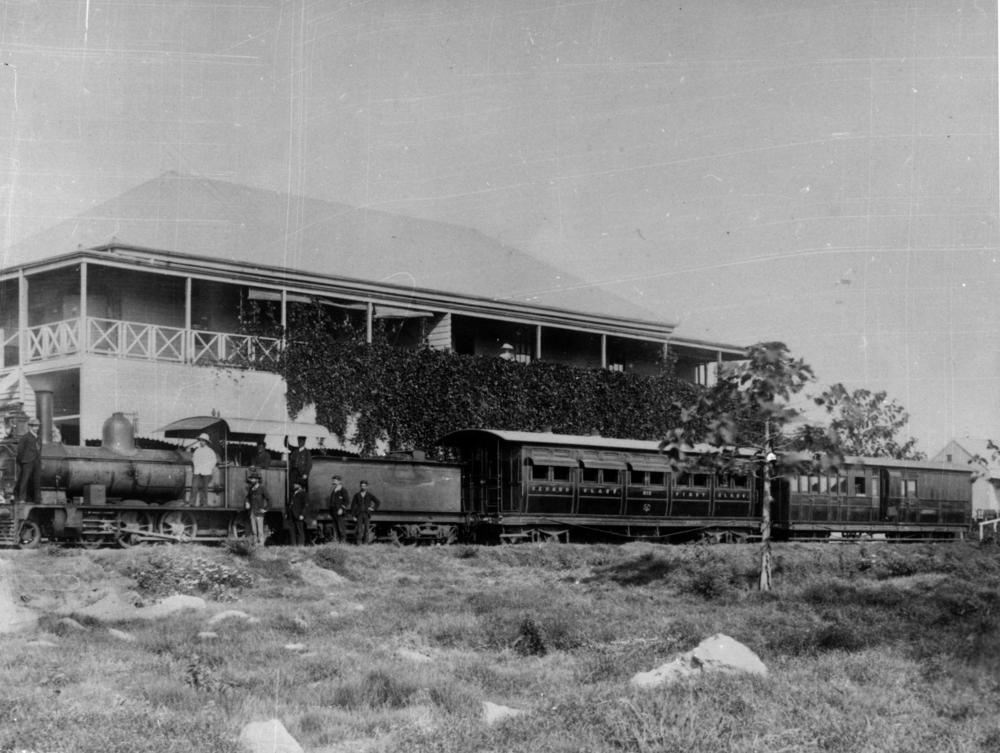
Cooktown Station ~1889

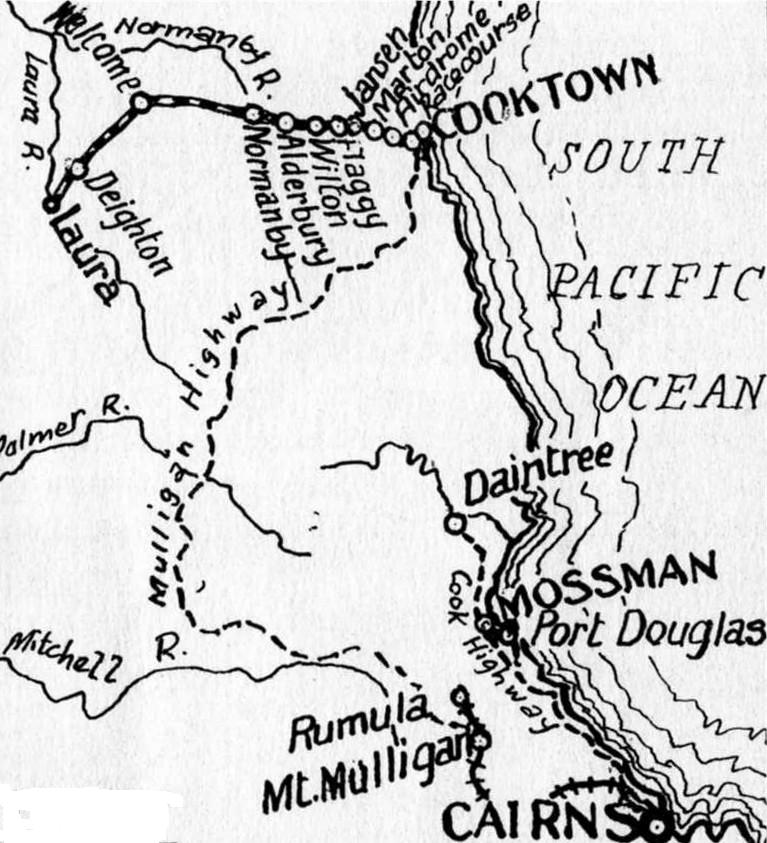
Map of Cooktown Railway

Following the Palmer gold rush of 1873, the largest in Queensland, an isolated line opened between Cooktown and Palmer Road in 1885, and extended to Laura in 1888. The line featured 1 in 25 (4%) grades and construction paused at Laura, junction for the 3 regional tracks, as there was a dispute about the best place to terminate the line, and the preferred alignment would require significant earthworks, including 8 tunnels.

Although Parliament approved the construction of a further 48 kilometres (30 mi) of the line in 1888, the pause resulted in the subsequent economic downturn depriving the project of construction funds. The exception was the construction of the bridge over the Laura River, which was built by day labour. No rails were laid beyond the bridge, and it was only used by the occasional excursion train as a feature of the excursion. A pier and 2 spans were destroyed in a flood in 1940, and the remaining 3 spans were sold to a sugar tramway in the 1950s.

The line was closed in January 1903, but the Cook Shire Council arranged to lease it and operated it until July 1904, when QR resumed operating it. In 1927 all locomotives were withdrawn and the line was operated solely by a railmotor, which could haul up to two 4 wheel goods wagons if necessary. The line closed permanently in 1961.

=== Normanton to Croydon railway ===
Another isolated railway, from Normanton to Haydon, was opened in 1889 and extended to Croydon on 7 July 1891.

The line had been intended to connect Cloncurry to the river port at Normanton, but the discovery of gold at Croydon in 1886 resulted in the line being diverted to the latter destination. The gold rush ended soon after the line was opened, and Cloncurry was not connected to a port (in this case Townsville) until 1908.

The line was built with steel sleepers to be termite-proof, and as this resulted in the line being virtually maintenance free (for the level of traffic involved), it is the main reason the line has survived, although closure was proposed several times. In 1929 locomotive use ceased and the weekly service was provided by a railmotor. It is still operating, run mainly for tourists and called the Gulflander.

=== Other lines ===
For the location of sections referring to branch lines embedded in other articles, see the Articles list

== See also ==
- Rail transport in Queensland
- Rail transport in Australia
- Abraham Fitzgibbon
