= List of railway lines approved by the Queensland Parliament but never constructed =

This is a list of the known railway proposals in Queensland, Australia, either formally approved by the Queensland Parliament or otherwise recorded in some formal way, that were never built.

== Approved by Parliament ==
- Laura – 48 km towards Maytown, approved 1888
- Croydon – 85 km towards Georgetown, approved 1895, being the amount of rail in storage at Croydon following the diversion of the line from Cloncurry. The rail was later used to construct part of the Mt Isa line to Cloncurry.
- Gladstone – Callide Coalfields, approved 1900. A different line to Callide Coalfields was built in 1952 via the Callide Valley line, and connected to Gladstone in 1968 when the Moura Short Line was opened.
- Miriam Vale – Glassford copper mine, approved 1900
- Great Western Railway and connecting lines, approved 1910
- Via Recta (Mt Edwards – Maryvale), proposed to provide a direct Brisbane – Warwick line, approved 1914
- Burketown – Lawn Hill silver mine, approved 1914
- Wandoan – Taroom, approved 1914
- Extension of the South Western line from Dirranbandi to Boomi (New South Wales), approved 1914.
- Extension of the Brisbane Valley railway line from Yarraman to Nanango, approved 1914
- Texas – Silver Spur mine, approved 1914
- Glenmorgan – Surat, approved 1914
- Lawgi – Monto, approved 1920
- Brooloo – Kenilworth, approved 1920
- Dobbyn – 80 km towards Burketown, approved 1920
- Peeramon – Boonjie, approved 1920
- Croydon – Georgetown, approved 1929.

== Other proposals ==
- Cooyar – Tarong, mentioned in the parliamentary approval debate concerning the Tarong line
- Rosewood – Rosevale, shown on a 1925 map as ‘Approved of by Parliament’
- Gatton – Mount Sylvia, shown on a 1925 map as ‘Approved of by Parliament’

== See also ==
- Rail transport in Queensland
