= Giru railway station =

Railway station in Queensland, Australia

Giru
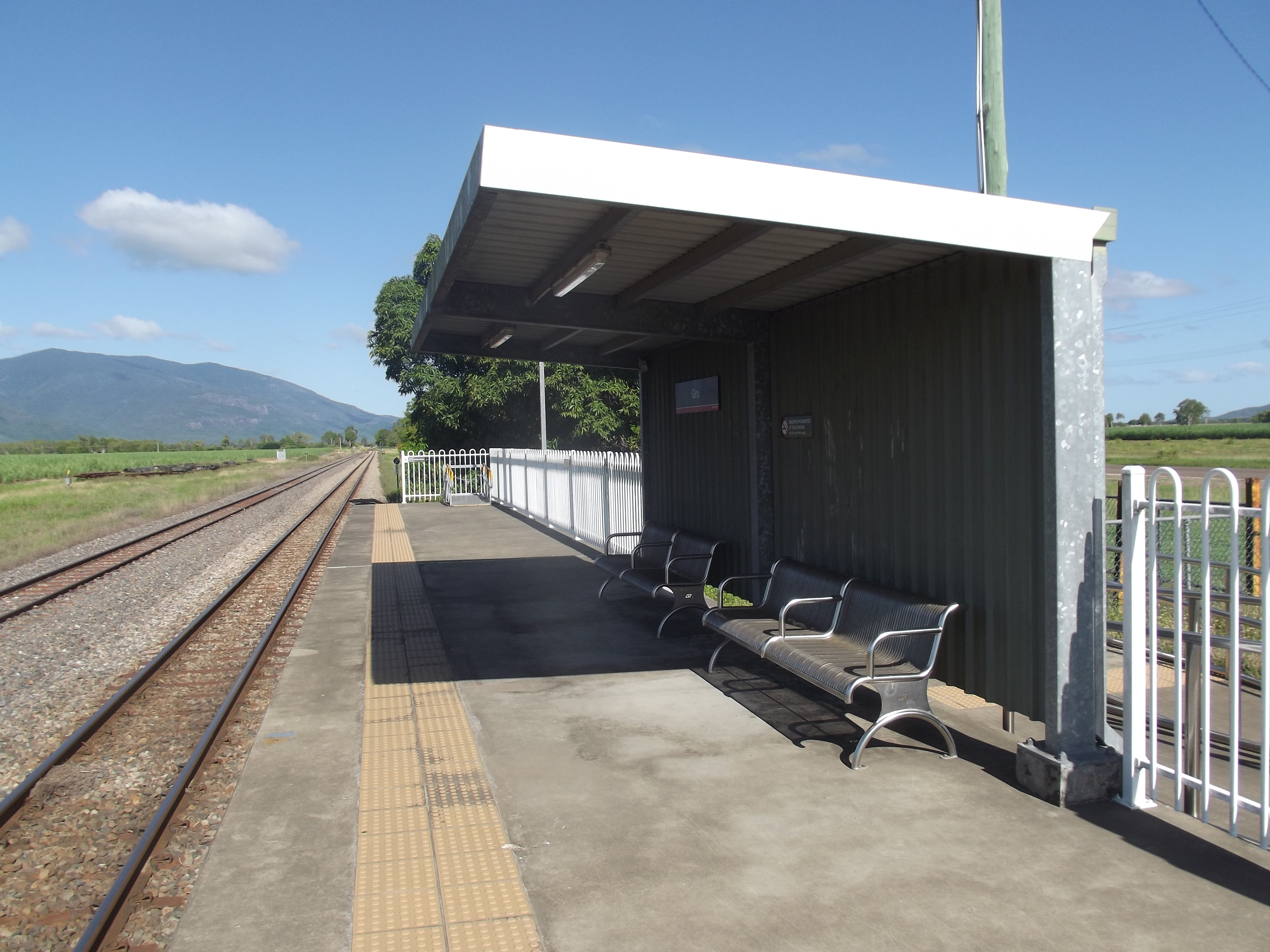
- Northbound view in January 2013

General information
- Location: Donaghue Street, Giru
- Coordinates: 19.5116°S 147.1051°E
- Owner: Queensland Rail
- Operator: Traveltrain
- Line: North Coast
- Distance: 1292.86 kilometres from Central
- Platforms: 1
- Tracks: 2

Construction
- Structure type: Ground
- Accessible: Yes

Services
| Preceding station | Queensland Rail | Following station |
|---|---|---|
| Ayr towards Brisbane | Spirit of Queensland | Townsville towards Cairns |
Location

Giru railway station is located on the North Coast line in Queensland, Australia. It serves the town of Giru. The station has one platform. Opposite the platform lies a passing loop.

== Services ==
Giru is served by Traveltrain's Spirit of Queensland service.
