= Bowen railway station =

Railway station in Queensland, Australia

Bowen
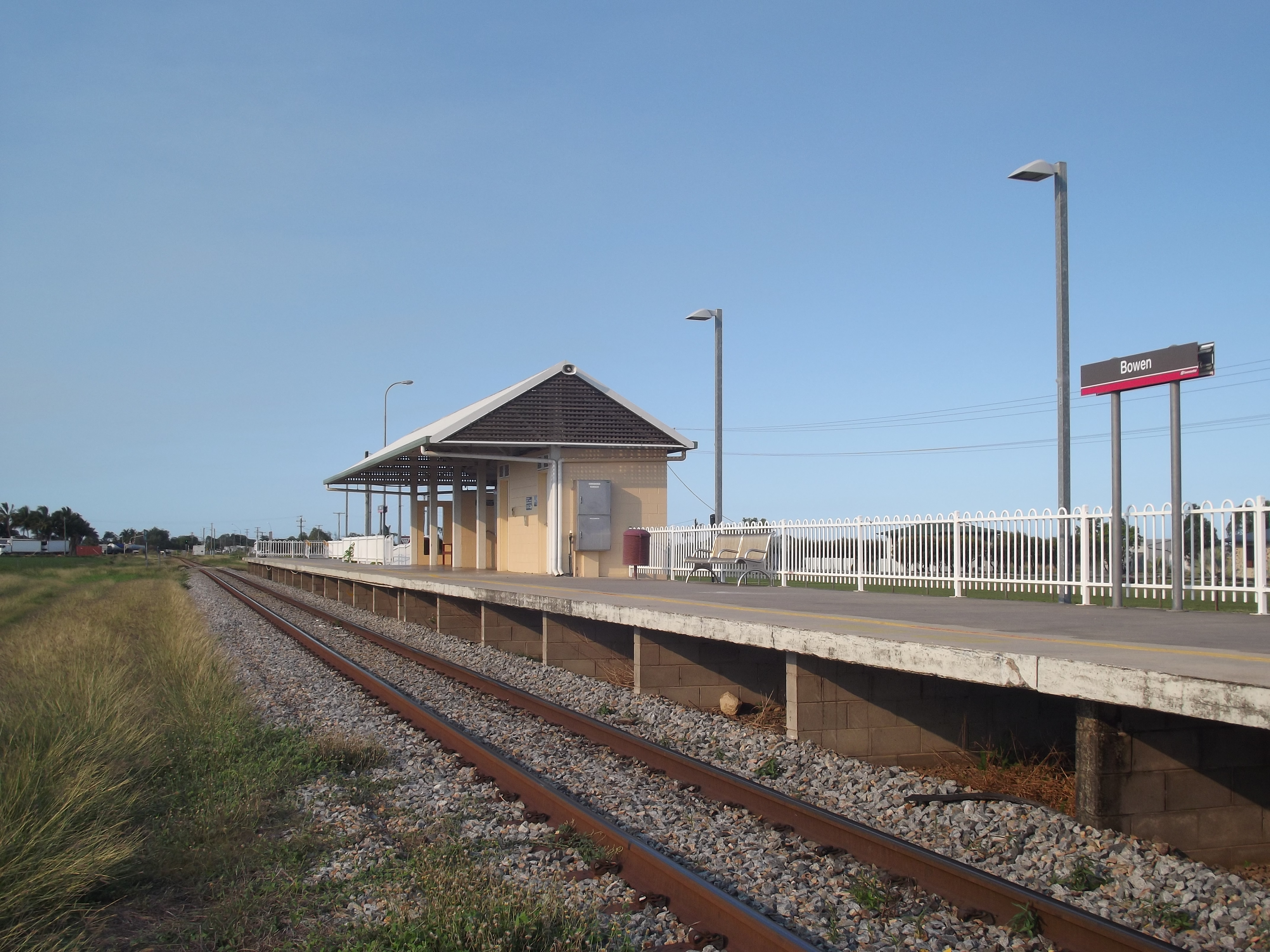
- Station in January 2013

General information
- Location: 65 Bootooloo Road, Bowen
- Coordinates: 20.0217°S 148.2058°E
- Owner: Queensland Rail
- Operator: Traveltrain
- Line: North Coast
- Distance: 1149.06 kilometres from Central
- Platforms: 1
- Tracks: 1

Construction
- Structure type: Ground
- Accessible: Yes

Services
Preceding station	Queensland Rail	Following station
Proserpine towards Brisbane	Spirit of Queensland	Home Hill towards Cairns
Location

Bowen railway station is located on the North Coast line in Queensland, Australia. It serves the town of Bowen. The station has one platform.

== Services ==
Bowen is served by Traveltrain's Spirit of Queensland service.
