= Surat Basin railway =

Surat Basin
Overview
- Dates of operation: Proposed–

The Surat Basin Railway is a proposed 210-kilometre (130 mi) freight railway in Queensland, Australia. It is planned to connect the Western railway line near Wandoan which is 230 kilometres (140 mi) north west of Toowoomba with the Moura railway line, near Banana, 130 kilometres (81 mi) west of Gladstone.

The aim of the project is to facilitate the export of coal from the developing Surat Basin and freight through to the Port of Gladstone. The proposal is still in the feasibility stage and is being developed by The Surat Basin Railway Joint Venture, which comprises the Australian Transport and Energy Corridor Pty Ltd (ATEC), Xstrata Coal and Queensland Rail (QR). It is estimated that it will cost up to A$1.2 billion and employ a workforce of up to 600 over a 2 1/2-year construction period.

The project was often previously referred to as the "Southern Missing Link". Due to global market conditions and the status of other infrastructure and mining projects in the region, the timeframe for the construction of the railway is still to be finalised.

== See also ==
- Construction of Queensland railways
