= Townsville railway station =

Railway station in Queensland, Australia

Townsville
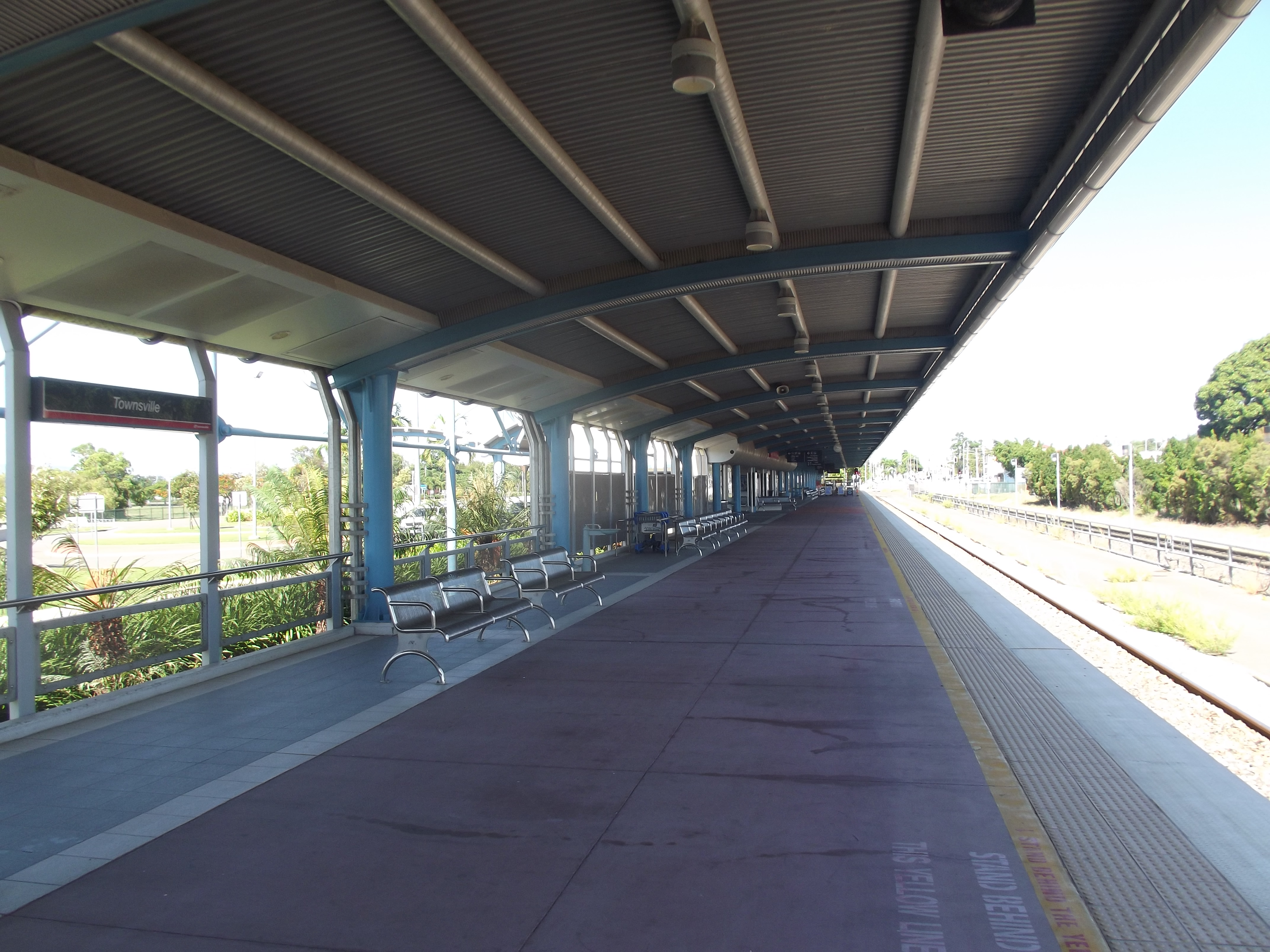
- Southbound view in January 2013

General information
- Location: Charters Towers Road, Townsville City, Queensland; Australia
- Coordinates: 19.2693°S 146.8080°E
- Owner: Queensland Rail
- Operator: Traveltrain
- Lines: North Coast; Great Northern
- Platforms: 1
- Tracks: 2

Construction
- Structure type: Ground
- Accessible: Yes

History
- Opened: May 2003

Services
Preceding station	Queensland Rail	Following station
Long distance rail services
Giru towards Brisbane	Spirit of Queensland	Ingham towards Cairns
Terminus	The Inlander	Charters Towers towards Mount Isa
Location

Townsville railway station is located on the North Coast line in Queensland, Australia. It serves the city of Townsville. The station has one platform. Opposite the platform lies a passing loop. It is also the starting point for the Great Northern line to Mount Isa.

== History ==
The present station opened in May 2003, to replace the Old Townsville railway station in Flinders Street. At this time, rail tracks through the city centre were removed.

== Services ==
Townsville is served by Traveltrain's North Coast Line and Outback Services

- PC94 Spirit of Queensland Service from Roma Street to Cairns
- P987 Spirit of Queensland Service from Cairns to Roma Street
- 3M34 Inlander service from Townsville to Mount Isa
- 3936 Inlander service from Mount Isa to Townsville
