= Ayr railway station, Queensland =

Railway station in Queensland, Australia

Ayr
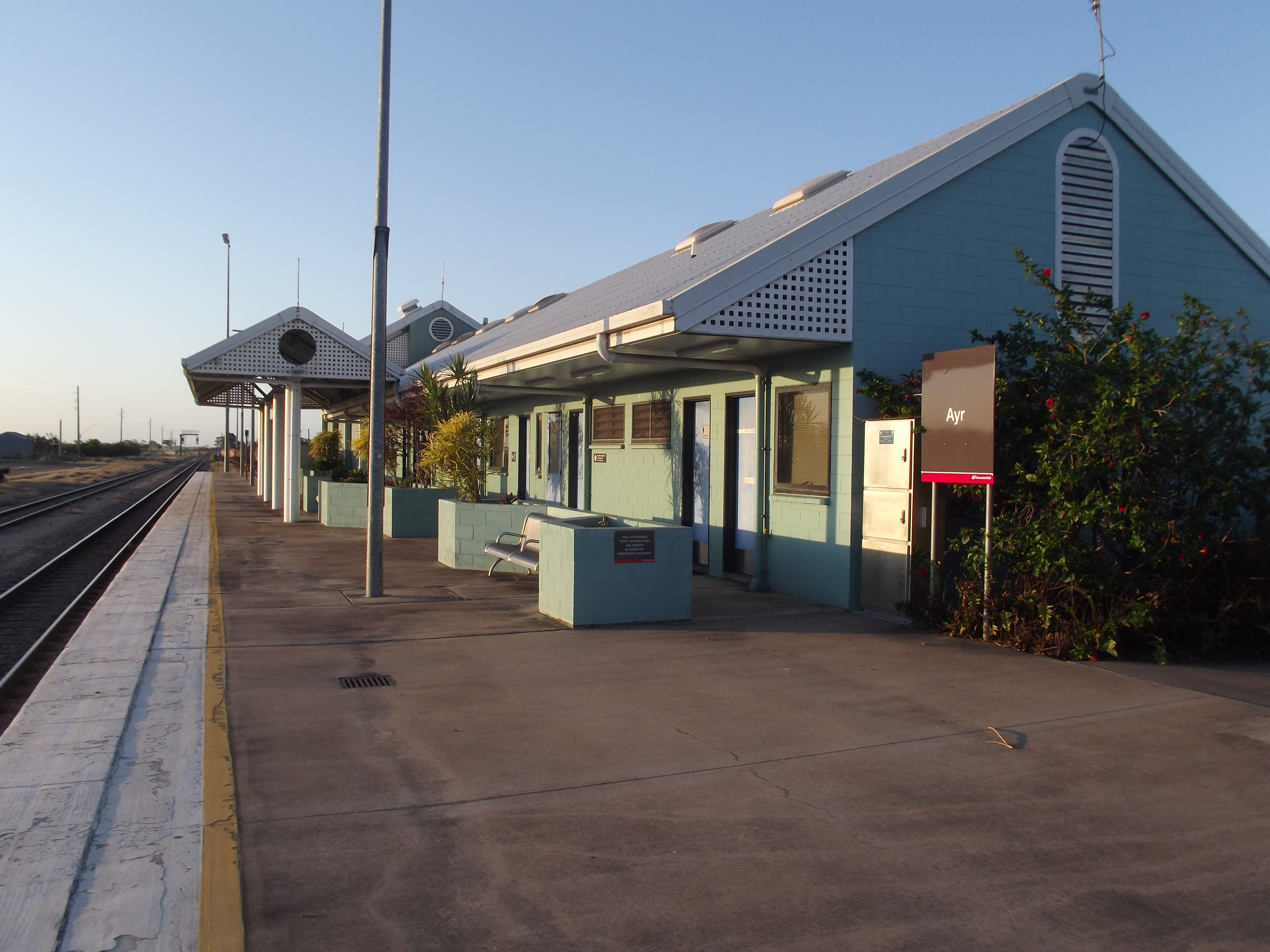
- Northbound view in January 2013

General information
- Location: Railway Street, Ayr
- Coordinates: 19.57399°S 147.3956°E
- Owner: Queensland Rail
- Operator: Traveltrain
- Line: North Coast
- Distance: 1259.65 kilometres from Central
- Platforms: 1
- Tracks: 2

Construction
- Structure type: Ground
- Accessible: Yes

Services
Preceding station	Queensland Rail	Following station
Home Hill towards Brisbane	Spirit of Queensland	Giru towards Cairns
Location

Ayr railway station is located on the North Coast line in Queensland, Australia. It serves the town of Ayr. The station has one platform. Opposite the platform lies a passing loop.

Ayr and Home Hill are the two closest stations on the North Coast line, being only 11 kilometres apart.

== Services ==
Ayr is served by Traveltrain's Spirit of Queensland service.
