= The Inlander (Queensland Rail) =

Rail service in Queensland, Australia

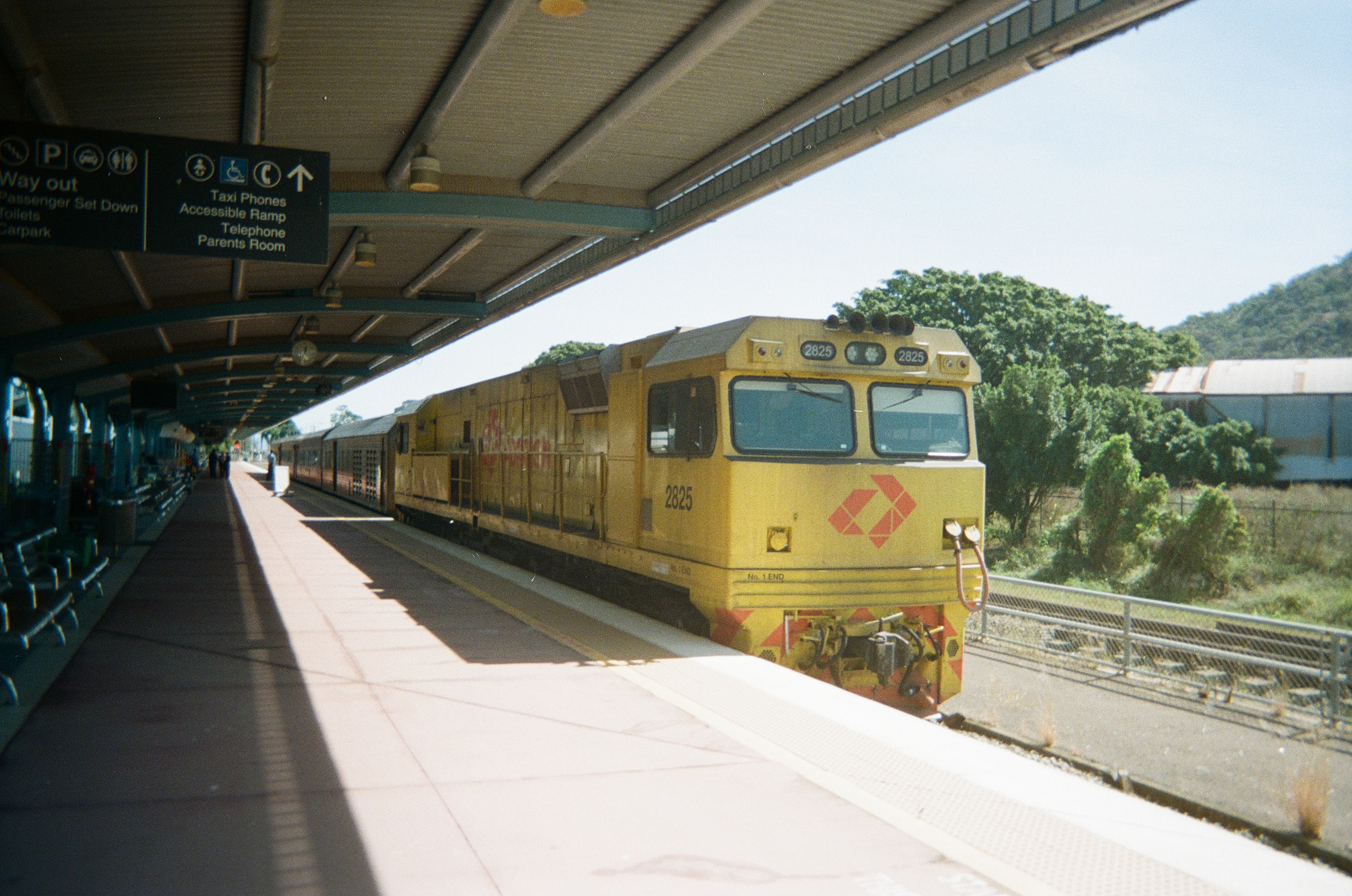
- The Inlander at Townsville railway station in June 2025, preparing to depart for Mount Isa

Overview
- Service type: Passenger train
- Status: Operational
- First service: 21 February 1953
- Current operator: Queensland Rail
- Website: https://www.queenslandrailtravel.com.au/Railexperiences/ourtrains/inlander

Route
- Termini: Townsville; Mount Isa
- Distance travelled: 977 kilometres (607 mi)
- Average journey time: 21 hours
- Service frequency: Twice per week

The Inlander is a passenger train that operates between Townsville and Mount Isa on the Great Northern railway line in Queensland, Australia. It was introduced by Queensland Rail on 12 February 1953 using new steel air-conditioned carriages built by Commonwealth Engineering, Rocklea.

== History ==
In the early 1950s, Queensland Rail began planning for a new generation of steel air-conditioned carriages. Consequently, work was started on one at Ipswich Workshops, with a further 8 ordered from Commonwealth Engineering. Ten diesel locomotives were to be imported from America to haul these carriages. It was proposed the first train would serve the Townsville to Mount Isa route, with a tentative start date of June 1952. On 5 June 1952, it was announced this service would be called The Inlander.

It was announced in January 1953 the new train would be ready the following month, departing Brisbane on the 4th of February, reaching Townsville on 7th to operate the maiden run of The Inlander. Having been hindered by heavy rain, it finally departed Townsville for Mount Isa on 12 February 1953.

Upon introduction, the train was made up of a power car, equipped with diesel generators to supply power to the rest of the carriages, passengers cars and mail/luggage vans. There were four classes of travel available: first class sleepers (2 berths per compartment), second class sleeper (3 berths), first class sitting and second class sitting. From this there were 6 carriage types: one of each class, as well as two composite carriages with both classes of sleeper or both classes of seats. There was also a dining carriage.

Similar carriages remained on this train until the end of 2014, when the sleeper and dining cars were withdrawn, having reached the end of their service life.

== Service ==
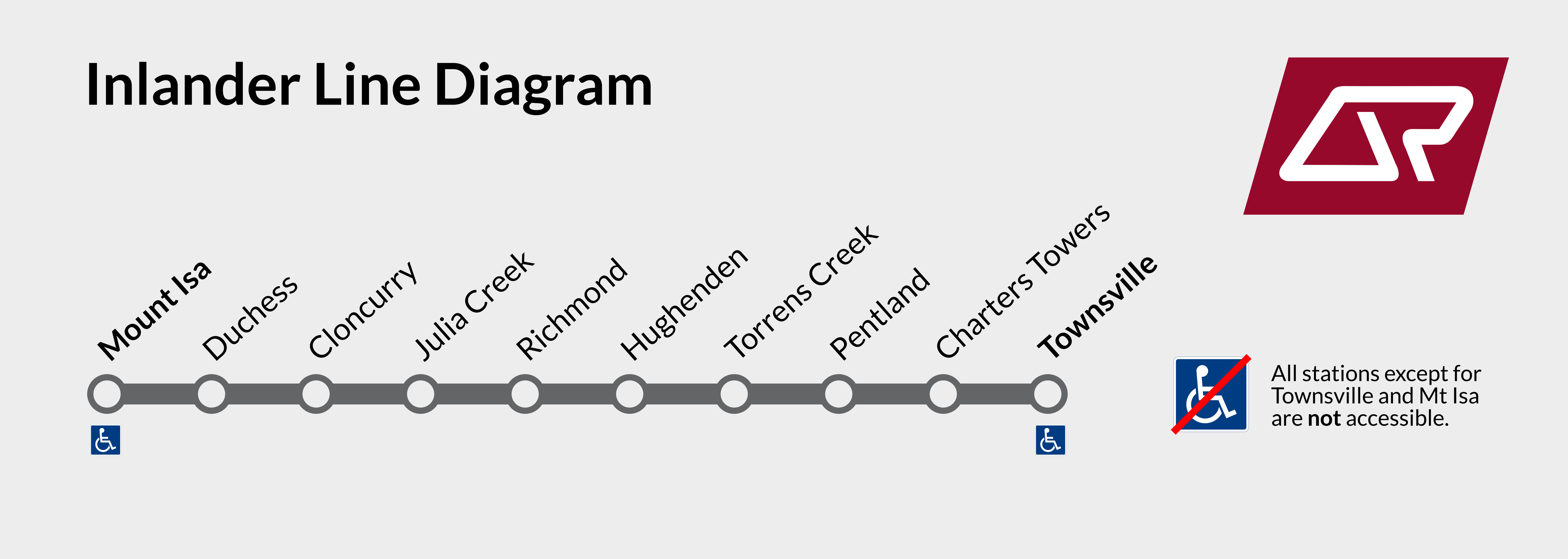
Route diagram of The Inlander

The service currently operates twice-weekly on the Great Northern line from the coastal city of Townsville to the mining city of Mount Isa. The train is relatively slow, taking 21 hours (overnight) to complete a journey of 977 kilometres.

The westbound service (3M34) departs Townsville railway station at 12:40 pm on Wednesdays and Saturdays and arrives at Mount Isa railway station at 9:35 am on Thursdays and Sundays. The eastbound service (3231) departs Mount Isa station at 1:30 pm on Thursdays and Sundays and arrives at Townsville station at 10:10 am on Fridays and Mondays.

The current train operates with three carriages: a lounge carriage and two passenger carriages. The lounge carriage is mostly made up of a crew only area, however there are 8 seats and a self-service tea and coffee station at the rear. Carriage A has 36 economy seats in a 2x1 configuration. Carriage B has a further 48 economy seats in a 2x2 configuration. Both A and B have a shower and two toilets.

Now that there is no longer a buffet car, a complimentary snack pack is brought to each passenger at meal times. Additional snacks and drinks can be purchased from the crew.

On 16 June 2021, a $1 million business case was announced by the Queensland government to investigate replacement of The Westlander, Spirit of the Outback and Inlander services' rolling stock.

== Subsidy levels ==
In 2016, the service was estimated to have carried 4,511 people in the previous financial year, with the effective subsidy paid by the Queensland government for each passenger amounting to an estimated $3,436 (total subsidy $15.5 million).

In 2021, the service carried 2,833 people in the previous financial year, with the effective subsidy paid by the Queensland government for each passenger at $5,086.06.

== Gallery ==
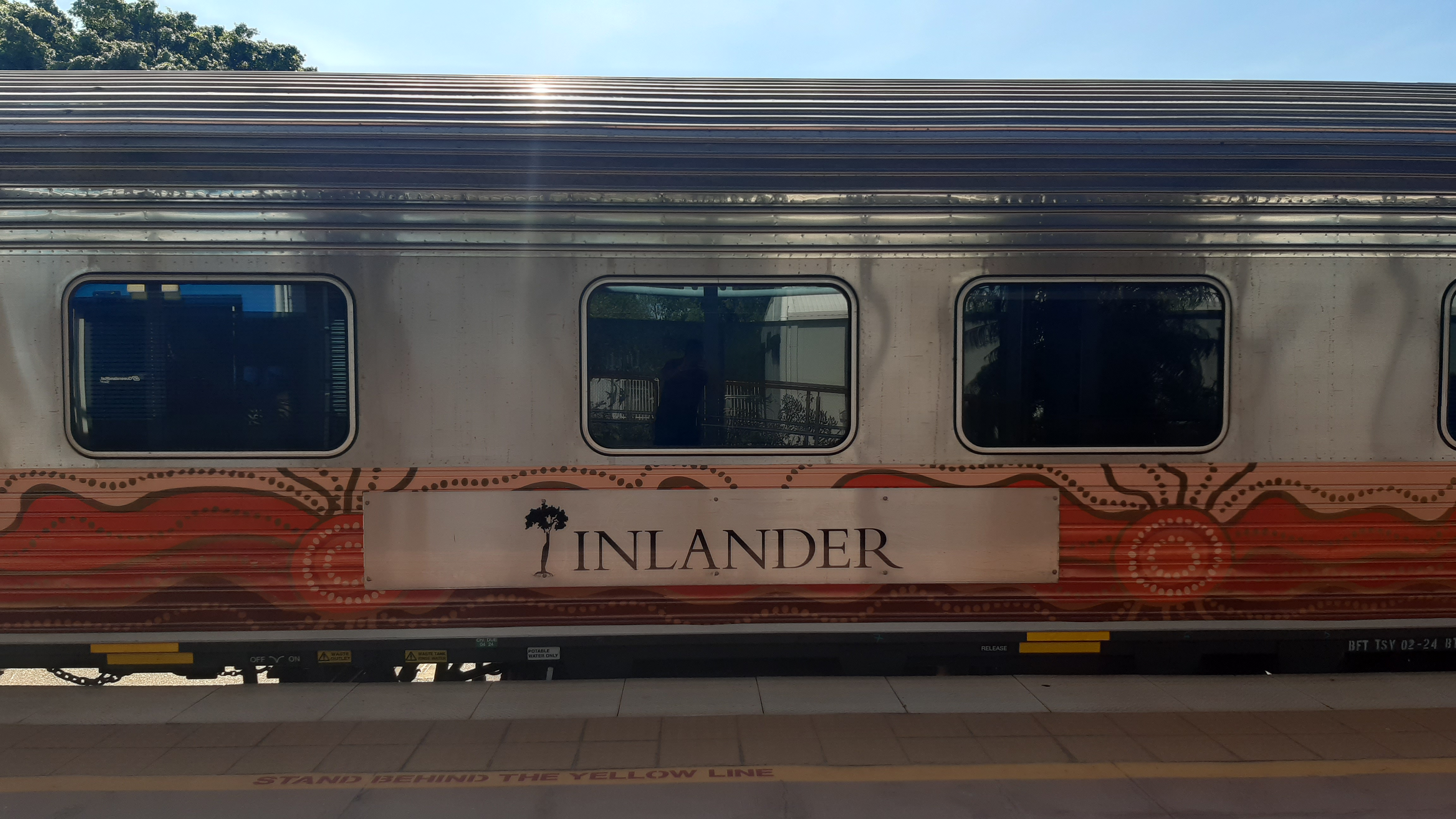
Logo on train

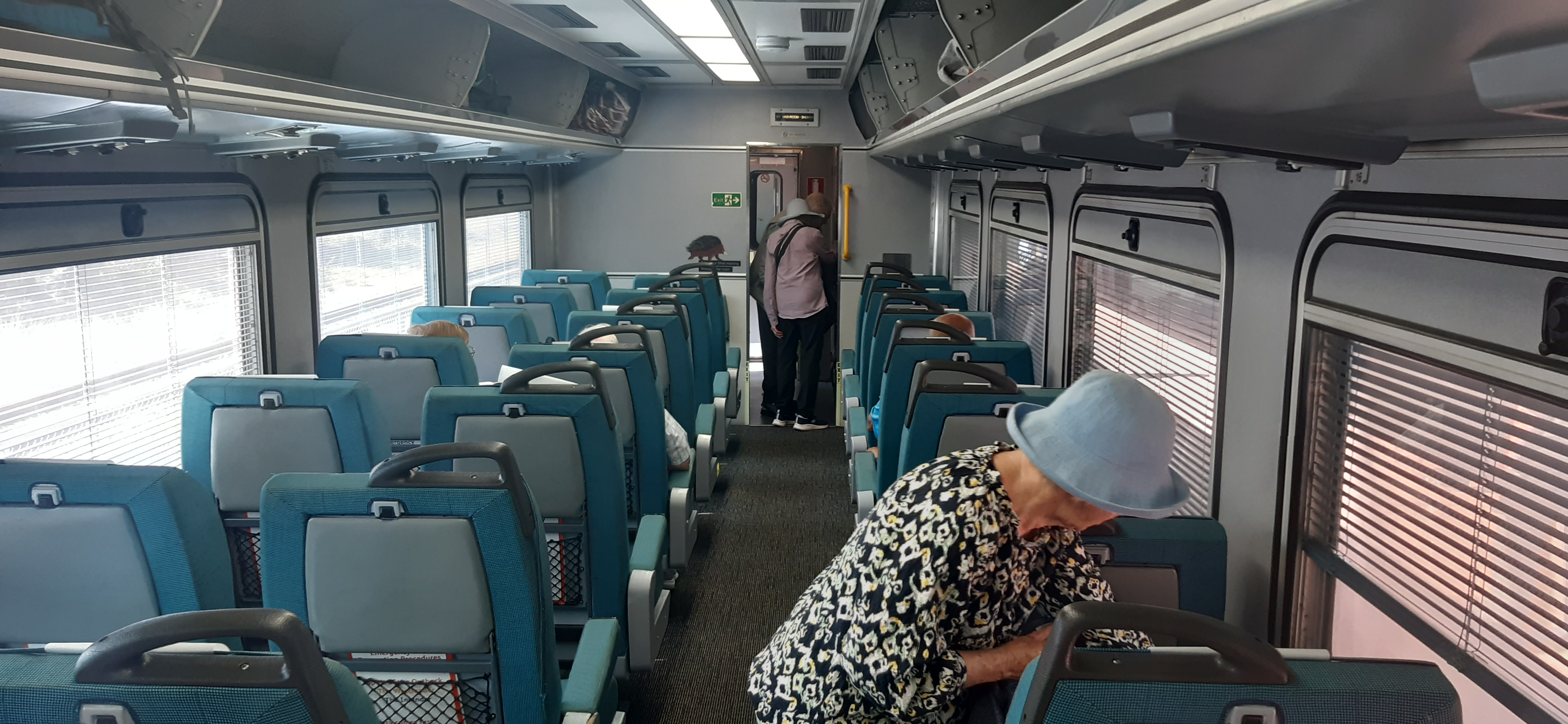
Interior view as passengers prepare to depart Townsville

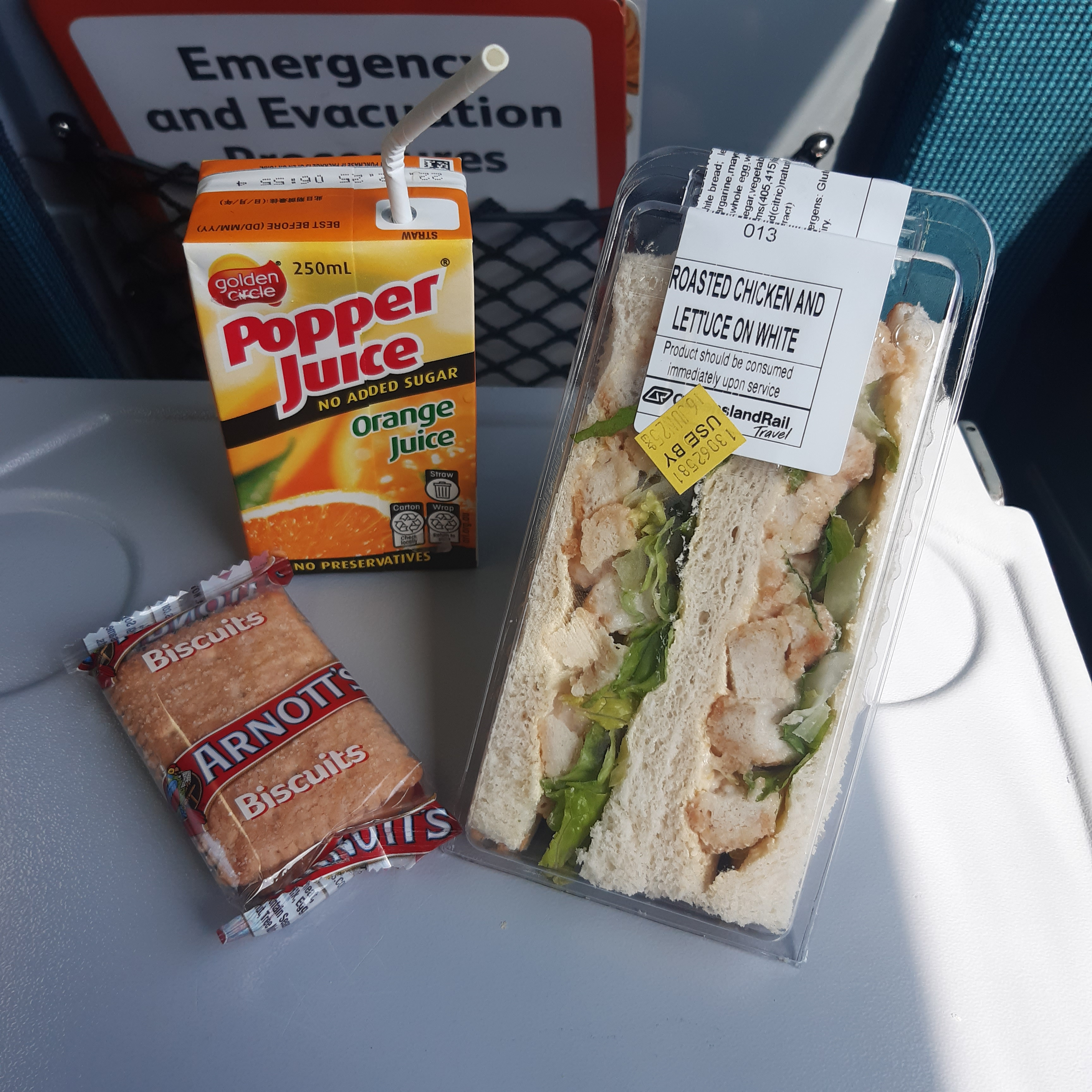
Lunch as provided onboard

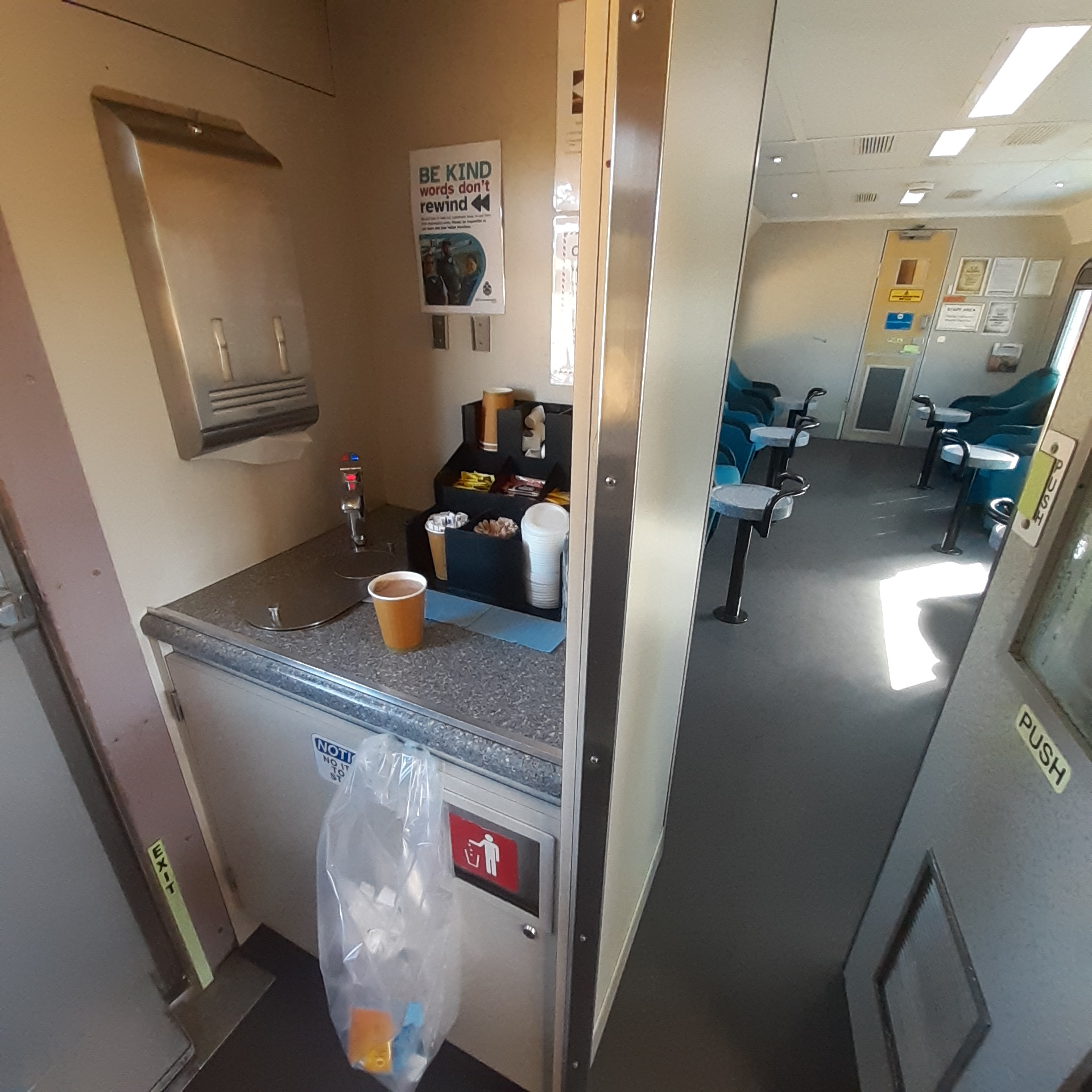
Self-service tea and coffee station onboard

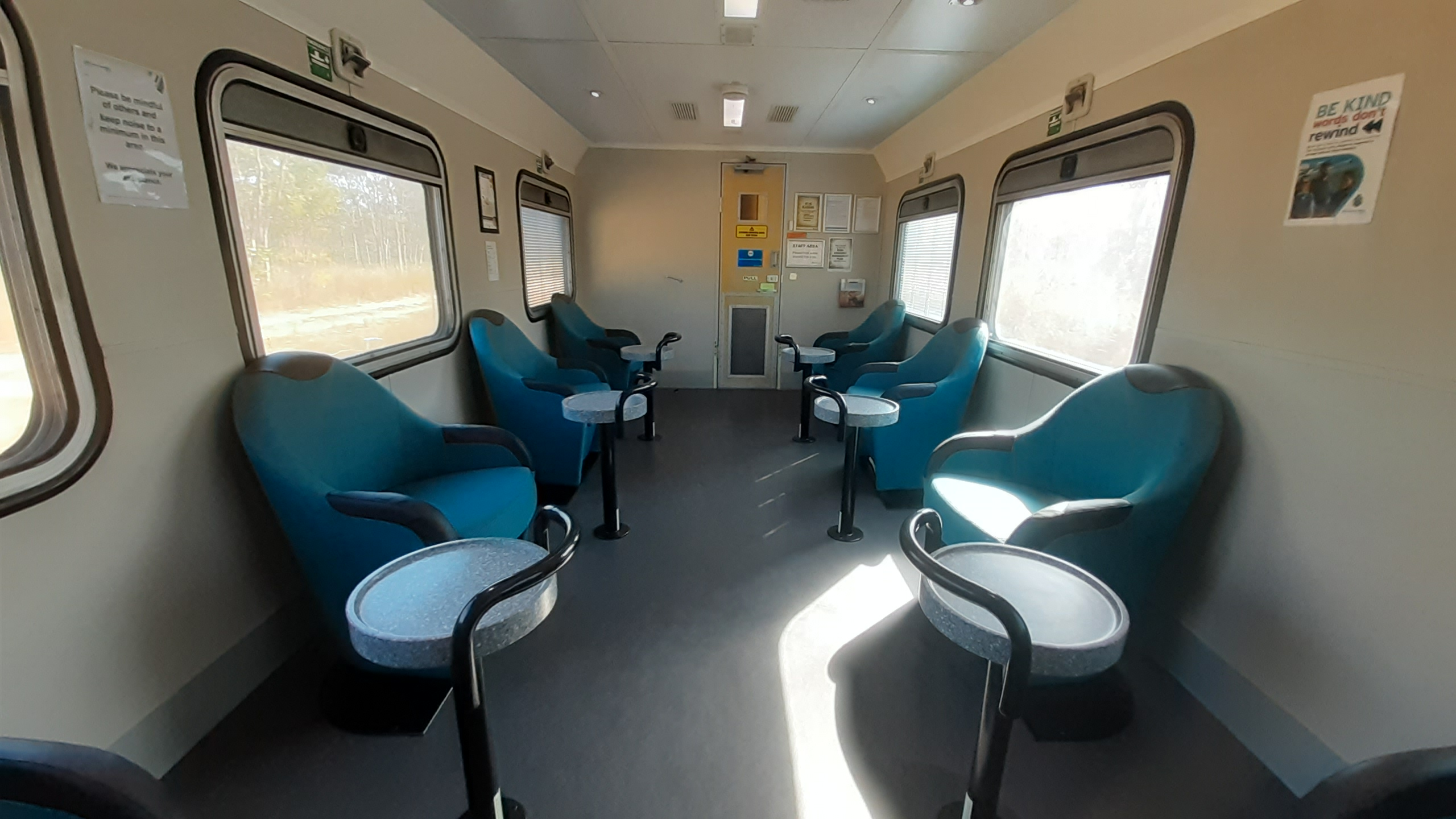
Dining and viewing room on the train

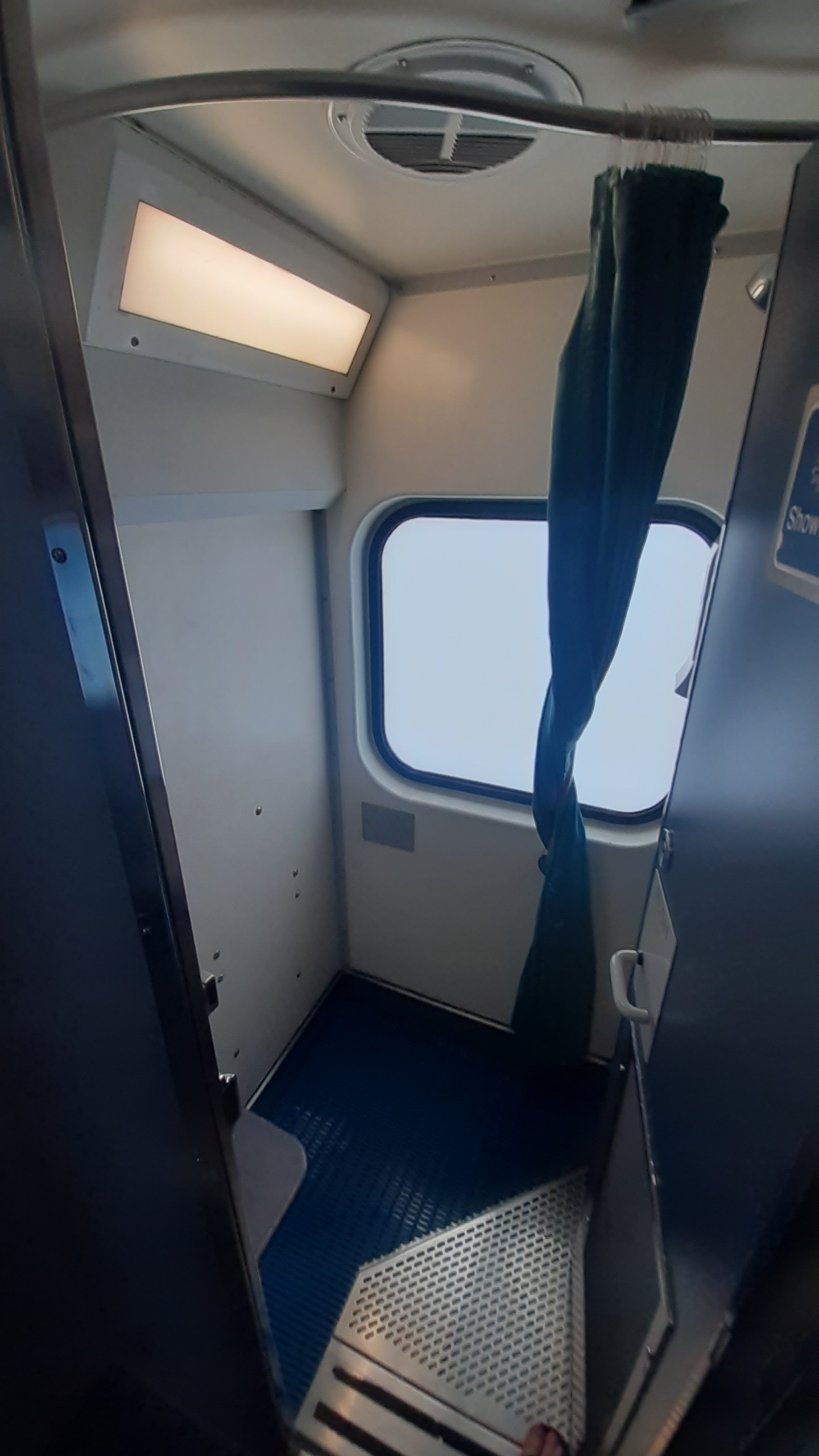
Shower onboard

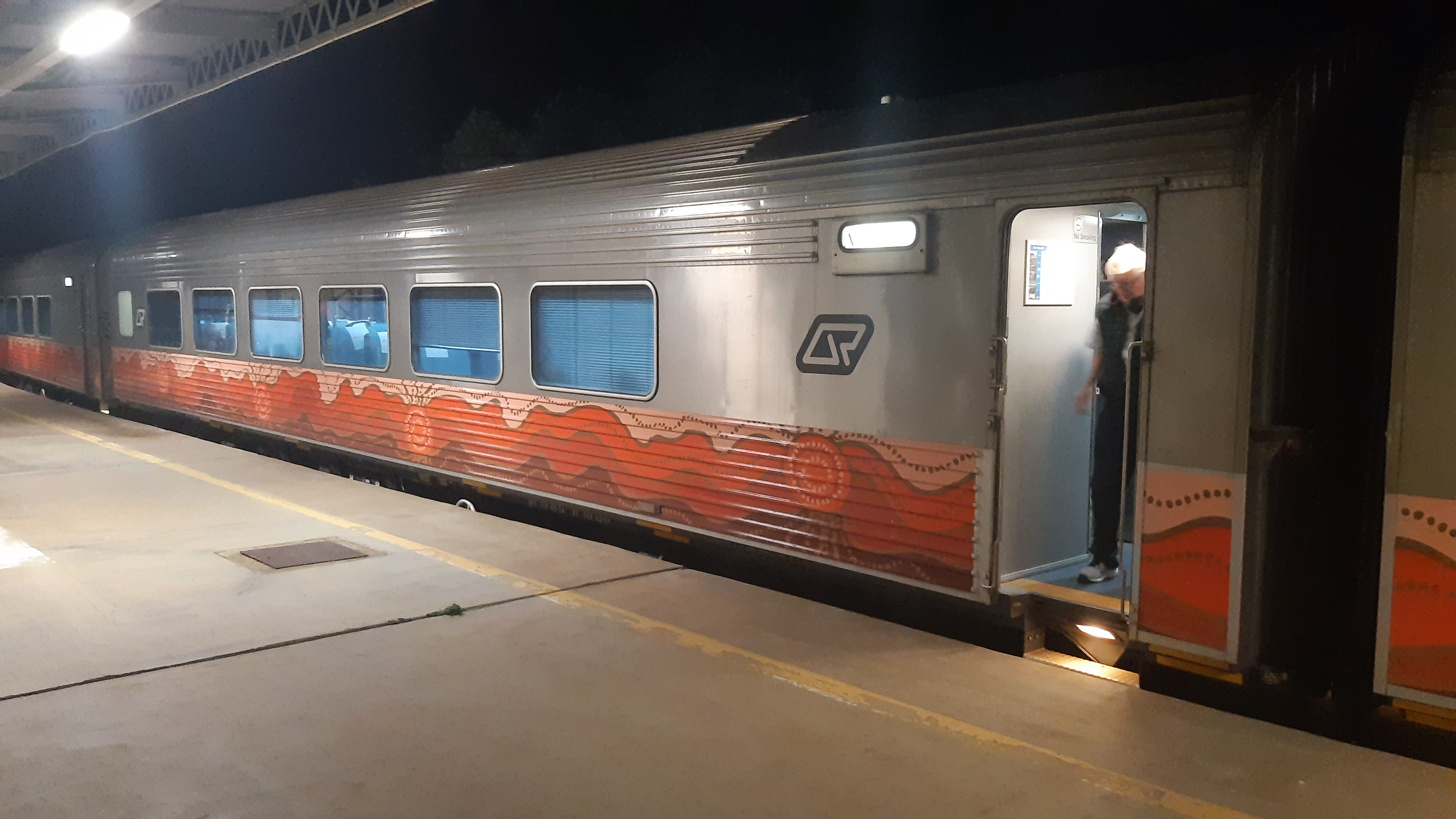
Passengers stretch their legs as the train pauses at Hughenden railway station

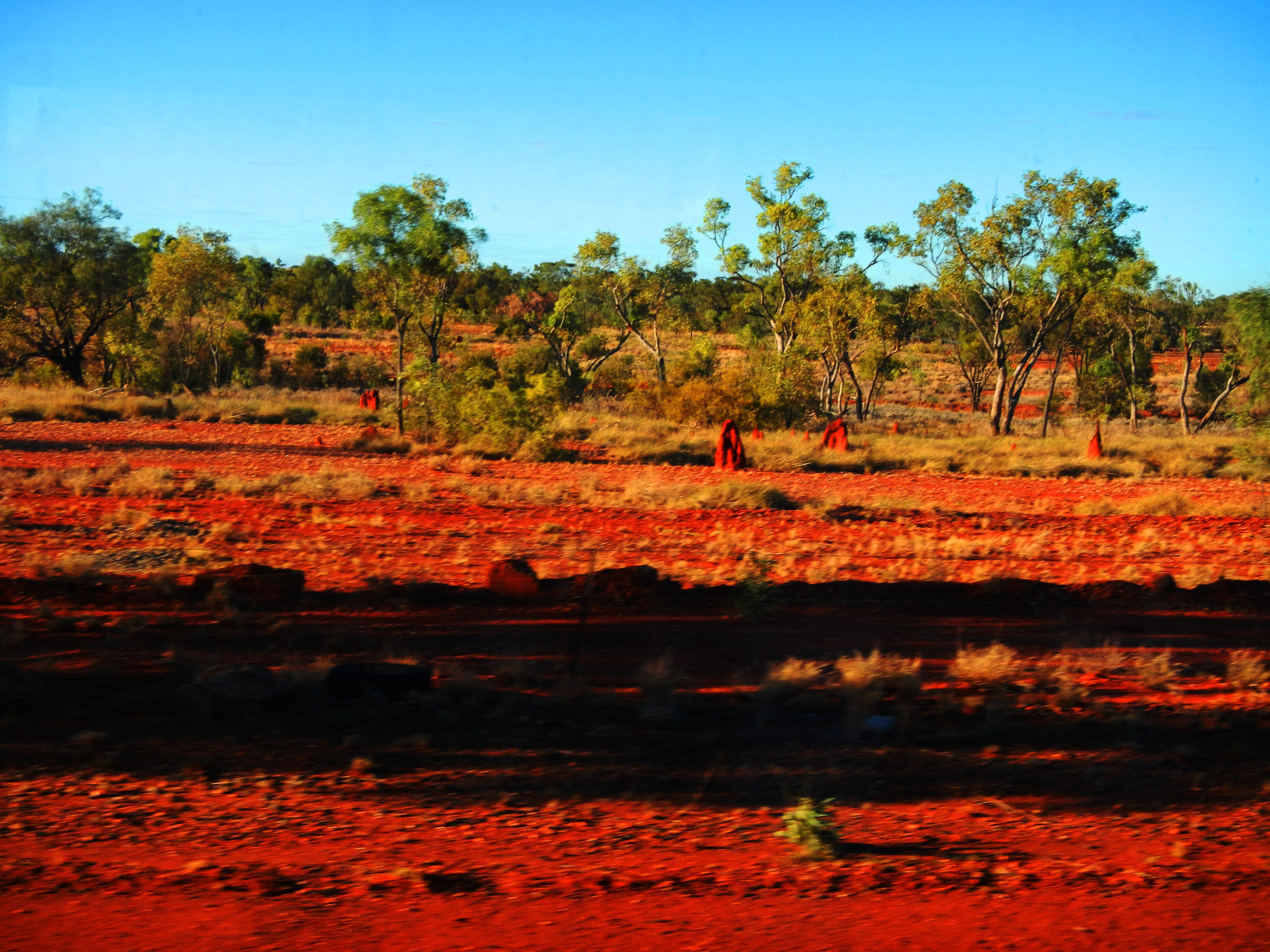
Outback scenery from the train
