= Home Hill railway station =

Railway station in Queensland, Australia

Home Hill
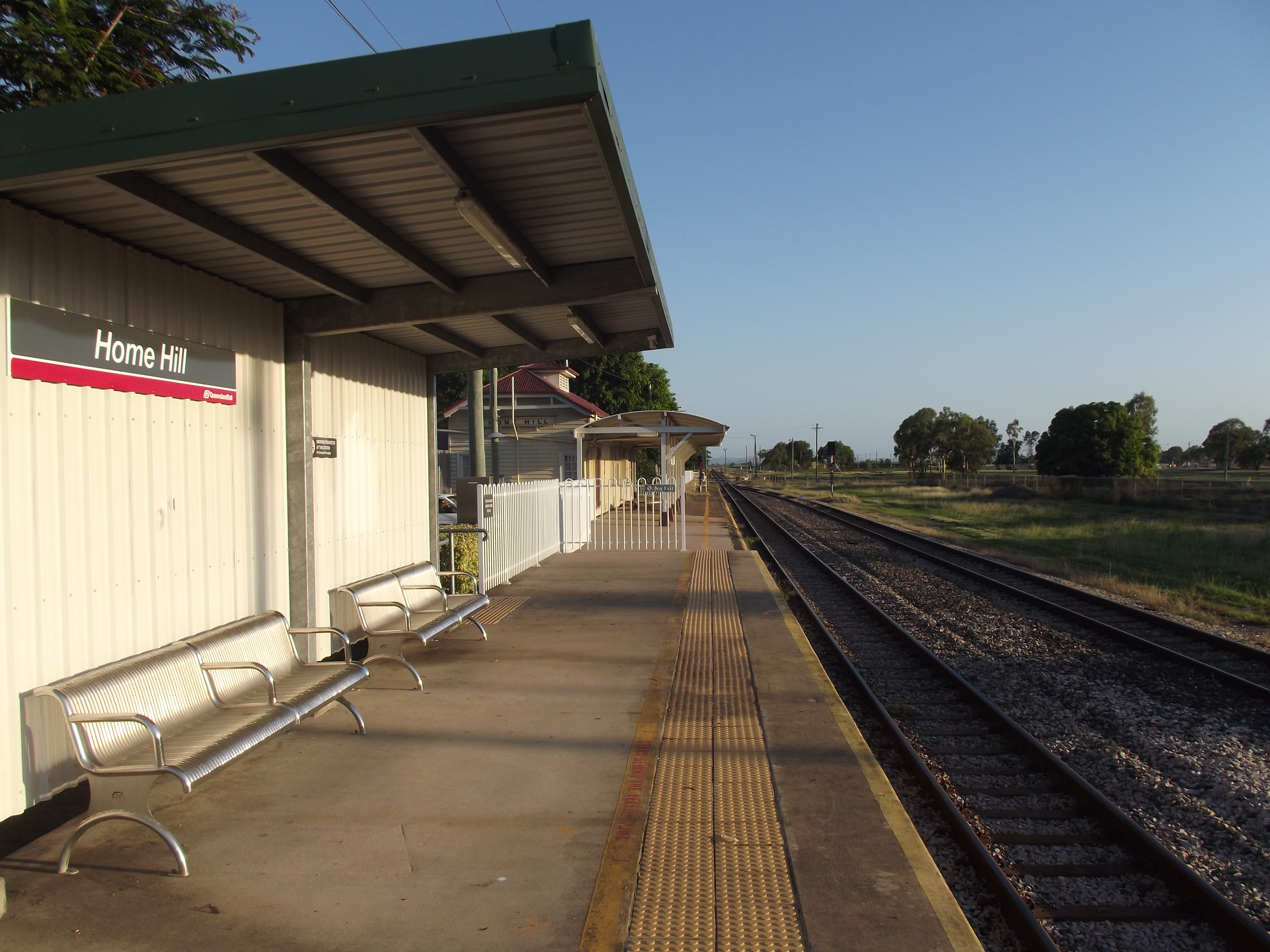
- Southbound view in January 2013

General information
- Location: Eighth Avenue, Home Hill
- Coordinates: 19.6656°S 147.4140°E
- Owner: Queensland Rail
- Operator: Traveltrain
- Line: North Coast
- Distance: 1248.78 kilometres from Central
- Platforms: 1
- Tracks: 2

Construction
- Structure type: Ground
- Accessible: Yes

Services
| Preceding station | Queensland Rail | Following station |
|---|---|---|
| Bowen towards Brisbane | Spirit of Queensland | Ayr towards Cairns |
Location

Home Hill railway station is on the North Coast line in Queensland, Australia, serving the town of Home Hill. It has one platform, with a passing loop across from it.

Home Hill and Ayr are the two closest stations, 11 kilometres apart.

== History ==
The North Coast railway line from Bobawaba to Townsville opened in 1913 and Home Hill railway station opened as part of it, for passengers and the sale of produce. By the 1970s, improvements to roads and the rising use of motor vehicles saw rail services in the region under threat of reduction or even closure. Rail motor service to Townsville ceased and in 1993 staff numbers at the Home Hill station were reduced. In 2003 the station and its goods shed was closed. However, the trains continue to stop at the station for passengers to board and disembark, under the supervision of the train crew rather than station staff.

== Services ==
Home Hill is served by Traveltrain's Spirit of Queensland service.
