= List of Queensland branch line locations =

This is a list of the location of sections concerning branch lines embedded in other articles. Branch lines with separate articles are listed in the box below in the 'Country branch lines' section.

== Branch line terminus stations ==
Aramac Tramway - Central Western railway line, Queensland#Branch lines

Ballara - Great Northern Railway (Mt Isa line)#Branch lines

Barakula - Western railway line, Queensland#Branch lines

Blair Athol - Central Western railway line, Queensland#Branch lines

Broadmount - North Coast railway line, Queensland#Branch lines

Brooloo - North Coast railway line, Queensland#Branch lines

Clermont - Central Western railway line, Queensland#Branch lines

Dajarra - Great Northern Railway (Mt Isa line)#Branch lines

Dayboro - Ferny Grove railway line

Ebenezer - Main Line railway, Queensland#Branch lines

Emu Park - North Coast railway line, Queensland#Branch lines

Greenvale - North Coast railway line, Queensland#Branch lines

Kilcoy - North Coast railway line, Queensland#Branch lines

Millaa Millaa - Tablelands railway line, Queensland#Millaa Millaa branch line

Mt Crosby - Main Line railway, Queensland#Branch lines

Mt Garnet - Tablelands railway line, Queensland#Private railways

Mt Molloy - Tablelands railway line, Queensland#Private railways

Mt Mulligan - Tablelands railway line, Queensland#Private railways

Phosphate Hill - Great Northern Railway (Mt Isa line)#Branch lines

Port Alma - North Coast railway line, Queensland#Branch lines

Ravenswood - Great Northern Railway (Mt Isa line)#Branch lines

Ridgelands - North Coast railway line, Queensland#Branch lines

Rumula - Tablelands railway line, Queensland#Private railways

Quilpie - Western railway line, Queensland#Branch lines

Springsure - Central Western railway line, Queensland#Branch lines

Tivoli - Main Line railway, Queensland#Branch lines

Trekalano - Great Northern Railway (Mt Isa line)#Branch lines

Yaraka - Central Western railway line, Queensland#Branch lines

Yeppoon - North Coast railway line, Queensland#Branch lines

== See also ==
- Rail transport in Queensland
