= Great Western Railway, Queensland =

Railway development proposal in western Queensland, Australia

The Great Western Railway was a railway development proposal involving a total of five new lines in western Queensland, Australia. Construction started in 1911 on sections of four of the lines, and three were opened in part before the project was effectively abandoned in 1920.

== History ==
Following the separation of Queensland from New South Wales in 1859, Queensland consisted of a vast area with a non-indigenous population of ~30,000, most of who lived in the south east corner of the colony. The Queensland Government was keen to facilitate development and immigration, and had approved the construction to the Main Line from Ipswich ~160 km to the fertile Darling Downs region in 1864. This was the first narrow gauge (1067mm or 3’6") main line in the world.

For the next 46 years the Queensland government continued to give priority to railway construction projects that were seen as facilitating development and settlement at the expense of system connectivity. At one stage there were 11 separate railway systems in Queensland, and whilst coastal shipping provided adequate service in the absence of a continuous North Coast line, there was no easy equivalent for the interior, where the virtual absence of navigable rivers meant that bullock wagons and horse-drawn coaches were the only transport options before a railway was constructed.

By 1910 the benefits of a connected system were seen as worth realising, and the North Coast Line Act was passed authorising a line from Rockhampton to Cairns, which when completed in 1924 provided a 1681 km line linking Brisbane to all major coastal towns and cities on Queensland's settled east coast.

On the same day the Queensland parliament also approved the Great Western Railway Act, authorising 2063 km of new lines in western Queensland. As John Kerr so succinctly put it, "…only 505 km was built, and only 468 km was opened...the project was designed to bring all country suitable for sheep grazing within economic distance, but it was ill conceived."

The Act required all sections to be constructed more or less simultaneously, giving an indication of the political considerations of the day, where competing regions were vocal when perceiving that another had been advantaged by a government decision. It is likely that aspect explains why both Acts were approved on the same day.

=== Proposal details ===
The actual Great Western Railway (GWR) line was to be from Tobermory to Camooweal, following an alignment proposed in the 1880s for a railway from Sydney to Darwin via Bourke.

This south-east to north-west alignment paralleled the Queensland coastline, having the benefit of providing roughly equidistant connections to the ports.

To connect the GWR line to the rest of the QR system, 4 connecting lines were proposed, described as Sections A to D. These were;

Section A – From Westgate on the Western Line to Eromanga

Section B – From Blackall to Windorah

Section C – From Winton to Springvale

Section D – From Malbon to an unnamed junction point. The Malbon – Duchess section is now part of the Mt Isa line.

== Construction progress ==
Section A – Construction started from a point 21 km south of Charleville, later called Westgate (as in Gateway to the west) in July 1911, and continued until 1917. The village of Quilpie (201 km from Westgate and 210 km from Charleville), on the west bank of the Bulloo River was established where construction halted, and became the terminus of the line.

The line went west rather than south west as the Commissioner for Railways, following an inspection of the route in 1911, determined a due west route would serve better country.

Section B – Construction started from Blackall, then the terminus of a branch line from the Central West line station of Jericho in August 1911, and continued until 1917, restarted in 1919 and being abandoned in December 1920, with the village of Yaraka (156 km from Blackall), becoming the terminus when construction ceased.

Section C – Construction started from Winton, then the terminus of a branch line from the Mt Isa line station of Hughenden in 1913, the start having been delayed whilst the best place to cross the Diamantina River was established. The line initially headed west towards Elderslie as, in the case of Section A, the Commissioner had determined that alignment served better country.

Rails laid for 37 km when construction was halted in February 1916 to focus on the construction of the Dobbyn line to provide copper ore for the war effort. Construction never restarted, and the line was never opened for traffic. The rails were salvaged as a job creation program in 1931.

Section D – Construction started from Malbon, then a station on the Selwyn line, in August 1911, and continued until 1920, with the hamlet of Dajarra (112 km from Malbon) becoming the terminus when construction was abandoned, although work had extended 16 km beyond there.

No construction work was undertaken for the GWR line itself.

== Legacy ==
Today the main legacy of the GWR proposal is the 58 km Malbon – Duchess section of the Mt Isa line, which has been upgraded to main line standard and also services the Phosphate Hill line.

The Dajarra branch was closed in 1993.

The Yaraka branch has been out of service since 2005, and the Westgate – Quilpie branch line has closed in the last few years due to parts of the line being washed away.

The idea of linking the western extremities of the QR lines was fulfilled when the Australian government contracted Qantas to provide air mail services linking Charleville, Blackall, Longreach, Winton and Cloncurry in 1922.

== See also ==
- Rail transport in Queensland
