= Spirit of Queensland =

Queensland Rail passenger service

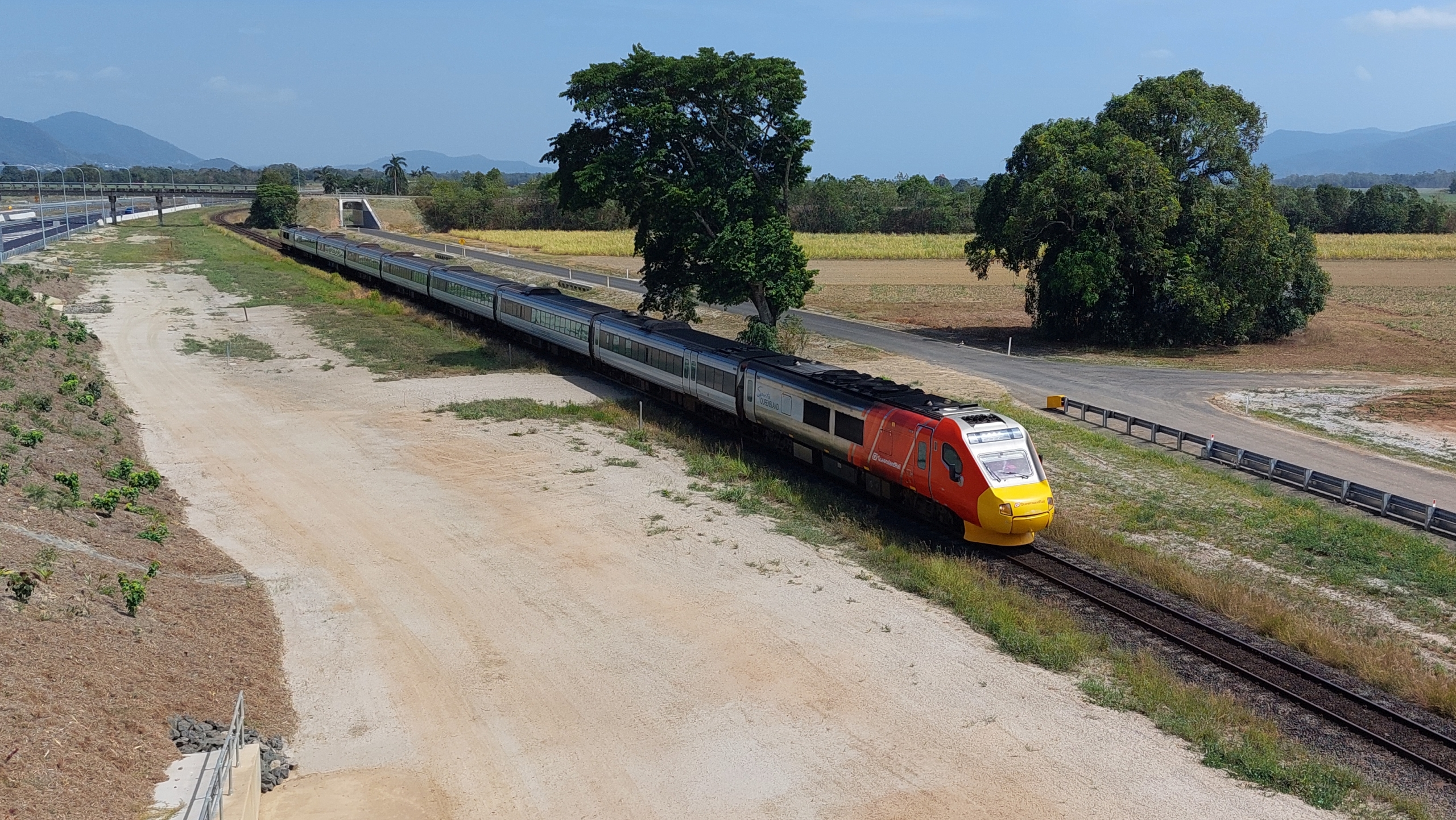
- Spirit of Queensland

Overview
- Service type: Passenger
- Status: Operating
- Locale: Queensland
- First service: 28 October 2013
- Current operator: Queensland Rail

Route
- Termini: Brisbane; Cairns
- Distance travelled: 1,681 kilometres (1,045 mi)
- Average journey time: 24 hours 55 minutes
- Service frequency: Five per week

On-board services
- Seating arrangements: Yes
- Sleeping arrangements: Yes

Technical
- Track gauge: 1,067 mm (3 ft 6 in)

The Spirit of Queensland is a long-distance passenger rail service in Queensland, Australia. Operated by Queensland Rail (under the Queensland Rail Travel brand), the service runs for 1,681 kilometres (1,045 miles) from Brisbane to Cairns.

== History ==
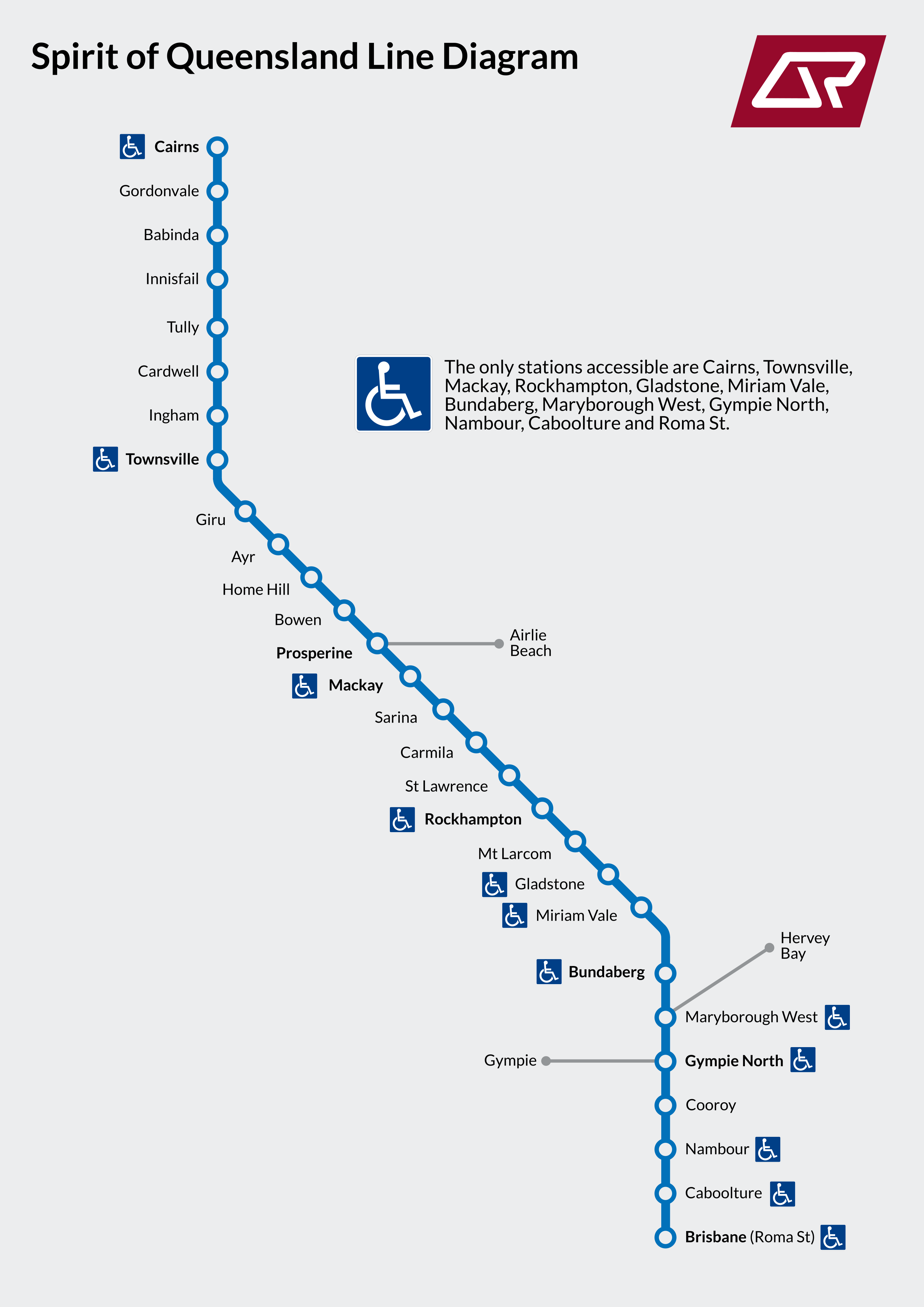
Route diagram of the Spirit of Queensland

In October 2010, the Queensland Government awarded a contract to Downer Rail for the construction of a new tilting train. The two existing diesel tilting trains used on the Cairns service were also refurbished and extended in size, with the inclusion of first-class sleeping carriages. Known as the 'Sunlander 14' project, a total of 25 carriages would have been acquired:

- two new power cars and 12 new carriages to create a third train set.
- one spare power car (later two),
- 10 new carriages to expand the two existing train sets to a 14-car consist,
- refurbishment of 14 existing carriages from the existing train sets

By expanding the train length from nine to 14 carriages, three 'luxury' sleeping carriages, one 'first-class' lounge and one restaurant car could be included in the consist, replicating the services provided on The Sunlander. The construction of four new power cars allowed for the inclusion of the most up-to-date safety features in the driving car of each train, as well as minimising the risk of disruptions in case an incident occurred while a second power car was undergoing heavy maintenance.

The resulting project was costed at $195 million and allowed for the operation of five services a week, with a total capacity of 1320 seats. However, costs had risen by 2012, and the Queensland Auditor-General reported that the eventual cost would be from $358 million to $404 million, because Queensland Rail had failed to take into account the requirement for upgraded maintenance facilities, as well as en route provisioning. The Auditor-General also believed Queensland Rail had overestimated how popular the new service would be, and had a mistaken belief that the 'luxury' component of the train would attract more high-paying customers.

In 2013, the project was scaled back. The train length was reduced to nine cars by removing the luxury sleepers and restaurant cars. This change resulted in a revised project cost of $204 million. In October of the same year, the first refurbished train was introduced on the Brisbane to Cairns service. With a maximum operating speed of 160 km/h (99 mph), the journey time was reduced to 24 hours 55 minutes.

== Rolling stock ==
Each Spirit of Queensland train consists of:

- two power cars to drive the train and supply power to the carriages,
- two 'railbed' sleeper cars with airline style lie-flat seating,
- three premium economy sitting cars,
- one luggage / staff carriage,
- one lounge / galley / club car.

== See also ==
- High-speed rail in Australia
