= Corella railway station =

Former railway station in Queensland, Australia

Corella

General information
- Location: Old Maryborough Road, Corella, Queensland
- Coordinates: 26°06′27″S 152°38′29″E
- Line: North Coast Line
- Connections: no connections

History
- Closed: Yes

Services
| Preceding station | Queensland Rail | Following station |
|---|---|---|
| Tamaree towards Brisbane | North Coast line | Curra towards Cairns |
Location

Corella railway station is a closed railway station on Queensland's North Coast railway line.
