= North Coast railway line, Queensland =

Railway line in Queensland, Australia

North Coast railway line
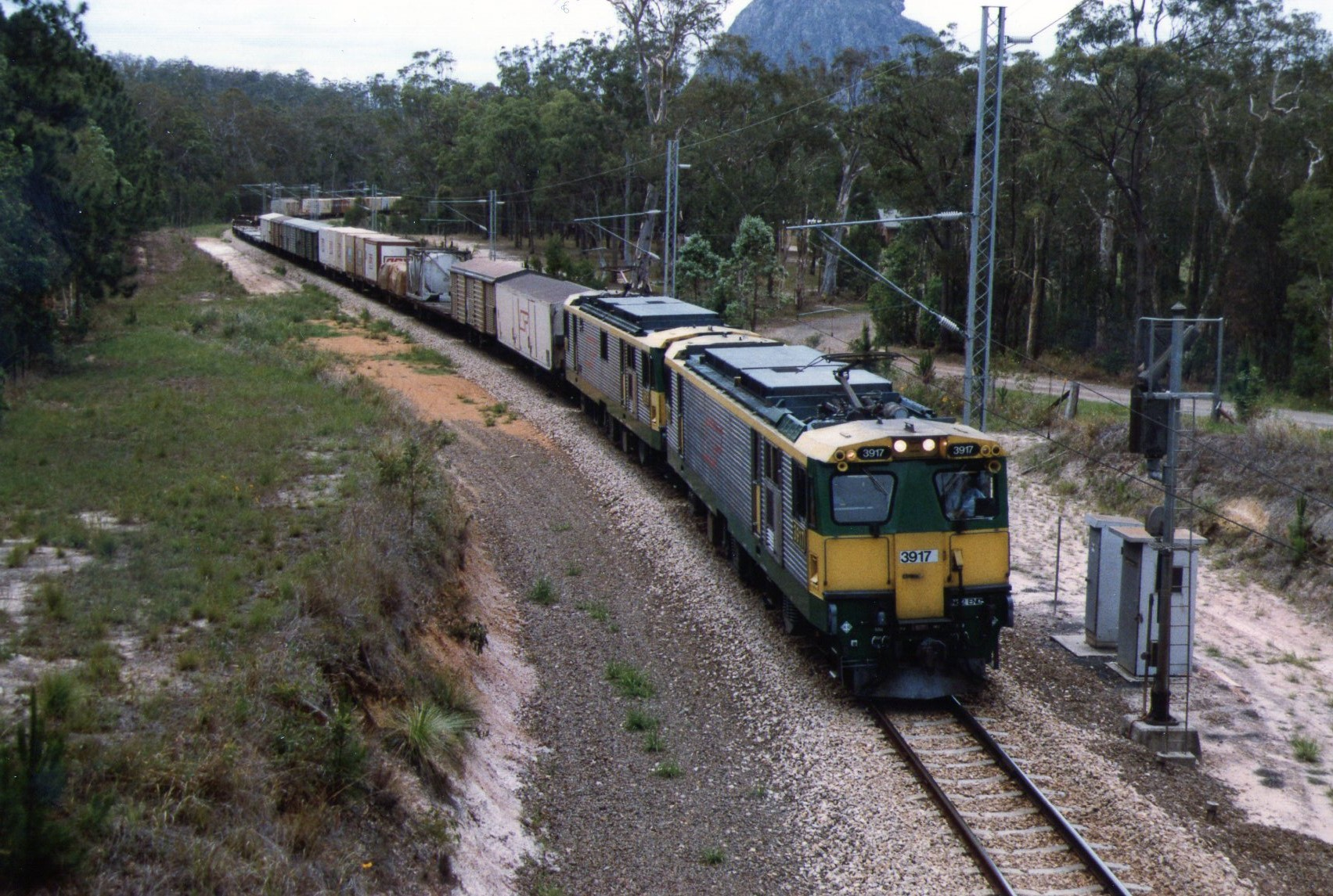

Technical
- Track gauge: 1,067 mm (3 ft 6 in)
- Train protection system: Brisbane to Northgate: AWS and ETCS-2; Northgate to Caboolture: AWS; Caboolture to Nambour: ATP and ATC; Nambour to Bundaberg: ATP and ATC; Bundaberg to Parana: ATP; Parana to Callemondah (City of Gladstone): Unknown; Callemondah to Rocklands: ETCS-2; Rocklands to Merinda: ATP except in Rockhampton; Merinda to Kaili: Unknown (managed by Aurizon); Kaili to Stuart: ATP; Stuart to Cairns: None (DTC)

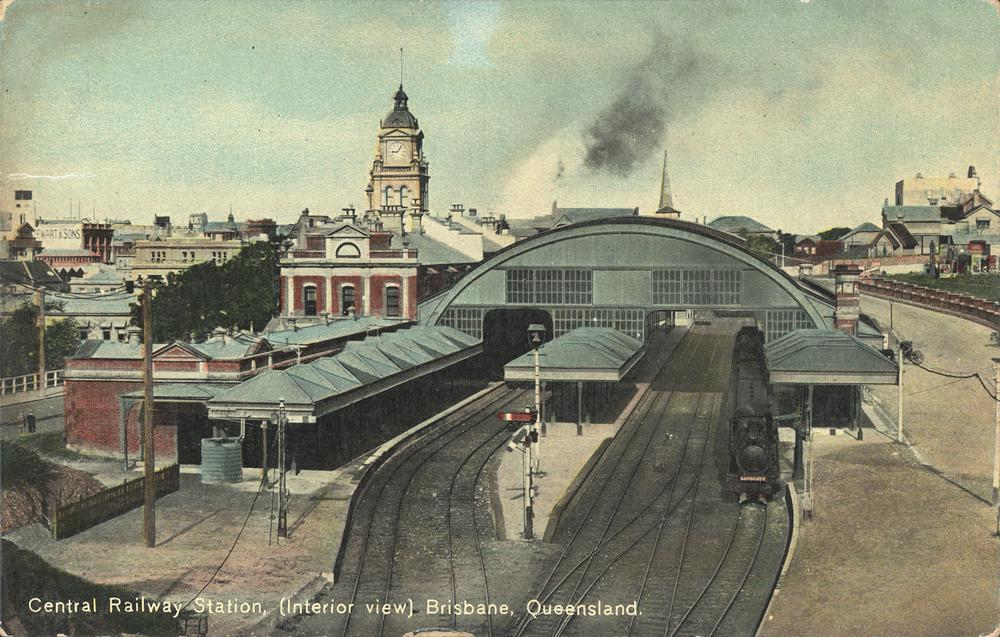
1911 view of Central station, Brisbane, designed by the former Colonial Architect, J J Clark

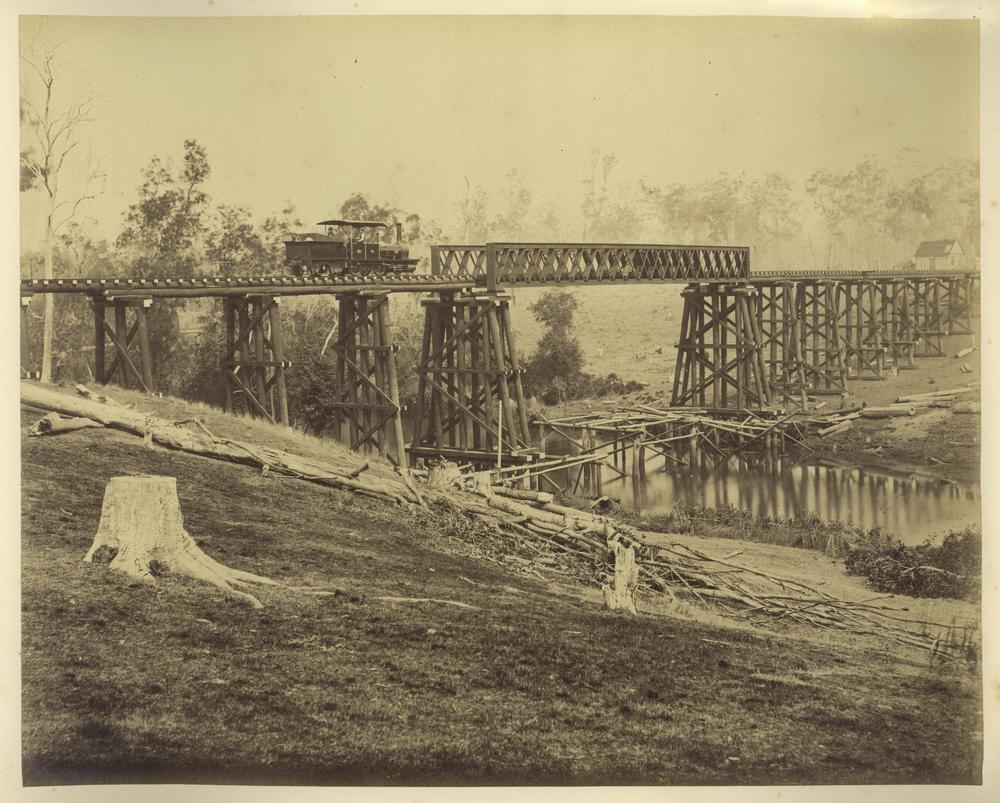
Locomotive on the recently constructed railway bridge over Grahams Creek (north of Mungar Junction), 1882

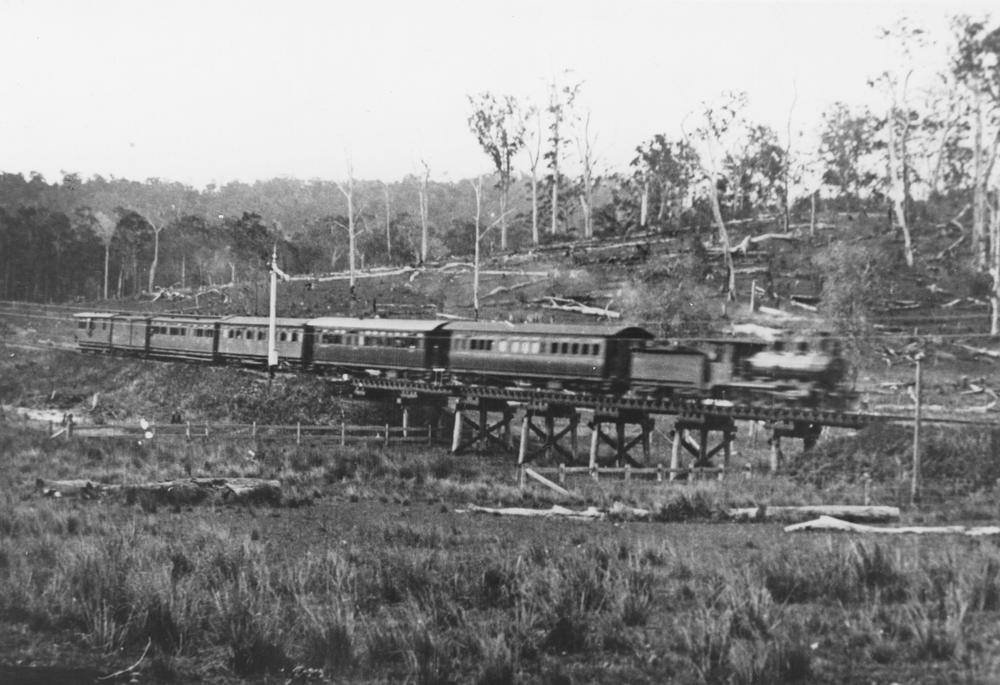
The half past two passenger train from Cooroy crossing the bridge just beyond the Butter Factory, Eumundi, 1915

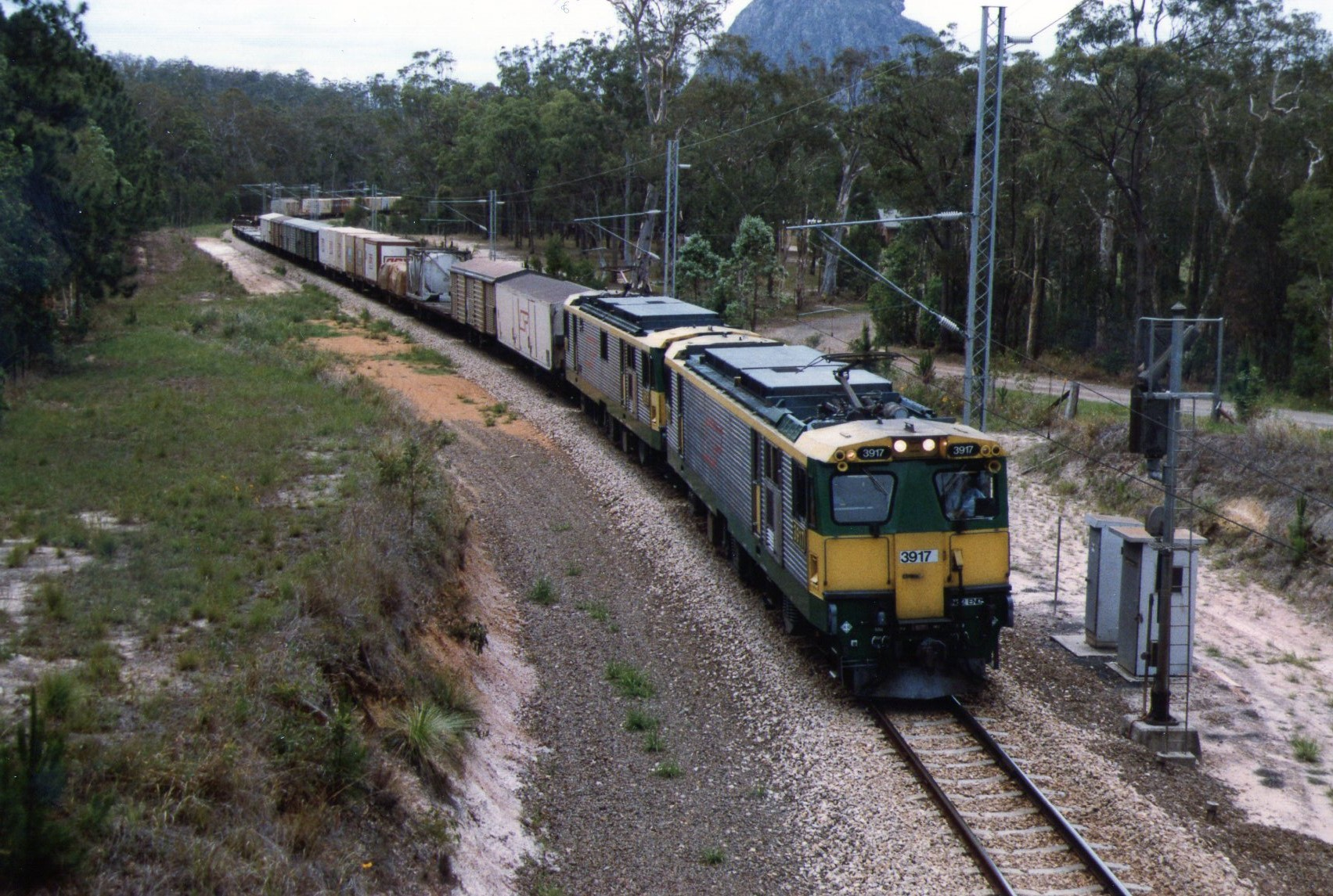
3917 and another haul a northbound goods train on the NCL with Mount Tibrogargan in the background

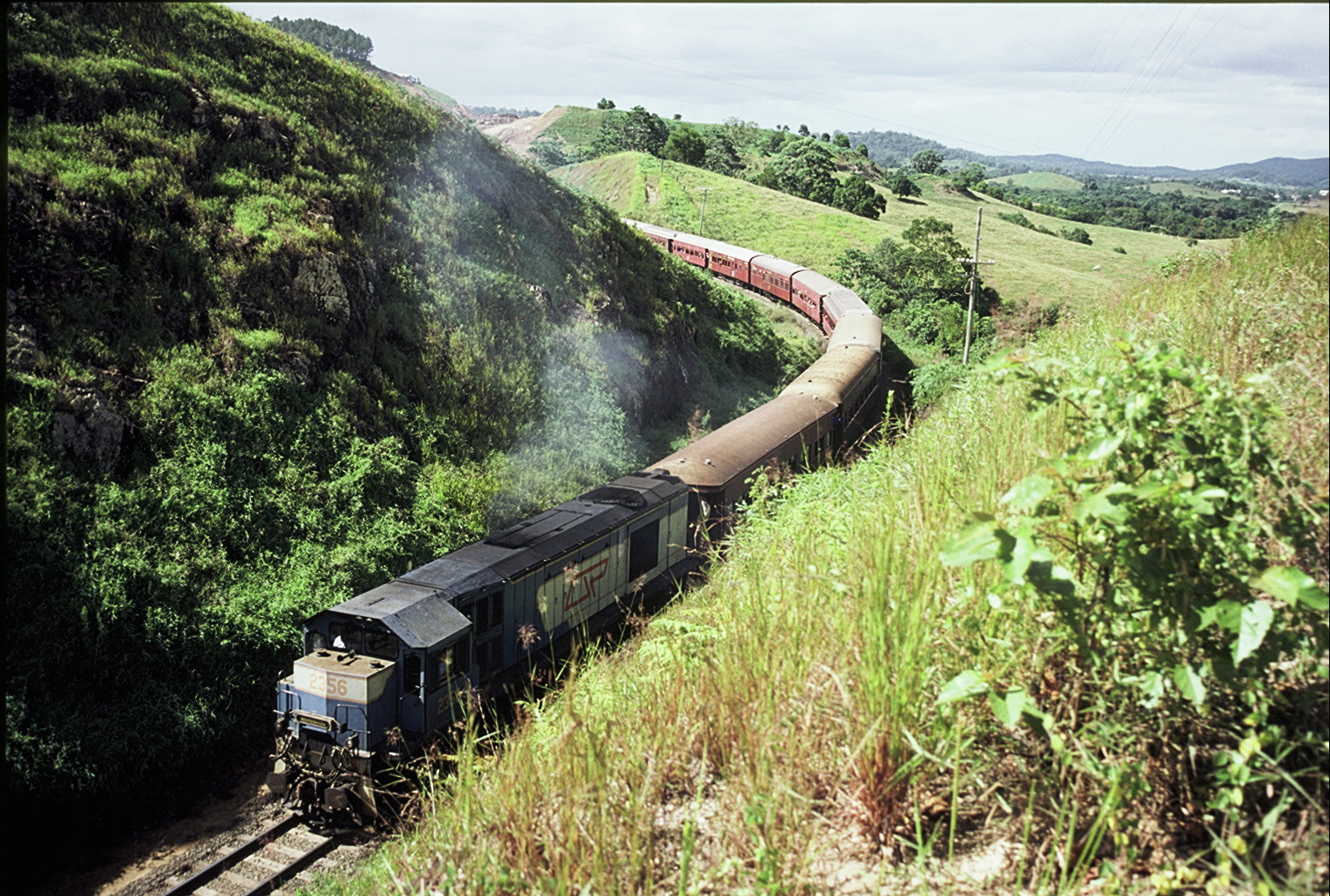
2356 hauls a special train up the grade north of Eumundi before the deviation was built, 1987

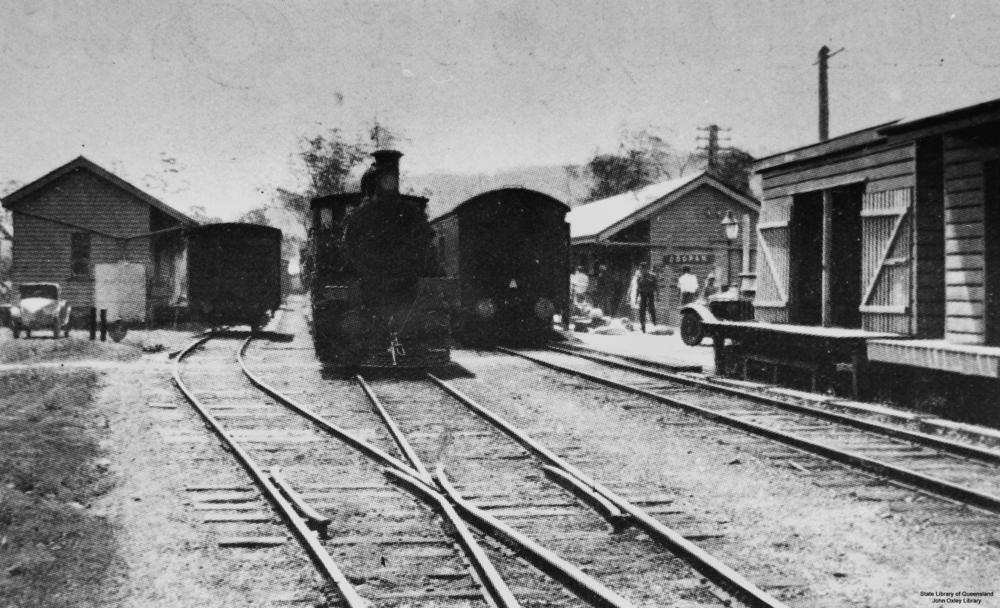
Cooran railway station, 1931

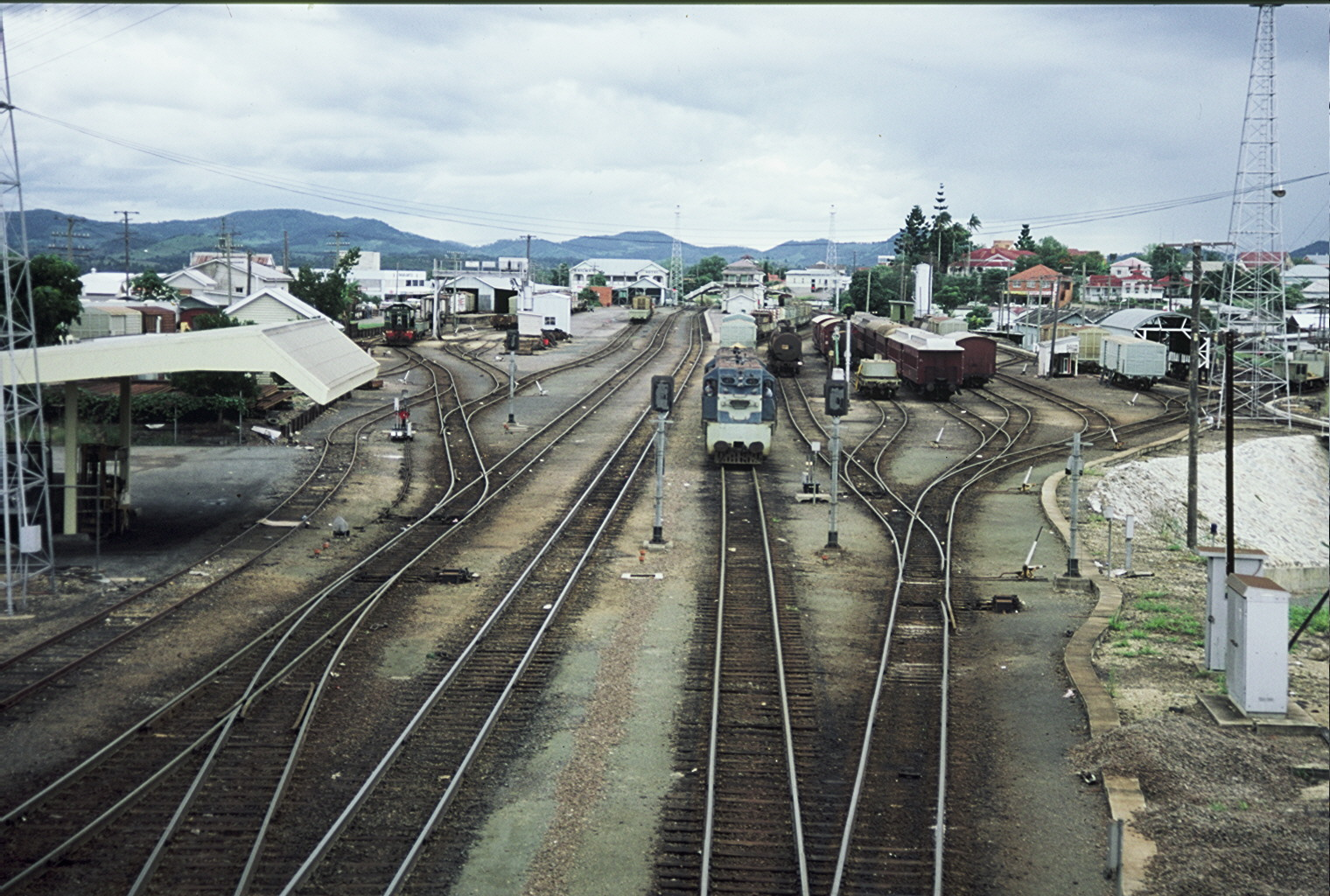
1451 & 1410 departing Gympie station hauling a northbound goods train, 1987

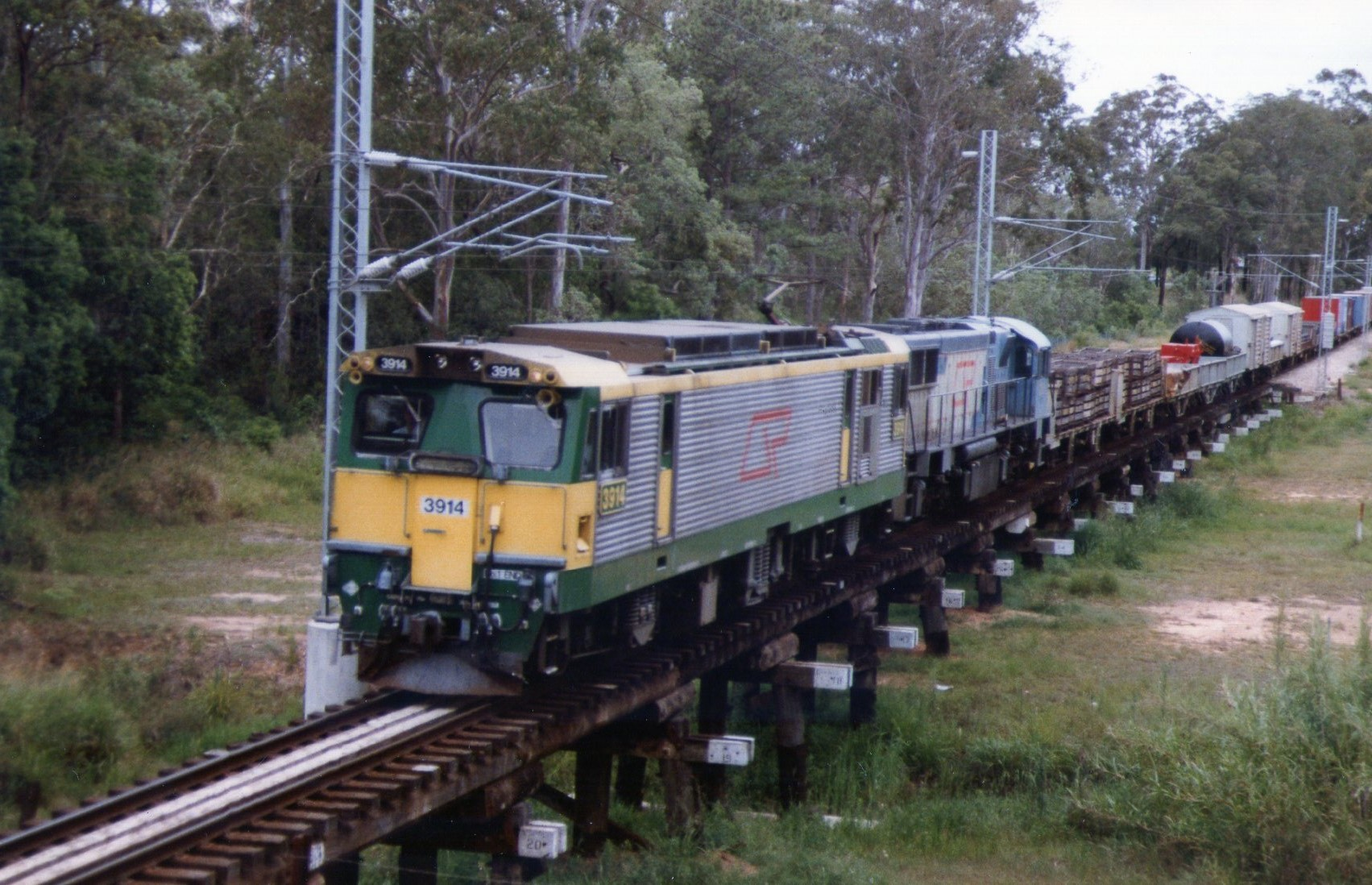
3914 hauls a goods train on the NCL north of Gympie, ~1990

Model of the SS Premier in the Gladstone maritime museum

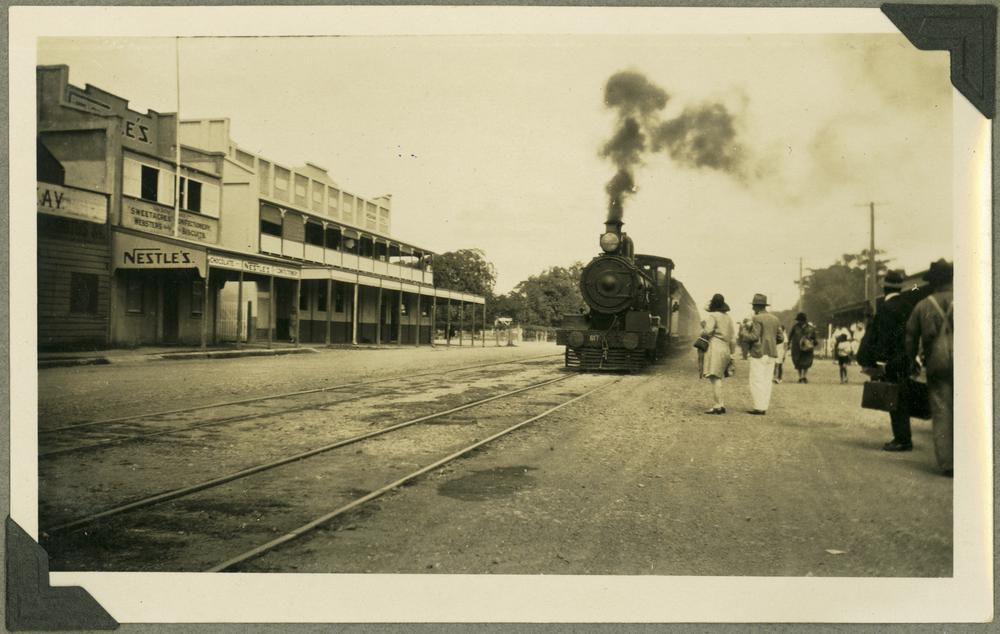
Passengers at the William Street railway station in Rockhampton with train leaving en route to Yeppoon ~1928

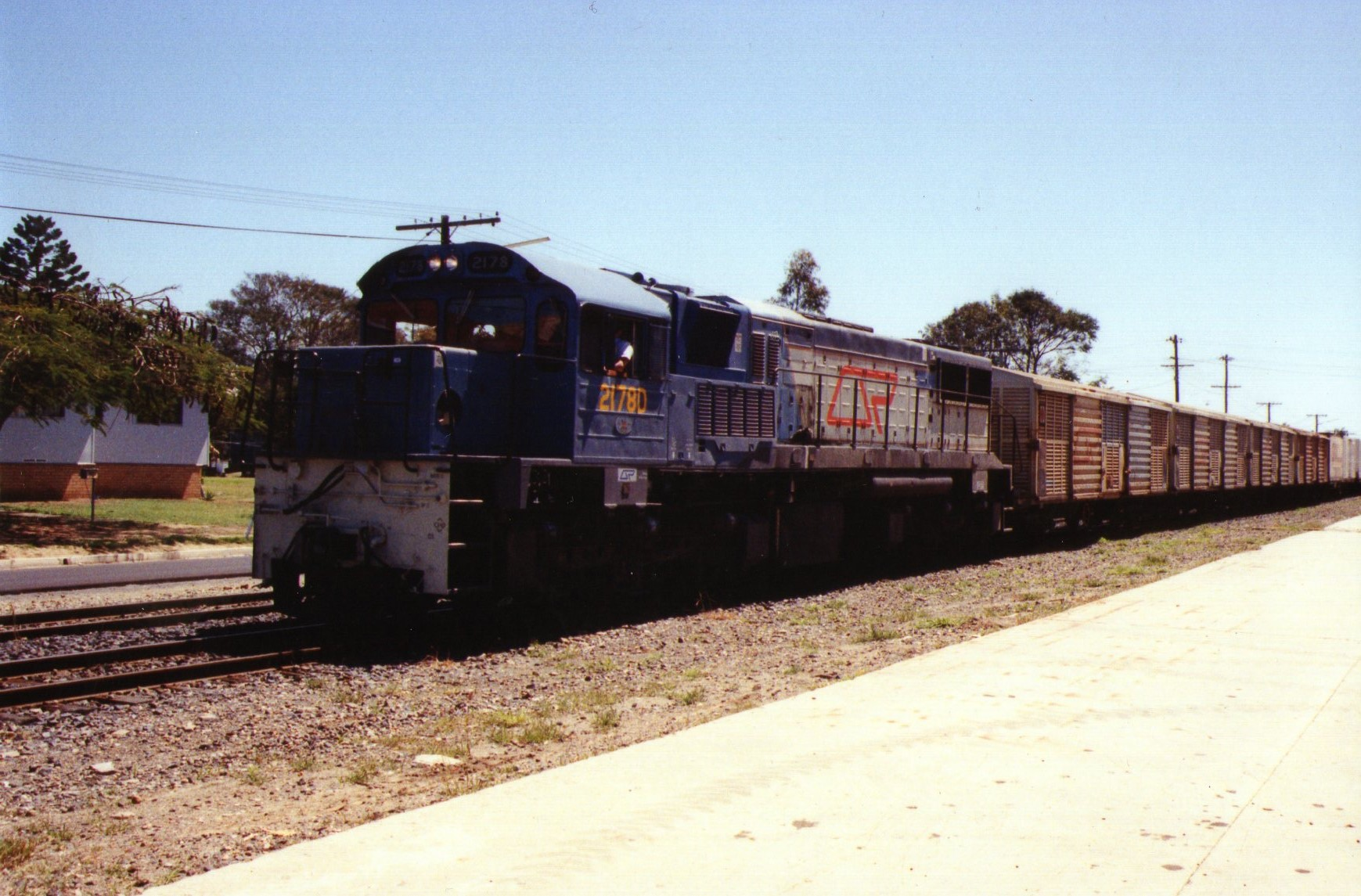
2178 hauls a southbound goods train on the Denison St section of the NCL in Rockhampton

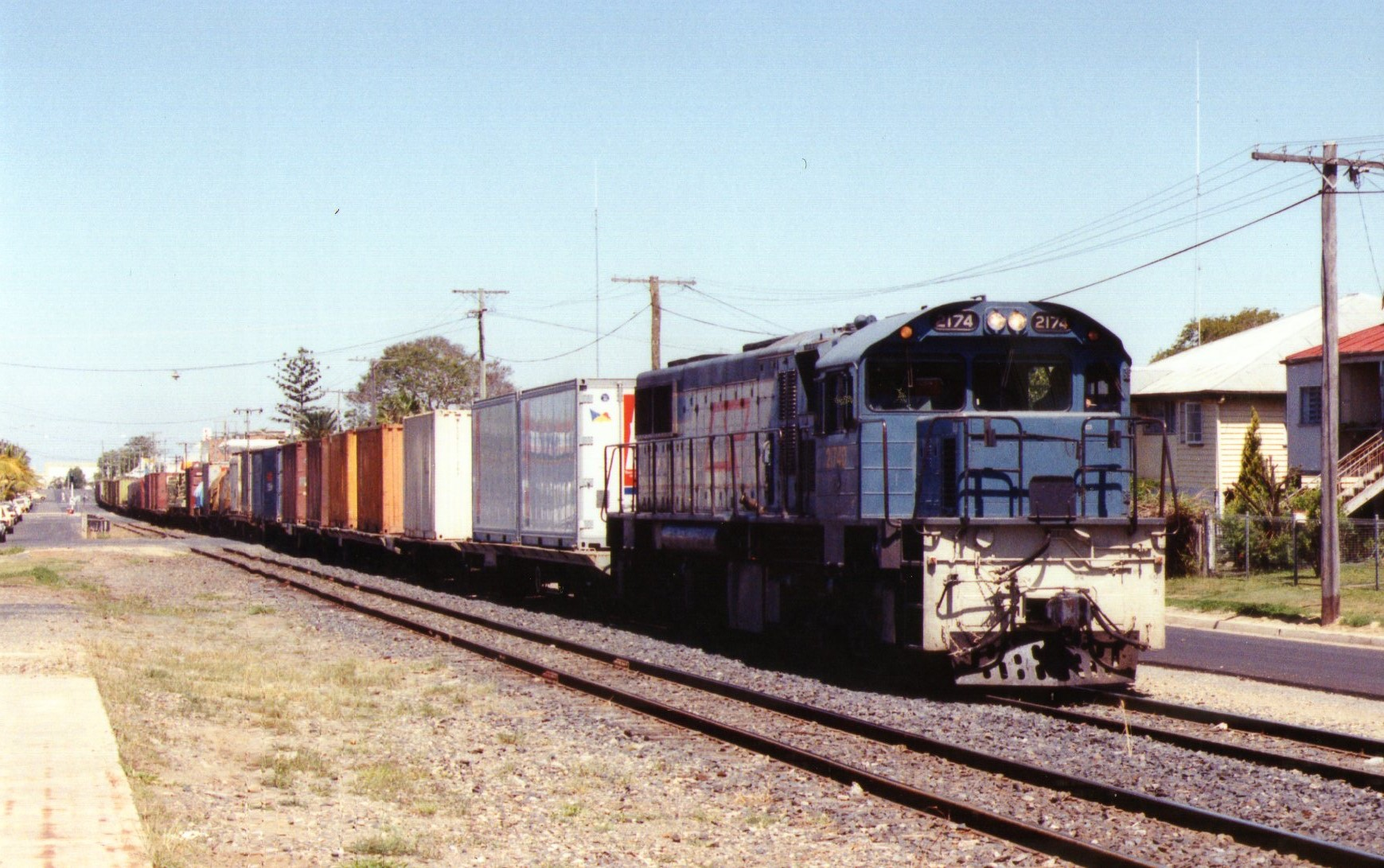
2174 hauls a northbound goods train on the Denison St section of the NCL in Rockhampton

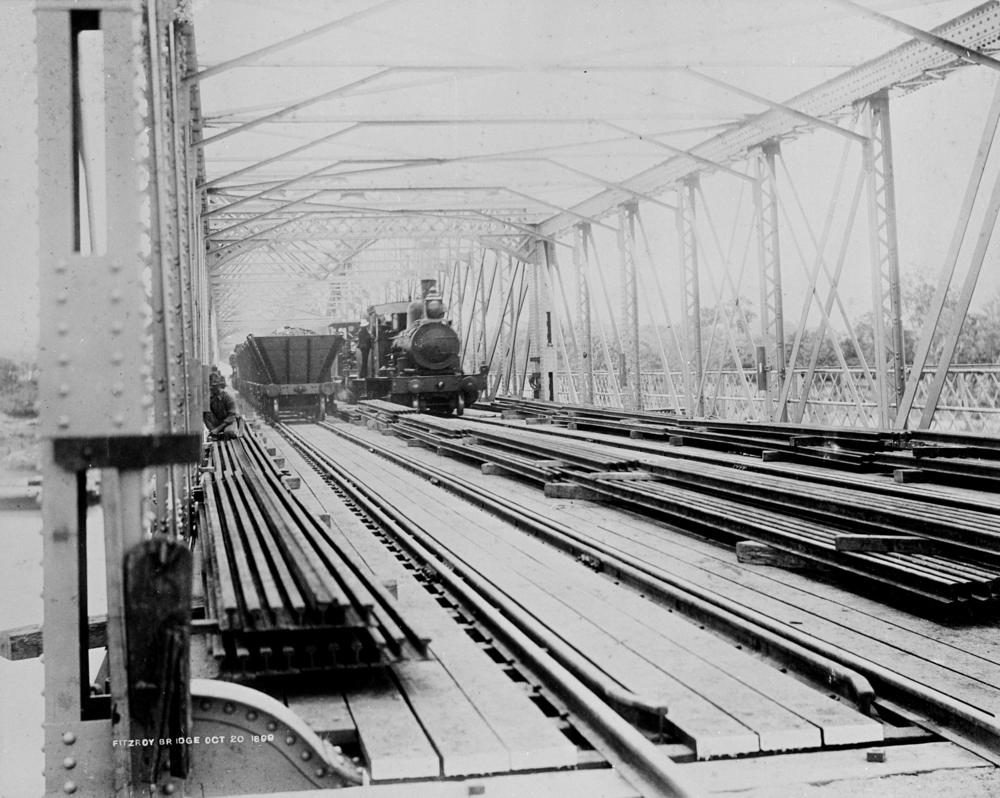
Construction train on the Alexandra Bridge, Rockhampton, 1899

The North Coast railway line (NCL) is a 1,681-kilometre (1,045 mi) 1067 mm gauge railway line in Queensland, Australia. It commences at Roma Street station, Brisbane, and largely parallels the Queensland coast to Cairns in Far North Queensland. The line is electrified between Brisbane and Rockhampton. Along the way, the 1,680-kilometre (1,040 mi) railway passes through the numerous towns and cities of eastern Queensland including Nambour, Bundaberg, Gladstone, Rockhampton, Mackay and Townsville. The line through the centre of Rockhampton runs down the middle of Denison Street.

== History ==
The first section of the North Coast Line was opened in 1881 and the final section in 1924, with over 60 sections opened during that period. It incorporates sections of lines built by local governments and subsequently taken over by the Queensland Railways, one isolated section was closed for two years following a financial crisis and another isolated section was initially built as a 610 mm (2 ft) gauge line.

Progress was hampered by several financial setbacks, debate over competing routes and parliamentary approval to connect Cairns to Rockhampton and Brisbane was not given until 1910.

Construction standards varied significantly depending upon the era and initial purpose of the section built. There have been five major and numerous minor deviations to improve the alignment of the original line, and three sections of it are duplicated.

=== First narrow gauge mainline ===
Queensland was the first jurisdiction in the world to adopt narrow gauge (1,067 mm or 3 ft 6 in) for its main lines, with the Main Line opening between Ipswich and Toowoomba between 1865 and 1867. By 1880 over 1,000 km of line had been opened, connecting Brisbane to Roma and Warwick and Rockhampton to Emerald, with a line from Townsville to Charters Towers under construction.

The pattern of early Queensland railway development was focused upon providing transport from inland areas to ports at the lowest possible cost. Coastal shipping provided adequate connections between the coastal communities and so priority given to building railways which would facilitate development and immigration to the interior of the colony.

=== Beginnings ===
The first section of what is now the NCL opened on 6 August 1881. It was built to connect the mining town of Gympie to a river port at Maryborough, and followed the Mary River valley. The Queensland Government was under constant pressure to reduce expenditure, and so despite the potential for the line to be part of a future main line, the line was constructed to pioneer standards with minimal earthworks, a sinuous alignment and 17.4 kg/m (35 lb/yd) lightweight rails. However, difficulties were encountered with some of the creek crossings with the crossing at Grahams Creek (25.5616°S 152.6091°E) requiring considerable ingenuity to construct. The line was officially opened in August 1881.

Further south a suburban railway was opened between Roma Street and Northgate (and Sandgate) on 11 May 1882, via Normanby. A direct line from Roma Street to Bowen Hills via Central station was opened in 1890, including a 770-metre tunnel, still the longest on the system.

The government formally decided to link Brisbane to Gladstone in 1883, but there was a demand for the southern connecting line to be from Esk to Kilkivan. Whilst that route may have served areas of fertile land, it was very hilly terrain, and the cost of earthworks would have been substantial. The coastal route would serve less promising agricultural land, but would be less expensive to build. As the Queensland parliament was dominated by rural members, both routes were surveyed in detail, taking six years due to the shortage of surveyors and the terrain involved. By the time the surveys were finished it was apparent the inland route would be prohibitively expensive, and the coastal route was approved.

The first section of line formally known as the NCL was opened from North Coast Junction (now Northgate) to Petrie and Caboolture in 1888.

=== Wide Bay extension ===
Coal had been discovered at Burrum, 25 km north of Maryborough, and a line was constructed to serve the mine, opening in 1883. The line was extended to Bundaberg in 1888 so coal could be shipped there as well.

=== 11 isolated railways ===
The opening of the isolated Bowen section of railway in 1890 (see below) had resulted in there being 11 separate railway systems operating in Queensland, including the Brisbane, Maryborough and North Bundaberg lines. This was reduced to nine once the Burnett Bridge and the linking of the Brisbane and Maryborough systems occurred, and the number of isolated systems gradually reduced as the NCL progressed, though two lines were never connected to the remainder of the system.

=== First connection ===
The coastal route was approved in 1889, with construction starting from both Caboolture and Gympie, and the linking section opened in 1891. It was built to main line standard with 29.8 kg/m (60 lb/yd) rail, 8 chains (160.9 m) minimum radius curves and 1 in 50 (2%) maximum grades, equivalent to 1 in 48 (~2.1%) on a minimum radius curve. This section features the only two tunnels on the entire NCL, one being 191 m, the other 160 m.

An example of the benefits of a connected system was the decision by the CSR sugar company in 1895 to rail sugar from Childers to Brisbane instead of using coastal shipping from Maryborough.

=== To Port Curtis ===
Parliament approved the Bundaberg to Gladstone line whilst the Brisbane-Gympie competing survey work was still underway, and contracts were let in 1888. A railway had opened from North Bundaberg to Mount Perry in 1884, that line starting from the opposite side of the Burnett River from the main part of Bundaberg in order to save the cost of constructing a bridge. The 534-metre bridge over the river connecting the two lines opened in 1891. Construction continued north, and the next section to Rosedale opened in 1892.

The largest bank in Queensland collapsed following the 1893 Brisbane flood, and the subsequent financial downturn resulted in a 2-year halt in construction. The line to Gladstone finally opened in 1897.

=== Temporary resistance ===
Gladstone has the best port in central Queensland, and except for the Canoona gold rush near Rockhampton it may have become the main regional city. Rockhampton business interests were very successful in resisting the construction of a railway south of their city in order to prevent freight from the Central West line travelling to Gladstone and its deep water port, and continued to resist that proposal even after the Brisbane – Gladstone link was opened.

Therefore, in 1898 the government established an overnight steamer service between Gladstone and Rockhampton, initially with the 'Miner'. The Gladstone Boat Mail departed Brisbane at 9 pm three days per week, arriving at Gladstone at 12:20 pm the following day, where the steamer would be waiting, but not depart until the tide was suitable. This gave a minimum journey time of 22 hours between Brisbane and Rockhampton, but if the train arrived just after a suitable tide, the transit time could be up to 11 hours longer. The steamer docked at Broadmount jetty and passengers transferred to the awaiting train. Until the 244-metre Alexandra Bridge opened in November 1899 (including the 1.85-kilometre (1.15 mi) section of line travelling along the middle of Deniston Street), the train terminated at North Rockhampton.

A steamer service from Gladstone to Mackay and Townsville was also introduced, with the weekly Boat Mail running onto the Gladstone wharf right beside the ship from 1908, and operated until the NCL connection to Townsville was opened in 1923.

In an attempt to reduce the tidal influence on the voyage timing, the government purchased a stern paddle wheel steamer called the 'SS Premier' in 1899, but that didn't solve the problem. It is an indication of the strength of resistance to a southern rail connection from Rockhampton that this vessel was purchased. An indication of how quickly the advantages of a rail connection over coastal shipping then diluted that resistance can be seen by the approval of the Gladstone - Rockhampton line just one year later, the entire 101 km line opening in 1903.

== Events further north ==
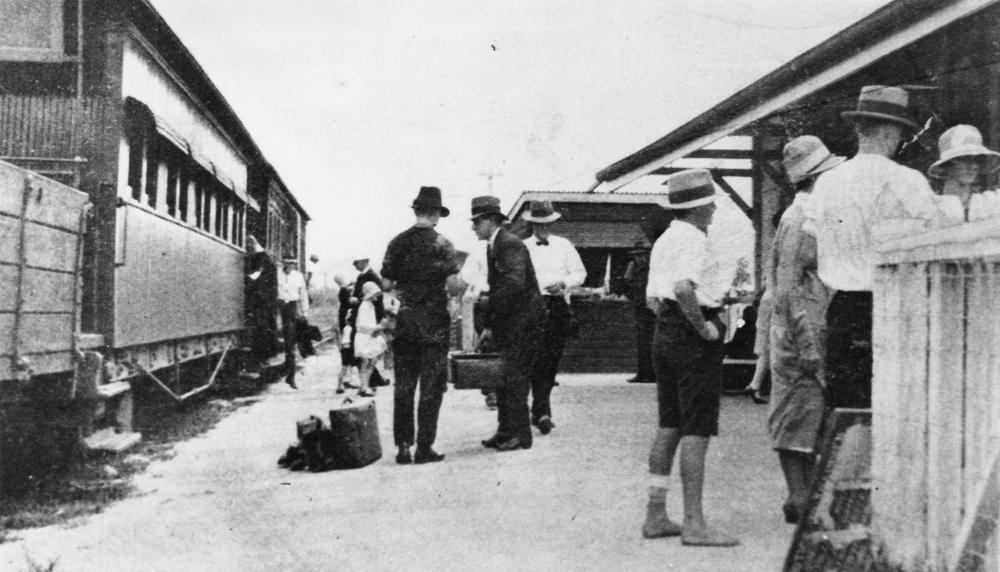
Tully station, 1930

Bowen was the first settlement in north Queensland, and had the best harbour in the region. Once again gold resulted in a less desirable port being utilised when the Northern line to Charters Towers was constructed from Townsville. To make political amends, a line was opened from Bowen 39 km towards the Northern line, and extended another 30 km in 1891. Construction then halted due to debate over the junction point, Bowen business interests wanting it as close to the goldfields as possible whilst Townsville wanted a coastal route that would serve good sugar cane growing areas, north Queensland's main agricultural crop. The 1893 financial crisis stymied further progress, and as the Bowen line's main customer was an abattoir, there was little interest in further expenditure on the government's behalf.

=== Tramways ===
As a result, the local governments in the Townsville and Ayr districts formed the Ayr Tramway Joint Board (ATJB) to construct a 69 km line south to the cane lands.

The Railway Guarantee Act 1895, which required local governments to guarantee any losses incurred by railways they had requested the State government to build, resulted in some regional communities believing they were paying for railways built to a standard more costly than necessary.

Local governments could utilise the provisions of the Tramway Act 1880 to build local railways more cheaply. Whilst the gauge matched QR's lines, in other respects the tramways were more akin to the pioneer lines built 30 years earlier, with low maximum axle load, minimum earthworks and in some cases an alignment sharing a road corridor.

The ATJB secured loan funds from the State, and the line opened in 1901. Under the same provisions, Cairns Shire Council built a 23 km line south to Gordonvale in 1897, and extended it 37 km to Babinda in 1910.

=== Bowen's blues ===
A further financial crisis following the Federation drought in 1903 resulted in the line being closed and leased to the local abattoir for two years, until the government resumed public operations when improved finances allowed.

The residents of Proserpine, 61 km south of Bowen, unsuccessfully lobbied for a rail connection and so the local governments followed the ATJB model and constituted the Bowen Proserpine Joint Tramway Board and opened a line in 1910.

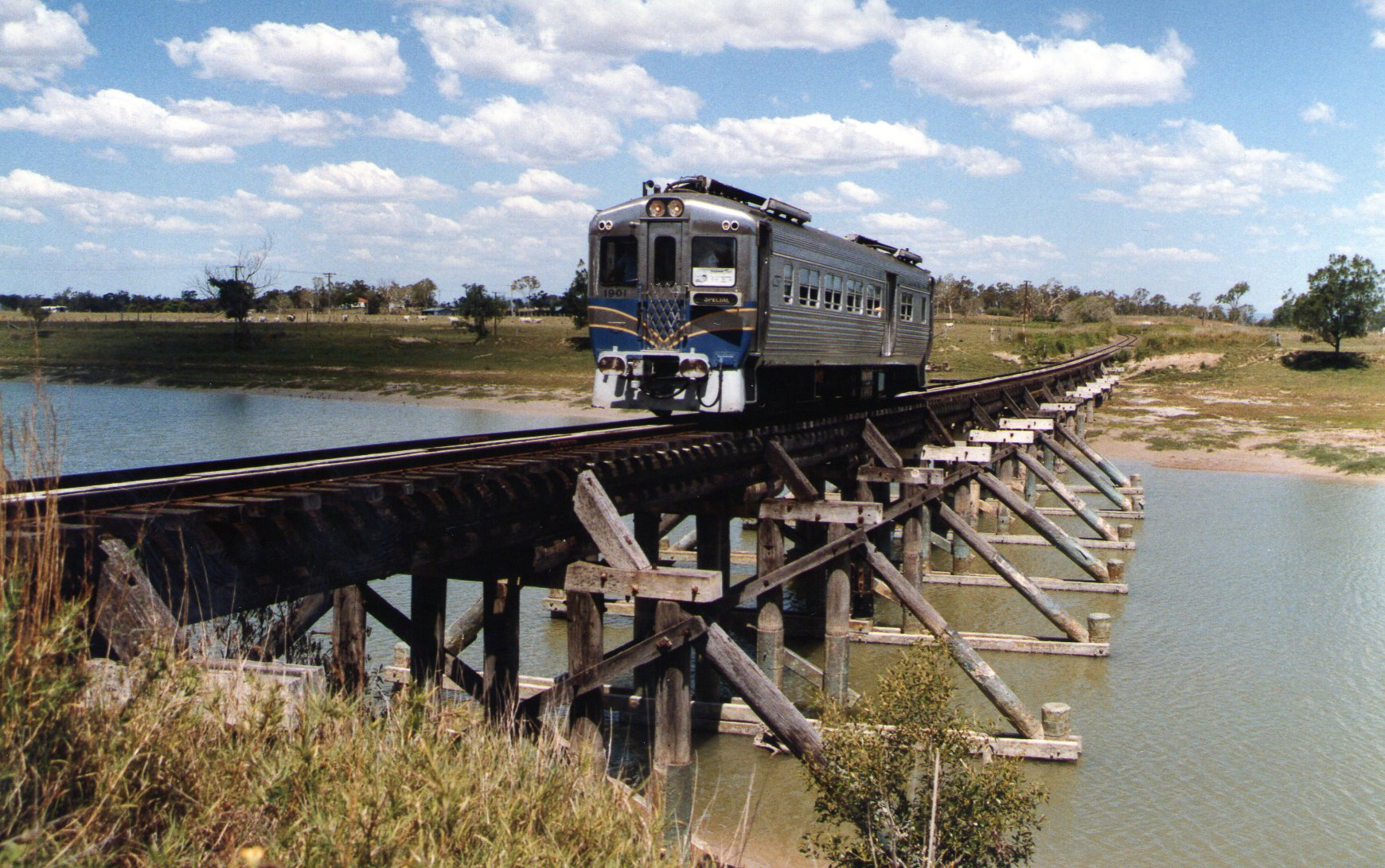
RM 1901 crosses the Styx River on the original bridge, ~1991. This bridge has since been replaced with a high level concrete structure

== North Coast Railway Act ==
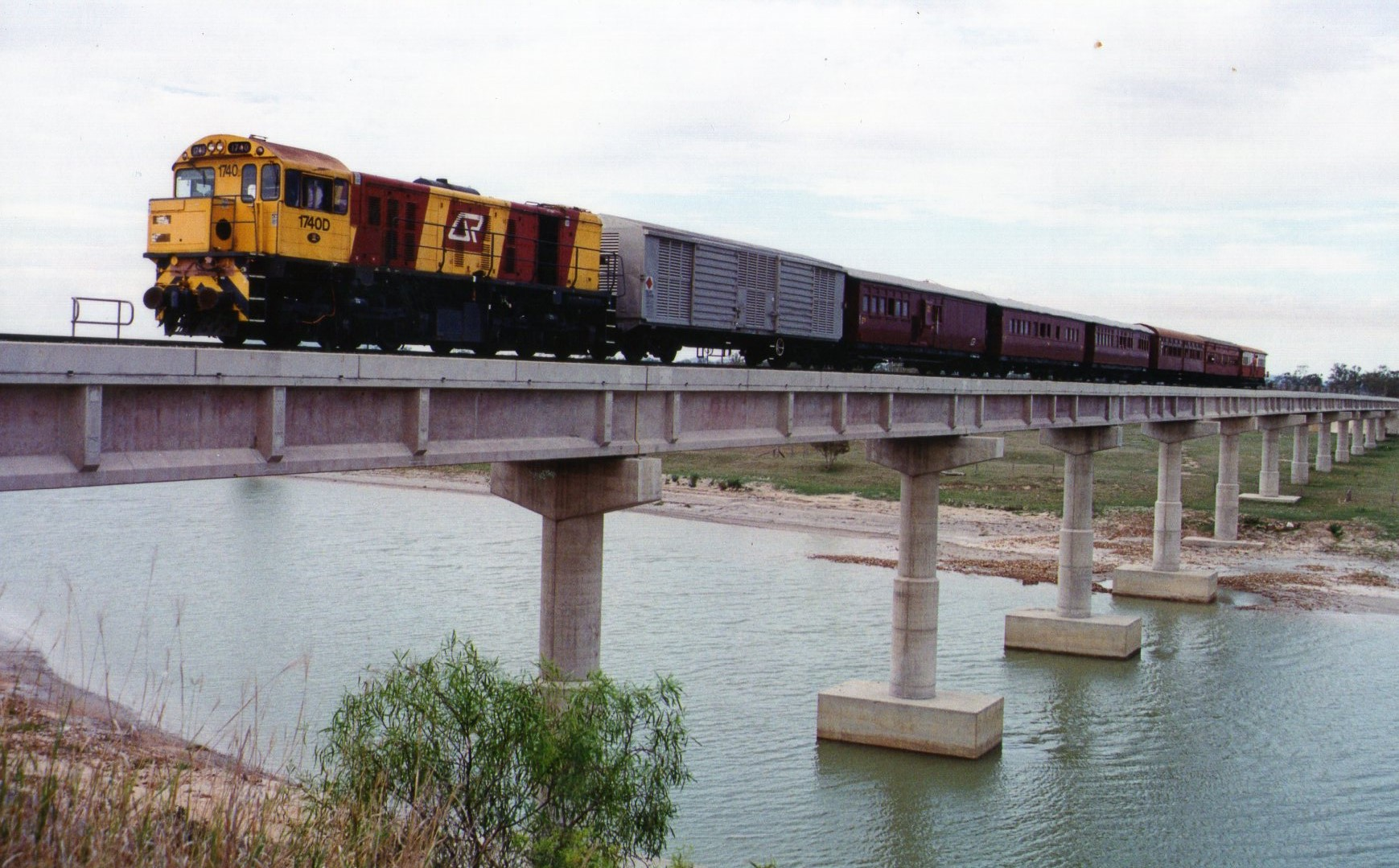
1740 hauls a special train over the new Styx River bridge, ~1993

The passing of the North Coast Railway Act 1910 finally committed the government to linking Cairns, Townsville and Mackay to Rockhampton and Brisbane. It authorised Queensland Railways to construct 731 km of new line and purchase the 192 km of tramways that would become part of the route.

As in the case of the GWR Act passed on the same day, regional rivalries required construction to commence as simultaneously as possible, spreading resources and slowing down overall progress. Priority was subsequently given to sections that would serve cane country, as despite situations such as the Childers-Brisbane sugar traffic, long-distance freight traffic was not expected to grow once lines were connected. The NCL was seen as mainly benefiting passengers, especially as bad weather could frequently disrupt coastal shipping during the cyclone season.

The main works were bridges over the numerous, and often wide coastal river systems, and a 12-long ton axle load was established for all new construction, requiring the tramways to be raised to the same standard.

Construction was divided into five regions, described as sections A–E, being:

- Section A – Rockhampton to St Lawrence
- Section B – St Lawrence to Mackay
- Section C – Mackay to Proserpine, Bobawaba (end of the Bowen line) to the Burdekin River and upgrading the Proserpine tramway.
- Section D – Burdekin River to Ayr, Townsville to Cardwell and upgrading the Ayr tramway
- Section E – Cardwell to Babinda and upgrading the tramway to Cairns

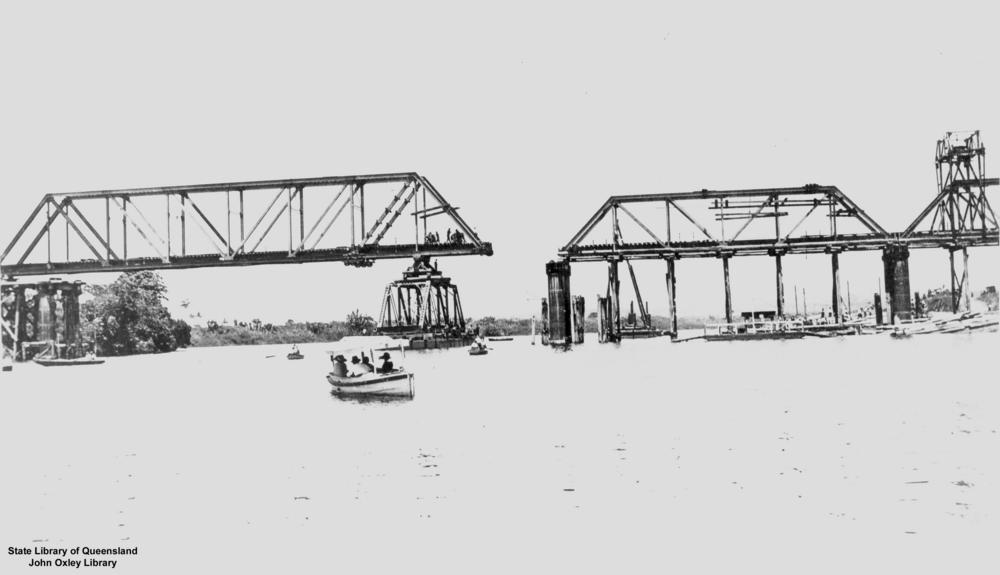
Daradgee Bridge, spanning the North Johnstone River, four miles (6.4 km) north of Innisfail. The last span of the north coast line bridge is being put into place. The main 200 ft (61 m) span of this bridge was floated into position from the Innisfail side on 31 October 1924 and was finally lowered on its bearings on 4 November 1924. The work was completed on 25 November 1924.

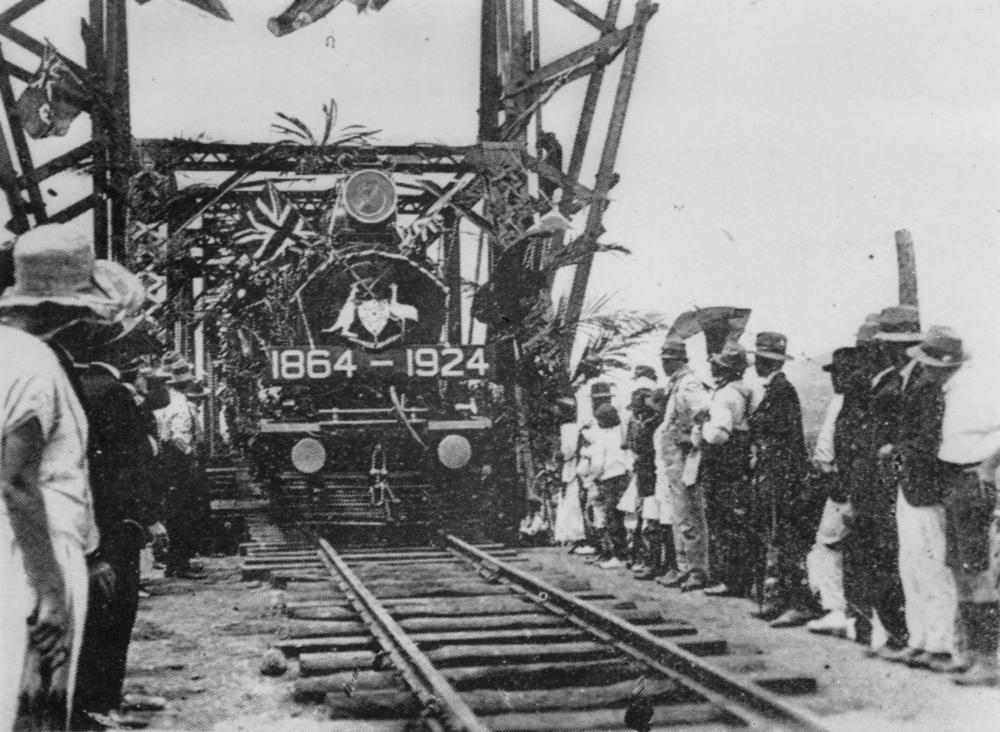
First train over the Daradgee bridge

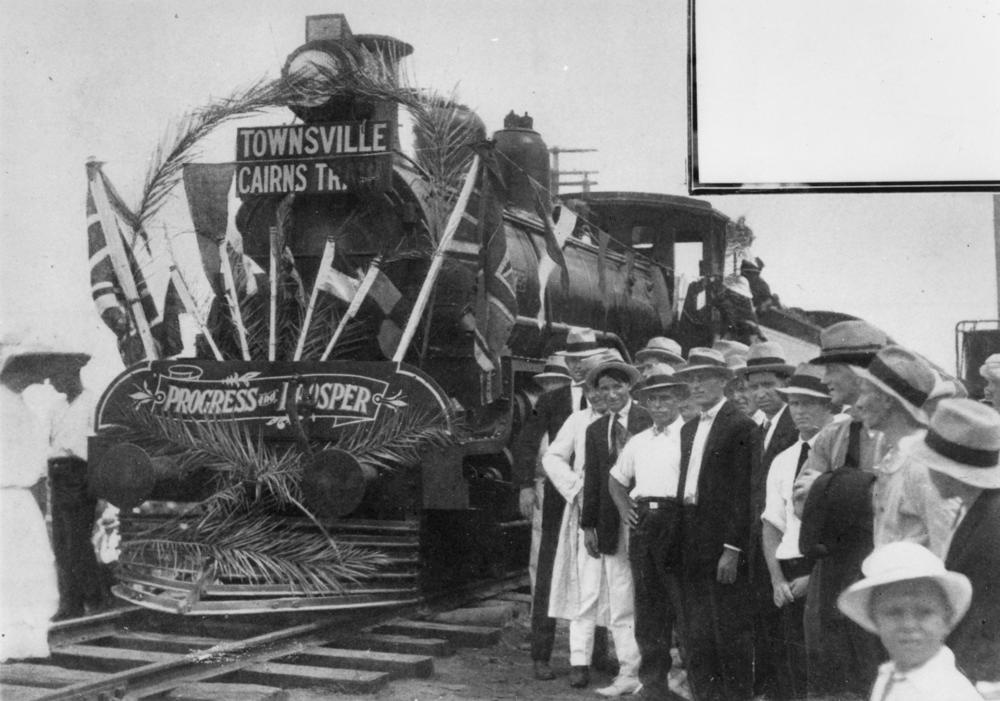
Train from Townsville crosses the Daradgee bridge

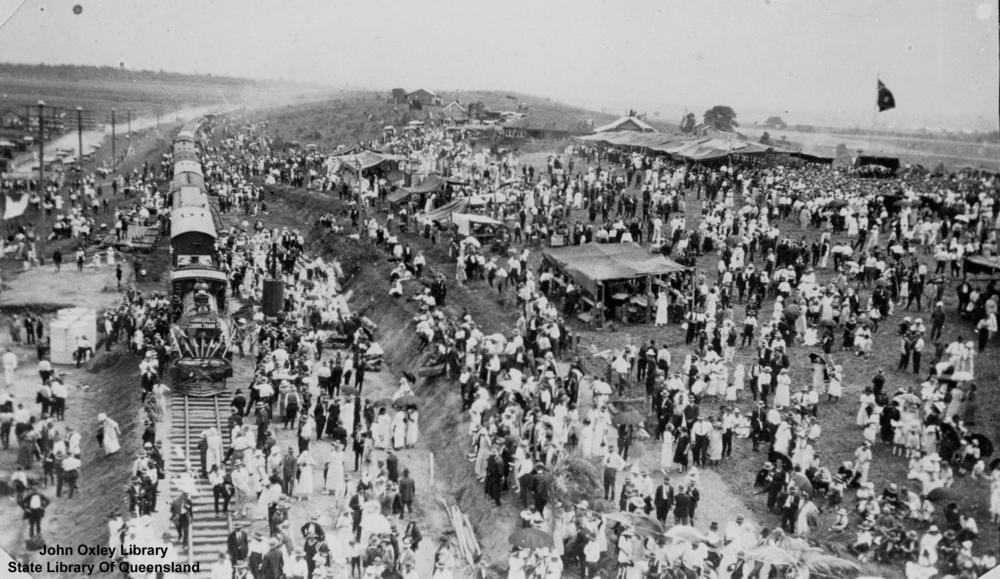
Crowd celebrating the opening of the Daradgee Bridge, 8 December 1924

=== Construction commences ===
The Cairns to Babinda and Stuart (Townsville) to Ayr tramways were purchased in 1911, and southern extensions commenced that year, together with a line south from Mackay, with the new junction station being called Paget in honour of the local politician who was Minister for Railways.

An 8 km extension south of Babinda was opened in 1912, with further work then suspended for 8 years due to the expensive bridging required to connect to Innisfail.

Construction north from Rockhampton also commenced in 1911, and the Bowen line, with a gap of only 35 km to Ayr, was connected to Townsville in 1913, including the 760 m Burdekin River bridge. Construction north of Townsville commenced that year, and all sections were opened progressively to provide access for the local communities. For example, the 111 km to Ingham was opened in seven sections between 1914 and 1919, the shortest being 8 km.

The highest point on the entire NCL is situated north of Rockhampton, at 136 metres above sea level, whilst the Burdekin River crossing was built as a low level bridge, designed to allow flood waters to flow over it with minimal damage, leading to frequent disruptions to traffic during the wet season. However, the bridge suffered major washaways in 1917, 1918, 1925, 1940 and 1945, leading to its replacement by a high level bridge in 1957.

=== Progress slows ===
Construction was slowed by the impacts of World War I, though the Don-Proserpine tramway was purchased in 1917 when construction north from Mackay commenced. Another financial crisis halted construction on that section in 1920 for 2 years. However construction continued south of Mackay, and it was linked to Rockhampton and beyond in 1921.

Although upgrading works were not completed, the connection to Townsville was opened on the centenary of John Oxley's landing at the site of Brisbane in 1823, and once works were finished in 1924 the Mail train took 38 hours from Brisbane, and express fruit specials did the journey in 40 hours.

=== A narrower gauge ===
Work north of Ingham commenced in 1919, halted in 1920 and recommenced in 1922, whilst work towards Innisfail included laying the rails to 610 mm (2 ft) gauge temporarily to facilitate delivery of construction materials via the local sugar cane tramway. The sugar mill agreed to carry passengers, and Innisfail residents could then reach Cairns by train, changing to the wider gauge at Garradunga.

=== The completion of the railway line ===
The final 94 km section, including major bridges at Daradgee, opened on 10 December 1924, enabling a 52-hour journey time from Cairns to Brisbane.

== Opening dates summary ==
A list of the section opening dates is here. This list shows the original opening date for each section, ignoring any subsequent deviations etc.

A list of the opening dates in chronological order is here. This list shows the known opening dates for all line construction, including deviations, plus the known dates of other significant NCL related events etc.

== Subsequent upgrading ==
The sections built to main line standard had a speed limit of 64 km/h, and the tramways were gradually brought to this standard in the years following their purchase.

The maximum axle load from Brisbane as far as Gympie was 8 tons in 1914, and that was extended to Bundaberg by 1918, and Rockhampton by 1924. The axle load was increased in the 1930s to 12 tons as far as Townsville.

During World War II over 30 crossing loops were added between Maryborough–Cairns to cater for the enormous growth in traffic on the line at that time.

A 1090 m high level road and rail bridge over the Burdekin River was opened in 1957, reducing wet season disruptions to traffic. High level bridges were also built at Guthalungra in 1949, over the Haughton River in 1959 and the Russell River in 1966 for the same reason.

Although not an upgrade, when steam locomotives were retired from service in the late 1960s, the removal of the 'hammer blow' of their reciprocating driving wheels enabled the maximum axle load to be increased to 15 tons, and also enabled the maximum speed to increase to 80 km/h.

=== Safeworking and signalling ===
Services were originally operated by the staff and ticket method, with electric staff later introduced from Brisbane-Avondale (north of Bundaberg) to cater for increased traffic on that section. Centralised traffic control (CTC) signalling was introduced from Toolooa (south of Gladstone)–Rockhampton in 1975 to cater for the growing coal traffic from the Blackwater area, with CTC subsequently introduced from Gympie–Avondale in 1980, Caboolture–Gympie in 1982 and Avondale–Toolooa in 1988. CTC now extends as far as Townsville, with the remainder of the line controlled by Direct Traffic Control (DTC).

=== Station upgrades ===
In linking certain isolated sections, the construction of the NCL resulted in certain station layouts that, whilst satisfactory as terminal stations, were sub-optimal as through stations, such as Maryborough, Mackay, Bowen and Townsville. It also created some undesirable or unusual line alignments, such as south of Gympie and north of Rockhampton.

The location of the original Gympie station resulted in the line from Brisbane requiring a grade of 1 in 45 (~2.2%) for the last 4 km from Monkland station. This was the steepest grade on the entire NCL, and goods trains were frequently pushed by a second locomotive specially stationed at Monkland for that purpose. The Gympie bypass mentioned below resolved that situation when it opened in 1988.

When the Burrum line was built, it junctioned from the Maryborough line at Baddow, 3 km from the station, creating a triangular junction, with platforms ultimately being provided on all three sides. Maryborough station was situated immediately adjacent to the commercial centre of the city, and converting it into a through station would have been prohibitively expensive.

When through trains commenced running from Brisbane to Bundaberg and beyond, trains ran into Maryborough, a fresh steam locomotive was attached to the other end of the train, and it then departed.

Once diesel locomotives were introduced, there was no need to replace engines, and through trains paused at Baddow on the 3rd leg of the triangular junction before proceeding north. A one carriage connecting service was provided from Maryborough to meet the through train at Baddow, and then return. As trains became longer, the platform on the 3rd leg was not of sufficient length, and the trains would stop on the platform on the line to Maryborough, having to reverse out of, or back into the platform before proceeding further, adding about 15 minutes to the journey. The situation was finally resolved with the opening of the Maryborough West bypass in 1988, detailed below.

Mackay station was able to be converted to a through station when the NCL was constructed, but that involved an alignment passing close to the city centre with multiple level crossings. When the original Pioneer River bridge required replacement to achieve a 20 tonne axle load, the opportunity was taken to create what was effectively a West Mackay bypass, built from Paget to the new bridge which was west of the existing one. The new Mackay station is located about 1 km south of Paget.

The conversion of Bowen station from a terminal station into a through station was achieved by building what is known today as a balloon loop, with all trains traveling clockwise around the loop, halting at the station, then proceeding onwards. As with Mackay, the need to replace a bridge to enable a 20 tonne axle load presented an opportunity for a short realignment providing a more direct route. The new Bowen station is situated on the western edge of the town.

The Townsville station conversion also involved the construction of a loop, but as the original station was in a narrow corridor between the city centre and the north bank of Ross Creek, expansion of the goods yard occurred on the south side of the creek. Rationalisation of the overall station layout became imperative as train length grew, and a new section of line bypassing the original station was built. The new Townsville station straddles Ross Creek.

=== Alignment upgrades ===
Deviations were opened in 1988 at Eumundi, Gympie, Maryborough and Benaraby in preparation for the electrification of the line as far as Rockhampton, providing a net reduction in route length of 7.88 km (including minor deviations at North Arm and Tamaree).

The 9.553 km Eumundi Range deviation added 0.567 km route length but eased the grade from 1 in 48 (~2.1%) to 1 in 90 (1.1%) and reduced the minimum curve to 550m radius.

The 9.575 km Gympie bypass removed the steepest grade on the entire North Coast line, reducing the grade from 1 in 45 (~2.2%) to 1 in 100 (1%), as well as reducing the route length by 2.434 km.

The 6.705 km Maryborough West project eliminated the need for passenger trains to back into or out of Baddow station as well as reducing the route length by 3.976 km.

The 15.658 kilometres (9.729 mi) realigned Benaraby bank crossed the original sharply curved alignment 8 times, and reduced the route length by 2.04 kilometres (1.27 mi).

The benefit of these deviations is demonstrated by the reduction in the Capricornian transit time from 13 hours 55 minutes to 12 hours 35 minutes without any change to motive power or train load.

A major realignment of the Gympie–Maryborough section was undertaken in the mid-1990s, finally addressing the legacy of the original 'pioneer' alignment imposed a century before.

=== Duplications ===
The section from Bowen Hills to Eagle Junction was duplicated in 1886, extended to Northgate in 1890 and Caboolture in 1917. The section from Roma Street to Bowen Hills was opened as double track, one of the few lines in Queensland so built, in 1890. The line from Caboolture to Beerburrum was duplicated when realigned in 2009, meaning the first 65 kilometres (40 mi) of the NCL is duplicated. Plans have been announced to realign and duplicate to Nambour (a further 40 km), but the completion date is 2031.

The 98 km section from Callemondah (junction for the coal unloading terminal north of Gladstone) to Rocklands (junction with the Blackwater coal system) was duplicated in sections between ~1985–95.

The 10 km from Townsville to Stuart (junction of the Mount Isa line) was duplicated in 1936, and extended a further 10 km to Nome in 1963.

Preparation for the quadruplication of the section from Roma Street to Zillmere began in the 1950s, resulting in the widening of the rail corridor and the construction of bridge pillars and the rebuild of several stations with additional (unused) platforms. Funding issues resulted in the quadruplication plan being postponed until circa 1977 when the corridor was triplicated (3 tracks) up to Northgate. The growth in patronage on suburban trains as a result of the 1980s electrification scheme resulted in the quadruplication of the Roma St–Northgate section from 1996 to 1999, including 2 pairs of single track tunnels and the utilisation of the Bowen Hills tunnel widened 20 years earlier. Triple track was continued from Northgate to Lawnton in the same era. Alongside construction of the Redcliffe Peninsula Railway Line from 2014 to 2016, a four-track bridge was built over the North Pine River between Lawnton and Petrie, providing at least a continuous 3 track corridor from Northgate to Petrie.

=== Electrification ===
The NCL between Brisbane and Rockhampton was electrified in 1989. As part of the project, minor deviations were made to improve the alignment, including new bridges over Coochin Creek (south of Beerwah), either side of Woombye, and at Curra (north of Harvey's Siding).

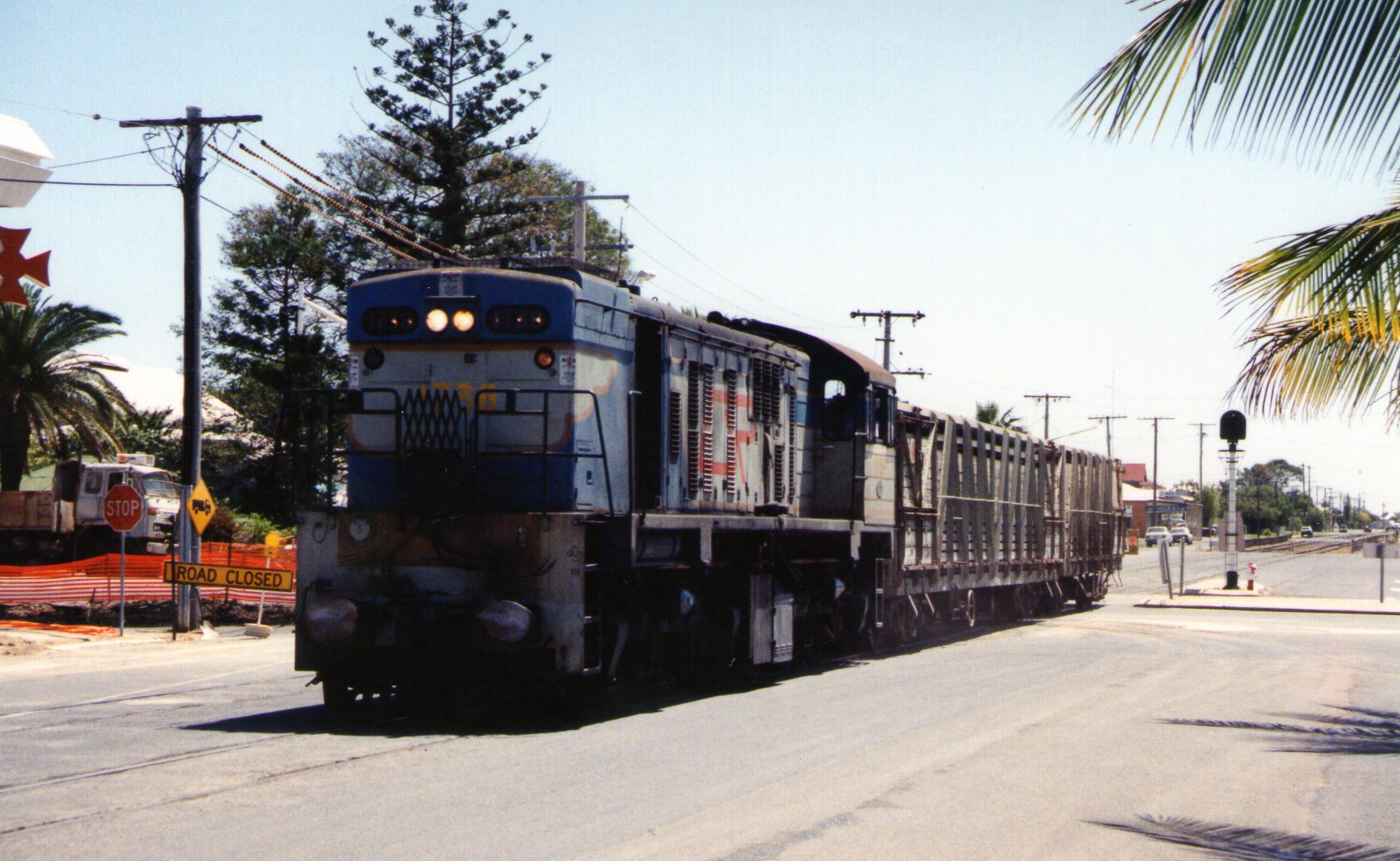
1738 hauls a short livestock train south along the Denison Street section of the NCL. This line has since been reduced to single track

=== The line in 2013 ===
The growth of traffic on the NCL has resulted in a number of improvements, including relaying with heavier rail, re-sleepering with concrete and steel sleepers and a higher axle load. The entire line now has a 20-tonne axle load and continuously welded rail. The major coal haulage section between Gladstone and Rockhampton is 60 kg/m (121.0 lb/yd) rail, whilst the balance of the line to Townsville is a combination of 50 and 53 kg/m (100.8 and 106.8 lb/yd) & 60 kg/m (121.0 lb/yd). The Townsville-Cairns section is 41 and 47 kg/m (82.7 and 94.7 lb/yd) & 53 kg/m (106.8 lb/yd). The lower weight rail is used for passing loops.

When it was decided to connect the Rockhampton and North Rockhampton lines by bridging the Fitzroy River, land purchase costs were saved by building the line from Rockhampton station along Denison Street for 1.85 km, and this alignment is still utilised today. This section is the only line in Queensland to have been opened as dual track and subsequently been reduced to a single track, to ensure two trains are not on the Alexandra Bridge at the same time, as having been built in 1897 it has a limited load capacity.

The maximum speed is 100 km/h to Townsville, with the tilt trains permitted 160 km/h to Mackay, and 140 km/h beyond. The Townsville–Cairns limit is 80 km/h with the tilt train permitted 100 km/h.

Since 2008, the North Coast railway has been identified as requiring major improvements as its speed is becoming uncompetitive with road transport.

== Branch/connecting lines ==
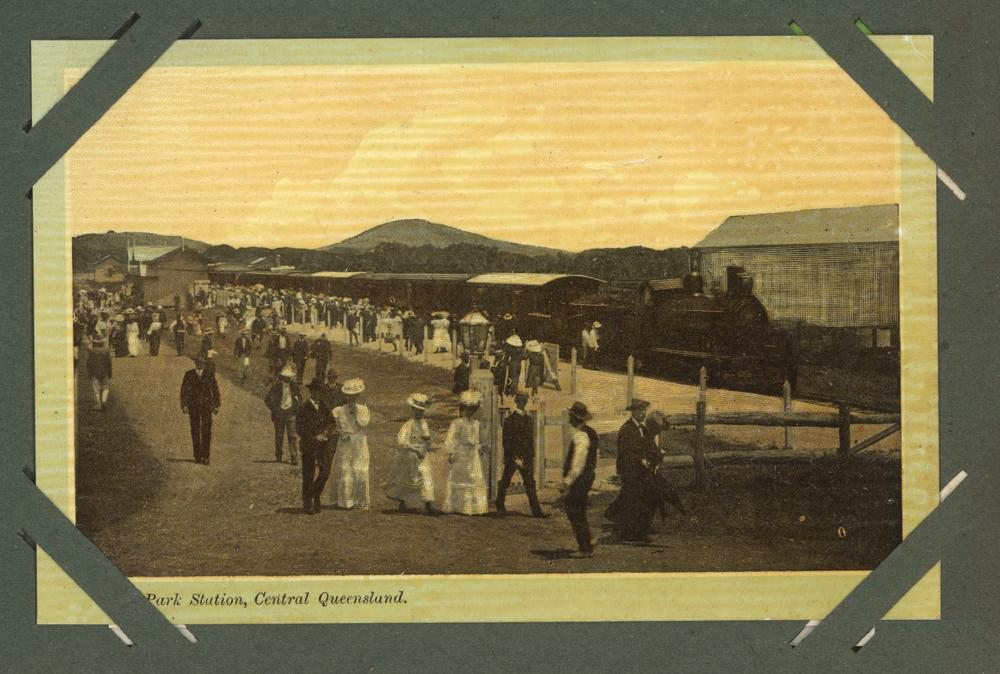
Passengers at the Emu Park Railway Station ~1890

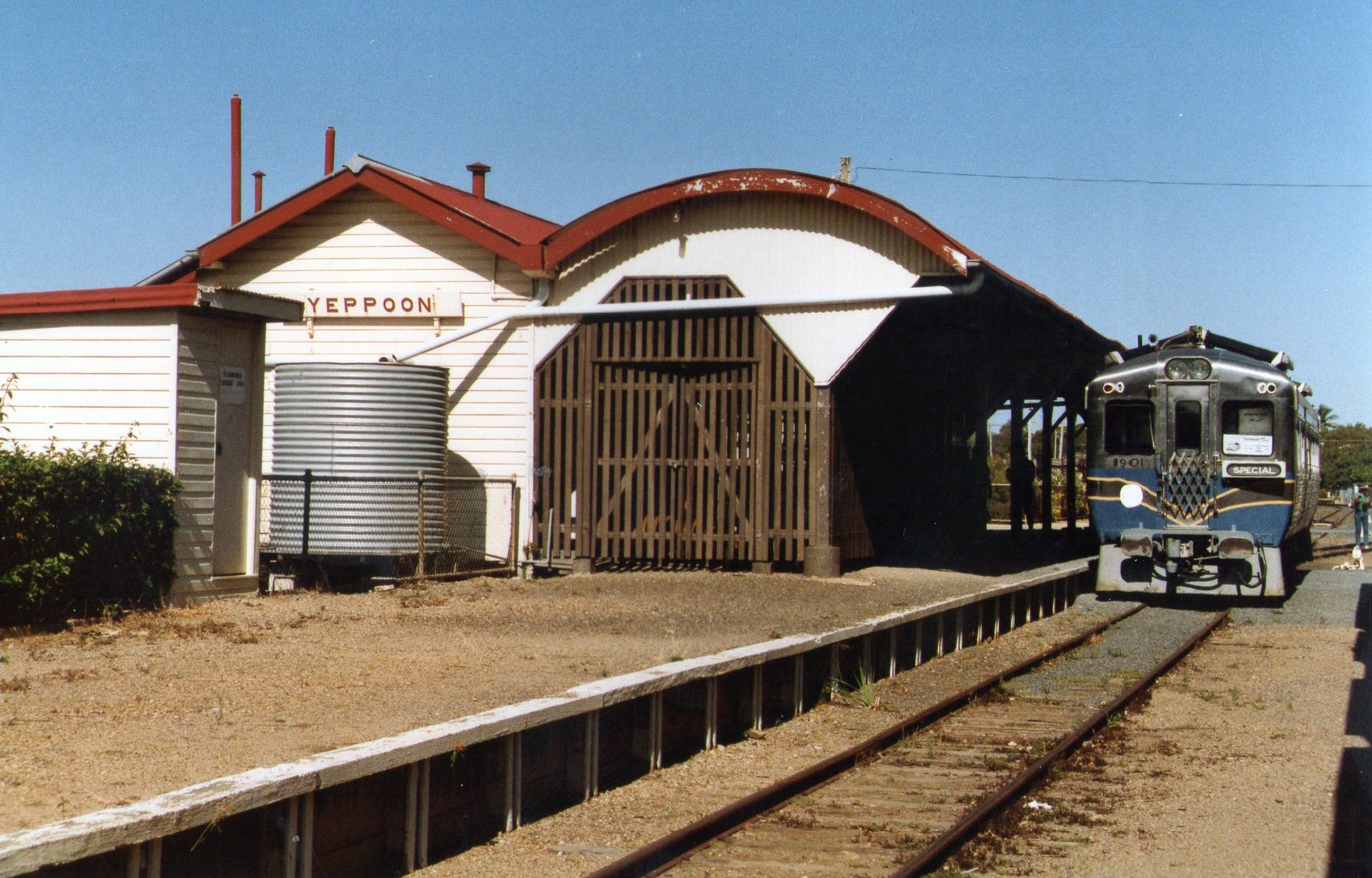
RM 1901 at Yeppoon station, ~1991

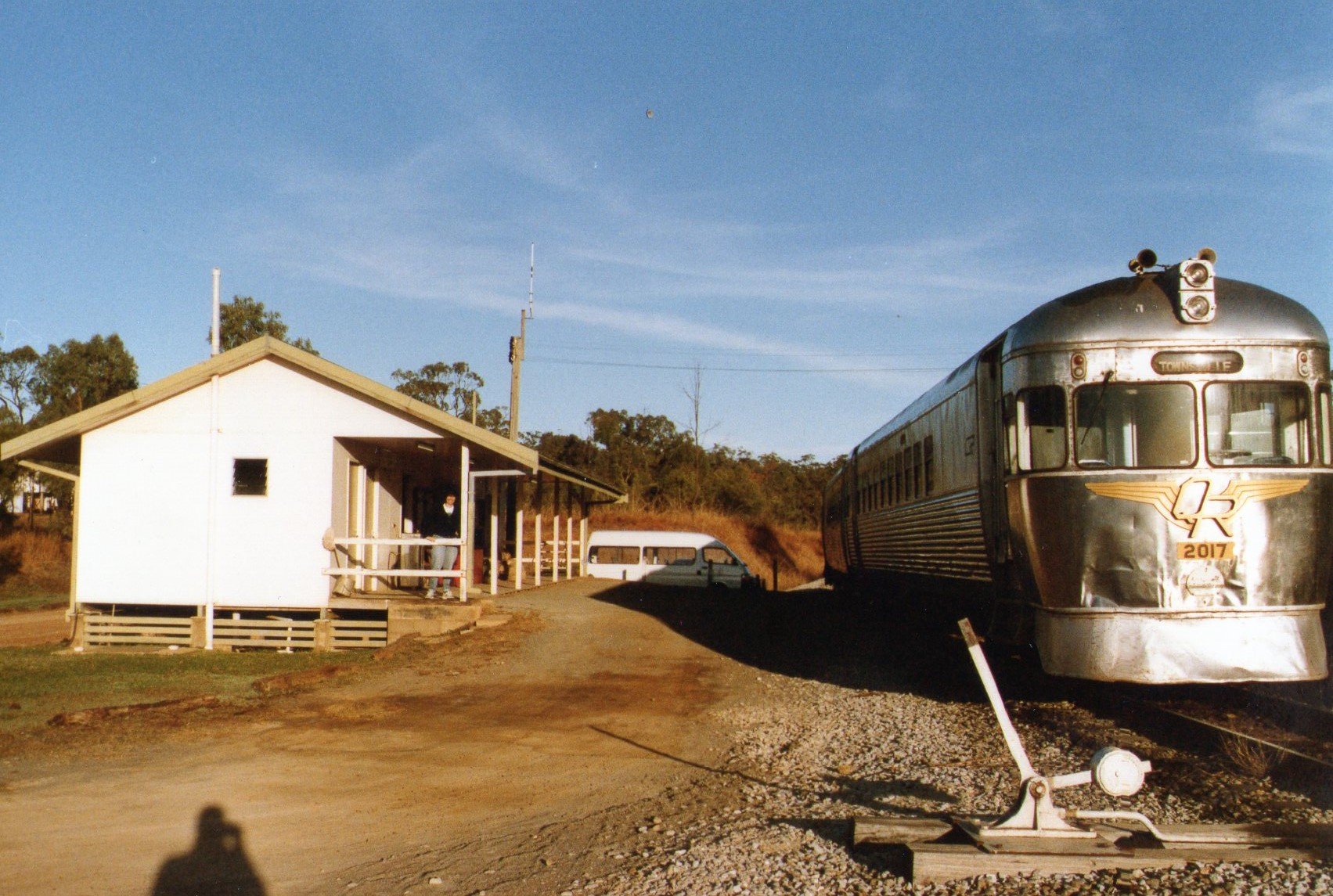
RM 2017 at Greenvale station about to depart on the fortnightly service to Townsville, ~1991

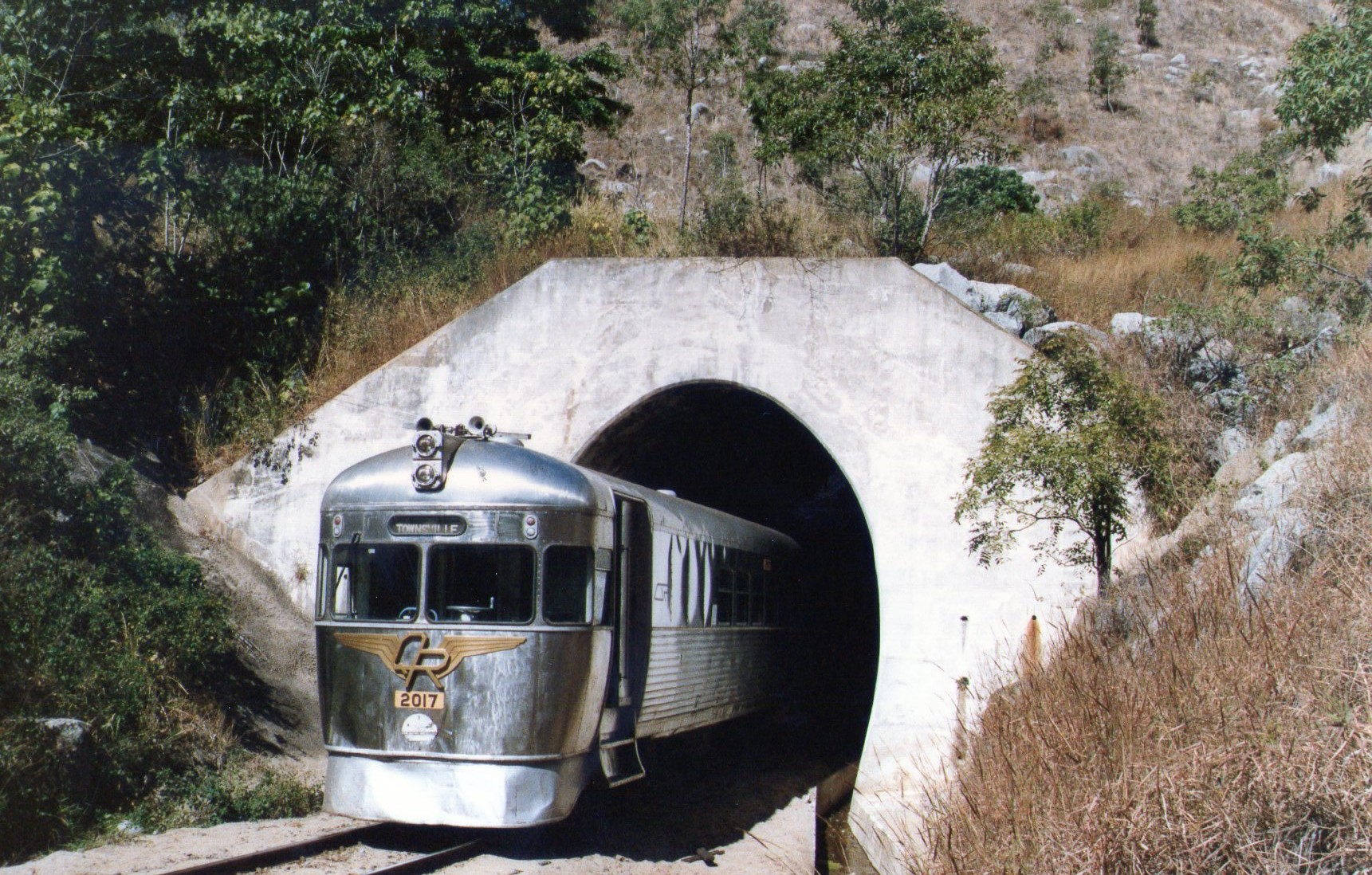
RM 2017 emerges from a tunnel in the Hervey Range on the Greenvale to Yabulu line, ~1991

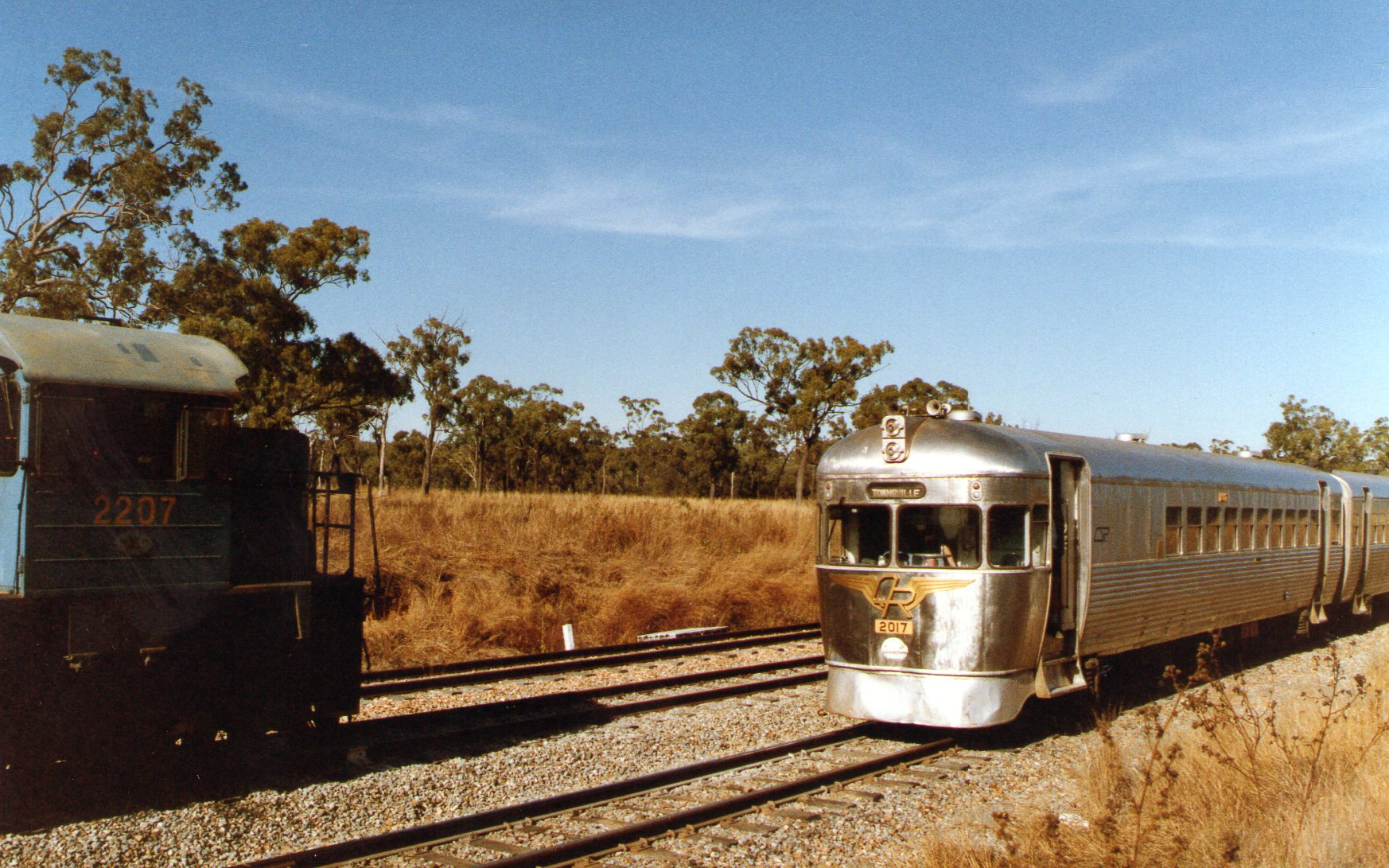
RM 2017 crosses an empty nickel ore train hauled by 2207, on the Gereenvale to Yabulu line ~1991

Many rural lines do or did branch off the North Coast Line. They are listed below from south to north.

Caboolture–Kilcoy 56 km opened between 1909 and 1913, closed 1964 when it was decided not to relocate the line for the raising of the Somerset Dam, except for the 11 km to Wamuran which remained for pineapple farmers to ship to a Brisbane cannery, that section closing in 1996.

Buderim Tramway – an 11.5 km, 2 ft 6 in (762 mm) gauge line was opened from Palmwoods station (33 m asl) to Buderim (185 m asl) by the Maroochy Shire Council in 1914, built at a cost of £34,000. The local community's enthusiasm for the line can be seen from the fact that 72% of the land required for the tramway (55 acres or 22 hectares) was donated. Two services a day were operated, plus additional runs during fruit harvesting season. The journey time was one hour, with a return fare being 5/- (five shillings) and freight costing 17/6 (17 shillings and sixpence) per long ton. Two locomotives were operated, a Shay locomotive, noted as out of service in 1932, and a Krauss tank locomotive, which has been preserved at Buderim. The line closed in 1935 due to the loss of fruit and timber traffic to road transport.

Mapleton Tramway – The Moreton Central Sugar Mill at Nambour (~20 m asl) commenced operation in 1897 and constructed a series of 2 ft (610 mm) gauge tramways to carry sugar cane to the mill. Land at Dulong, (west of Nambour and ~240 m asl) was considered suitable for sugar cane cultivation so a 9 km line was constructed between 1897 and 1905 with 1 in 20 (5%) grades and 2 chain (~40 m) radius curves, initially horse operated, and featuring a ~15 m deep cutting through rock to avoid the need for two tunnels. A Shay locomotive was purchased in 1908, but despite the improved economics of locomotive hauled trains, sugar cane cultivation declined at Dulong in favour of fruit growing and dairy farming. The mill commenced public haulage of passengers and freight on the line in 1909, which led to calls by the residents of Mapleton (~360 m asl) for the line to be extended there. The sugar mill had no interest in doing so, and the Maroochy Shire Council purchased the line and rollingstock in 1914 and extended the line a further 9 km the following year, purchasing a second Shay locomotive at the same time. The journey time was two hours, and initially two services per day (Sunday excepted) were timetabled, with a fare of 2/– to Mapleton, 3d (three pennies) per case of fruit and freight at 7/6 per ton. In 1929 the service was reduced to one train per day. A sawmill at Mapleton was purchased by the Hornibrook construction company in the early 1930s, and the hardwood piles and girders for the Hornibrook Bridge were transported by the tramway, transferring to QR trains at Nambour. The line was closed in 1944 and purchased by the mill, which continued to operate the first 2 km section for seasonal sugar cane haulage until 1970. The mill closed in 2003. One of the Shay locomotives is preserved at Nambour.

Monkland–Brooloo 44 km opened between 1914 and 1915, the Mary Valley Railway branched off near Gympie. Closed between 1993 and 1995, a heritage group operated the Valley Rattler as far as Imbil until 2012. A 1920 approved extension to Kenilworth was never constructed.

Theebine–Murgon system The first section of a network of branches, opened 1886, now all closed.

Monto Loop branched off at Mungar near Maryborough, and rejoined the NCL at Gladstone, closed 1 July 2012.

Colton–Urangan opened between 1896 and 1913, initially to facilitate sugar exports. Closed 1993.

Isis Junction–Dallarnal 81 km opened between 1887 and 1913, closed between 1955 and 1964.

Bundaberg–Pemberton 23 km opened between 1894 and 1912, closed between 1948 and 1959 except for the first 3 km serving industries, which closed in 1995.

North Bundaberg–Mount Perry 105 km opened between 1881–84 to serve a copper mine and smelter. Sugar cane later became the main traffic east of Gin Gin, and the section west of there closed in 1960. The remainder closed in 1993.

Gladstone–Monto the northern junction of the Monto-Mungar Junction loop mentioned above, closed beyond Taragoola 1 July 2012.

Bajool–Port Alma 26 km opened 1912 to provide an additional port for Rockhampton, the last 10 km closed in 1986, the remainder serving a salt works until closure in 1990.

Rockhampton–Winton the Central West Line opened 1867–1928. The Spirit of the Outback passenger service operates between Brisbane and Longreach.

Alton Downs Junction–Ridgelands 28 km opened 1916, closed 1955 except the first 1 km to a siding, which closed in 1968.

North Rockhampton–Emu Park 47 km opened 1888 in order to provide a line to the seaside for Rockhampton, with subsequent lines opening from Nankin Junction to Broadmount (24 km) in 1898 and Sleipner Junction to Yeppoon (32 km) in 1909. The Broadmount line closed in 1929, being the first branch line closed by QR. The Emu Park-Sleipner Junction section closed in 1964, and the Yeppoon line beyond Lakes Creek ~2007. 'Suburban' frequency (14/day) services were provided between Rockhampton and the abattoir at Lakes Creek for workers between 1913 and 1930.

Goonyella coal system, technically not a branch of the NCL, it parallels the line for ~5 km between Yukan and Sarina, before crossing the NCL on a flyover to the Hay Point coal loading port.

Mackay–Netherdale 81 kilometres (50 mi) opened between 1885 and 1911. Closed between 1977 and 2007.

Merinda–Collinsville opened 1922 to haul coal, extended to Newlands in 1984 and to North Goonyella (connecting to the Goonyella system) in 2012.

Townsville–Mt Isa the Great Northern line junctions at Stuart, with The Inlander passenger service operating to Mount Isa.

Innisfail Tramway – Until 1910 Innisfail was known as Geraldton. An 11 km 2 ft (610 mm) gauge tramway was built from Mourilyan Harbour to the South Johnstone River about 5 km south of Geraldton in 1883 to facilitate construction of the Mourilyan sugar mill. By 1898 there were ~64 kilometres (40 mi) of sugar tramways in the Geraldton district servicing the Mourilyan and Goondi mills. The Geraldton Shire Council decided to build a 36 kilometres (22 mi) line to service the upper Johnston River valley, which opened to Nerada in 1902 featuring 1 in 30 (3.3%) grades and 3 chain (~60 m) radius curves. 2 ft (610 mm) gauge was chosen because of the existing tramways, and a branchline was built to service the South Johnstone mill (situated about 8 km further upstream from the Mourilyan mill). In addition to seasonal sugar cane, the line hauled passengers, bananas and timber. Under the provisions of the North Coast Railway Act 1910 ('NCRA'), QR purchased the tramway from the Innisfail Shire Council in 1915, as well as the Mourilyan Harbour line from the Mourilyan mill and constructed a 5 km line featuring a 123 m timber trestle bridge over the South Johnstone River to connect the two lines. The NCRA authorised construction of a 3 ft 6 in (1,067 mm) gauge line from Innisfail to Mourilyan Harbour, and the QR purchase of the tramway lines was to enable transportation of construction materials for the NCL to a major works site established at Innisfail, a 4.9 kilometres (3.0 mi) extension of the tramline to the QR station site being built for that purpose, with an engine shed that serviced both 3 ft 6 in (1,067 mm) and 2 ft (610 mm) QR locos. WW1 meant that construction of the NCL north and south from Innisfail did not start until 1920, and in the meantime QR operated the 'Innisfail Tramway' with 11 mixed services per week plus additional trains to haul sugar cane in season. Processed sugar from the South Johnstone mill began to be hauled to Mourilyan Harbour, and this traffic grew to the extent that a balloon loop was built at the expanded port to facilitate unloading in 1922. The NCL opened in 1924, connecting Innisfail to Townsville and Cairns, and while a short 3 ft 6 in (1,067 mm) branch was built to the South Johnstone mill, the proposed 3 ft 6 in (1,067 mm) line to Mourilyan Harbour was not, and QR continued to operate the tramway. While passenger numbers declined from ~108,000 in 1922 to ~6,000 in 1937, and ceased in 1948, freight loadings grew from ~61,000 long tons (including 20,000 tons of cane) in 1922 to ~130,000 tons (95% cane) in 1934. Diesel locomotives were introduced in 1954, with steam locomotion ceasing in 1962, enabling tonnage to reach ~300,000 in 1967. Despite having an operating ratio of 43.9% in 1969, the tramway was seen as a non-core asset by QR and sold to the South Johnstone mill in 1977, which continues to operate the majority of the system for sugar cane haulage, though the transportation of processed sugar to Mourilyan Harbour was replaced by road transport in 1997. A Rail ambulance operated on the tramway from 1915 until the early 1930s.

Cairns–Forsyth the Tablelands system west of Cairns includes the Savannahlander tourist passenger tour, a 4-day round trip.

== Services ==
=== Passenger services ===
Initially all trains were 'mixed', carrying both goods and passengers. It was an efficient method for areas with low population, and whilst not quick by today's standards, it was still a vast improvement on horse-drawn coaches and wagons.

When the Brisbane and Maryborough systems were connected in 1891, through passenger trains were introduced, including sleeping cars but without dining cars, as refreshment stops were made to coincide with the need to water steam locomotives every 80 km or so. The train departed Roma Street at 7:50 am, arriving at Gympie at 1 pm, Maryborough at 4 pm and Bundaberg at 6:45 pm. The return service departed 7:10 am, arriving at Roma Street at 6:10 pm. In 1898 the Brisbane–Bundaberg transit time was reduced to 10 hours, with a further 5 hours required to travel to Gladstone.

When the steamer service from Gladstone was introduced (see 'Temporary resistance' above), the 'Boat Mail' began running, and after the extension to Rockhampton opened, a weekly Boat Mail still ran (until 1923) to connect to the Townsville steamer service.

=== Rockhampton services ===
In 1903 the Rockhampton Mail began running 3 times per week, departing Brisbane at 10 pm and arriving at Rockhampton 4 pm the following day. The return services departed Rockhampton at noon, arriving at Brisbane at 6 am the following morning. The breakfast (and dinner for the southbound services) stop was at Bundaberg, and the trains averaged 64 km/h (40 mph).

Foot-warmers were introduced for first class passengers as far as Bundaberg in 1911, and provided each winter until 1958.

There were six Rockhampton Mail trains/week in 1914, reduced to 5 times per week in the 1930s.

In 1938 a new series of passenger cars were introduced, known as Sunshine cars.

The introduction of diesel locomotives in 1952 enabled the Brisbane-Rockhampton transit time to be reduced by 2.25 hours. Until then increases in steam locomotive power over time had been matched by increased train weight, meaning the transit time had not significantly changed for 50 years.

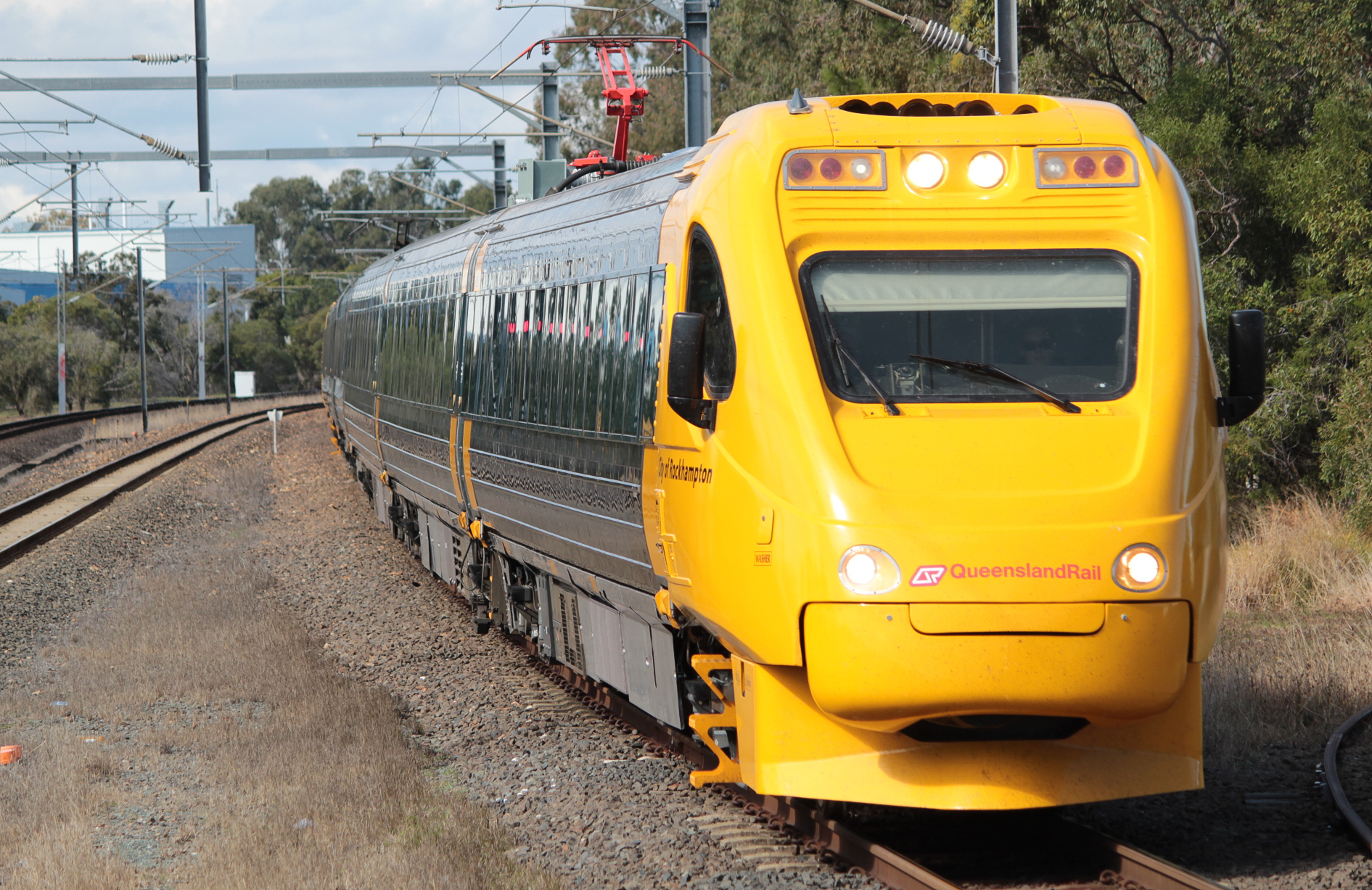
An Electric Tilt Train

When The Sunlander air-conditioned express train to Cairns was introduced in 1953, the Rocky Mail retained its wooden carriages, and a surcharge and booking restrictions deterred Rockhampton bound travellers from using the air-conditioned services. Following the construction of further air-conditioned cars, the Capricornian replaced the Rockhampton Mail in 1970, taking 14.25 hours for the overnight trip and running 5 times per week. It was replaced by the Spirit of the Outback in 1993, which runs from Brisbane to Longreach, largely to cater for the 'rail cruising' tourism market.

Following the electrification of the NCL to Rockhampton in 1988, a new intercity multiple unit train, the Spirit of Capricorn was introduced as a daytime service. With a maximum speed of 120 km/h, the transit time was reduced to 9 hours.

The current daytime service is provided by Queensland's Electric Tilt Train, introduced in 1998 with a maximum service speed of 160 km/h, and a transit time of 7 hours and 30 minutes.

=== Townsville and Cairns services ===
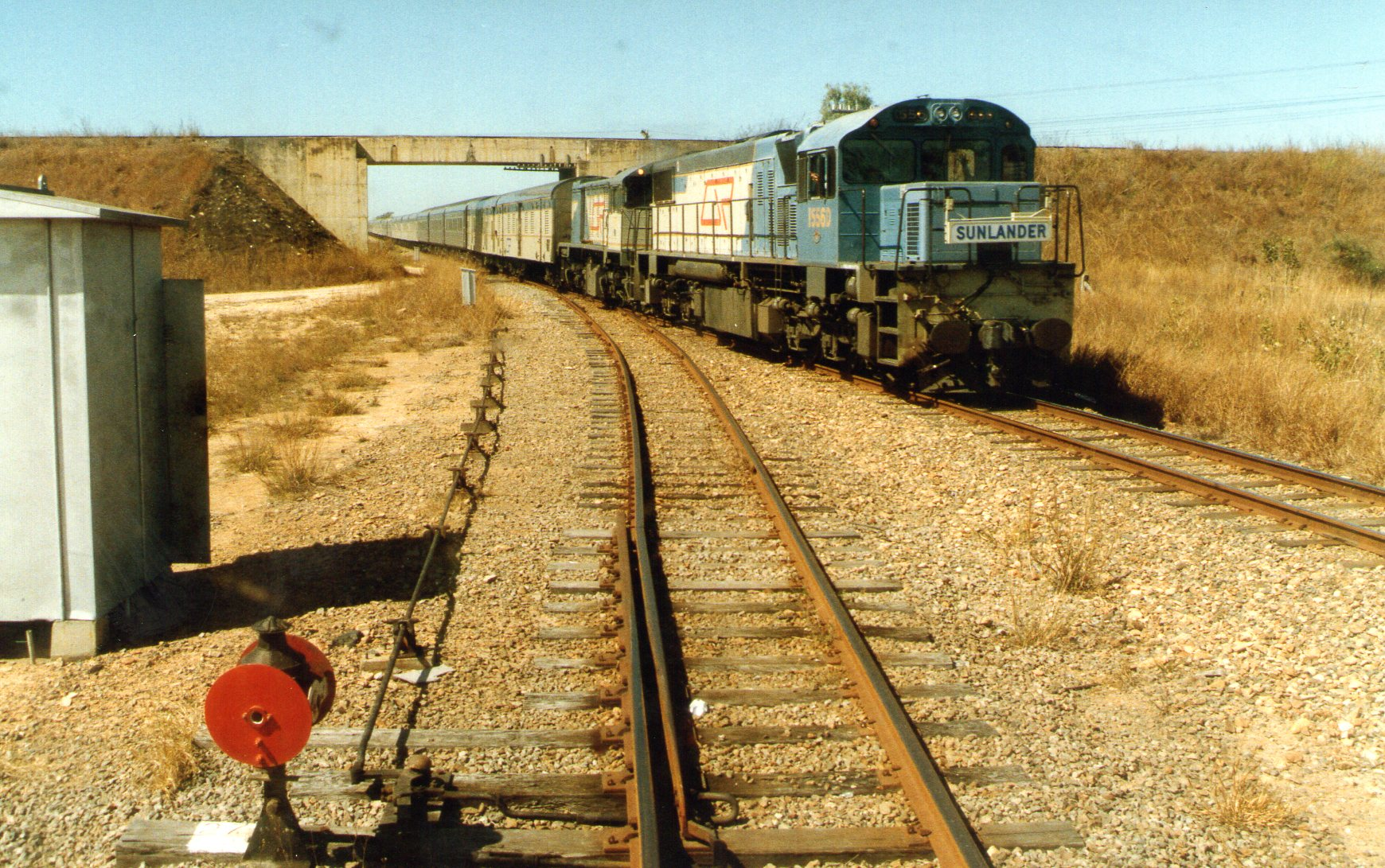
1556 and a 1720 class haul The Sunlander northbound through Yabulu, ~1991. The Greenvale line flyover is in the background

When introduced in 1923, the Townsville Mail ran twice per week. Departing Brisbane at 2:20 pm, it arrived at Rockhampton at 7 am the following morning, Mackay at 5 pm, Bowen 11:20 pm and Townsville at 5:30 am on the second morning. The return service departed Townsville at 9 pm, arriving at Brisbane 11:15 am on the second morning.

When the connection opened to Cairns the following year, one train per week continued on from Townsville after a 2-hour break, arriving at Cairns at 6:30 pm. The return service departed at 6:50 am, arriving at Townsville at 5:10 pm, and continued south after an hours' break, arriving at Brisbane at 7:20 am, 48.5 hours after leaving Cairns.

Following the opening of the Sydney–Brisbane standard gauge line in 1930, the NCL timetable was rearranged to facilitate connections to the new line. The northbound Mail departed Brisbane at 7 pm, arriving at Townsville at 7:30 am on the second day, and Cairns at 6 pm. Return departure from Cairns was at 7:40 am, Townsville at 5:50 pm arriving Brisbane at 6:30 am on the second day. The parlour car that had been part of the Sydney Mail to Wallangarra was transferred to the Townsville Mail, and a buffet car (replaced by a full dining car in 1931) was added from Rockhampton-Mackay and return.

In May 1935 the first all roller-bearing equipped train in Australia was introduced, called the Sunshine Express, with six services to Townsville each week, reduced to four per week during the wet season. Three trains per week continued to Cairns, on the other three days a rail motor provided the connection. The parlour car was withdrawn during World War 2 and never replaced.

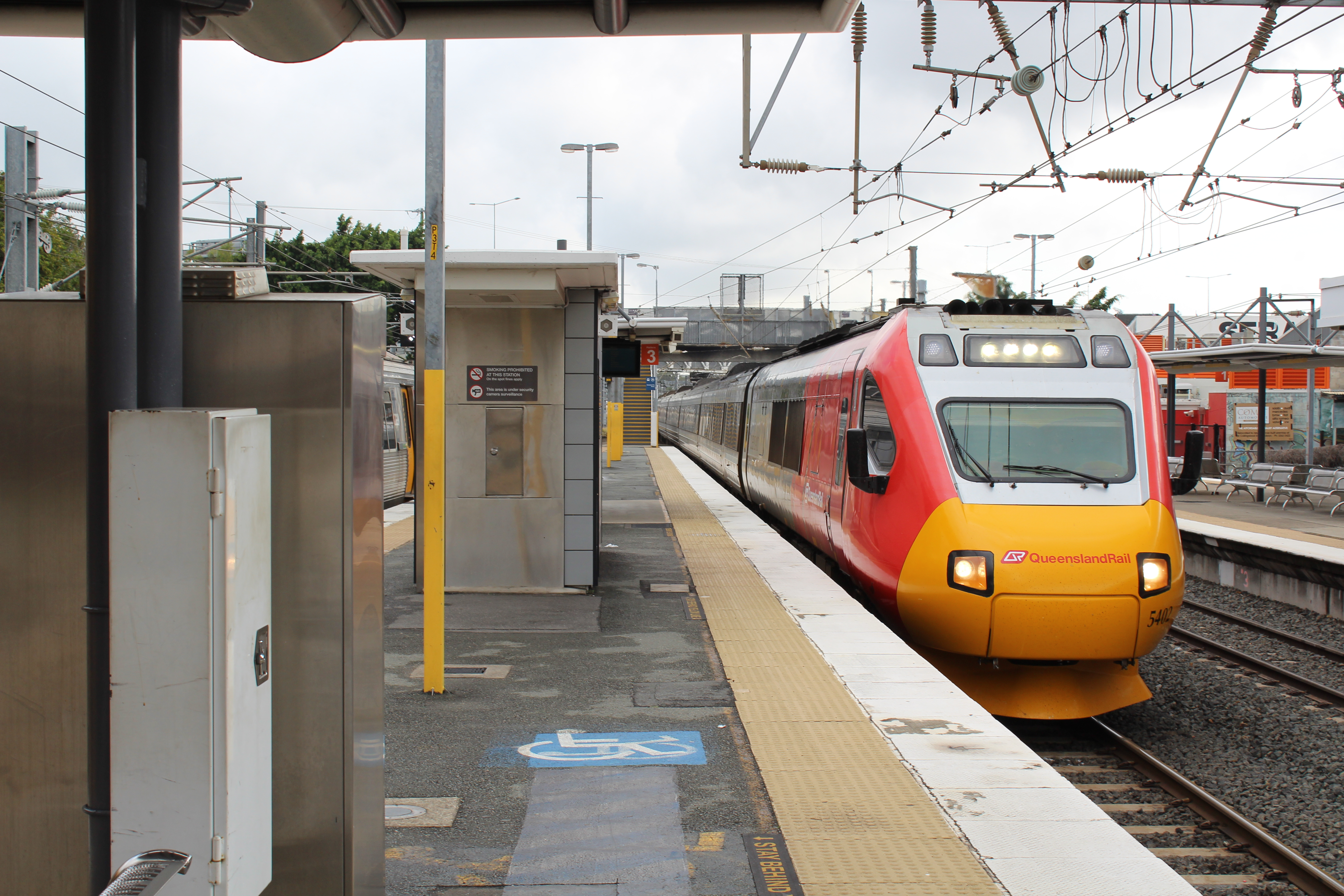
A Diesel Tilt Train at Bowen Hills station

In 1953 the air-conditioned Sunlander was introduced, diesel hauled, with the dining car attached at Bundaberg and detached at Mackay. The diesel locomotive reduced the northbound transit time by 2.75 hours, with the train departing Brisbane at 9:30 pm, Bundaberg 6:05 am, Townsville 5:45 am the second morning and arriving Cairns at 2:40 pm. The return service departed Cairns at 2 pm, arriving Brisbane at 6:30 am the second morning, a 4-hour improvement on the steam hauled journey. In 1970 the dining car was attached to the train for the entire journey, until that time the train had stopped for meal breaks at Townsville and Tully. Today, services between Brisbane, Townsville and Cairns are provided by the Diesel Tilt Train, with a duration of 24 hours.

=== Suburban services ===
Relatively high frequency services were provided between Townsville and the Oolbun meatworks (serviced by a short branch from Nome) from 1916 to 1930, with the services being retained as far as Stuart until 1969.

Similar services ran between Cairns and Gordonvale from 1927 to 1969.

=== Travelling Post Offices ===
Travelling Post Offices (TPO) operated on the line between October 1900 and 1930. They were housed in a separate van where mail was collected, sorted and delivered as the train was in motion. At places where the train did not usually stop, mail arms were erected, from which an occupant of the mail van could retrieve a mail bag whilst the train was travelling; deliveries were effected by dropping a bag of mail onto the platform.

The first NCL TPO service was from Brisbane to Bundaberg. In 1908 it was extended to Rockhampton. From 1924 mail was carried by train beyond Rockhampton to Townsville but without a TPO service being established. Up to six TPOs were operated at the same time to meet staffing and timetable requirements.

=== Freight services ===
In 1905 a goods wagon loaded in Brisbane on a Monday afternoon would be available for unloading in Rockhampton the following Friday. By 1912 improvements to locomotives, the line itself and timetabling improvements enabled an acceleration so that goods wagons would be available for unloading in Rockhampton on the following Thursday, and by 1919 on the following Wednesday.

In 1926 the fastest regular goods service from Brisbane to Townsville took 79 hours. By 1929 it had been accelerated to 66 hours, and to 42 hours in 1931.

As an indication of the amount of freight moved on the NCL during the height of World War 2, in 1943–44, 54% of the entire system's gross tonnage was hauled on the line, yet the NCL recorded only 16% of the route mileage that year.

Following the introduction of diesel locomotives on NCL freight trains in the 1950s, express goods trains took 14.25 hours from Brisbane to Rockhampton, and 37 hours to Townsville.

In 1965 there were 15 express goods trains from Brisbane to Townsville per week, which had increased to 19 per week by 1975.

Express goods wagons were attached to The Sunlander north of Townsville in the 1950s, technically making it a mixed train for the section to Cairns.

Freight services today are operated by Aurizon and Pacific National Queensland. More than 11 million net tonnes of produce are transported via the line annually, including sugar, grain, minerals and cattle.

== See also ==
- Rail transport in Queensland
- List of tramways in Queensland
