= Curra railway station =

Former railway station in Queensland, Australia

Curra

General information
- Location: Curra Road, Curra, Queensland
- Coordinates: 26°04′16″S 152°35′28″E
- Line: North Coast Line
- Connections: no connections

History
- Closed: Yes

Services
Preceding station	Queensland Rail	Following station
Corella towards Brisbane	North Coast line	Theebine towards Cairns
Location

Curra railway station is a closed railway station on Queensland's North Coast railway line. Nothing remains of the closed station.
