= Old Townsville railway station =

Former railway station in Queensland, Australia

Coordinates: 19°15′50″S 146°48′52″E

Old Townsville
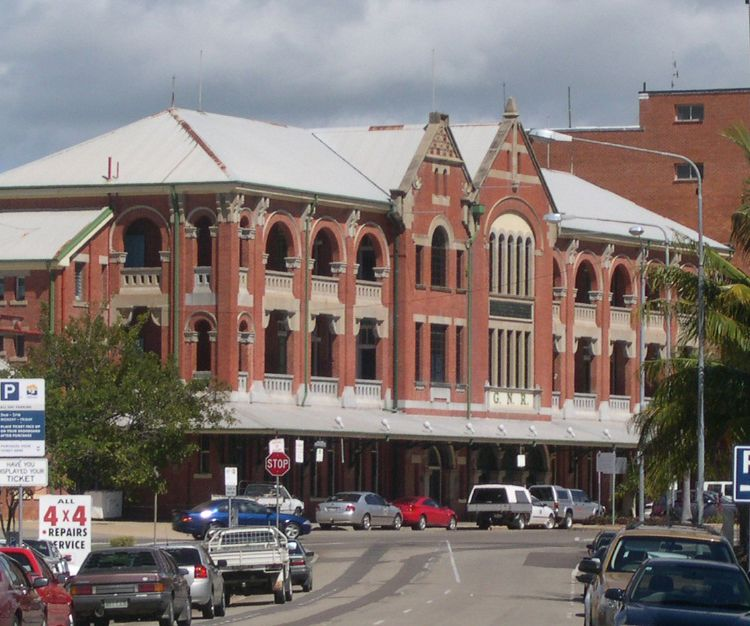
- Old Townsville railway station, 2006

General information
- Location: Flinders Street, Townsville
- Owner: Queensland Rail
- Operator: Traveltrain
- Line: North Coast

Construction
- Structure type: Ground

History
- Opened: 24 December 1913
- Closed: May 2003
Location

Old Townsville railway station, formerly the Great Northern Railway Station, is a three-storey red brick structure on Flinders Street in Townsville CBD, Queensland, Australia. The original terminus for the Great Northern Railway, the station became important in the economic growth of Townsville during the early 20th century. The building is featured in a number of famous photos taken during victory celebrations following World War II. A new station to service Townsville was built in the early 21st century and the platform is used for displays of historical photographs and articles. The building still houses Queensland Rail administrative offices.

== Building ==
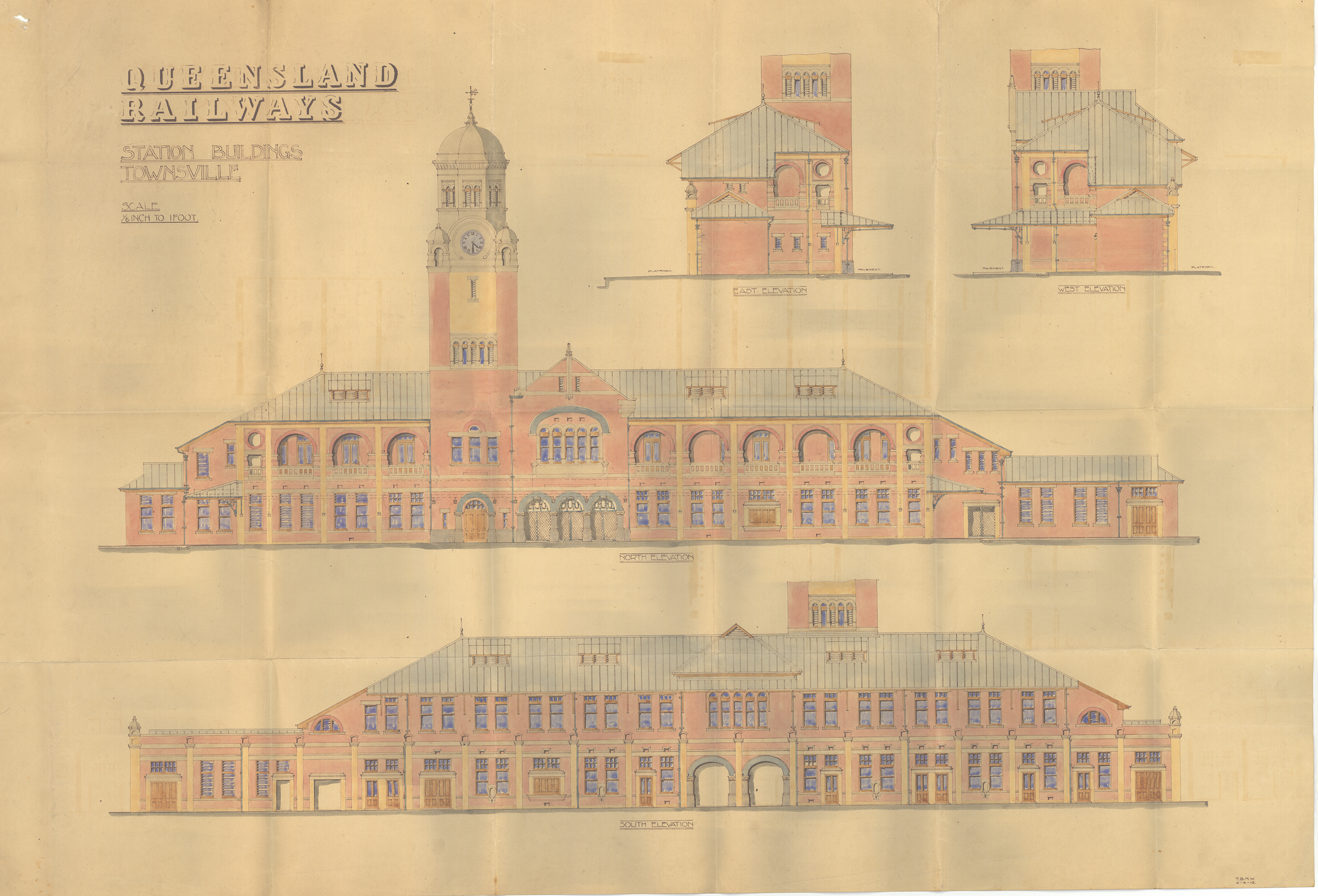
Architectural plans for the Townsville railway station, 1910

Constructed in a style similar to the great 19th century railway stations of Europe and Great Britain, the three-storey red brick structure is located on the corner of Flinders and Blackwood Streets at the western end of the Townsville central business district. The facade of the building features balustraded verandas on the first and second storeys of the building's facade, with two prominent gabled extrusions from the main structure which identify the passenger and administrative entrances the building. The facade of the building also features a large awning supported by large iron brackets. The main roof of the structure is hipped with a number of small side-structures at the eastern end of the building, which also feature hipped roofs. A four-storey brick addition was erected at the western end of the building in 1965 and features a distinctly different architectural style to the rest of the structure.

Few of the building's original features remain intact. However, the former ticket hall features all its original fittings, including tiled floors and walls, as well as an honour board for railway workers who died during World War I. The female toilets on the ground floor also contain an original, though repainted, pressed metal ceiling. Most of the administrative areas of the building have been refitted over the years as office usage has changed. However, a large internal square stairwell with stick balustrading is still intact, as well as the large french doors with glass fanlights, which open onto the verandas on the upper levels of the structure.

== History ==
Great Northern Railway Station during post-war victory celebrations on 10 June 1946

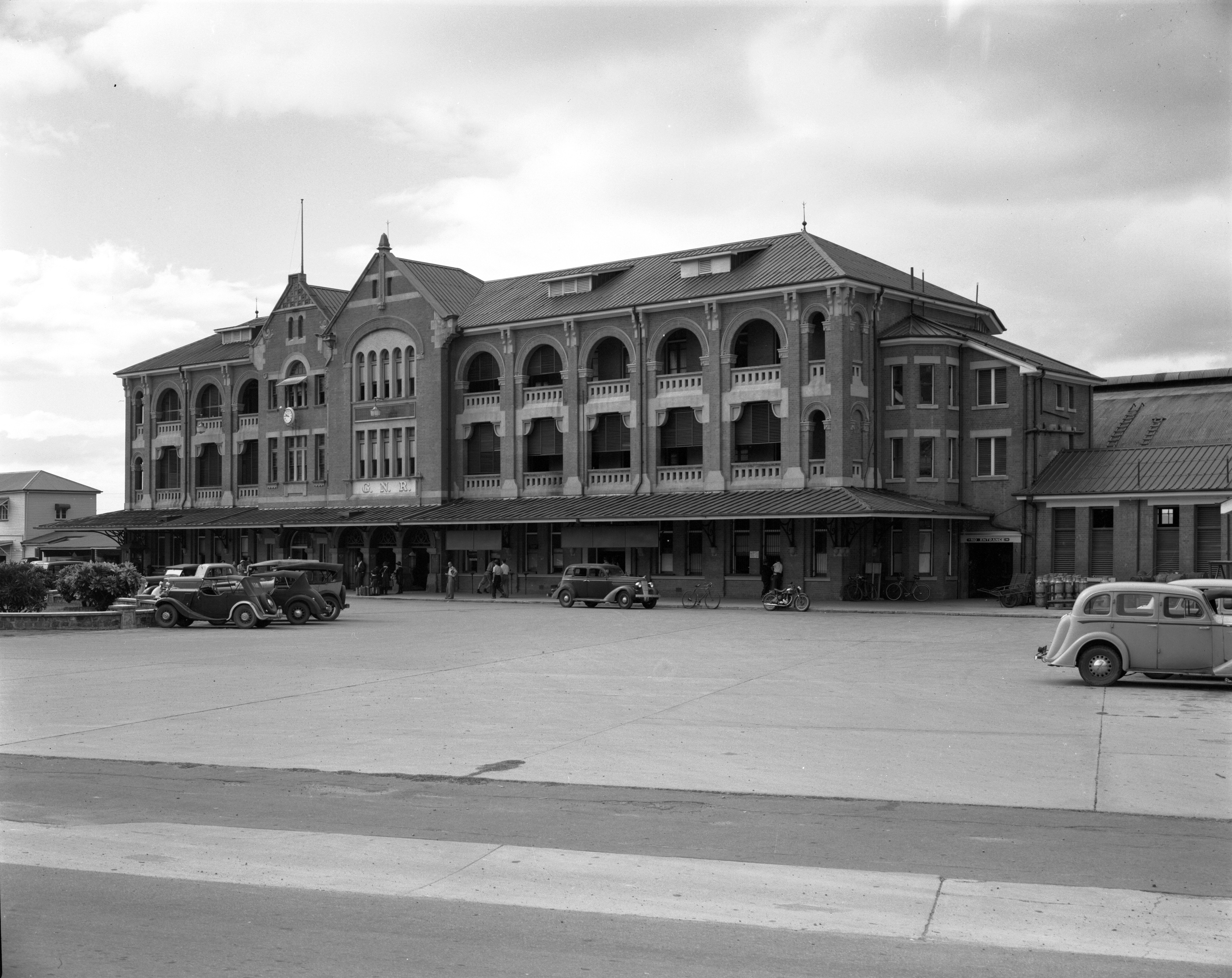
Townsville railway station, 1952

Designed by an architectural draftsman in the government railway department, Vincent Price, the building was constructed between 1910 and 1913, and was officially opened on 24 December 1913. It replaced an existing station of significantly smaller scale only a few hundred metres to the west, near the corner of Flinders and Jones Streets. It was designed as a terminus for the Great Northern Railway and housed the general manager and other ancillary staff of the company. The station operated through the Second World War, playing a significant role in the movement of goods too and from Townsville (a major military base) during that period.

It has been placed on the state's its heritage register.

== Closure ==
The station was closed when the new Townsville railway station was opened in 2003. The rail tracks through the city centre were then removed.
