= Tamaree railway station =

Former railway station in Queensland, Australia

Tamaree

General information
- Location: Tamaree Road, Tamaree, Queensland
- Coordinates: 26°07′51″S 152°39′56″E
- Line: North Coast Line
- Distance: 179.54 km (111.56 mi) from Central
- Connections: no connections

History
- Closed: Yes

Services
Preceding station	Queensland Rail	Following station
Banks Pocket Siding towards Brisbane	North Coast line	Corella towards Cairns
Location

Tamaree railway station is a closed railway station on Queensland's North Coast railway line. Nothing remains of the closed station buildings, though a small part of the concrete platform remains in place.

On 18 October 1947, eight people were killed and twenty-two injured in a mail train collision at Tamaree.
