= Queensland Railways 1900 class rail motor =

Queensland Railways 1900 class railmotor
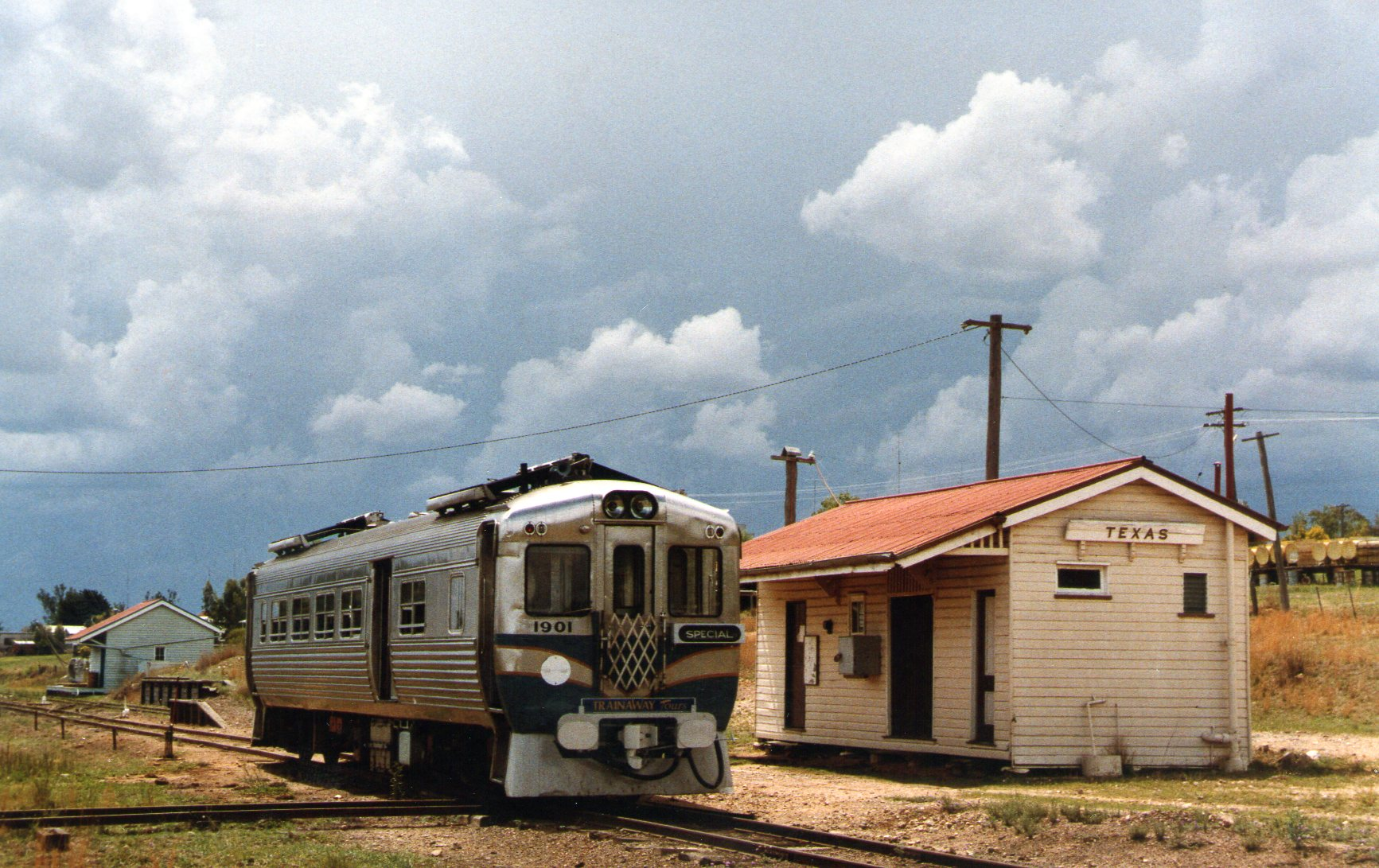
- 1901 at Texas in 1991
- Manufacturer: Comeng, Rocklea, Queensland
- Built at: Granville
- Constructed: 1956
- Entered service: 1957
- Scrapped: 1988 (RM1900)
- Number built: 2
- Number preserved: 1
- Number scrapped: 1
- Design code: RM
- Fleet numbers: 1900–1901
- Capacity: 58 passengers (RM1900); 50 passengers (RM1901)
- Operators: Queensland Railways

Specifications
- Car length: 16.76 m (55 ft 0 in)
- Width: 2.79 m (9 ft 2 in)
- Maximum speed: 50 miles per hour (80 km/h)
- Prime mover(s): 2 x AEC AH590
- Power output: 250 horsepower (190 kW)
- Track gauge: 1,067 mm (3 ft 6 in)

The 1900 class railcars are a class of self-propelled railcars built by Commonwealth Engineering, Granville for the Queensland Railways in 1956.

== History ==
In 1956 two 1900 class railmotor prototypes were constructed by Commonwealth Engineering, Granville using Budd construction techniques. The railmotors suffered from continuous gearbox problems and Queensland Railways elected to purchase 2000 class rail motors instead.

RM1900 was stripped down for an overhaul in the mid 1980s but the work did not proceed and it was scrapped in August 1988.

RM1901 is retained by Queensland Rail as part of its Heritage Fleet. It is used for heritage tours and occasionally used for track inspections. When not required for use it is stored at the Workshops Rail Museum, North Ipswich.

== Gallery ==
1900 class rail motor
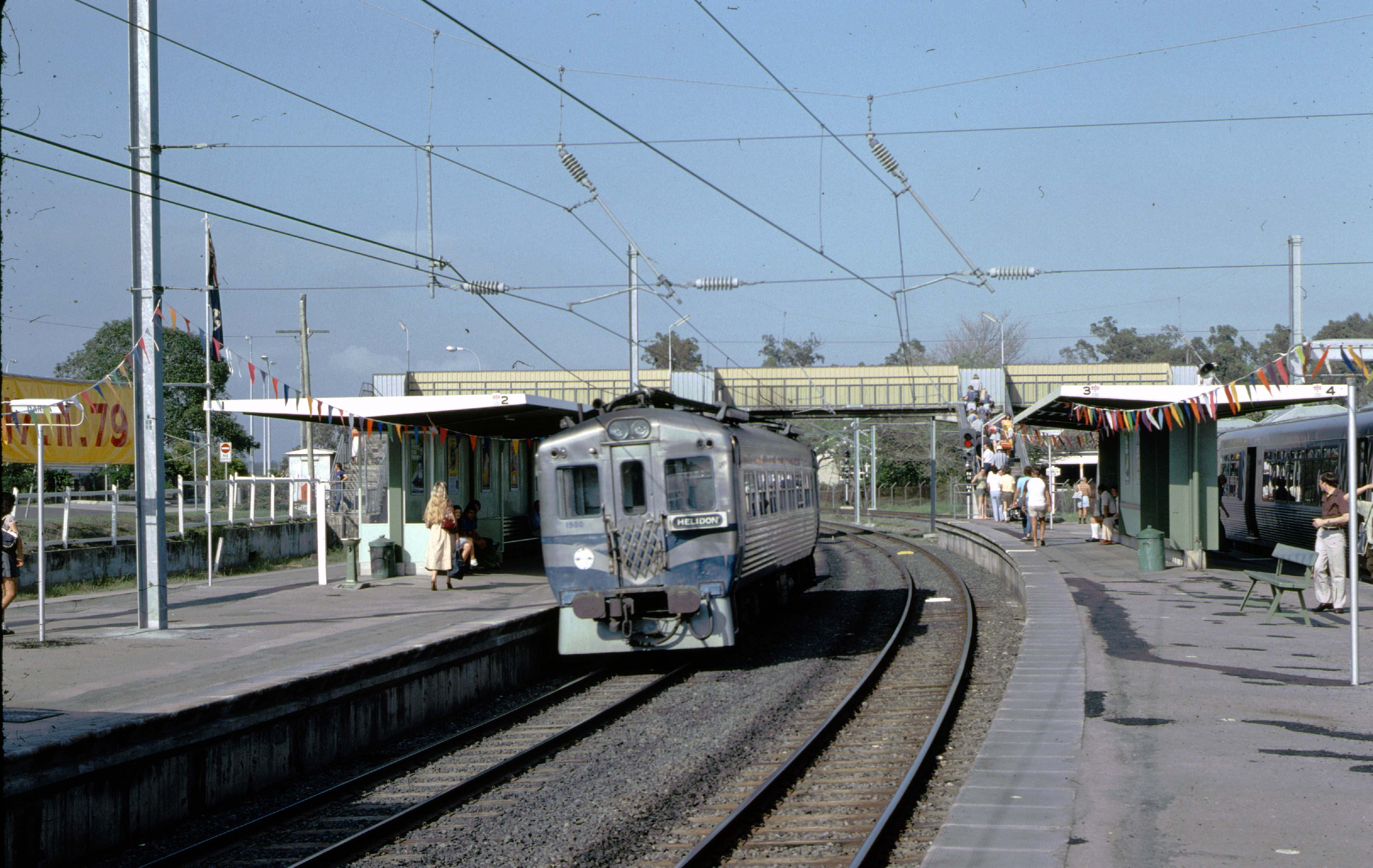
1900 at Darra in November 1979
