= North Coast line, Queensland chronological opening dates =

North Coast Line (NCL) opening dates chronologically

== NCL opening dates ==
This is a list of the NCL opening dates in chronological order. This list shows the known opening dates for all line construction, including deviations, plus the known dates of other significant NCL related events.

- 20 Dec 1880 Townsville-Stuart opens
- 6 Aug 1881 Maryborough-Gympie opens
- 11 May 1882 Roma Street-Sandgate (via Normanby) opens
- 30 Mar 1883 Baddow-Howard opens
- 1 April 1886 First section of duplicated track in Queensland, Albion-Eagle Junction, opens
- 22 Dec 1886 Mayne-Albion duplication opened
- 15 Aug 1887 Howard-Goodwood opens
- 20 Feb 1888 Goodwood-Bundaberg opens, links Bundaberg to Maryborough and Gympie
- 11 June 1888 Petrie-Caboolture opens
- 10 June 1889 Gympie-Cooran opens
- 18 Aug 1889 Roma Street-Central opens, first section in Queensland constructed as dual track
- 1 Feb 1890 Caboolture-Landsborough opens
- 1 May 1890 Bowen-Guthalungra opens, creating the 11th isolated system
- 17 Aug 1890 Eagle Junction-Northgate duplication opens
- 1 Nov 1890 Central-Mayne opens as dual track, completing the 'City Railway'
- 1 Jan 1891 Landsborough-Yandina opens
- 1 April 1891 Cooran-Cooroy opens
- 15 June 1891 Bundaberg-North Bundaberg, over Burnett River opens, links Mount Perry line to North Coast line
- 17 July 1891 Yandina-Cooroy opens, links Bundaberg, Maryborough and Gympie to Brisbane, Chrleville and Wallangarra
- 1 Oct 1891 Guthalungra-Bobawaba opens
- 1 July 1892 North Bundaberg-Rosedale opens
- 1 Aug 1896 Gladstone-Iveragh opens
- 1 Oct 1897 Rosedale-Iveragh opens, links Gladstone to Bundaberg and Brisbane
- 1897 Cairns-Gordonvale opens as Cairns Shire Tramway
- 1898 Steamer service between Gladstone-Rockhampton and Gladstone-Mackay-Townsville commenced
- 6 Nov 1899 Rockhampton-North Rockhampton over Fitzroy River opens as dual track, links Emu Park and Broadmount to Rockhampton and Longreach
- 1901 Stuart-Ayr tramway opened by Ayr Tramway Joint Board (ATJB)
- 1903 Bowen-Bobawaba line closed as public railway, leased to Bowen abattoir
- 18 Dec 1903 Gladstone-Rockhampton opens, links Longreach, Springsure and Clermont to Brisbane and beyond
- 1904 QR resumes operation of Bowen-Bobawaba line as a public railway
- 1910 Gordonvale-Babinda tramway opens
- 1910 Don (Bowen)-Proserpine tramway opened by Bowen Proserpine Joint Tramway Board (BPJTB)
- 1 Jan 1911 Stuart-Ayr Tramway purchased from ATJB by Queensland Railways
- 1 July 1911 Cairns-Babinda Tramway purchased from Cairns Shire Council by Queensland Railways
- 18 Oct 1911 Glenmore Junction (North Rockhampton)-Milman opens
- 9 Dec 1912 Babinda-Pawngilly opens
- 30 June 1913 Ayr-Carstairs opens
- 1 July 1913 Paget-Sarina opens
- 3 July 1913 Bobawaba-Home Hill opens
- 1 Sept 1913 Home Hill-Carstairs, including low level Burdekin Bridge opens, links Bowen to Townsville
- 1 Oct 1913 Milman-Yaamba opens
- 14 April 1914 Townsville-Kurukan opens
- 5 April 1915 Kurukan-Rollingstone opens
- 20 July 1915 Sarina-Koumala opens
- 3 Aug 1915 Yaamba-Kunwarara opens
- 1917 Duplication to Caboolture completed
- 31 March 1917 Kunwarara-Marlborough opens
- 2 May 1917 Rollingstone-Moongobulla opens
- 1 July 1917 Don-Proserpine purchased from BPJTB by Queensland Railways
- 19 April 1918 Mackay-Farleigh opens
- 29 July 1918 Moongobulla-Coolbie opens
- 26 Dec 1918 Coolbie-Bambaroo opens
- 5 June 1919 Marlborough-Styx opens
- 21 July 1919 Bambaroo-Toobanna opens
- 13 Sept 1919 Daradgee-Pawngilly opens
- 1 Dec 1919 Toobana-Ingham opens
- 9 August 1920 Styx-Wumalgi opens
- 10 Aug 1920 Koumala-Carmila opens
- 10 Jan 1921 Ingham-Lily Pond opens
- 4 June 1921 Wumalgi-St Lawrence opens
- 24 Sept 1921 St Lawrence-Carmila opens, linking Mackay to Rockhampton and beyond
- 1 March 1922 Gargett-Pakula opened
- 28 Aug 1922 Pakula-Owens Creek opened
- 18 Dec 1922 Innisfail-El Arish opens
- 1 Dec 1923 Farleigh-Proserpine opens, linking Townsville and Ingham with Mackay and beyond
- 3 Dec 1923 El Arish-Feluga opens
- 10 Dec 1924 Lily Pond-Feluga, Innisfail-Daradgee opens, linking Cairns to Townsville and rest of Queensland Railways system
- 1936 Townsville-Stuart duplication opens
- 1957 Burdekin High level bridge opens
- 1963 Stuart-Nome duplication opens
- 17 Nov 1979 Roma Street-Bowen Hills (via Central) section electrified
- 1979 Brunswick Street-Northgate third line completed
- 24 Nov 1980 Midgee-Rocklands-Gracemere opens
- 3 March 1982 Roma Street-Bowen Hills (via Normanby) section electrified
- 18 Sep 1982 Bowen Hills-Northgate electrified
- 23 April 1983 Northgate-Petrie electrified
- 26 May 1986 Rocklands-Port Curtis Junction opens, Gracemere-Port Curtis Junction and Midgee-Port Curtis Junction sections closed
- 28 June 1986 Petrie-Caboolture electrified
- 6 Sept 1986 Gladstone-Rockhampton electrification commissioned
- 28 April 1988 Caboolture-Nambour electrification commissioned
- 23 May 1988 Maryborough bypass opens
- 9 Dec 1988 Gympie bypass opens
- 4 Feb 1989 Nambour-Gympie North electrification commissioned
- 1989 Gympie North-Gladstone electrification commissioned
- 2 May 1993 Mackay realignment opens
- 1 Sep 1993 Bowen realignment opens
- 1995 Gladstone-Rocklands duplication completed
- 2009 Caboolture-Beerburrum duplicated

== By section ==
This is a list of the NCL opening dates in sectional order. This list shows the original opening date of each NCL section, ignoring any subsequent deviations etc.

Start	End	Date	Ref
Roma Street	Central	1889-08-18	
Central	Mayne	1890-11-01	
Mayne	Northgate	1882-05-11	
Northgate	Petrie (North Pine)	1888-03-01	
Petrie	Caboolture	1888-06-11	
Caboolture	Landsborough	1890-03-01	
Landsborough	Yandina	1891-01-01	
Yandina	Cooroy	1891-07-17	
Cooroy	Cooran	1891-04-01	
Cooran	Gympie	1889-06-10	
Gympie	Maryborough	1881-08-06	
Baddow	Howard	1883-03-30	
Howard	Goodwood (Gregory)	1887-08-15	
Goodwood	Bundaberg	1888-02-20	
Bundaberg	North Bundaberg	1891-06-15	
North Bundaberg	Rosedale	1892-07-01	
Rosedale	Iveragh (Eurimbla)	1897-10-01	
Iveragh	Gladstone	1896-08-01	
Gladstone	Rockhampton	1903-12-18	
Rockhampton	North Rockhampton	1899-11-06	
Glenmore Junction	Milman (Jardine)	1911-10-18	
Milman	Yaamba	1913-10-01	
Yaamba	Kunwarara	1915-08-03	
Kunwarara	Marlborough	1917-03-31	
Marlborough	Styx	1919-06-05	
Styx	Wumalgi	1920-08-05	
Wumalgi	St Lawrence	1921-06-04	
St Lawrence	Carmila	1921-09-24	
Carmila	Koumala	1920-08-07	
Koumala	Sarina	1915-07-21	
Sarina	Mackay	1913-06-07	
Mackay	Farleigh	1918-04-19	
Farleigh	Proserpine	1923-12-01	
Proserpine	Bowen	1910-07-02 (by Bowen Proserpine Joint Tramway Board)	
Bowen	Guthalungra	1890-05-01	
Guthalungra	Bobawaba (Wangaratta)	1891-10-01	
Bobawaba	Home Hill	1913-07-03	
Home Hill	Carstairs	1913-09-01	
Carstairs	Ayr	1913-06-30	
Ayr	Stuart	1901-03-27 (by Ayr Joint Tramway Board)	
Stuart	Townsville	1880-12-20	
Townsville	Kurukan	1914-04-14	
Kurukan	Rollingstone	1915-04-05	
Rollingstone	Moongobulla	1917-05-02	
Moongobulla	Coolbie	1918-07-29	
Coolbie	Bambaroo	1918-12-26	
Bambaroo	Toobanna	1919-07-21	
Toobanna	Ingham	1919-12-01	
Ingham	Lilypond	1921-01-10	
Lilypond	Feluga	1924-12-10	
Feluga	El Arish	1923-12-03	
El Arish	Innisfail	1922-12-18	
Innisfail	Daradgee	1924-12-08	
Daradgee	Pawngilly	1919-09-13	
Pawngilly	Babinda	1912-12-09	
Babinda	Harvey Creek	1910-02 (by Cairns Shire Council, CSC)	
Harvey Creek	Aloomba	1903-06-12 (by CSC)	
Aloomba	Gordonvale	1898-08 (by CSC)	
Gordonvale	Cairns	1897-05-03 (by CSC)	
