= The Percy Group, Queensland =

The Percy Group
- Suburb
- Interactive map of The Percy Group
- Coordinates: 21.8238°S 149.8680°E
- Country: Australia
- State: Queensland
- LGA: Isaac Region

Government
  - State electorate: Mirani
  - Federal division: Capricornia

Area
  - Total: 24,161.4 km^{2} (9,328.8 sq mi)

Population
  - Total: 4 (2021 census)
  - Density: 0.000166/km^{2} (0.00043/sq mi)
- Time zone: UTC+10:00 (AEST)
- Postcode: 4707
Suburbs around The Percy Group
Koumala; Ilbilbie	Coral Sea	Coral Sea
Carmila; Clairview	The Percy Group	Coral Sea
St Lawrence; Ogmore	Stanage	Coral Sea

The Percy Group is an offshore locality consisting of a number of islands (including the Percy Isles) in the Coral Sea within the Isaac Region, Queensland, Australia. The islands are mostly uninhabited as they are within national parks and conservation parks. In the 2021 census, The Percy Group had a population of 4 people.

== Geography ==
The locality is offshore east of Carmila and extends approx 325 kilometres (202 mi) into the Coral Sea. There are many small islands in the locality, most of which are in protected areas, including the following larger islands:

- Percy Isles National Park:
  - Pine Peak Island, 1.5 km^{2} (0.58 sq mi) (21.5191°S 150.2621°E).
  - Middle Island, 19.5 km^{2} (7.5 sq mi) ( 21.6567°S 150.2677°E)
  - North East Island, 2.5 km^{2} (0.97 sq mi) (21.6642°S 150.3382°E)
  - South Island, 12.7 km^{2} (4.9 sq mi) (21.7511°S 150.3323°E)
- Northumberland Islands National Park:
  - Curlew Island, 5.1 km^{2} (2.0 sq mi) (21.6028°S 149.8004°E
  - Tinonee Peak Island, 1.1 km^{2} (0.42 sq mi) (21.6553°S 149.8365°E)
- West Hill National Park:
  - West Hill Island, 4.0 km^{2} (1.5 sq mi) (21.8287°S 149.4862°E)
- Broad Sound Islands National Park:
  - Poynter Island, 1.0 km^{2} (0.39 sq mi) (21.8334°S 149.7986°E)
  - Aquila Island, 1.3 km^{2} (0.50 sq mi) (21.9818°S 149.5708°E)
- Swain Reefs National Park (21.98139°S 152.47306°E)
- Not in a national park:
  - Rosewood Island, 40.7 km^{2} (15.7 sq mi) (22.3990°S 149.7279°E)

== History ==
The locality takes its name from the Percy Isles within the Northumberland Islands, which in turn was named in September 1802 by Matthew Flinders, commander of the sloop HMS Investigator, after the family name of the Dukes of Northumberland.

== Demographics ==
In the 2016 census, The Percy Group had "no people or a very low population".

In the 2021 census, The Percy Group had a population of 4 people.

== Education ==
There are no schools in The Percy Group, nor nearby. The alternatives are distance education and boarding school.
