= Broad Sound Islands National Park =

National park in Australia

- IUCN category II (national park)
- Location within Queensland
- Location: Queensland
- Coordinates: 21°48′49″S 149°47′14″E
- Area: 16 km^{2} (6.2 sq mi)
- Governing body: Queensland Parks and Wildlife Service

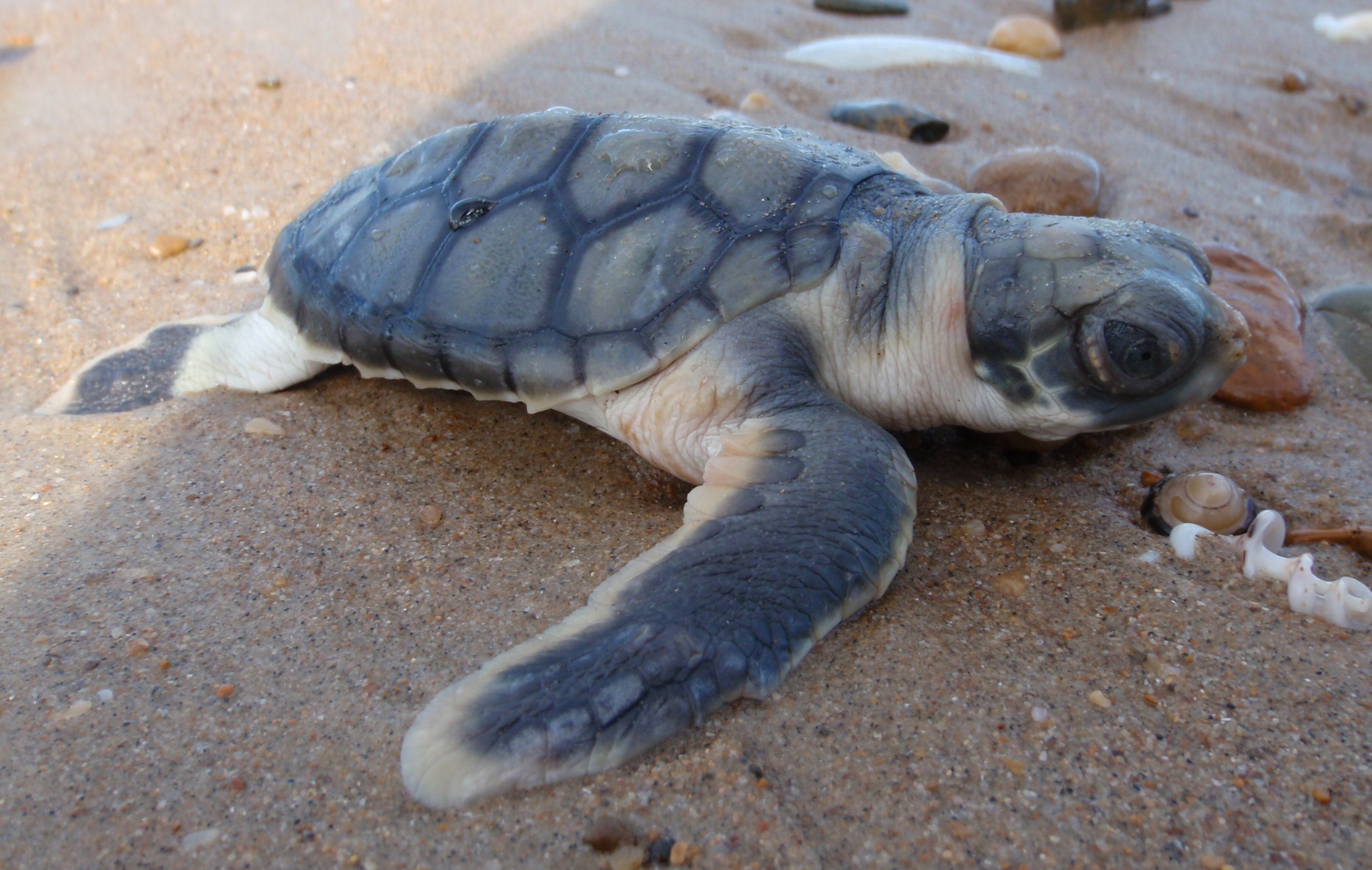
A flatback turtle hatchling going towards the sea.

Broad Sound Islands National Park, also known as Broad Sounds Islands, is a national park in Shire of Livingstone, Queensland, Australia, 709 km (441 mi) northwest of Brisbane. Estimated average altitude is 59 m (194 ft) above sea level.

The park covers 48 islands from Flock Pigeon Island (near Clairview on the mainland) through to High Peak Island (the furthest from any port). Four of the islands are officially known as Broad Sound Islands (Long, Tern, Quail and Wild Duck Islands), while many others form part of the larger island chain known as the Northumberland Islands.

Due to its remoteness and undisturbed nature, this park is a real paradise for nesting endangered species of flatback turtles.

The average summer temperature on the islands is 30 degrees, and the winter 23 degrees Celsius.

== See also ==
- Northumberland Islands National Park
- Protected areas of Queensland
