= Carmila Cane Lift =

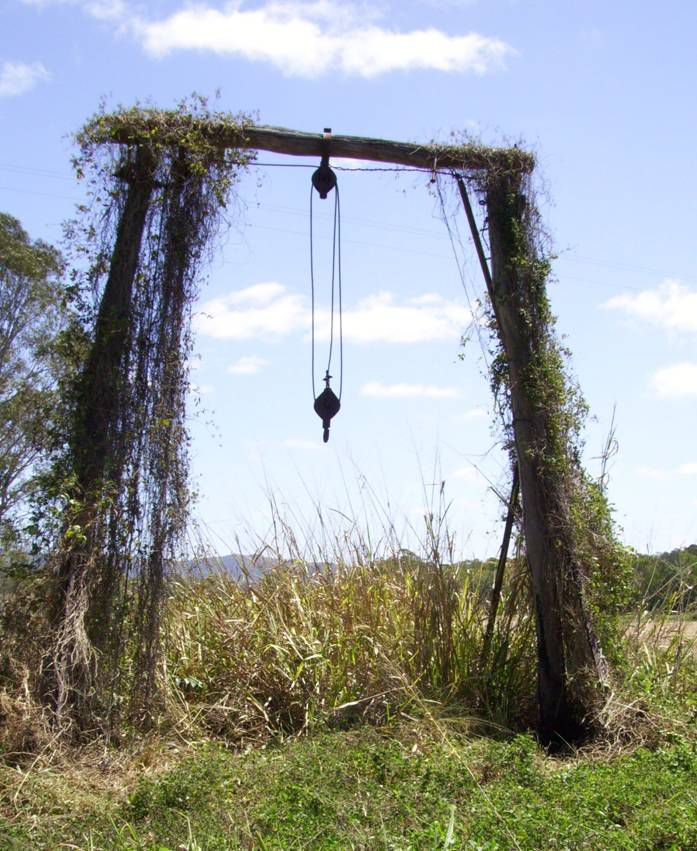
- Carmila Cane Lift

- Location within Queensland Location within Australia
- 21.9281°S 149.3682°E
- Location: 49 Hindles Road, Carmila, Isaac Region, Queensland, Australia

History
- Design period: 1940s - 1960s (post-World War II)
- Built: between 1920s to 1960s

Queensland Heritage Register
- Official name: Carmila Cane Lift
- Type: state heritage (built)
- Designated: 5 February 2010
- Reference no.: 602751
- Significant period: 1920s - 1960s

Carmila Cane Lift is a heritage-listed piece of agricultural equipment at 49 Hindles Road, Carmila, Isaac Region, Queensland, Australia. It was built between the 1920s and the 1960s. It was added to the Queensland Heritage Register on 5 February 2010.

== History ==
The Carmila cane lift is situated to the west of Carmila south of the township of Sarina in the Broad Sound area. Sugar cane is a major crop in Queensland; the state produces almost all of the nation's sugar. The cane lifts formed part of the process of transporting bundled whole stalks of harvested sugar cane from the farms to the mill. They were rendered obsolete by the universal adoption of "chopper" harvesters from the 1960s.

Sugar cane was first introduced to Australia in 1788 with the arrival of the First Fleet. In 1821, Port Macquarie under the command of Captain Francis Allman became Australia's first cane-growing area. In Queensland, the successful cultivation of sugar cane was established in 1864 at Redland Bay by Captain Louis Hope who erected Queensland's first sugar-crushing mill on the banks of Hilliard's Creek (now Ormiston) about 25 kilometres (16 mi) south-east of Brisbane.

Cane growing was tried at Bowen in the Whitsunday Region in 1864 but continued there only until 1869, when it became clear that the climate was too dry. In the Pioneer Valley the first grower in the Mackay region was John Spiller. He arrived in Mackay in 1865 as a would-be squatter without capital but with cane brought from Java which he planted on the north bank of the Pioneer River. In June 1867 he produced the first sugar in the region.

The incipient cane growing industry was given impetus in 1864 with the enactment of the Sugar and Coffee Regulations, introduced by the government to encourage northern settlement. This enabled lessees to obtain plots of up to 1,280 acres (520 ha) at a reasonable cost. Spiller and John Crees selected two blocks that became the Pioneer Plantation and built a primitive mill. T H Fitzgerald began a commercial plantation, Alexandra, in 1866 and with J Ewen Davidson set up a steam-powered mill that produced 110 long tons (110 t) of sugar in 1868. With these facilities a sugar boom began: small growers brought their cane for crushing to the Alexandra mill and acreage under cane expanded rapidly. Cane growers pushed back the graziers and by 1870 five mills were established.

By 1872 Mackay mills produced 40 per cent of the total Queensland sugar production and 37 per cent of its rum. Seventeen mills were established along the Pioneer River before 1875, most in 1872 and 1873. Another 12 including Farleigh, Habana, Homebush, and Marian were established between 1881 and 1885, then North Eton and Racecourse in 1888, Plane Creek began at Sarina in 1896 and in 1906 Cattle Creek Mill at Finch Hatton started operations.

Where crops were near the main railway line, cut cane was transported from field to mill via rail wagons. However, in cases where the crops and mills were remote from the railway, many mills established extensive tram networks for transporting harvested cane. The railway and tram networks continue to be used together with road transport.

From at least as early as the 1890s, cane lifts at tram or railway sidings were used to transfer bundles of cane onto rail or tram wagons. Cane was initially harvested as whole stalks by hand and, later, by whole stalk mechanical harvesters. The cane was cut close to the ground and then the top foliage was cut off. It was transported to the mill as whole stalks. A frequent practise was to lay temporary tramlines into the field so that tram wagons could be loaded with cut cane close to where the harvesting took place. Where this practise was not followed, the cane was loaded onto a horse-drawn wagon or motorised vehicle. This was done by hand until the introduction of mechanised loaders in the mid-20th century. The wagon or vehicle transported the cane to the nearest siding where the bundles of cane were transferred onto a tram or rail wagon using the cane lifts.

Many lifts were on private property, others on railway land at sidings. In many cases sugar mills paid for the construction of the lifts and cane farmers repaid the money at a predetermined cost per ton of cane sent to the mill.

The lifts took different forms. F W Bolton, the manager of Farleigh Mill, is credited with introducing the "traverser" type by 1891. This consisted of an overhead travelling winch which traversed a horizontal beam supported by two posts. The cane was laid flat on a sling in a dray which was driven under the winch. The winch was used to hoist the bundle of cane which was traversed about 2 metres (6 ft 7 in) and lowered into a tramway wagon parked next to the dray. The lift was praised at the time for greatly reducing loading times and enabling the cane to be packed more densely. Apparently this type of lift was widely adopted but there are no known examples extant in the Mackay area.

A similar configuration, possibly a modification of the traverser type, comprised two posts supporting a horizontal beam with a fixed pulley. These were predominantly used with tram wagons. As with the traverser the tram track passed under the horizontal beam. The wagon or truck containing the cane stalks was driven along the tram tracks to a position beneath the horizontal beam. The bundle of cane was hoisted, then the truck was driven out and its position taken by the tram wagon into which the cane was then lowered.

A third or "derrick" type consisted of a load bearing boom fixed by a pivoting coupling to the bottom of a mast. It was held in a diagonal attitude to the mast by a hinged horizontal beam extending from the top of the mast to the end of the boom. The boom swung in an arc and the lifting hook was lowered from the end of the horizontal beam. Derrick type lifts were in use by 1893. They were used mostly to load cane into main line railway wagons.

Albert John Wellman Fudge, a carpenter, is credited by some with inventing the derrick type lift. Fudge was a British immigrant who moved to Mackay in the 1890s. It is claimed that Fudge built over one hundred cane lifts for most district mills. His work was said to have been carried on by Harry Penny until the introduction of chopper harvesters.

A variety of methods were used to power the hoist. It was common to use a horse hitched to a pole fixed to a rotating drum. This system was later adapted for use with a motor. From World War II, trucks were also used. Power was transferred via a set of rollers positioned in the ground so that they would engage with the wheels of the truck carrying the cane. These lifts were known as "Tracey" lifts.

The Carmila lift is a Tracey lift. It is configured in a similar way to a traverser type, comprising a horizontal beam supported by two posts. A pulley fitted to the horizontal beam is loosely held in place with a metal clamp and lengths of heavy wire. The rollers that form part of the lifting mechanism for this type of lift remain extant in the ground beneath the horizontal beam.

The lift is located on the route of the former Plane Creek Mill tramway (no longer extant). The Plane Creek Mill commenced operations in 1896 and the tramway at Carmila was present by the mid 1920s. Therefore, the lift dates to between the 1920s and the 1960s when cane lifts were no longer used.

Cane lifts became redundant after the widespread introduction of chopper mechanical harvesters. Mechanical harvesting was attempted with little real success from the late 19th century. The development of mechanical harvesters accelerated from World War II. The first harvesters cut the cane as whole stalks. This meant that the labour-intensive task of bundling whole cane stalks and loading them continued. From the early 1950s, mechanical loaders alleviated this problem to some extent.

The introduction of chopper harvesters solved the loading problem. These harvesters chop the cane stalks into short lengths or billets. The billets are ejected from the harvester directly into bins towed by motor vehicle alongside the harvester. The bins are towed to the rail siding where they are transferred onto tram or rail wagons. Alternatively, the billets are tipped into bins on the wagons. By the mid-1960s, chopper harvesters had almost completely superseded whole stalk harvesters. The extant cane lifts probably all predate this time and some could date to the late 19th century.

== Description ==
The Carmila cane lift is located on the southern side of the Carmila West Road, approximately 5 kilometres (3.1 mi) west-south-west of the township of Carmila. Carmila is located on the Bruce Highway 100 kilometres (62 mi) south of Mackay.

Standing between 7 and 9 metres (23 and 30 ft) high, the lift comprises two upright poles supporting a horizontal cross beam. The beam comprises an unfinished wooden log. The upright poles are covered with a climbing vine.

A pulley wheel is loosely fitted to the top of the cross beam with a metal clamp and lengths of heavy duty wire. Steel cable runs through the pulley wheel and a hook is suspended at the end of the cable. Set into the ground beneath the horizontal beam are two sets of roller mechanisms each set comprising two steel rollers and a steel cog. These project slightly from the ground.

The lift is located in an open grassy area containing some low scrub and a few trees.

== Heritage listing ==
Carmila Cane Lift was listed on the Queensland Heritage Register on 5 February 2010 having satisfied the following criteria.

The place is important in demonstrating the evolution or pattern of Queensland's history.

The Carmila cane lift, located near Sarina, is one of a group of lifts in the Mackay/Whitsunday region, one of Queensland's oldest and most productive sugar cane growing areas. Historically, sugar has been one of the State's most important agricultural commodities. The lifts are important in demonstrating the evolution of the industry in that they provide evidence of how harvested cane was transported before the introduction of mechanical chopper harvesters. Sugar cane was originally harvested and transported to mills as whole stalks. The lifts were used to hoist bundles of stalks into tram or train wagons. They became redundant after the universal adoption of chopper harvesters from the 1960s. The Carmila lift is located on the route of the former Plane Creek Mill tramway, established by the mid 1920s.

The place is important in demonstrating the principal characteristics of a particular class of cultural places.

The Carmila cane lift is important in demonstrating the principal characteristics of a Tracey lift. Cane lifts took two basic forms: a derrick with a swinging boom, and a horizontal beam supported by two upright posts. The Tracey lift took the latter form and was powered by a truck backed under the lift so its back wheels engaged with rollers set into the ground. The lift at Carmila is an intact example of this type and includes the roller mechanism, pulley with cable and a hook.
