= Carmila, Queensland =

Carmila
- Town
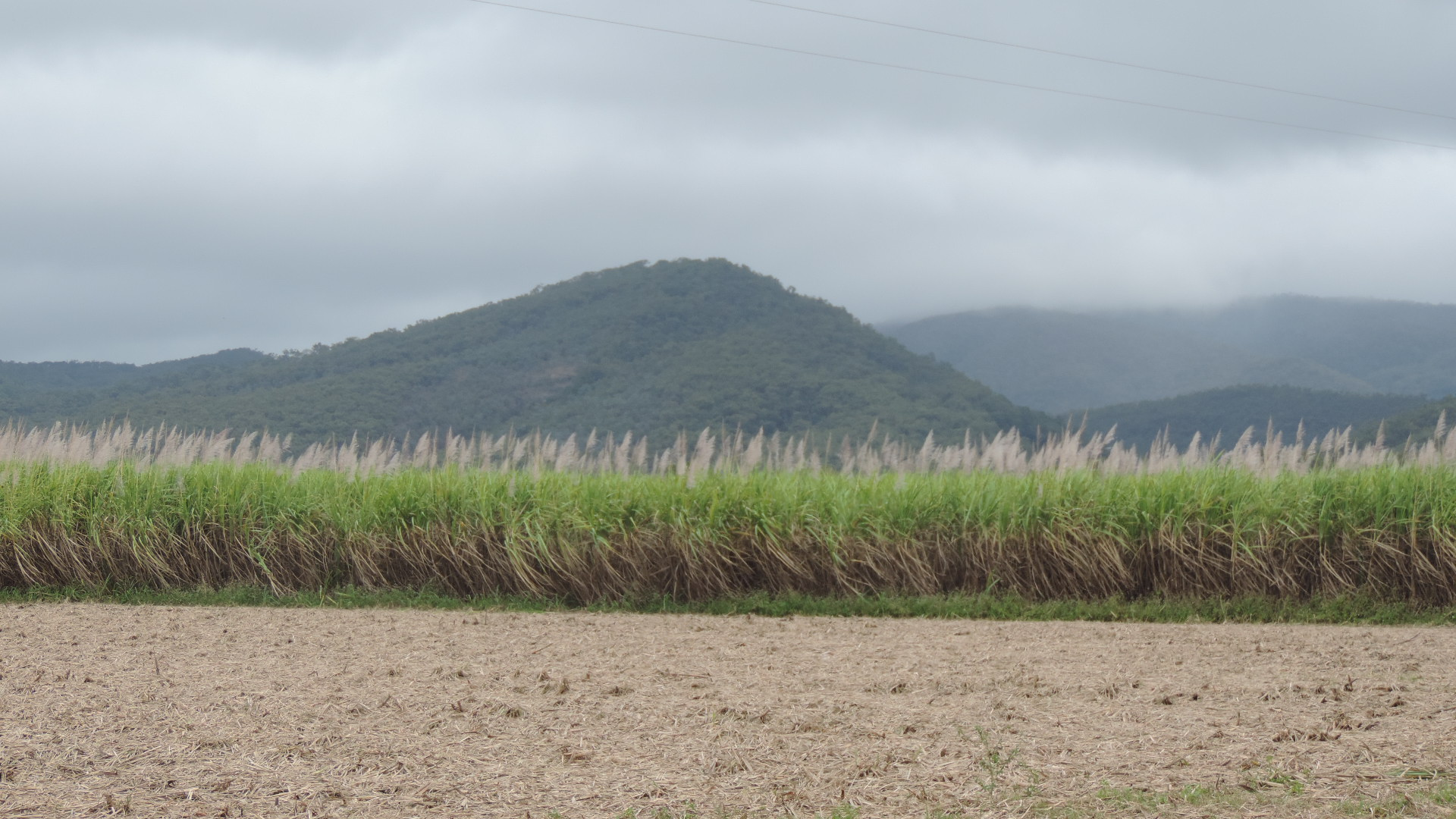
- View across sugar cane fields towards the mountains, Carmila, 2016

- Interactive map of Carmila
- Coordinates: 21.9116°S 149.4102°E
- Country: Australia
- State: Queensland
- LGA: Isaac Region
- Location: 72.2 km (44.9 mi) S of Sarina; 108 km (67 mi) S of Mackay; 213 km (132 mi) E of Moranbah; 861 km (535 mi) NNW of Brisbane

Government
  - State electorate: Mirani
  - Federal division: Capricornia

Area
  - Total: 452.0 km^{2} (174.5 sq mi)

Population
  - Total: 340 (2021 census)
  - Density: 0.752/km^{2} (1.948/sq mi)
- Time zone: UTC+10:00 (AEST)
- Postcode: 4739
Localities around Carmila
Ilbilbie	Ilbilbie	The Percy Group
Collaroy	Carmila	The Percy Group
Collaroy	Clairview	The Percy Group

Carmila is a rural town and coastal locality in the Isaac Region, Queensland, Australia. In the 2021 census, the locality of Carmila had a population of 340 people.

== Geography ==
Carmila is situated approximately 65 kilometres (40 mi) south of the town of Sarina.

Being a large locality, there are a number of neighbourhoods within the locality (from north to south):

- Westhill (21.8°S 149.3666°E)
- Tinerta (21.8833°S 149.4°E)
- Karloo (21.9°S 149.4166°E)
- Carmila West (21.9333°S 149.35°E)
- Flaggy Rock Creek (21.9666°S 149.45°E)
- Puzzle Pocket (21.9833°S 149.3666°E)

The North Coast railway line enters the locality from the south (Clairview), passes west of the town, and exits the locality to the north (Ilbilbie). The locality is served by a number of stops (from north to south):

- Westhill railway station, now abandoned (21.7990°S 149.3660°E)
- Orkabie railway station (21.8160°S 149.3720°E)
- Tinerta railway station, now abandoned (21.8757°S 149.3999°E)
- Karloo railway station, now abandoned (21.9014°S 149.4132°E)
- Carmila railway station, serving the town (21.9099°S 149.4156°E)
- Flaggy Rock railway station, now abandoned (21.9677°S 149.4454°E)

The Bruce Highway passes through the town as well. A large portion of the north west of Carmila belongs to the West Hill State Forest. Along the coast, the West Hill National Park was established in 1971. The major land uses are sugar cane farming and cattle grazing. Professional fishing occurs off the coast.

== History ==
Carmila State School opened on 9 July 1923.

Carmila Post Office opened by March 1924 (a receiving office had been open from 1894).

Carmila West State School opened on 18 August 1924 and closed on 31 December 1965.

West Hill Provisional School opened on 20 May 1925. In 1928, it became West Hill State School. It was mothballed on 31 December 2004 and closed on 24 August 2005. It was at 14 Red Hill Road (21.8099°S 149.3710°E). The school website was archived.

Carmila Police Station opened in 1933.

The Carmila Library opened in 1978.

== Demographics ==
In the 2011 census, the locality of Carmila and the surrounding area had a population of 398 people.

In the 2016 census, the locality of Carmila had a population of 333 people.

In the 2021 census, the locality of Carmila had a population of 340 people.

== Heritage listings ==
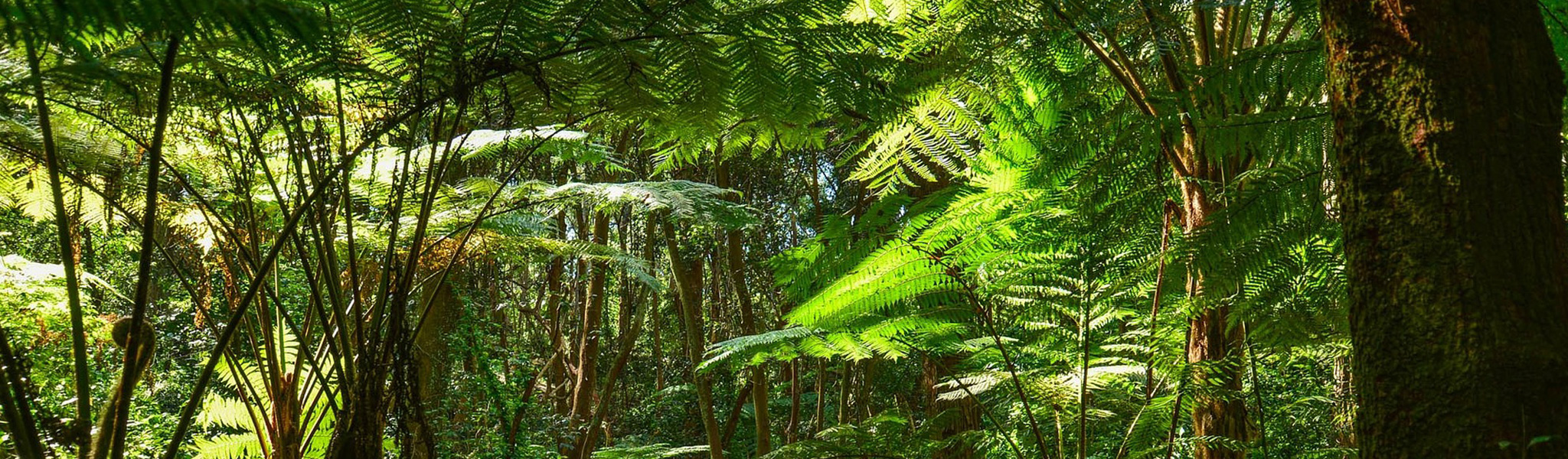
Carmila bushland, 2025

Carmila has a number of heritage-listed sites, including the Carmila Cane Lift at 49 Hindles Road (21.9281°S 149.3682°E).

== Education ==
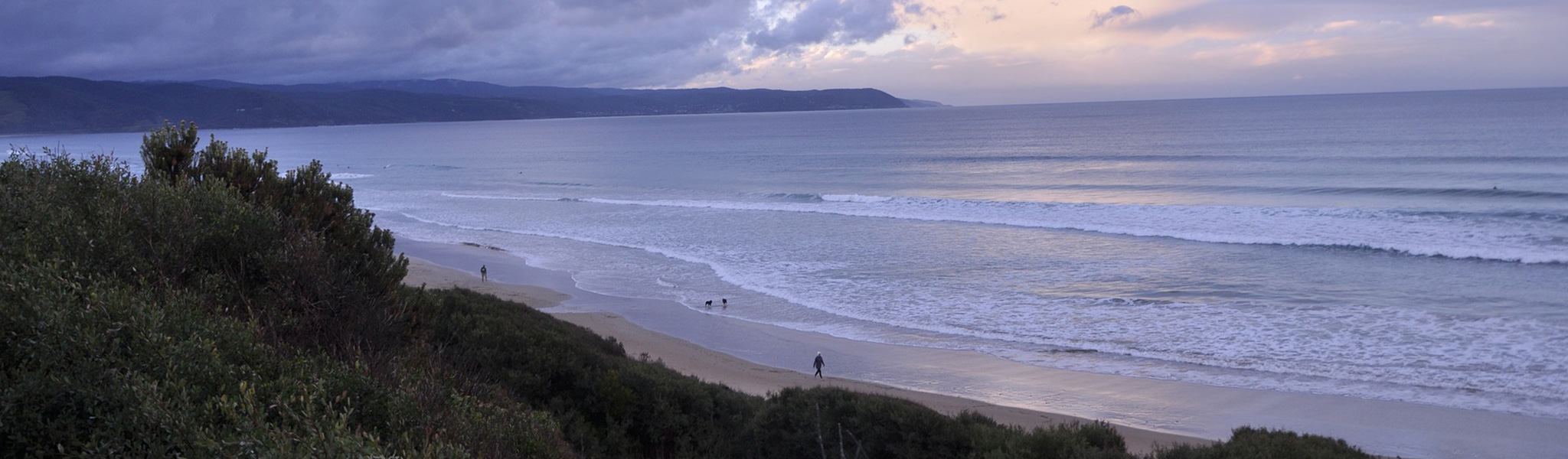
Carmila coastline, 2025

Carmila State School is a government primary (Prep-6) school for boys and girls at 6A Carmila West Road (21.9135°S 149.4035°E). In 2014, it had 32 students enrolled with 2 teachers (2 full-time equivalent). In 2018, the school had an enrolment of 16 students with 2 teachers and 5 non-teaching staff (3 full-time equivalent).

There are no secondary schools in Carmila. The nearest government secondary school is Sarina State High School in Sarina to the north.

== Amenities ==
The Isaac Regional Council operates a public library at 16 Music Street (21.9088°S 149.4114°E).

St Bartholomew's Anglican Church is at 5 Music Street (21.9084°S 149.4128°E). The Camila Uniting Church meets at the Anglican Church.

St Joseph's Catholic Church is at 12 Music Street (21.9088°S 149.4109°E).
