= Styx River (East Central Queensland) =

Styx
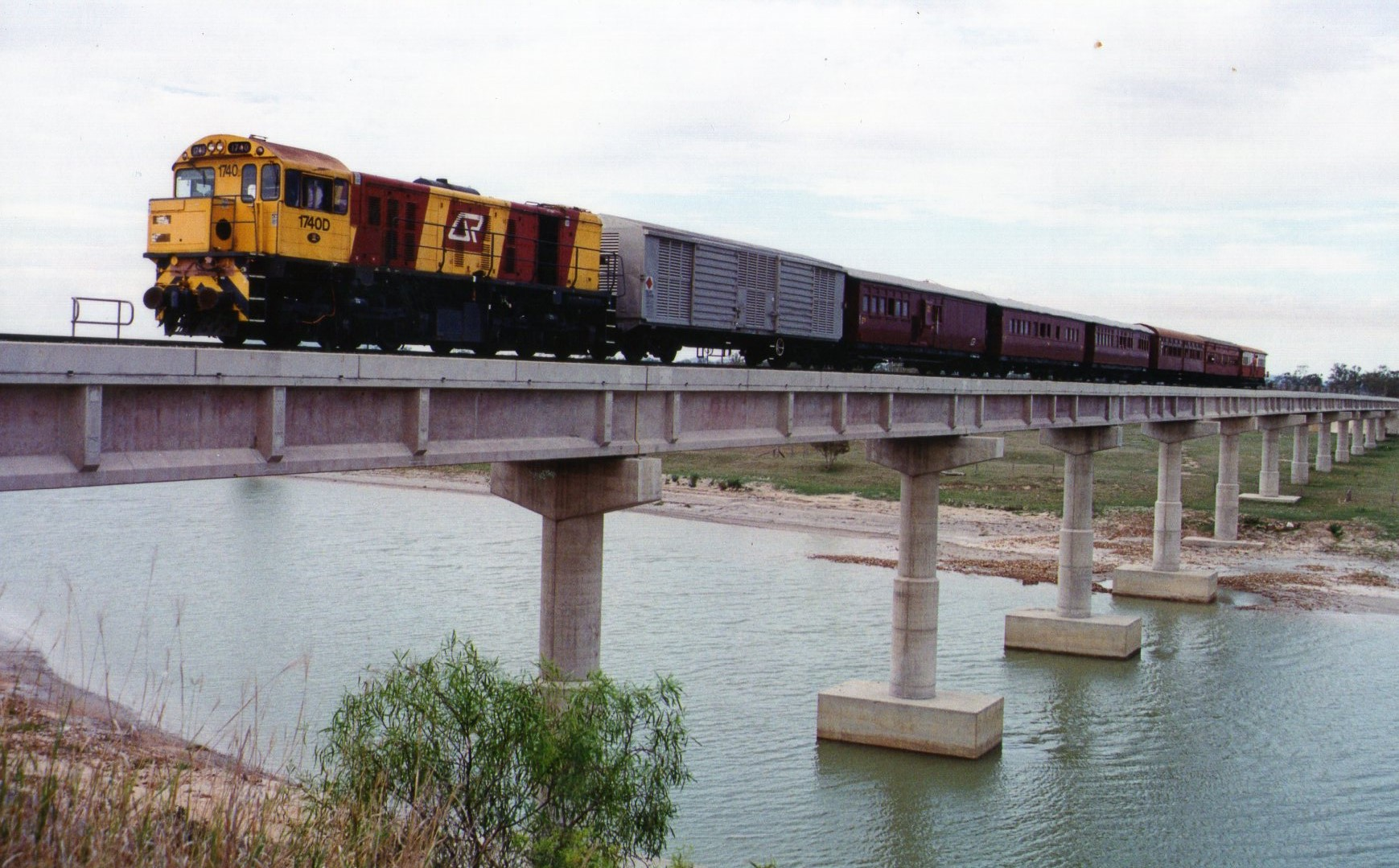
- Railway bridge over the Styx River

- Location of Styx River mouth in Queensland

Location
- Country: Australia
- State: Queensland
- Region: Central Queensland

Physical characteristics
- Source: Connors and Broadsound Range
  - elevation: 7 m (23 ft)
- Mouth: Broad Sound
  - location: Charon Point
  - coordinates: 22°21′39″S 149°47′55″E
  - elevation: 0 m (0 ft)
- Length: 33 km (21 mi)
- Basin size: 3,055 km^{2} (1,180 sq mi)

Basin features
- Conservation area: Charon Point Conservation Park

The Styx River is a river in the eastern portion of Central Queensland, Australia.

The river rises in the Connors and Broadsound Range and enters Broad Sound south of the Port of St Lawrence and to the north of the town of Ogmore. The river is crossed by both the Bruce Highway and North Coast railway line. From source to mouth, the river descends 7 metres (23 ft) over its 33-kilometre (21 mi) course.

The Styx River is wide at its mouth, resulting in a tidal bore at certain times. Much of the river valley remains natural leaving the water quality in a healthy state.

== See also ==
- List of rivers of Australia § Queensland
