= Ilbilbie, Queensland =

Ilbilbie
- Town
- Interactive map of Ilbilbie
- Coordinates: 21.7042°S 149.3571°E
- Country: Australia
- State: Queensland
- LGA: Isaac Region
- Location: 38.4 km (23.9 mi) SSE of Sarina; 75.0 km (46.6 mi) S of Mackay; 179 km (111 mi) ENE of Moranbah; 897 km (557 mi) NNW of Brisbane

Government
  - State electorate: Mirani
  - Federal division: Capricornia

Area
  - Total: 232.0 km^{2} (89.6 sq mi)

Population
  - Total: 385 (2021 census)
  - Density: 1.6595/km^{2} (4.298/sq mi)
- Time zone: UTC+10:00 (AEST)
- Postcode: 4738
Localities around Ilbilbie
| Koumala | Koumala | The Percy Group |
| Carmila | Ilbilbie | The Percy Group |
| Collaroy | Carmila | The Percy Group |

Ilbilbie is a rural town and coastal locality in the Isaac Region, Queensland, Australia. In the 2021 census, the locality of Ilbilbie had a population of 385 people.

The coastal town of Greenhill is on the eastern coast of the locality.

== Geography ==
The town of Ilbilbie is located in the centre of the locality. However, the larger town of Greenhill is located on the coast of the locality (21.6823°S 149.4521°E).

The Bruce Highway passes through the locality from south to north passing through the town of Ilbilbie. The North Coast railway line passes through the locality from south to north, very close to the highway. The Ilbilbie railway station serves the town (21.7035°S 149.3557°E). The Koota railway station to the south of the town (21.7213°S 149.3596°E) is now abandoned.

The land to the east of the highway and railway line is close to the coast and is low-lying land mostly used to grow sugarcane. There is a sugarcane tramway through this area.

The land to the west of the highway and railway is more mountainous, rising to 430 metres at Bulls Head Bluff. The West Hill State Forest is in the far west of the locality.

== History ==
The town takes its name from a pastoral property named in 1909, being an Aboriginal word meaning plain land, clear of timber. It was previously known as Basin Creek.

Ilbilbie Provisional School opened on 14 February 1922 but closed 11 days later due to low student numbers. It reopened on 6 May 1930 as Ilbilbie State School. It finally closed on 14 March 1960. It was at approx 87133 Bruce Highway (21.7151°S 149.3628°E).

== Demographics ==
In the 2016 census, the locality of Ilbilbie had a population of 349 people.

In the 2021 census, the locality of Ilbilbie had a population of 385 people.

== Economy ==
The Australian Prawn Farm operates in Ilbilbie and is capable of producing 600 tonne of black prawns (Penaeus monodon) per year.

== Education ==
There are no schools in Ilbilbie. The nearest government primary school is Koumala State School in neighbouring Koumala to the north-west. The nearest government secondary school is Sarina State High School in Sarina to the north.
