= Avoid Island =

Island in Queensland, Australia

- Location within Queensland Location within Australia

Geography
- Location: Coral Sea
- Coordinates: 21°58′S 149°40′E
- Archipelago: Flat Isles
- Adjacent to: Pacific Ocean
- Area: 63 ha (160 acres)
- Highest elevation: 33 m (108 ft)

Administration
- Australia
- State: Queensland
- LGA: Isaac Region

Avoid Island is one of the Flat Isles, within the island chain called the Northumberland Islands, around 20 km (12 mi) off the eastern coast of Queensland, Australia, approximately 100 km (62 mi) south of Mackay. Owned and managed by the Queensland Trust for Nature (QTFN) since 2006, the island is the only privately owned permanent nature refuge in the southern Great Barrier Reef, and is an important breeding location for the vulnerable flatback turtle.

== History ==
It is thought that either Captain James Cook or Matthew Flinders named the island, based on the level of difficulty for sailors, being tough to navigate around the nearby sandbars. Aboriginal use is not known specifically for Avoid Island, but it is known that Aboriginal people came in bark canoes around the Flat Isles and fished for various forms of marine life. It was then purchased by a family who used it for farming in 1933, at which time there was a freshwater swamp, which was used by freshwater turtles. In the 1970s, the island was used for growing drug crops, before being acquired by the Queensland Government as proceeds of crime.

QTFN purchased the island in 2006 in order to turn it into a nature refuge.

== Geography ==
Avoid island is one of the group known as the Flat Isles, within the larger group called the Northumberland Islands. It lies 20 km (12 mi) off the eastern coast of Queensland, approximately 100 km (62 mi) south of Mackay.

As the name would suggest, the Flat Isles are low islands, with Avoid Island having the highest elevation at around 33 m (108 ft) above sea level. The island's area is 63 ha (160 acres), around 1 km (0.62 mi) wide, and is covered with low tropical vegetation and mangroves. It is in the Isaac Region local government area.

== Ecology, flora and fauna ==
It lies in the Proserpine-Sarina Lowlands subregion of the IBRA interim bioregion of the Central Mackay Coast, and within the Great Barrier Reef Marine Park.

The island has great importance as a breeding ground for the vulnerable flatback turtle, which is only found in the reef waters. Crocodiles and death adders (also a vulnerable species) also live on the island, and at least 84 species of birds visit it, including the critically endangered eastern curlew. There are no introduced pests, but there are weeds.

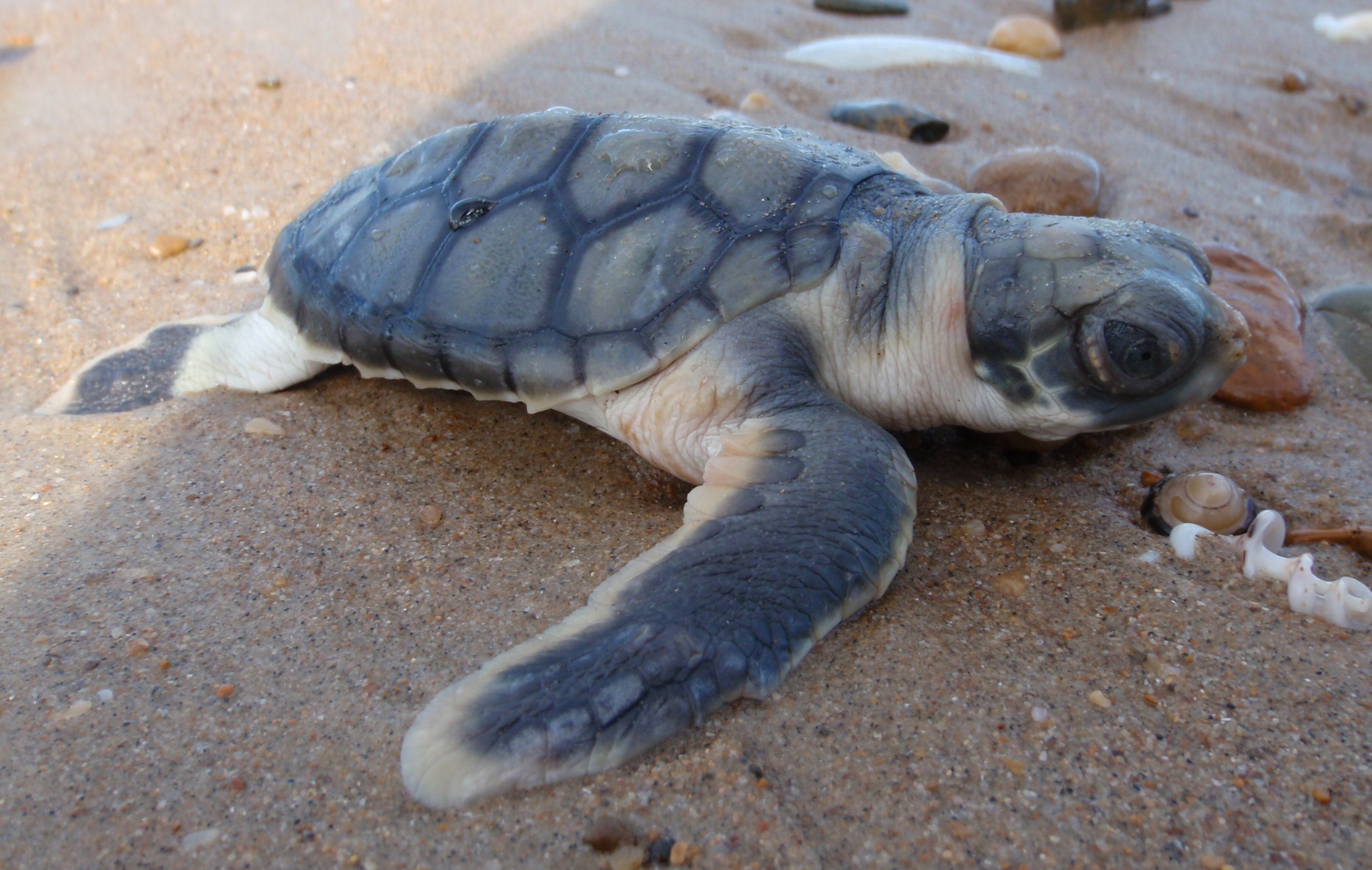
A flatback sea turtle hatchling. Avoid Island is an important breeding sanctuary for the vulnerable species.

== Conservation efforts ==
Avoid Island is only privately owned permanent nature refuge in the southern Great Barrier Reef, and is mainly concerned with protecting the habitat of flatback turtles.

The turtles have been monitored since the February 2013 hatching season, and Queensland's Department of Environment and Science collects the data as part of a longterm turtle-monitoring project. Around 70 turtle nests were observed in the 2022 hatching season.

A project to restore the habitat of flatback turtles was launched on 7 January 2014. This project, funded by a government grant of A$83,500, aimed to clean up marine debris from the sand dunes of three beaches on Avoid Island. A survey of nesting female turtles and hatchlings was planned in order to ascertain any change in breeding patterns and/or survival rates of the turtles.

Since 2021 the island is being restored by the Great Barrier Reef Foundation in partnership with QTFN, the Koinmerburra Aboriginal Corporation and other groups as a climate change refuge for the flatback turtle, a vulnerable species. Around 80 per cent of the turtle eggs laid on the island hatch, although numbers returning to nest are as low as one per cent.

Other organisations, including universities, come to the island and use QTFN facilities to study and research the turtles and other aspects of conservation. Biosecurity is taken very seriously, and visitors are carefully controlled, but there are volunteering opportunities to help with weed eradication. The island is protected as a nature refuge.
