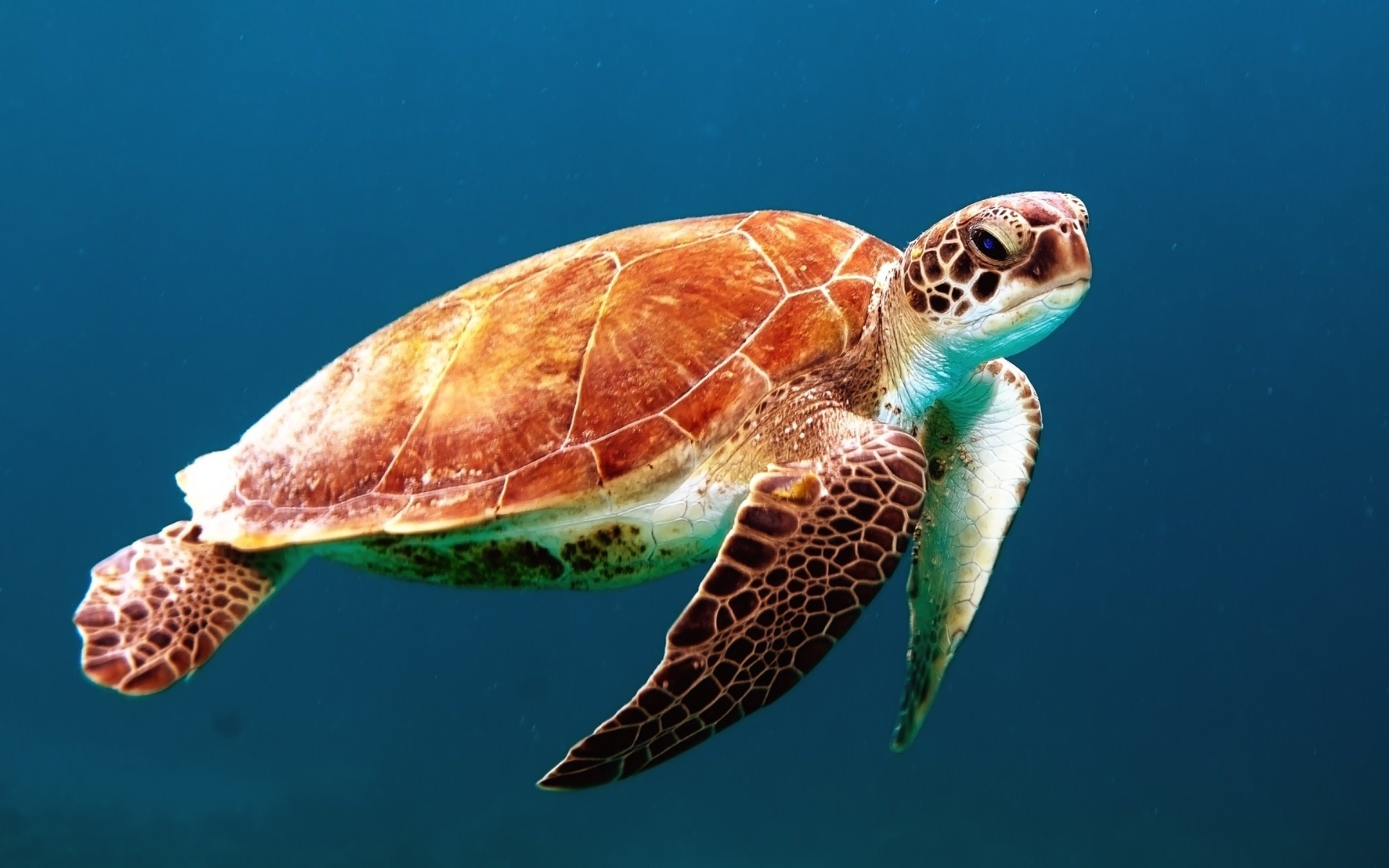
- Chelonia mydas

Scientific classification
- Kingdom: Animalia
- Phylum: Chordata
- Class: Reptilia
- Order: Testudines
- Suborder: Cryptodira
- Family: Cheloniidae
- Subfamily: Cheloniinae

Genera
- Chelonia; Natator

= Cheloniinae =

Cheloniinae Temporal range: Campanian–recent

Subfamily of turtles

Cheloniinae is a subfamily of the sea turtle family Cheloniidae.

The extant members of the subfamily, and genera that make it up, are:

Image	Genus	Species
	Chelonia Brongniart, 1800	Chelonia mydas (green sea turtle)
	Natator McCulloch, 1908	Natator depressus (flatback sea turtle)
