= Broad Sound (Queensland) =

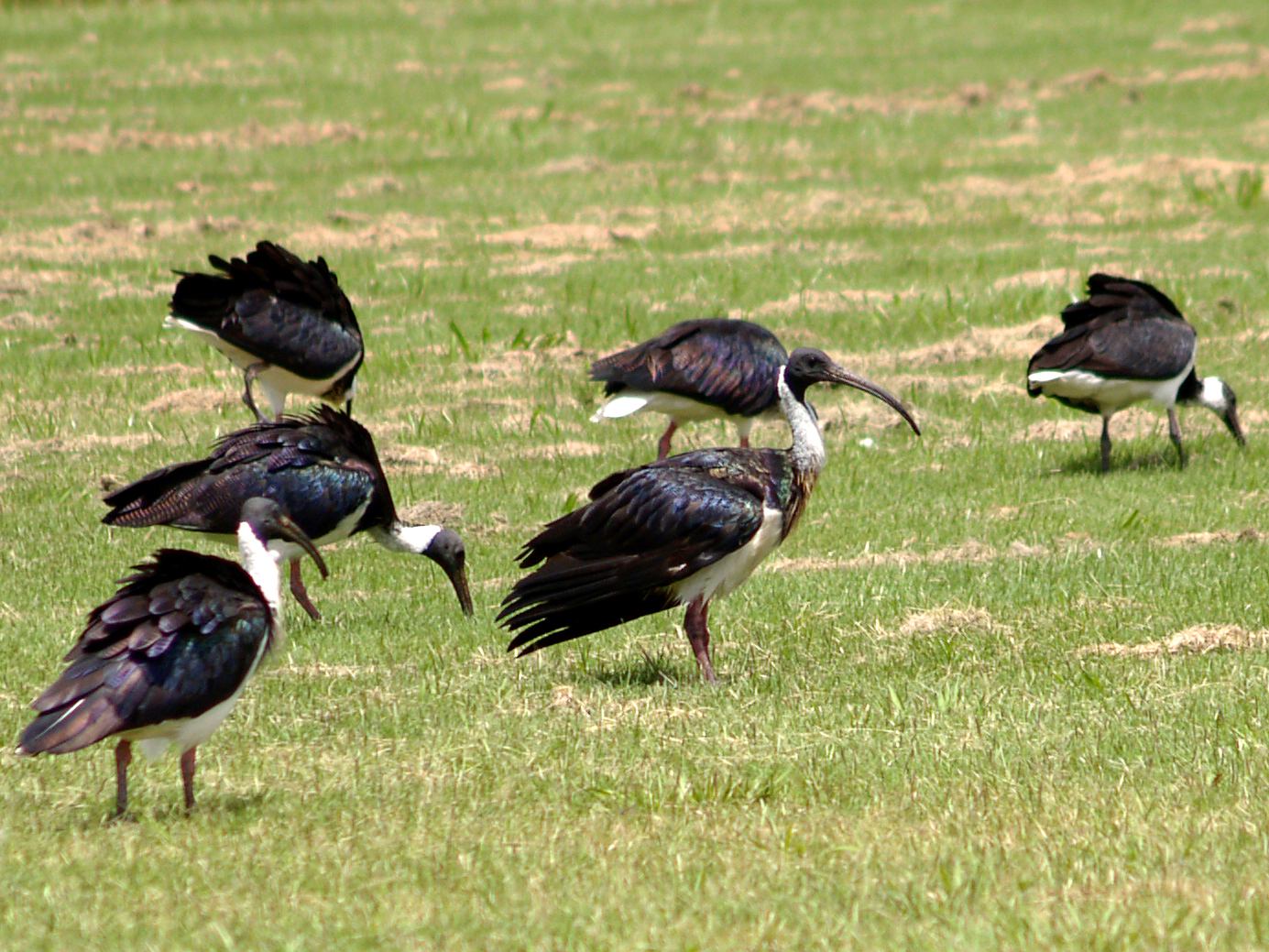
- Broad Sound is a globally important site for the straw-necked ibis

- Broad Sound
- Location: Central Queensland, Australia
- Coordinates: 22°09′S 149°45′E
- Type: sound
- Part of: Pacific Ocean
- Primary inflows: Styx River
- Basin countries: Australia
- Max. length: 50 kilometres (31 mi)
- Max. width: 20 kilometres (12 mi)

Broad Sound is a large bay on the east coast of Australia, in the state of Queensland, 675 kilometers (419 miles) northwest of the state capital, Brisbane. It is about 50 kilometers (31 miles) long and 20 kilometers (12 miles) across at its widest point. The Torilla Peninsula forms the eastern side of the bay; Shoalwater Bay is on the other side of the peninsula. The sound has a large tidal range of about 10 metres (33 ft). This is the largest variance on the eastern Australia coastline.

== History ==
British explorer James Cook, in HMS Endeavour, sighted the bay in May 1770, naming it for its size. The next European navigator in the area was Matthew Flinders in HMS Investigator in 1802.

The town of St Lawrence was established midway between Rockhampton and Mackay on St Lawrence Creek and developed as a port for the export of cattle from the hinterland, with a large meatworks built close by in 1893. The processing and export of meat and cattle continued until 1919 when rail links were built elsewhere, making the port redundant. By 2006 the population of St Lawrence had dropped to 125, out of a population in the Broad Sound area of 268.

== Description ==
Broad Sound is 50 kilometres in length and 20 kilometres wide. The bay has a low-lying coastline with wide mudflats exposed at low tide and backed by extensive areas of mangroves. The head of the bay has the greatest tidal range on Australia's east coast - around 9 meters (30 feet). The coastline is punctuated by the mangrove-lined estuaries of several rivers and creeks, including Herbert and St Lawrence Creeks and the Styx River. Behind the mangroves is a hinterland of low, rounded hills covered by a mix of grassland and low eucalypt woodland or forest. The climate is subtropical with a dry winter.

Parts of the sound and adjoining estuarine systems are in a Declared Fish Habitat Area, the states largest such area.

== Birds ==
The extensive tracts of mangroves and mudflats, comprising some 1,200 square kilometers (460 square miles) in the southern part of the bay, have been classified by BirdLife International as an Important Bird Area. It supports globally important populations of the straw-necked ibis (with up to 15,000 individual birds), Australian bustard, Latham's snipe, sharp-tailed sandpiper and mangrove honeyeater.

== See also ==
- Broad Sound Islands
- Broad Sound Islands National Park
- List of sounds
