= Carmila railway station =

Railway station in Queensland, Australia

Carmila
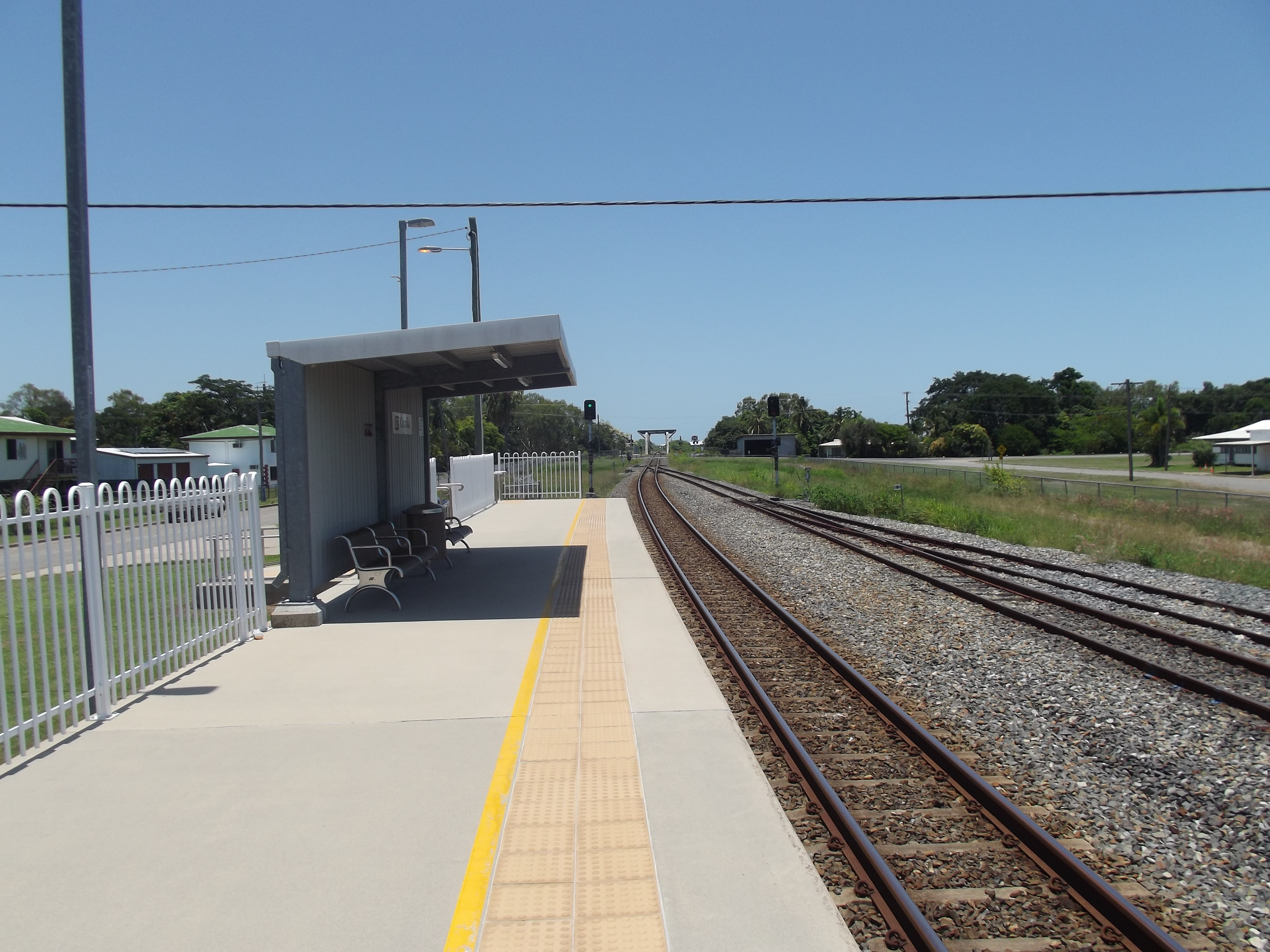
- Northbound view in January 2013

General information
- Location: Railway Parade, Carmila
- Coordinates: 21°54′36″S 149°24′56″E
- Owner: Queensland Rail
- Operator: Traveltrain
- Line: North Coast
- Distance: 863.99 kilometres from Brisbane
- Platforms: 1
- Tracks: 3

Construction
- Structure type: Ground
- Accessible: Yes

Services
| Preceding station | Queensland Rail | Following station |
|---|---|---|
| St Lawrence towards Brisbane | Spirit of Queensland | Sarina towards Cairns |
Location

Carmila railway station is located on the North Coast line in Queensland, Australia. It serves the town of Carmila. Opposite the single platform lie a crossing loop and siding.

== Services ==
Carmila is served by Traveltrain's Spirit of Queensland service.
