= Sarina railway station =

Railway station in Queensland, Australia

Sarina
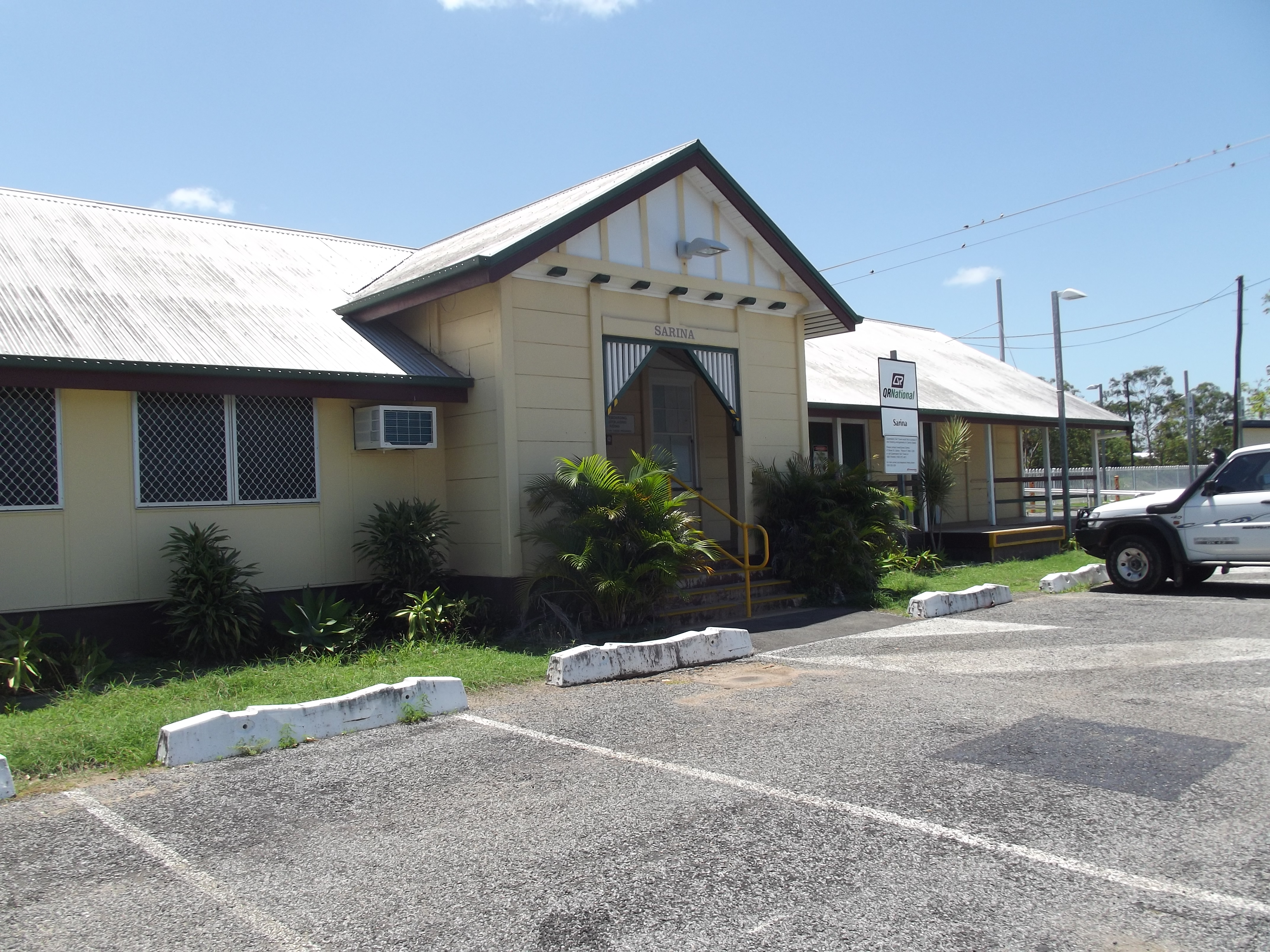
- Station front in January 2013

General information
- Location: Bruce Highway, Sarina
- Coordinates: 21.4260°S 149.2171°E
- Owner: Queensland Rail
- Operator: Traveltrain
- Line: North Coast
- Distance: 925.82 kilometres from Central
- Platforms: 1
- Tracks: 4

Construction
- Structure type: Ground
- Accessible: Yes

Services
Preceding station	Queensland Rail	Following station
Carmila towards Brisbane	Spirit of Queensland	Mackay towards Cairns
Location

Sarina railway station is located on the North Coast line in Queensland, Australia. It serves the town of Sarina. Opposite the single platform lies a crossing loop and sidings for CSR's Plane Creek Mill ethanol distillery.

== Services ==
Sarina is served by Traveltrain's Spirit of Queensland service.
