= West Hill National Park =

National park in Australia

- IUCN category II (national park)
- Location within Queensland
- Location: Queensland
- Coordinates: 21°49′49″S 149°29′10″E
- Area: 10.80 km^{2} (4.17 sq mi)
- Established: 1971
- Governing body: Queensland Parks and Wildlife Service

West Hill is a national park in Carmila, Isaac Region, Queensland, Australia.

== Geography ==
The park is 722 km (449 mi) northwest of Brisbane.

== See also ==
- Protected areas of Queensland
