= Clairview =

- Town
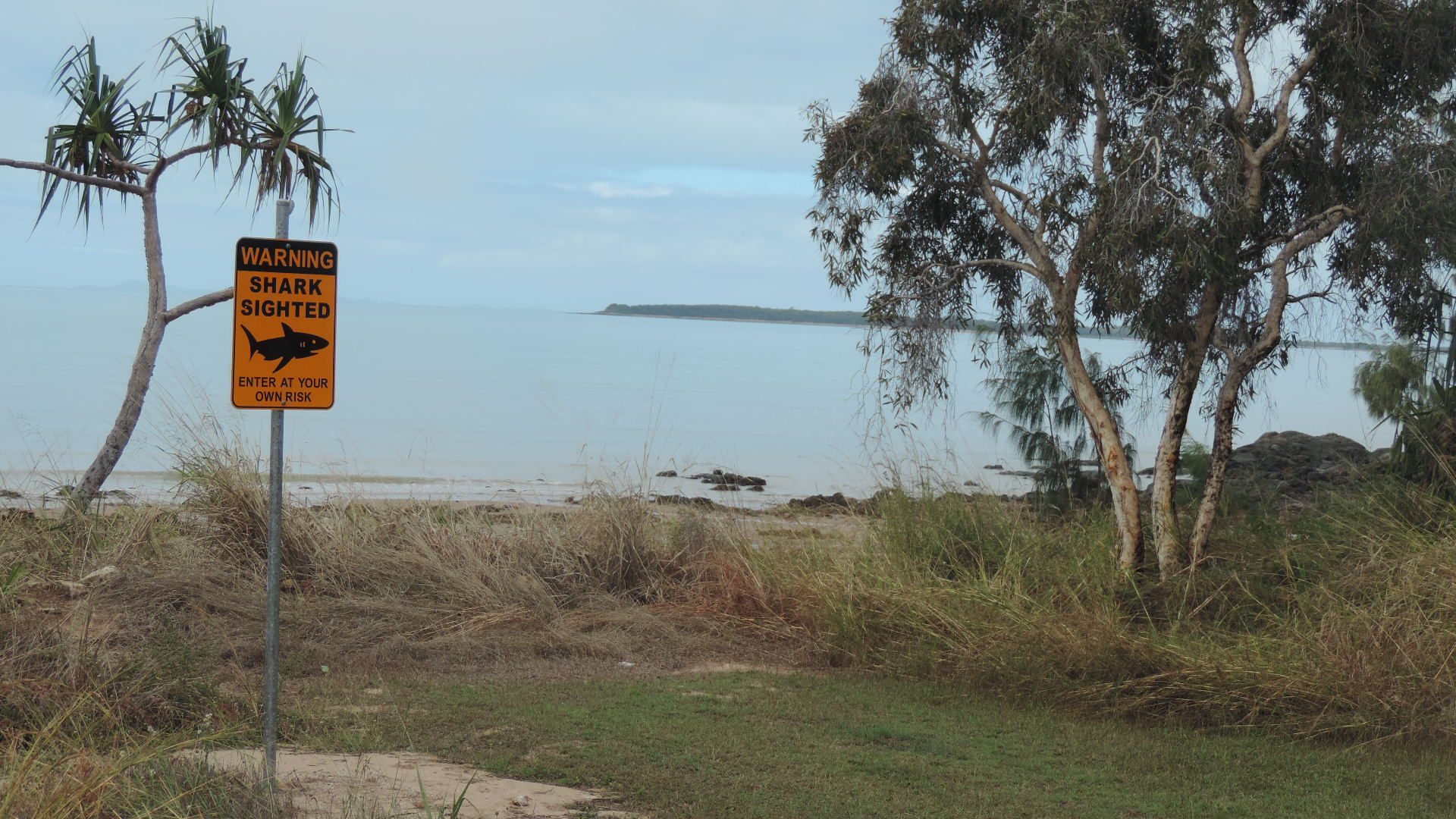
- Shark sighting sign on Clairview's beach, 2016

- Interactive map of Clairview
- Coordinates: 22.1175°S 149.5347°E
- Country: Australia
- State: Queensland
- LGA: Isaac Region
- Location: 81.5 km (50.6 mi) S of Sarina; 117 km (73 mi) S of Mackay; 222 km (138 mi) E of Moranbah; 837 km (520 mi) NNW of Brisbane

Government
  - State electorate: Mirani
  - Federal division: Capricornia

Area
  - Total: 174.3 km^{2} (67.3 sq mi)

Population
  - Total: 167 (2021 census)
  - Density: 0.9581/km^{2} (2.482/sq mi)
- Time zone: UTC+10:00 (AEST)
- Postcode: 4741
Localities around Clairview
Collaroy	Carmila	The Percy Group
Collaroy	Clairview	The Percy Group
Collaroy	St Lawrence	The Percy Group

Clairview is a coastal town and locality in the Isaac Region, Queensland, Australia. In the 2021 census, the locality of Clairview had a population of 167 people.

== Geography ==
The coastal strip along the east of the locality of Clairview is relatively flat (at or just above sea level), while most of the centre and western part of the locality is hilly, up to 500 meters (1,600 feet). The coastal flats are partially used for grazing, while the hillier land is undeveloped. Clairview has a natural sand beach along the coastline. The town of Clairview is in the south-eastern corner of the locality and consists of a strip of housing on the seafront.

The Bruce Highway (from Brisbane to Cairns) passes through Clairview from the south (the locality of St Lawrence) immediately beside the town of the Clairview and is one of the few places on this "coastal" highway where the sea is actually visible from the road. The highway then continues north on a more inland route into Carmila. The North Coast railway line (also from Brisbane to Cairns) runs just to the east of the highway in the southern town area and then continues north between the highway and the coast, with Elalie railway station (22.0448°S 149.4960°E) serving the locality.

In the northernmost part of the locality is the neighbourhood of Flaggy Rock (21°58′00″S 149°27′00″E), which is sandwiched between the highway to the west and the railway line to the east.

== History ==
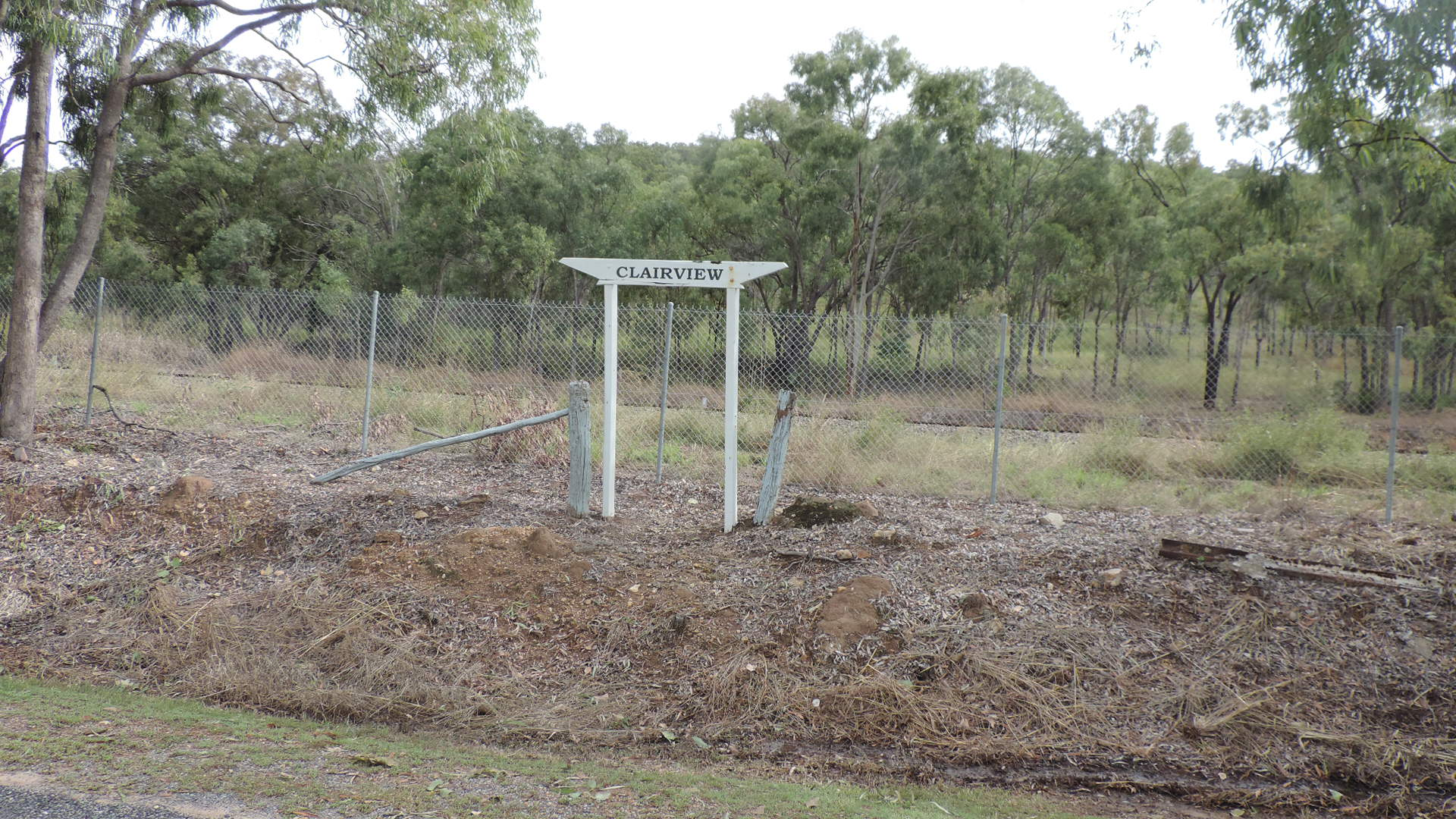
Remains of the former Clairview railway station on the North Coast railway line, 2016

Clairview takes its name from a former pastoral station operated by W. and M. Christian.

Clairview was served by the Clairview railway station (22.1199°S 149.5350°E), but it has been closed. From 20 November 1919, Flaggy Rock was served by Yokolgy or Yankolgy railway station, renamed Flaggy Rock railway station (21.9672°S 149.4449°E) on 4 November 1921 at the request of local residents. It has also closed.

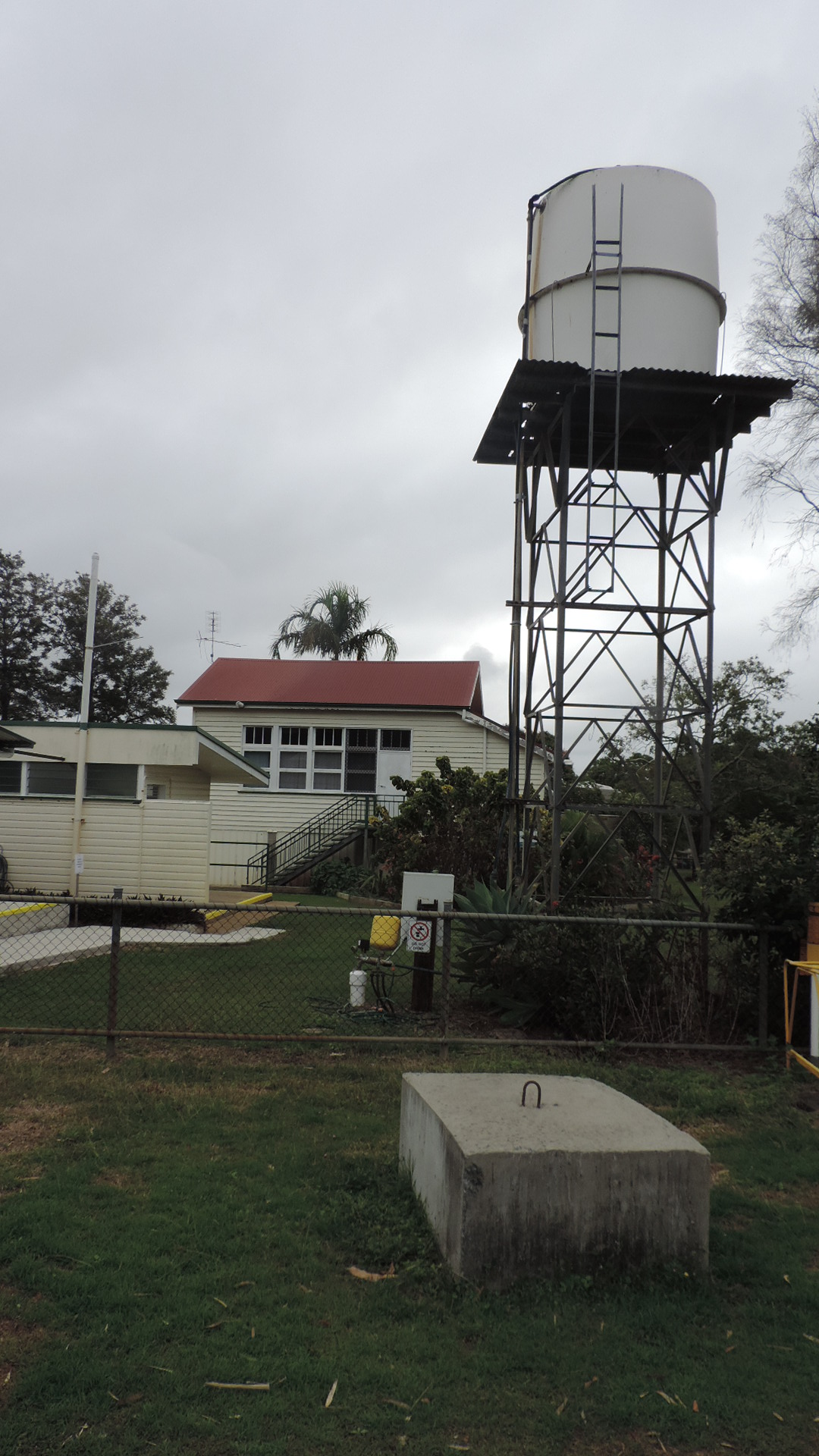
Former Flaggy Rock Creek State School, now Flaggy Rock Community Centre, 2016

On 11 October 1916, Rocky Dam State School was opened in Flaggy Rock. It was renamed Flaggy Rock Creek State School in 1920. It was at 85 Flaggy Rock Road (21.9682°S 149.4441°E). It closed on 13 December 1996. It is now used as Flaggy Rock Community Centre.

== Demographics ==
In the 2006 census, the locality of Clairview had a population of 75 people.

In the 2016 census, the locality of Clairview had a population of 145 people.

In the 2021 census, the locality of Clairview had a population of 167 people.

== Education ==
There are no schools in Clairview. The nearest government primary schools are Carmila State School in neighbouring Carmila to the north and St Lawrence State School in neighbouring St Lawrence to the south. The nearest government secondary school is Sarina State High School in Sarina to the north, but it is a considerable distance for a daily commute. Distance education and boarding schools are the alternatives.

== Attractions ==
Clairview is popular for fishing and catching mud crabs. The waters off Clairview are a protected area for the endangered dugong.

There is a caravan park and public park.

There is a boat ramp at Colonial Drive across Clairview Beach into the Coral Sea (22.1197°S 149.5362°E). It is managed by the Isaac Regional Council.
