= Rainer Zangerl =

Swiss paleontologist (1912-2004)

- Born: November 19, 1912; Winterthur, Switzerland
- Died: December 27, 2004 (aged 92)
- Education: University of Zurich
- Known for: Fossil sharks and turtles
- Awards: Romer–Simpson Medal (2003)
- Scientific career
- Fields: Paleontology
- Workplaces: Field Museum of Natural History
- Doctoral advisor: Bernhard Peyer

Rainer Zangerl (19 November 1912 – 27 December 2004) was a Swiss paleontologist who worked in the United States.

Zangerl earned his doctorate at the University of Zurich under Bernhard Peyer and moved to the United States in 1937. He served as curator of fossil reptiles at the Field Museum of Natural History in Chicago, where he also temporarily headed the Department of Geology.

Together with his colleague Eugene Richardson, he made important discoveries of fossil sharks in Parke County, Indiana, during the 1950s and 1960s. In addition to fossil sharks, another major focus of his work was fossil turtles.

In 2003, he was awarded the Romer–Simpson Medal by the Society of Vertebrate Paleontology, which he had co-founded and where he served as both honorary member and president.
