= Mackay railway station =

Railway station in Queensland, Australia

Mackay
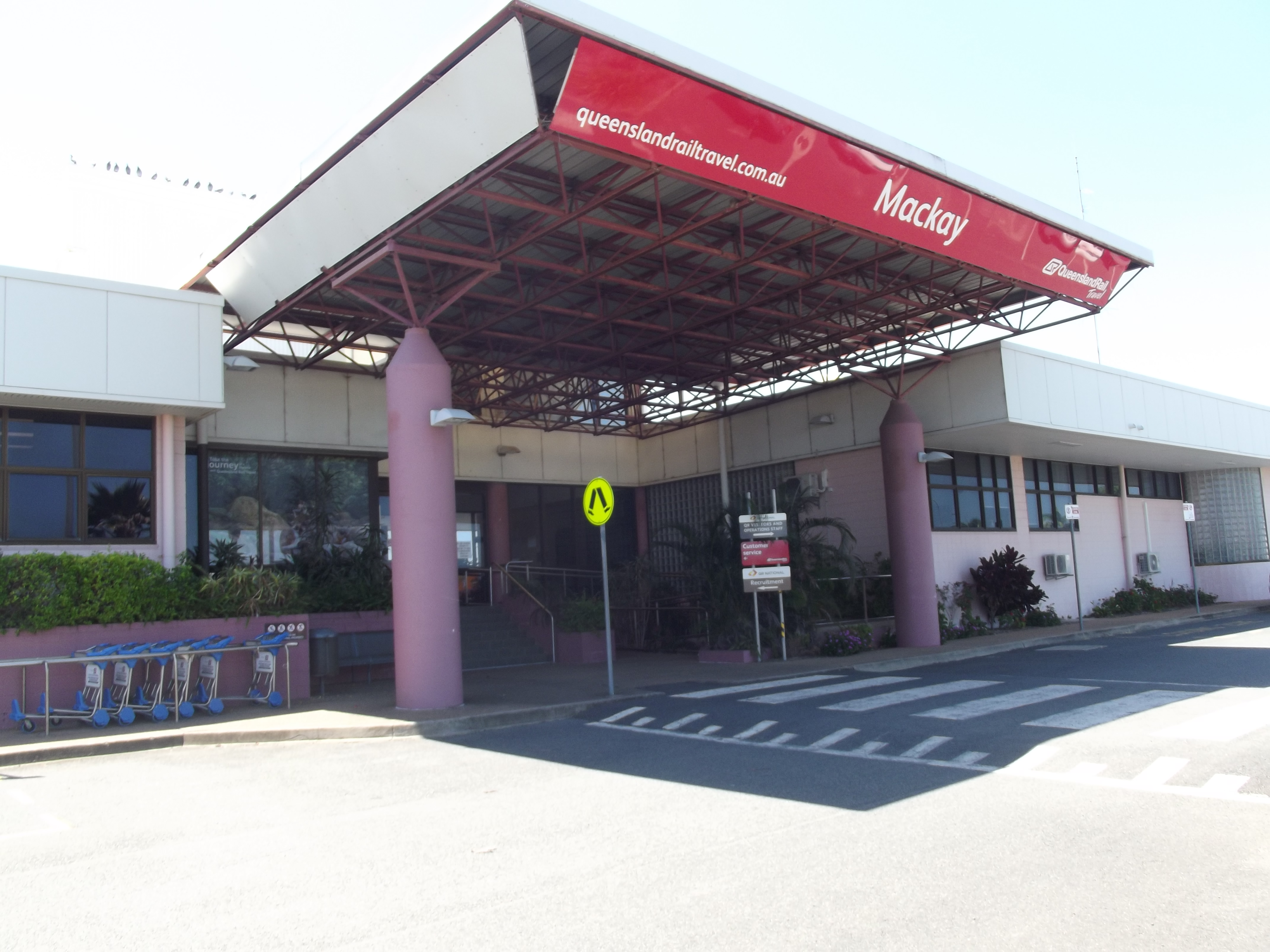
- Station front in January 2013

General information
- Location: Connors Road, Paget
- Coordinates: 21.172°S 149.1597°E
- Owner: Queensland Rail
- Operator: Traveltrain
- Line: North Coast
- Distance: 958.25 kilometres from Central
- Platforms: 2 (1 side, 1 bay)

Construction
- Structure type: Ground
- Accessible: Yes

History
- Opened: 1994

Services
Preceding station	Queensland Rail	Following station
Sarina towards Brisbane	Spirit of Queensland	Proserpine towards Cairns
Location

Mackay railway station is located on the North Coast railway line in Paget, Mackay Region, Queensland, Australia. It serves the city of Mackay. The station has one side platform and one south-facing bay platform. Opposite the station are a number of sidings that form part of a trans shipment yard north of the station.

== History ==
The original Mackay station opened in 1885 in Tennyson Street. In 1924, it was relocated to Boddington Street (21.1488°S 149.1821°E). In the 1990s, the rail bridge over the Pioneer River needed to be replaced, which presented an opportunity for re-alignment of the railway line to bypass the Mackay CBD. In 1994, the new alignment opened with the new Mackay railway station in the outer suburb of Paget.

== Services ==
Mackay is served by Traveltrain's Spirit of Queensland long-distance passenger train, which runs four days a week.
