= Shrewsbury Rock =

Coordinates: 21°30′00″S 150°16′00″E

Shrewsbury Rock, or sometimes "Shrewsbury Reef", is a rocky feature off the Queensland coast.

It is located between Hotspur Island and Pine Peak Island, within the Great Barrier Reef Marine Park.

The nearest major coastal town is Mackay.
