= Northumberland Islands =

Island chain off the coast of Queensland, Australia

Native name: Nu Tannik Ckelo
- Location within Australia

Geography
- Location: Coral Sea
- Coordinates: 21°30′S 149°40′E
- Archipelago: Northumberland Isles

Administration
- Australia
- State: Queensland

Demographics
- Population: 150 (Tourism)

The Northumberland Islands are a scattered island chain off the eastern coast of Queensland, Australia.

== Geography and history ==
The Northumberland Islands are to the south-east of the city of Mackay roughly between the latitudes 21°S and 22°S. All islands are of the continental type. The island group was named by James Cook during his historic voyage along Australia's eastern seaboard in 1770, after the First Duke of Northumberland, Hugh Percy. Both Cook and Matthew Flinders make note of the island group in their journals, Cook describing them as such:

As soon as we got round the Cape [Cape Townshend] we hauld our wind to the Westward in order to get within the Islands which lay scatter'd up and down in this bay [Shoalwater Bay] in great number, and extend out to Sea as far as we could see from the Masthead; how much farther will hardly be in my power to determine; they are as Various in their height and Circuit as they are numerous.

In 1855, a botany expedition led by naturalist Frederick Strange visited the islands on his ship Vision. Four of the expedition were killed by Aboriginal people at Middle Percy Island. Those killed were Frederick Strange and his assistant Richard Spinks, William Spurling (ship's mate) and Andrew Gittings (ship's cook and steward). Captain Chimmo of the Royal Navy vessel HMS Torch, sailed to the island and conducted an investigation. He decided to take ten of the islanders prisoner. These prisoners, including three women and three children, were sent to Sydney for trial. One child died in custody and the rest were eventually shipped back to Gladstone.

The island group is remote, and apart from charter flights to Marble Island they are accessible only by private yacht.

The Northumberland Islands are further subdivided into smaller groups: the Bedwell Group, Beverley Group, Broad Sound Islands, Duke Islands, Flat Isles, Guardfish Cluster and Percy Isles (within the locality The Percy Group). The islands are listed below, with the geographical coordinates of the largest islands given. Only the major islands of each group are listed.

== Bedwell Group ==
Name origin: Staff Commander E. P. Bedwell, surveyor

- Calliope Island
- Connor Islet
- Innes Island
- George Island
- Poynter Island 21°50′S 149°47′E

== Beverley Group ==
Name origin: Unknown

- Beverlac Island
- Digby Island 21°30′S 149°56′E
- Double Island
- Henderson Island
- Hull Island
- Keelan Island
- Knight Island
- Minster Island
- Noel Island
- Prudhoe Island 21°19′S 149°41′E

== Broad Sound Islands ==
Name origin: Situated at the mouth of Broad Sound, a vast inlet named by Cook in 1770

- Long Island 22°10′S 149°53′E
- Quail Island22°08′S 149°59′E
- Tern Island
- Wild Duck Island 22°01′S 149°52′E

== Duke Islands ==
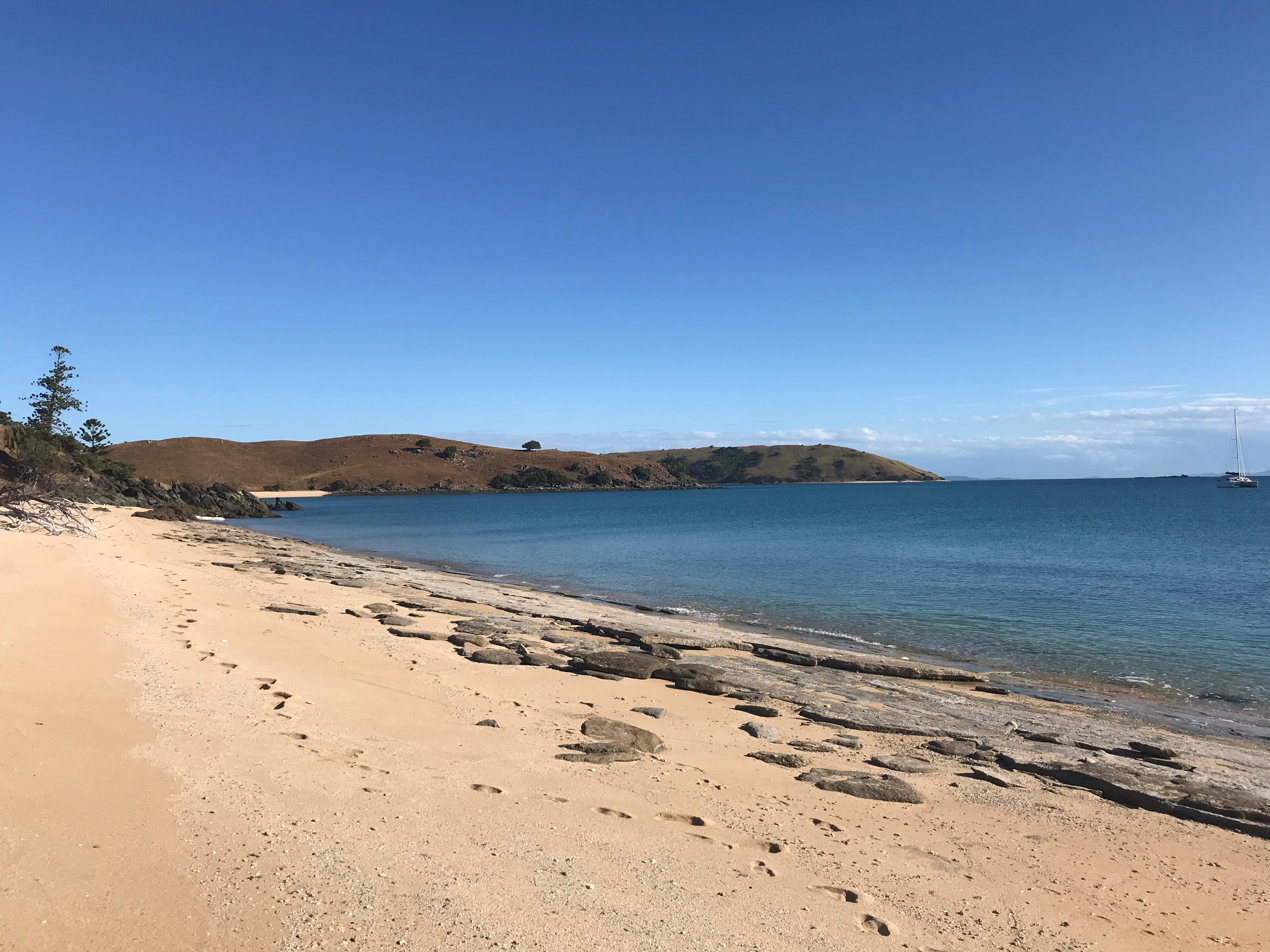
Western side of Hunter Island looking toward Tynemouth Island (Duke Islands)

Name origin: Unknown

- Alnwick Island
- Bamborough Island
- Cheviot Island
- Hexham Island 22°02′S 150°22′E
- High Peak Island 21°57′S 150°41′E
- Hunter Island
- Iron Islet 21°59′05″S 150°09′16″E
- Marble Island 21°59′S 150°11′E
- Otterbourne Island
- Shields Island
- Steep Island
- Tweed Island
- Tynemouth Island

== Flat Isles ==
Name origin: Named by Flinders in 1802 due to their height - Avoid Island is the highest at 33 metres above sea level

- Aquila Island 21°58′S 149°33′E
- Avoid Island
- Flock Pigeon Island 22°08′S 149°34′E
- Red Clay Island

== Guardfish Cluster ==
Name origin: Unknown

- Bluff Island
- Curlew Island 21°37′S 149°48′E
- Tinonee Peak Island

== Percy Isles ==
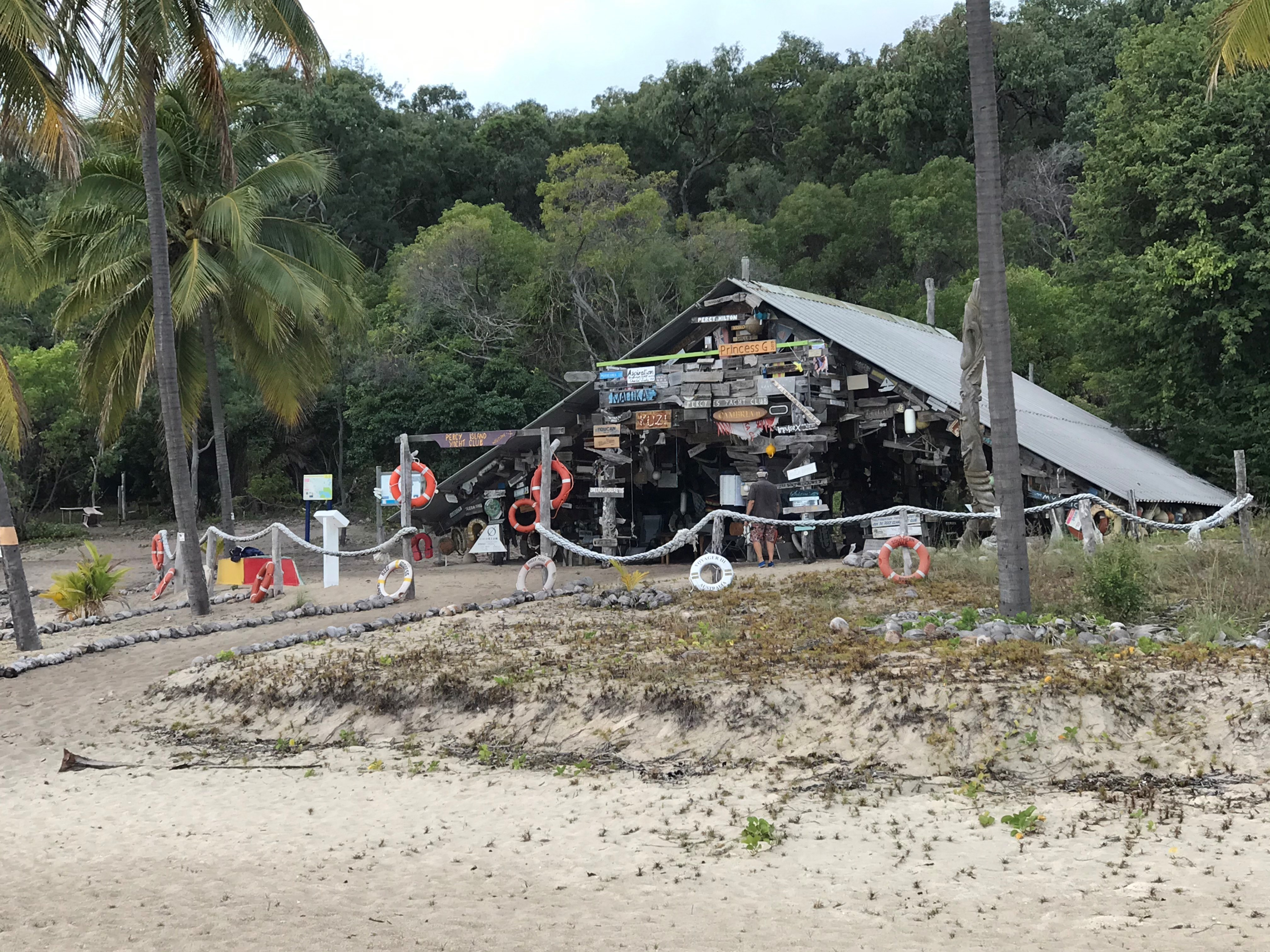
A-Frame yacht club on Middle Percy Island (Percy Isles)

Name origin: Named by Flinders in 1802 after the Duke of Northumberland's family name

- Hotspur Island
- Shrewsbury Rock
- Middle Percy Island 21°39′S 150°16′E
- North East Island
- Pine Islet
- Pine Peak Island
- South Percy Island21°46′S 150°20′E
- Sphinx Island
- Walter Island

== See also ==
- Northumberland Islands National Park
