= St Lawrence railway station, Queensland =

Railway station in Queensland, Australia

St Lawrence
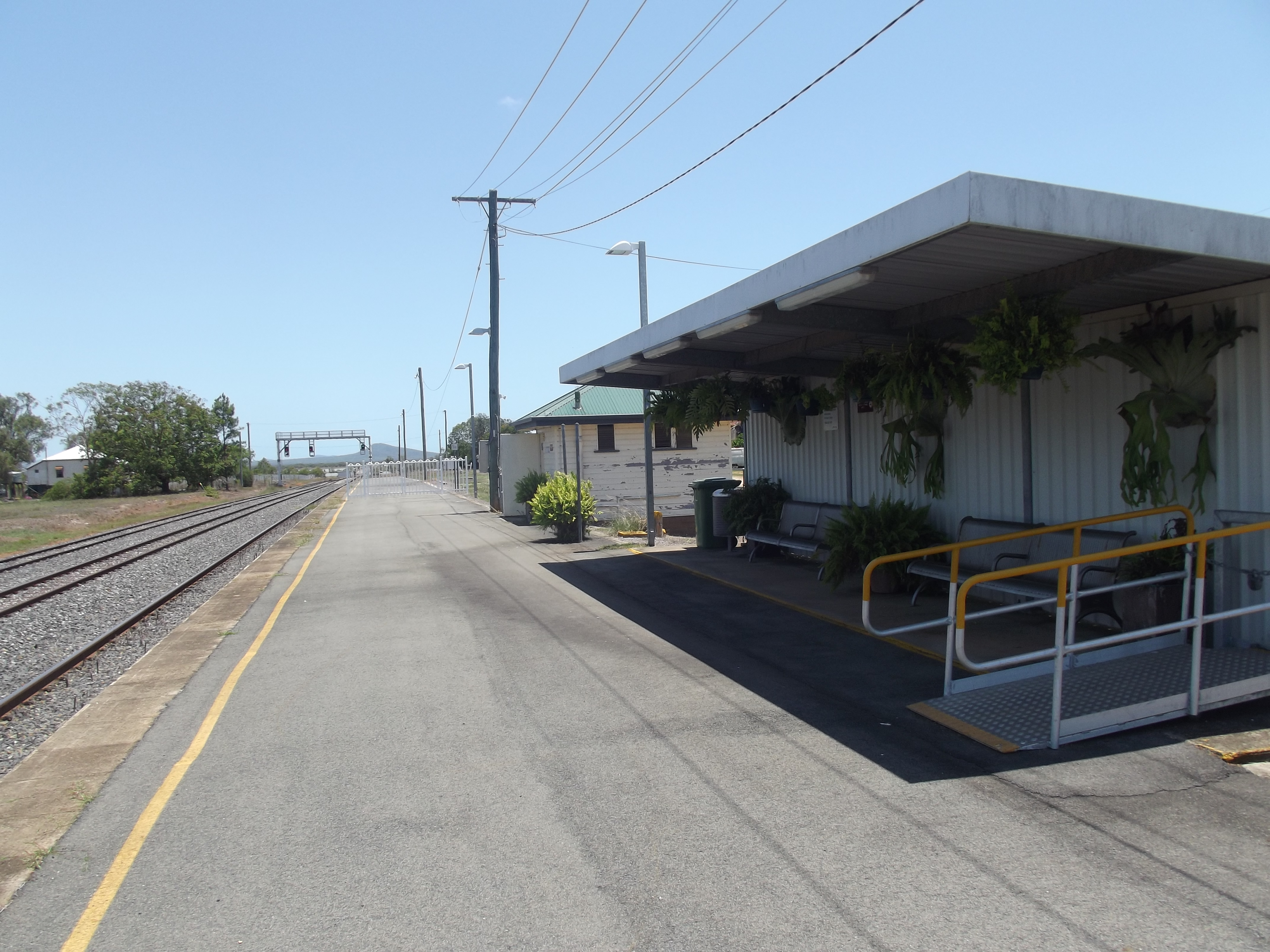
- Northbound view in January 2013

General information
- Location: Railway Parade, St Lawrence
- Coordinates: 22.351°S 149.523°E
- Owner: Queensland Rail
- Operator: Traveltrain
- Line: North Coast
- Distance: 792.51 kilometres from Central
- Platforms: 1
- Tracks: 3

Construction
- Structure type: Ground
- Accessible: Yes

Services
Preceding station	Queensland Rail	Following station
Rockhampton towards Brisbane	Spirit of Queensland	Carmila towards Cairns
Location

St Lawrence railway station is located on the North Coast line in Queensland, Australia. It serves the town of St Lawrence. Opposite the single platform lie two crossing loops.

== Services ==
St Lawrence is served by Traveltrain's Spirit of Queensland service.
