= Northumberland Islands National Park =

National park in Australia

- IUCN category II (national park)
- Location within Queensland
- Location: Queensland
- Coordinates: 21°19′02″S 149°40′50″E
- Area: 15.00 km^{2} (5.79 sq mi)
- Established: 1994
- Governing body: Queensland Parks and Wildlife Service

Northumberland Islands is a national park in North Queensland, Australia, 763 km northwest of Brisbane.

== See also ==
- Northumberland Islands
- Protected areas of Queensland
