= SDSR =

SDSR is a four-letter abbreviation which may refer to:

- Southern Downs Steam Railway, a tourist railway found in the Darling Downs region of Queensland, Australia
- Strategic Defence and Security Review (disambiguation), three of the defence strategy policy reviews of the United Kingdom
