= Stanthorpe railway station =

Railway station in Queensland, Australia

Stanthorpe
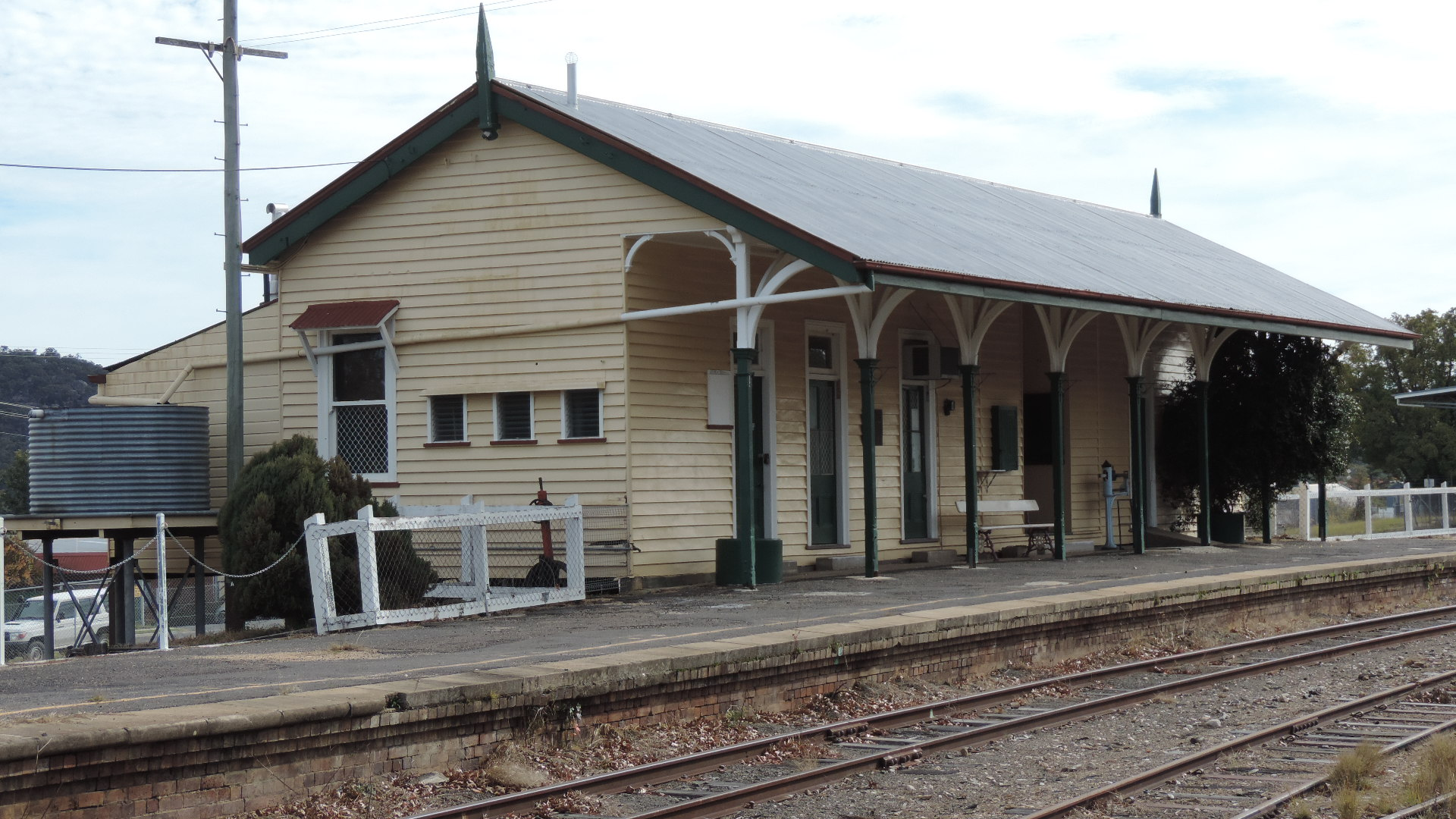
- Station in June 2015

General information
- Location: Davaldi Street, Stanthorpe
- Coordinates: 28.65789°S 151.93766°E
- Elevation: 714.1 metres (2,343 ft)
- Owner: Queensland Rail
- Operator: Traveltrain
- Line: Southern
- Distance: 331.5 km (206 mi) from Brisbane
- Platforms: 1
- Tracks: 2

Construction
- Structure type: Ground

History
- Opened: 3 May 1881
Location

Stanthorpe railway station is located on the Southern line in Queensland, Australia, serving the town of Stanthorpe.

== History ==
Stanthorpe station opened on 3 March 1881, when the Queensland Railway's Southern line was extended from Warwick. It served as the terminus of the line until it was extended to Wallangarra on 14 February 1887.

In April 1927, the station was visited by the Duke and Duchess of York.

== Services ==
Until 1972, Stanthorpe was served by passenger trains operating between Brisbane and Wallangarra. The station remains in place and is used as a calling point by Downs Explorer (formerly the Southern Downs Steam Railway) heritage services.
