= Summit Station =

Summit Station may refer to:

== Train stations ==
- Summit railway station, Wellington Region, a former railway station in New Zealand
- Summit station (Illinois), a rail station in Illinois, United States
- Summit tram stop, a railway station in Wales, United Kingdom
- Summit station (NJ Transit), a rail station in New Jersey, United States
- Summit railway station (Snowdon Mountain Railway), a railway station in Wales, United Kingdom

== Other uses ==
- Summit Station, Greenland, a research station in Greenland
- Summit Station, Pennsylvania, an unincorporated place in Schuylkill County, Pennsylvania, United States
- Summit Station (lesbian bar), first and longest run lesbian bar in Columbus, Ohio
- Summit station and Summit Club station, a pair of remote flag stops in Quebec served by VIA Rail's Montreal–Jonquière train
- Summit Station, California:
  - Beaumont, California, in Riverside County
  - Tehachapi, California, in Kern County

== See also ==
- The Summit railway station, a railway station in Queensland, Australia
- Snaefell Summit railway station, a railway station on the Isle of Man
- Summit Tank railway station, a railway station in New South Wales, Australia
