= The Summit railway station =

Former railway station in Queensland, Australia

The Summit
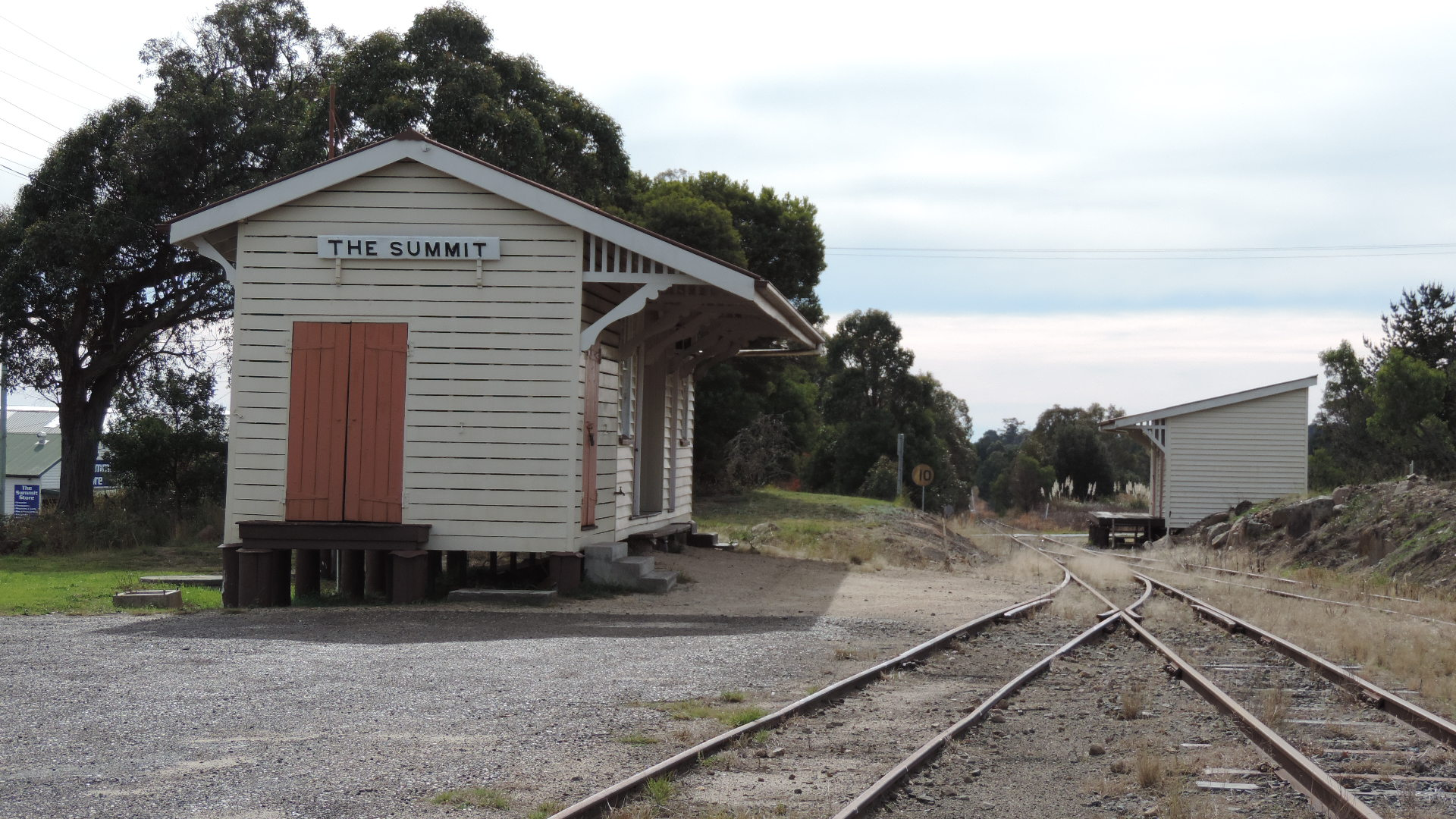
- Northbound view in June 2015

General information
- Location: Granite Belt Drive, The Summit
- Coordinates: 28.574600°S 151.949543°E
- Elevation: 923.5 metres (3,030 ft)
- Owner: Queensland Rail
- Operator: Traveltrain
- Line: Southern
- Distance: 307 kilometres from Brisbane
- Platforms: 1
- Tracks: 1

Construction
- Structure type: Ground

Other information
- Status: Closed

History
- Opened: 3 March 1881
Location

The Summit railway station is located on the Southern line in Queensland, Australia. It services the town of The Summit, a fruit growing district in the Granite Belt. At 923.5 metres (3,030 ft) above sea level, it is the highest station in the state.

== History ==
The Summit station opened on 3 March 1881, when the Queensland Railway's Southern line was extended from Warwick to Stanthorpe. It was served by freight trains conveying apples for Golden Circle until 2007.
