= Wallangarra railway station =

Wallangarra
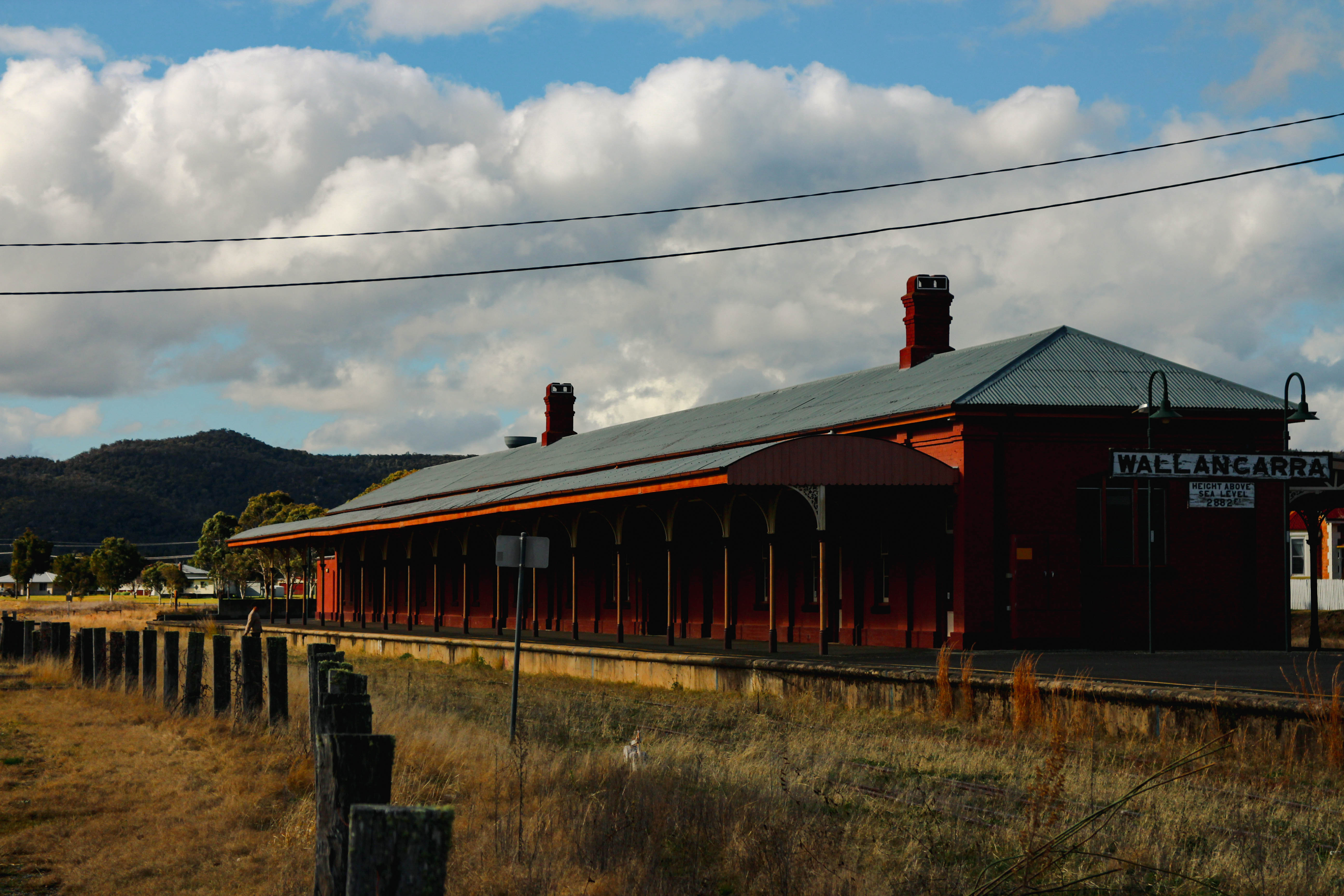
- Queensland platform (western side), July 2025

General information
- Location: Rockwell Street, Wallangarra; Australia
- Coordinates: 28.9232°S 151.9319°E
- Elevation: 878 metres (2,881 ft)
- Owner: Queensland Rail
- Operator: Traveltrain
- Lines: Main Northern (New South Wales); Southern (Queensland)
- Distance: 792.81 km (492.63 mi) from Sydney; 358.49 km (222.76 mi) from Brisbane
- Platforms: 2 (1 island)
- Tracks: 4

Construction
- Structure type: Ground

Other information
- Status: Disused

History
- Opened: 4 February 1887 (139 years ago)

Services
Preceding station	Former services	Following station
Terminus	Main Northern Line	Sunnyside towards Sydney
- Location within Queensland
- 28.9213°S 151.9327°E
- Location: Woodlawn Street, Wallangarra, Southern Downs Region, Queensland, Australia

History
- Design period: 1870s–1890s (late 19th century)
- Built: 1887–1890s circa

Queensland Heritage Register
- Official name: Wallangarra Railway Station and Complex
- Type: state heritage (landscape, built)
- Designated: 28 March 2003
- Reference no.: 601242
- Significant period: 1887–1972 (historical)
- Significant components: railway siding, office/s, residential accommodation – station master's house/quarters, out building/s, yards – livestock, platform, railway station, furniture/fittings, loading bay/dock, views to
- Builder: George Bashford
Location

Wallangarra railway station is a heritage-listed disused railway station located on both the Southern line and Main North line, which served the Darling Downs town of Wallangarra in Queensland, and the New England town of Jennings in New South Wales. It was built in 1877 along the state border and was added to the Queensland Heritage Register on 28 March 2003.

Wallangarra railway station was on the only railway route between Sydney and Brisbane and had to handle the break-of-gauge where Queensland Railways' 1,067 mm (3 ft 6 in) Southern line met the New South Wales Government Railways' 1,435 mm (4 ft 8 1/2 in) Main Northern line. Wallangarra was the terminating point for the Sydney Mail, with passengers transferring to the Brisbane Limited for the remainder of the journey to Sydney. In 1930 New South Wales's North Coast line from Sydney to Brisbane was completed; as it used only standard gauge for the whole route, it was a more efficient route than travelling via Wallangarra, leading to the decline of Wallangarra station. However, Wallangarra continued to be served by passenger trains until the services from Brisbane and Sydney were truncated at Toowoomba and Tenterfield respectively on 1 February 1972.

== History ==
Wallangarra railway station opened on 14 February 1887, when the Queensland Railway's 1,067 mm (3 ft 6 in) Southern line was extended from Stanthorpe to Wallangarra. On 16 January 1888, the New South Wales Government Railways' 1,435 mm (4 ft 8 1/2 in) Main Northern line was extended from Tenterfield to Wallangarra, thereby opening an inter-colonial rail link between Brisbane and Sydney. Because of the break-of-gauge, the Wallangarra railway station was built astride the state border with a single island platform with one building, with the western side for by the narrow gauge line from Queensland and the eastern side by the standard gauge line from New South Wales. Each side of the building sported the awnings and signage of Queensland Railways and New South Wales Railways respectively. Even though the two lines shared a common station at Wallangarra (which sits astride the border), the New South Wales side of the station was initially named Jennings after the town on the New South Wales side of the border but ultimately became known as Wallangarra. Temporary buildings were first erected with the permanent buildings being erected from 1887 to 1890.

The first section of Queensland's Southern and Western Railways had opened between Ipswich and Bigges Camp (Grandchester) on 31 July 1865. The railway was constructed to link the pastoral areas of the Darling Downs, with the head of navigation on the Bremer River at Ipswich. The Southern and Western Railway was progressively extended to reach Toowoomba in April 1867, following completion of the Main Range section of the railway. Further westward extension of the Western line from Ipswich to Dalby was completed in 1868.

The Southern line serving the southern part of the Darling Downs to Warwick was built in two sections was approved by the Queensland Parliament in 1865. However major financial difficulties for the colony saw that the line was not completed to Hendon until 1869 and through to Warwick until 1871. An indirect route from Ipswich was chosen branching off the western line near Gowrie railway station, and running south via Westbrook, to save on construction costs.

The discovery of tin south of Warwick at Stannum Creek, and around present day Stanthorpe, in 1871 encourages a rush of miners to the area. The first agitation for an extension came from miners and people on the tin fields wanting closer communication with Brisbane and its port. A large amount of goods was also transported over the inter-colonial border and shipped from Northern New South Wales, whilst ore was also treated at a special smelter built in Brisbane. It was hoped that railway connections with Brisbane would secure this traffic for Queensland.

A trial survey undertaken from Warwick to Stanthorpe in 1873 identified difficulties that would be experienced in construction of a railway line through the Granite Belt, the cost of which prevented any action being taken. Two more surveys were completed in 1876 and 1877, and importantly these surveys continued beyond Stanthorpe through to the Queensland/New South Wales border. Construction from Warwick to Stanthorpe was approved in August 1877. The section from Warwick to Stanthorpe was divided into two sections and work commenced in 1878 being completed in 1881.

In March 1878, Queensland railway engineer Henry Charles Stanley consulted with his counterparts in the New South Wales Government over a suitable route for a future railway interconnection between the two states. At that time, there were plans to extend the NSW railway to Tenterfield, so they agreed a route that followed the old Ballandean road from Stanthorpe to Tenterfield with a border crossing point at (what would subsequently become) Wallangarra. In May 1878, Queensland surveyor George Phillips and New South Wales surveyor Mr Francis agreed the best place for the two railways to meet was at the border at the location that is now Wallangarra.

In 1884, after confirming the border crossing location with the New South Wales Government, the Queensland Parliament approved plans for extension of the line southwards from Stanthorpe to the Queensland-New South Wales border via Ballandean. In August 1884, Queensland's chief railway engineer Stanley travelled to Sydney to meet with the New South Wales authorities having prepared designs for the railway station on the border that would meet the need of both colonies. Recognising that the Queensland railway extension towards the border was more advanced than the New South Wales extension, it was agreed that Queensland should construct the border railway station and that New South Wales would contribute to the cost.

In April 1885, the Queensland Government awarded the contract for the 25 miles 19 chains (40.6 km) extension of the railway to the border to the railway contractors George Bashford and Company for £140,885/8/2, with an expected completion date of June 1887. In May 1885, the Queensland Government announced the sale of land in the new border township of Wallangarra, with 179 town lots to be auctioned at a starting price of £8 per acre. On 29 June 1885, the sale of the land was an "extraordinary success" with all lots sold for prices ranging from £26 to £131 per lot (about £500 per acre).

In February 1886, Queensland provided New South Wales with the detailed plans costing £28,000 for the railway station at Wallangarra, but in March 1886 New South Wales declared the cost too expensive. The New South Wales Premier, Patrick Jennings, then proposed that Tenterfield rather than Wallangarra should be the meeting point and break-of-gauge for the two railways. There was considerable support for the Tenterfield proposal in New South Wales, mostly arguing that Tenterfield was an established town whereas Wallangarra was, in the words of New South Wales Premier Henry Parkes, "nothing but a desolate wilderness". Even within Queensland, there was support for Tenterfield with the Brisbane Chamber of Commerce arguing that a Tenterfield break-of-gauge would open up new markets for Queensland in northern New South Wales (as the transhipping cost at Wallangarra would be avoided). In October 1886, the New South Wales railway extension to Tenterfield was opened; only the gap between Wallangarra and Tenterfield remained to be complete and that remained subject to the break-of-gauge dispute.

However, even as the issue of the location of the break-of-gauge was still being hotly debated in the newspapers, the Queensland Government pushed on with constructing the railway according to the original agreements. The Queensland Commissioner for Railways gave instructions on 18 November 1886 for a smaller permanent station to be constructed wholly on the Queensland side of the border at Wallangarra at a cost of £6,000 but with the platform and station yard layout designed to incorporate the eventual extension of the New South Wales standard gauge lines to the border. . On 14 February 1887 the Queensland railway line was opened to the border. On 26 February 1887 the contract for the building of a station master's residence, goods shed, and removal of the carriage and engine sheds from Stanthorpe to Wallangarra was awarded to George Bashford and Company for £2509. In May 1887, Premier Parkes accepted that agreements entered into by his predecessor Jennings had "hopelessly committed" New South Wales to accept Wallangarra as the break-of-gauge location.

The New South Wales government completed its railway line to the Wallangarra station in January 1888, although it did not erect awnings over its platform until 1890. On 17 January 1888, the first Brisbane-to-Sydney service left Brisbane.

The transhipping station and yards of the Wallangarra railway station led to the creation of two townships on the border, Wallangarra on the Queensland side and Jennings on the New South Wales side. Several years after the railway station was opened linking the two state railway lines, the border township of Wallangarra was described as being of "quite a pretentious appearance consisting of butchers, bakers, blacksmiths and with an aerated water factory".

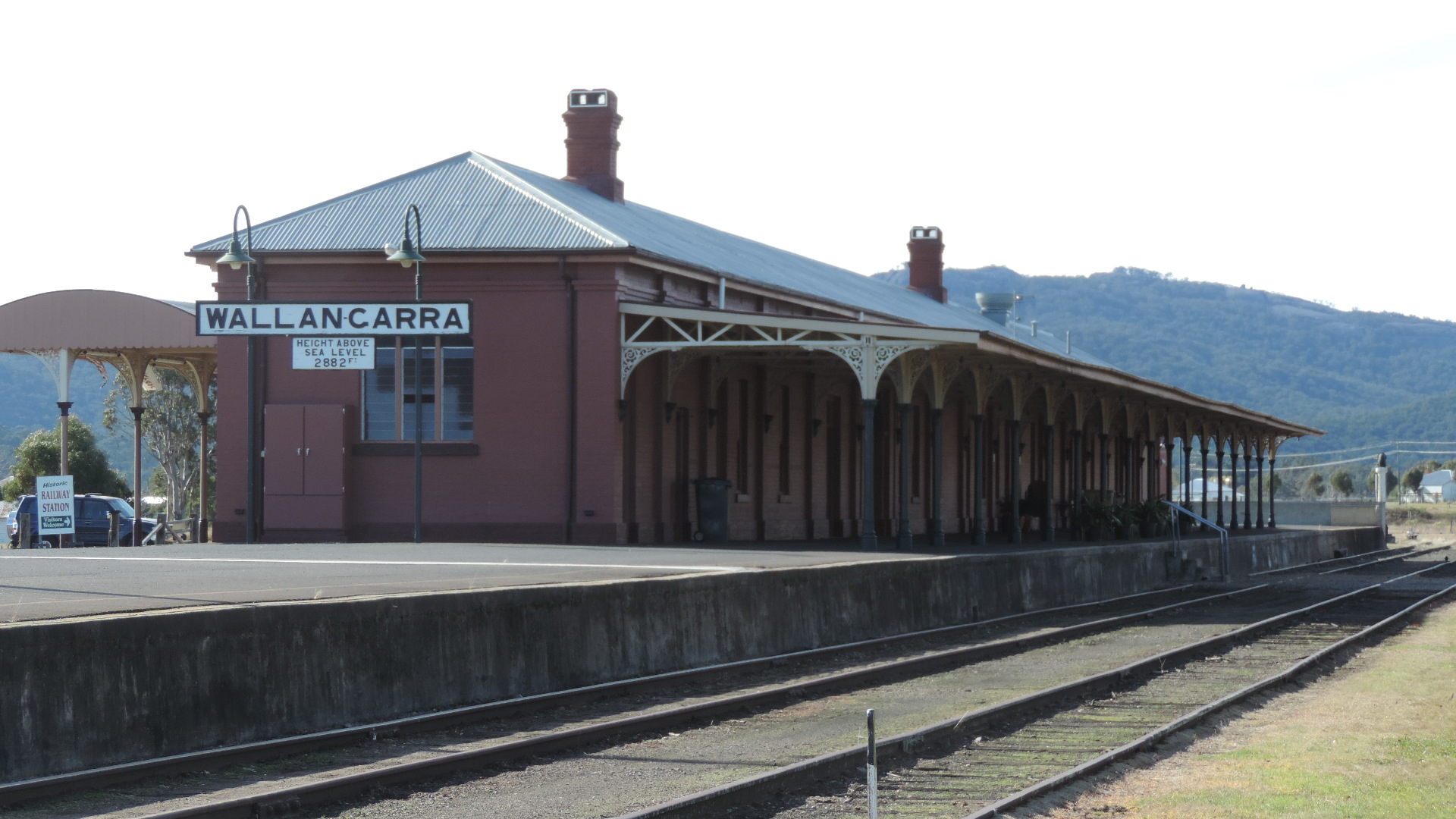
New South Wales platform(eastern side), 2015

The station was built on an island platform, with station awnings on both sides. The Queensland side awnings (western platform) being to Queensland design patterns and that on the standard gauge side (eastern platform) being built after New South Wales pattern. Both colonies had name boards in their usual style. The original station building occupies the present southern section, and consisted of office, lobby, store and closets. The booking office also served as the customs office and general waiting room as well as the Station Master's office. In 1892, drawings were prepared by Henrik Hansen for a new bar, dining room, refreshment room, female staff (girls) bedrooms and kitchen. The Queensland/New South Wales border forms part of the fenceline for the Station Masters property. The station master's residence was unusual for a Queensland station residence as it was constructed in brick. A Post Office was opened in the station in March 1887.

While Queensland always officially called the station Wallangarra (although usually wrote it as Wallan-garra after circa 1908), the naming of the railway station by the New South Wales authorities was inconsistent and caused confusion to travellers. On 16 January 1888, the New South Wales named it Jennings, but renamed it Wallangarra on 1 February 1889. On 1 October 1889, it became Jennings for the second time but reverted to Wallangarra on 1 January 1890. On 1 January 1891 it became Jennings for the third time, reverting finally to Wallangarra in April 1904.

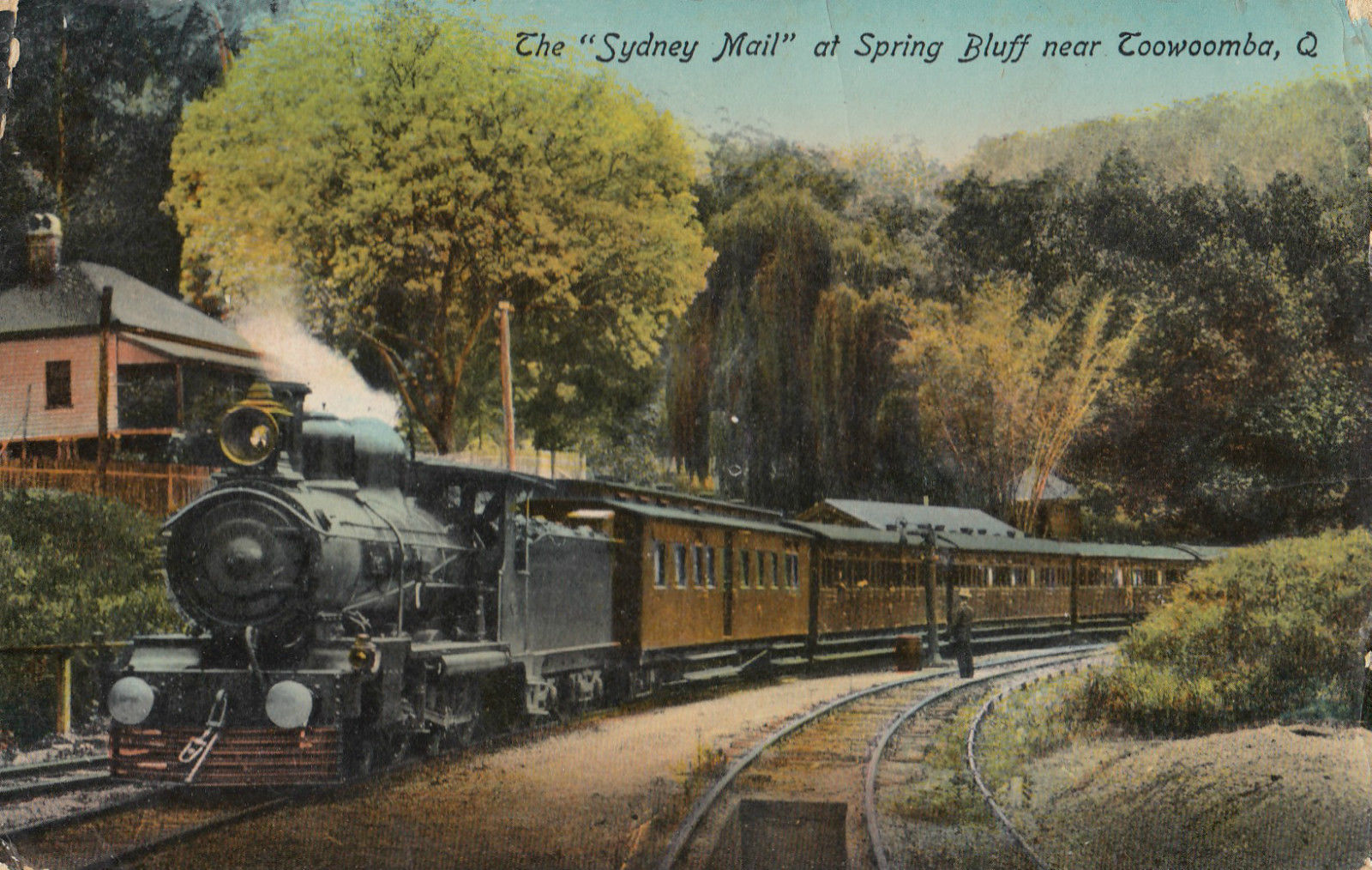
Sydney Mail at Spring Bluff, 1915

By 1884, the train travelling between Brisbane and Stanthorpe had been referred to as a "Mail" train running with a Travelling Post Office. The opening of the inter-colonial line in 1888 saw the introduction of a regular train service between Sydney and Brisbane, known as the "Sydney Mail" (26 Up) and (37 Down) were the premier service of the era. The timetable was improved in 1894 and remained unchanged until 1908, when a more powerful locomotive C16 class was introduced. In 1923, a new and heavier Sydney Mail train was constructed consisting of nine carriages including a parlour car based on observation platform at the rear of the train, to be hauled at what was the time the most powerful locomotives on a narrow gauge in Australia.

In 1921, the Federal Royal Commission into Standard Gauge had recommended that the mainland States of Australia and the Australian Government commit themselves to providing a uniform railway network linking the capital cities of Australia with a common gauge. As part of the standardisation of the disparate gauges, a new link between Sydney and Brisbane via Kyogle, New South Wales was identified as being a central element. Queensland, in 1924, passed the South Brisbane Kyogle Grafton Act committing itself to the construction of a new standard gauge railway from South Brisbane railway station to the border with New South Wales. As part of this, New South Wales demanded a bridge over the Clarence River at Grafton and the upgrading of the Kyogle branch. The Australian Government provided half the funding for the project. The interstate standard gauge railway line between Kyogle and South Brisbane opened in 1930. The importance of the Toowoomba-Wallangarra southern line diminished, as the new link via northern New South Wales and the Richmond Gap into Queensland did not involve a change of trains at a border station.

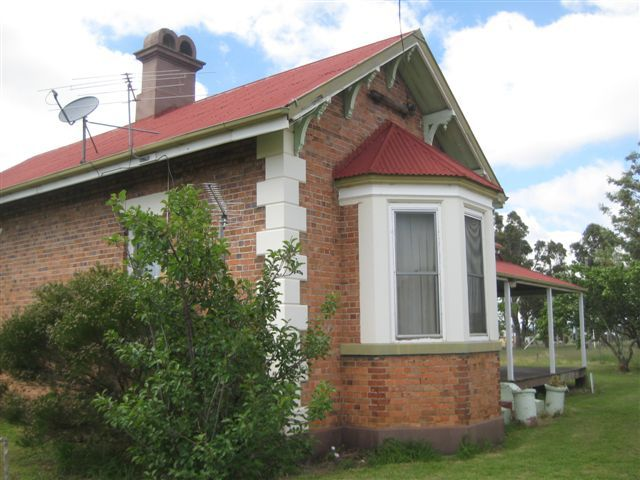
Station master's house, 2008

During the time of the Second World War the strategic importance of Wallangarra was vital in providing an inland transhipment and staging point during the defence of Australia. Large numbers of workers were employed to tranship goods in the New South Wales section of the yard. The extensive yard and station complex at this time consisted of the station building, closets and horse dock at the southern end of the station platform (the border dock). Refreshment Room staff and ambulance quarters were situated at the north end of the platform. On the western (Queensland) side was a goods office, casual crew quarters with dining room, frame tent and library. To the north-east an engine shed was situated, reserve coal dump, locomotive coal stage, tool room, ASM's residence (1919), ganger's residence (1919) and trucking yards. On the east side (New South Wales) was the Station Master's residence (1887), 25 ton weighbridge, lamp room, waitresses quarters and the footwarmer furnace. Quarters were also provided for laundresses. Most of these ancillary buildings are now removed.

The last Sydney Mail (26 Up) ran on 29 January 1972, and the Brisbane-Wallangarra service was withdrawn as of 1 February 1972. The Wallangarra Refreshment Rooms closed to the public on 5 August 1973. With the cessation of passenger services on the Queensland side of the border, the line reverted to a goods-only basis. With the continuing decline of Wallangarra the decision was taken in 1984 to abolish one of the two positions of Assistant Station Master.

In 1988, the New South Wales line from Tenterfield to Wallangarra closed. The last train to operate north of Tenterfield was an Australian Railway Historical Society charter on 15 January 1988 hauled by diesel locomotive 4487. However, in the same year, Queensland Rail installed a gantry crane formerly used at Clapham Yard in Brisbane. The line northwards of Guyra in New South Wales, and then Armidale was progressively mothballed by New South Wales's State Rail Authority. In March 1994 the Assistant Station Master's and Ganger Residences at Wallangarra were sold. The Station Master's residence was sold in 1994–1995, and the Station Officer withdrawn in 1995. The Southern line south of Warwick was threatened with closure in 1993–1994, but the link was retained due to community protest, and a twice weekly goods service was still operated. In recent times trains have only been run on an as required basis, and all station staff withdrawn leaving Wallangarra as an unattended station.

Queensland Rail ceased freight services to Wallangarra in March 2007. The Australian Railway Historical Society operated a twice yearly service to Wallangarra as The Winelander. It last ran in February 2014 before the withdrawal of the carriage stock.

It is a popular destination for steam locomotive hauled specials, with Downs Explorer (formerly the Southern Downs Steam Railway) regularly operating services from Warwick.

== Description ==
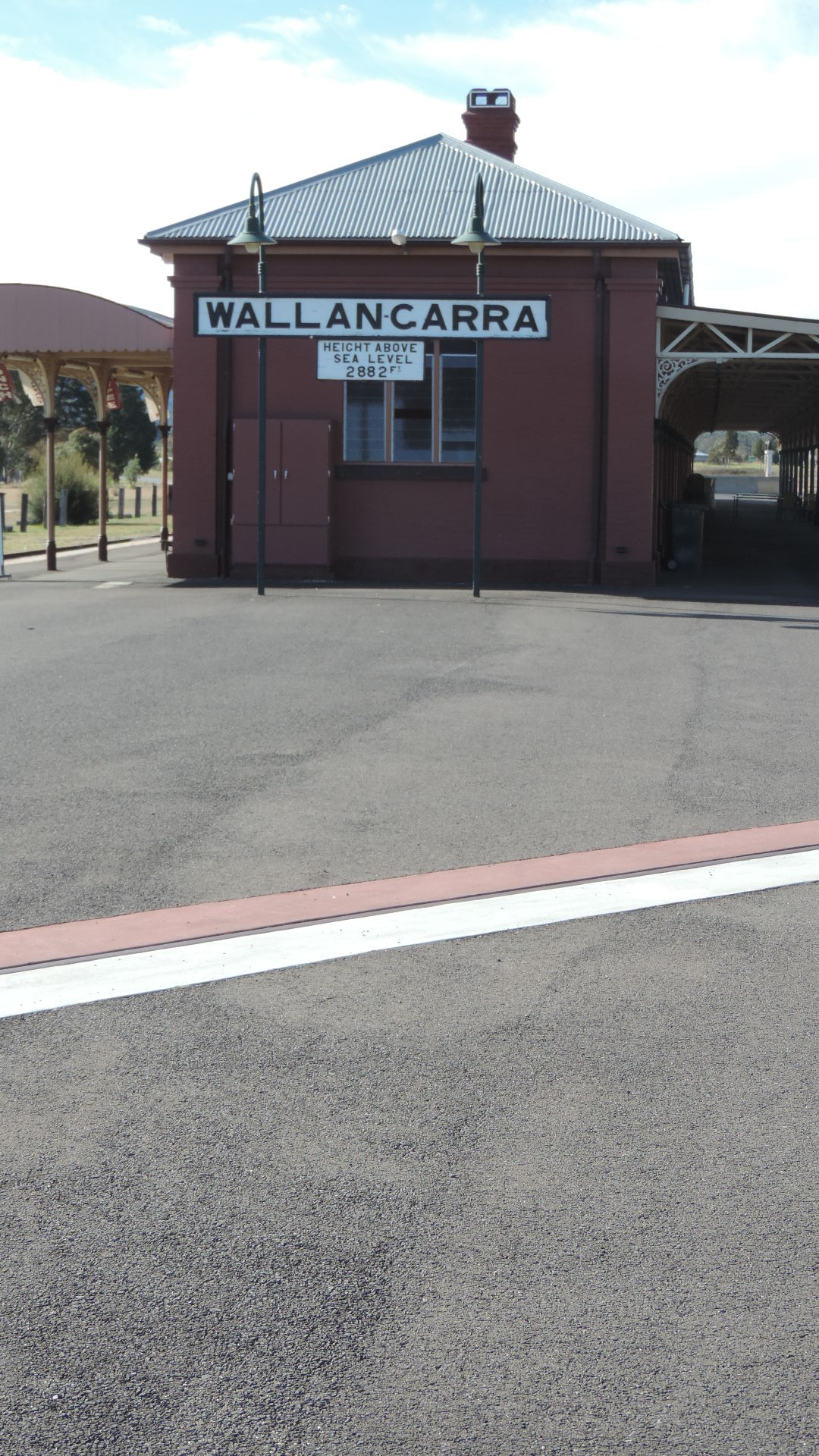
Wallangarra railway station with the state border marked in paint in the foreground, 2015

The station building consists of a long double-sided single-storey hip roofed brick station with cast iron verandahs The Brisbane platform which has a cast iron curved shade similar to South Brisbane and Emerald stations. A small-stock slaughtering yard consisting of high-walled brick for the refreshment rooms adjoined the station building. The New South Wales side awning was built in 1890, and is sheeted with flat raked iron. Brackets and columns were cast by the Toowoomba Foundry. The elevations now overpainted, have pilasters at regular intervals with archways marking the location of the original lobby. Internally space was provided for offices and a large kitchen, dining room and bar.

The offices are located to the south of the present ticket lobby with refreshment rooms and post office now vacated to the north where there is also an enclosed yard (slaughtering yard). The refreshment room fittings have been removed. The station platform features a two road horse dock platform at its southern end. The Queensland/New South Wales border diagonally crosses the platform approximately 2 metres (6 ft 7 in) to the north of the horse dock platform.

The Station Master's house faces the Sydney platform and is constructed of brick. It is an asymmetrical villa, being constructed in a L-shape with faceted bay in the projecting wing, posted verandah (reconstructed), stuccoed quoins and decorative brackets to the gable ends, and prominent chimneys.

To the west of the station are two buildings identified by Ward in his survey as being the Locomotive Inspector's quarters and running men (crew) quarters.

== Heritage listing ==
Wallangarra Railway Station and Complex was listed on the Queensland Heritage Register on 28 March 2003 having satisfied the following criteria.

The place is important in demonstrating the evolution or pattern of Queensland's history.

Wallangarra railway station, associated trackwork in the railway yard and ancillary railway buildings situated at Wallangarra on the border of Queensland and New South Wales are important in demonstrating the pattern of transportation and communications in Queensland's history. In particular it demonstrates the pre-eminence of rail transport in the nineteenth and early twentieth century in Australia. The station building and yardwork was the response to the meeting between two separate colonial railway systems at a border using separate railway gauges.

The place demonstrates rare, uncommon or endangered aspects of Queensland's cultural heritage.

It is a rare complex of its type, being especially comparable nationally with Serviceton on the Victoria/South Australian border (1888) in terms of its construction date, large size and redundancy. It compares also with other late Victorian border stations at Albury and Wodonga.

The station building and Station Masters residence are uncommon in Queensland as being constructed of masonry.

The place is important in demonstrating the principal characteristics of a particular class of cultural places.

The station building and yardwork was the response to the meeting between two separate colonial railway systems at a border using separate railway gauges.

== Engineering heritage award ==
The station received a Historic Engineering Marker from Engineers Australia as part of its Engineering Heritage Recognition Program.
