= Southern railway line, Queensland =

Railway line in Queensland, Australia

Southern railway line
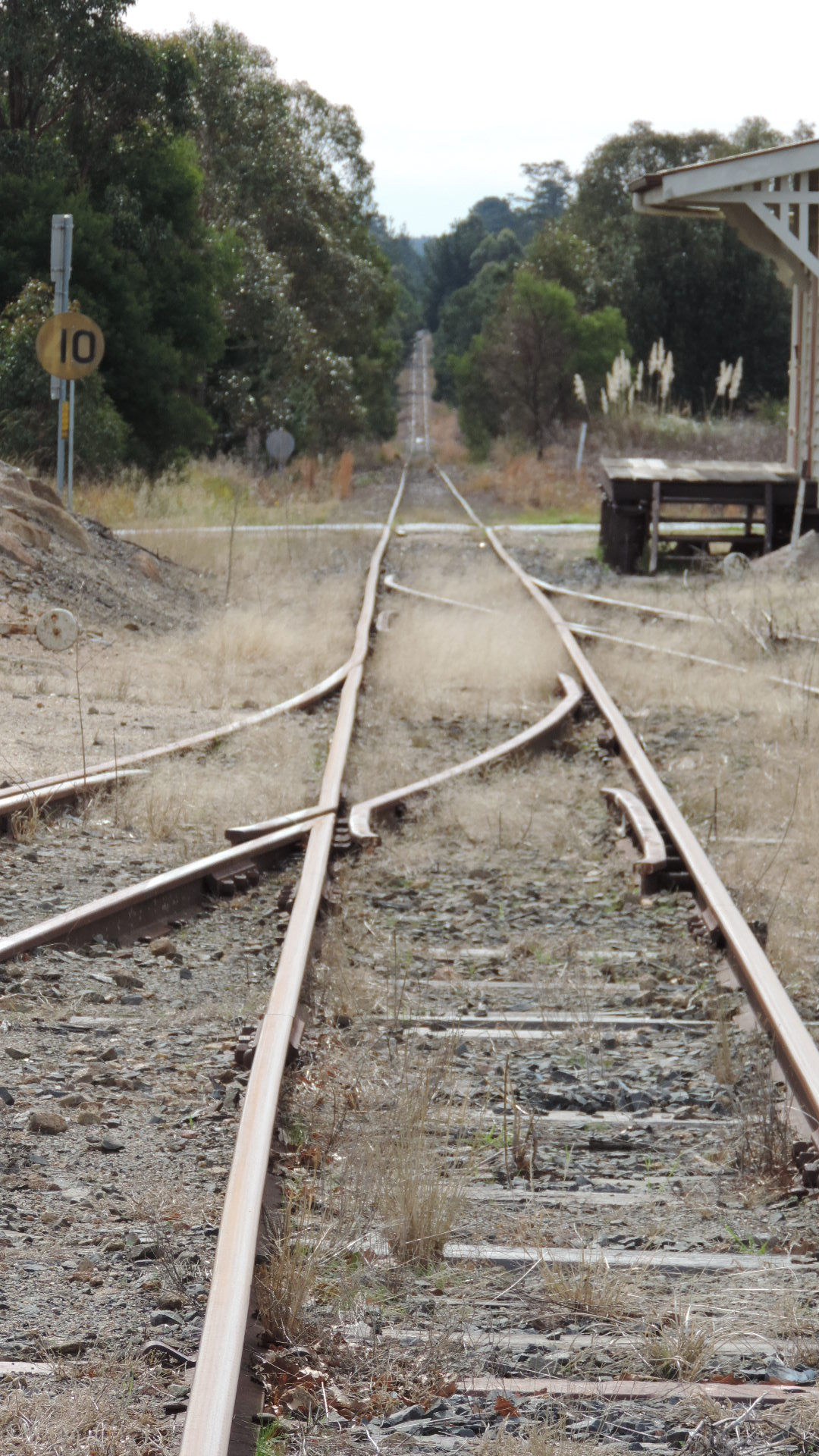
- Southern railway line at The Summit in June 2015 looking north towards Warwick, Toowoomba and Brisbane.

Technical
- Track gauge: 1,067 mm (3 ft 6 in)
- Train protection system: ATP from Toowoomba to Harristown

The Southern railway line serves the Darling Downs region of Queensland, Australia. The 197-kilometre (122 mi) long line branches from the Western line at Toowoomba, 161 kilometres (100 mi) west of Brisbane, and proceeds south through Warwick and Stanthorpe to the New South Wales/Queensland state border at Wallangarra. Following bushfires in 2023, the line from Stanthorpe to Wallangarra was permanently closed, but in February 2025, the line was reopened to Ballandean.

== History ==
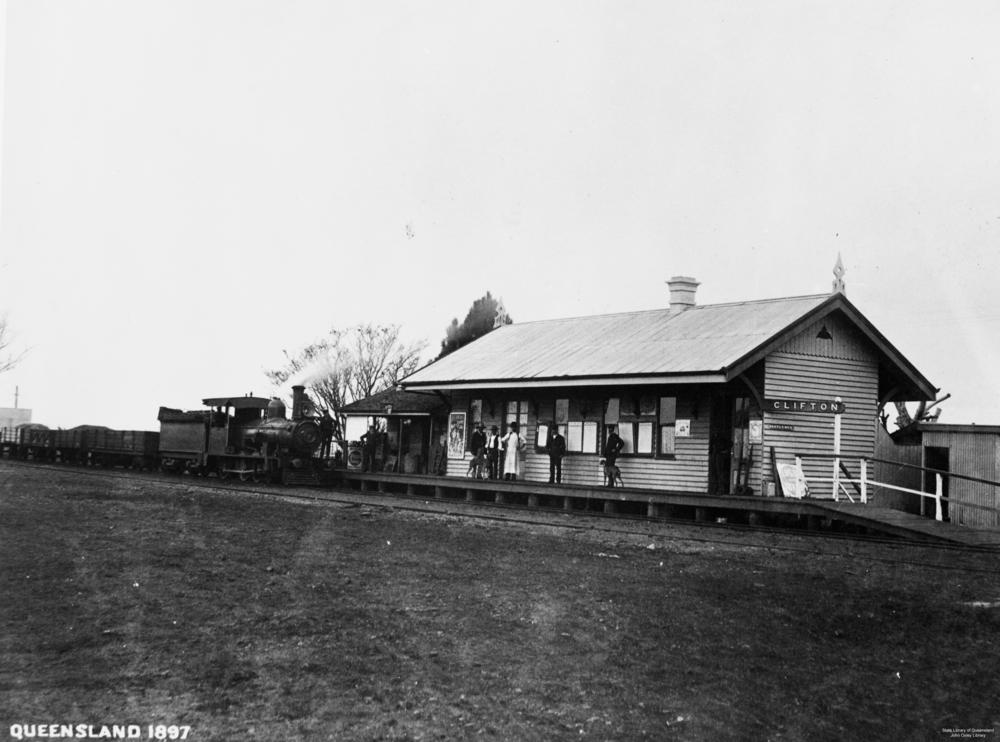
Clifton railway station in 1897

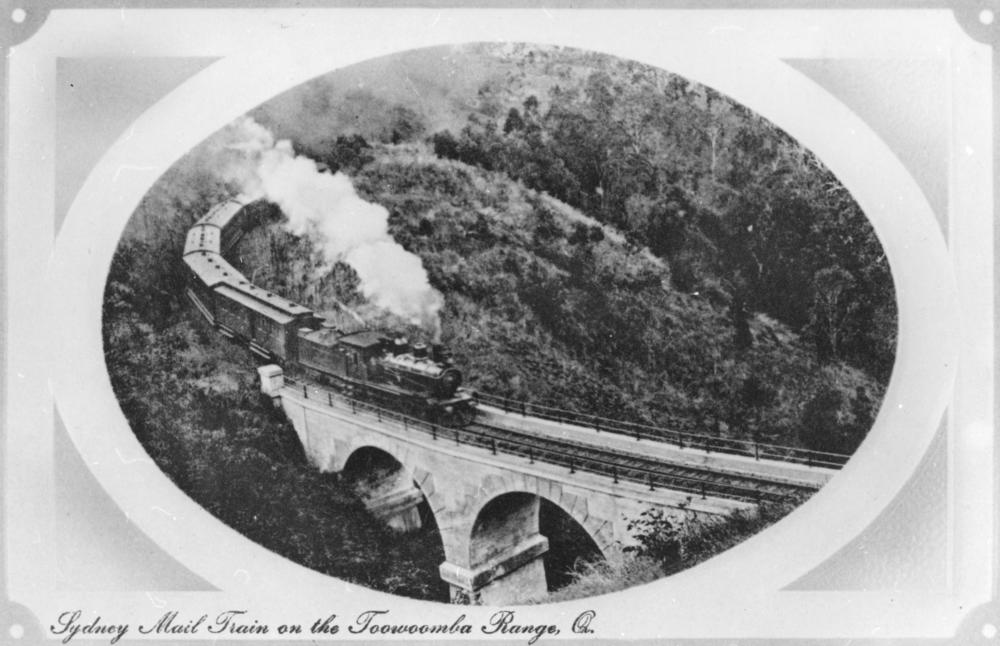
Sydney Mail circa 1910

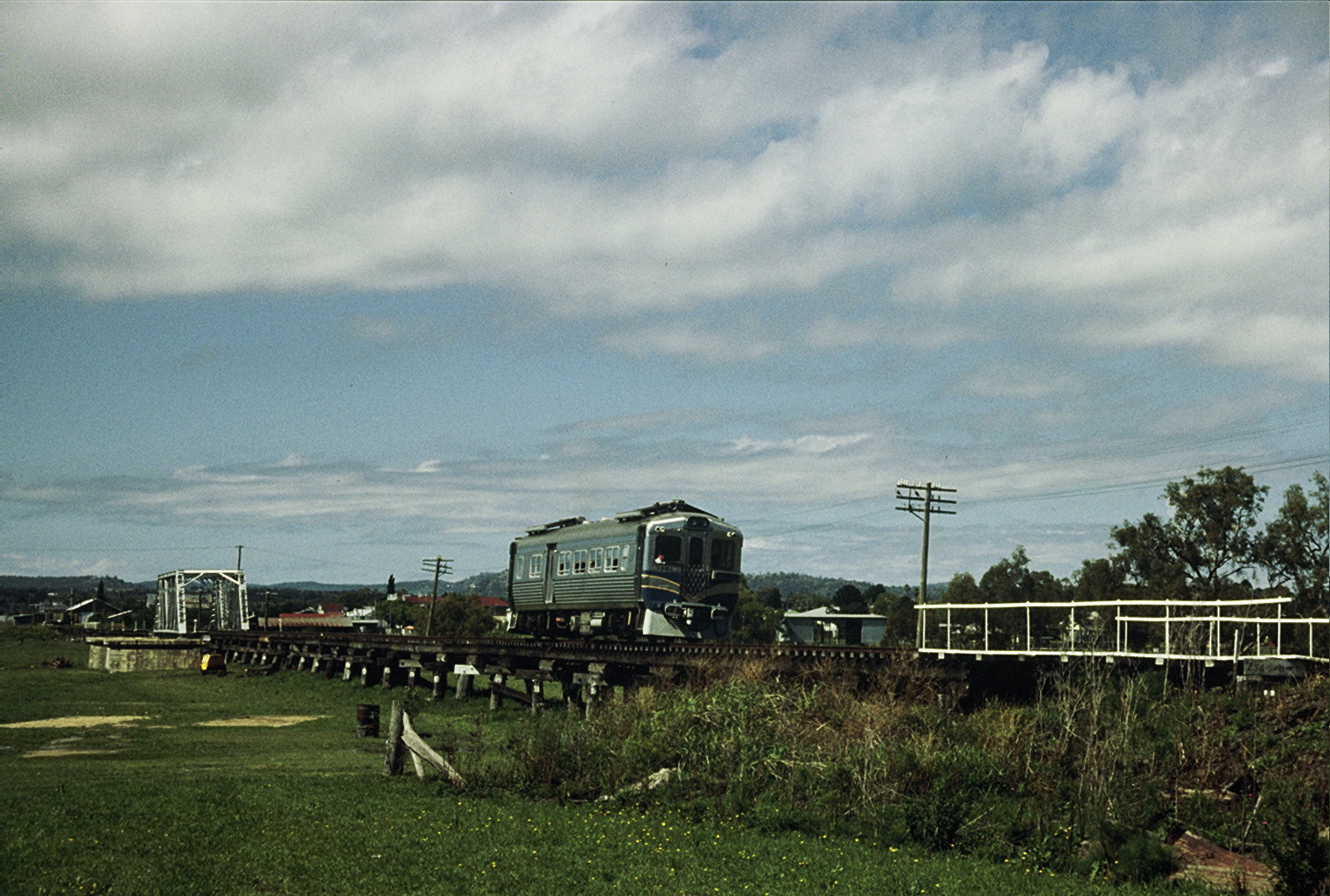
1901 crosses the Condamine River floodplain trestles on approach to Warwick station in 1987

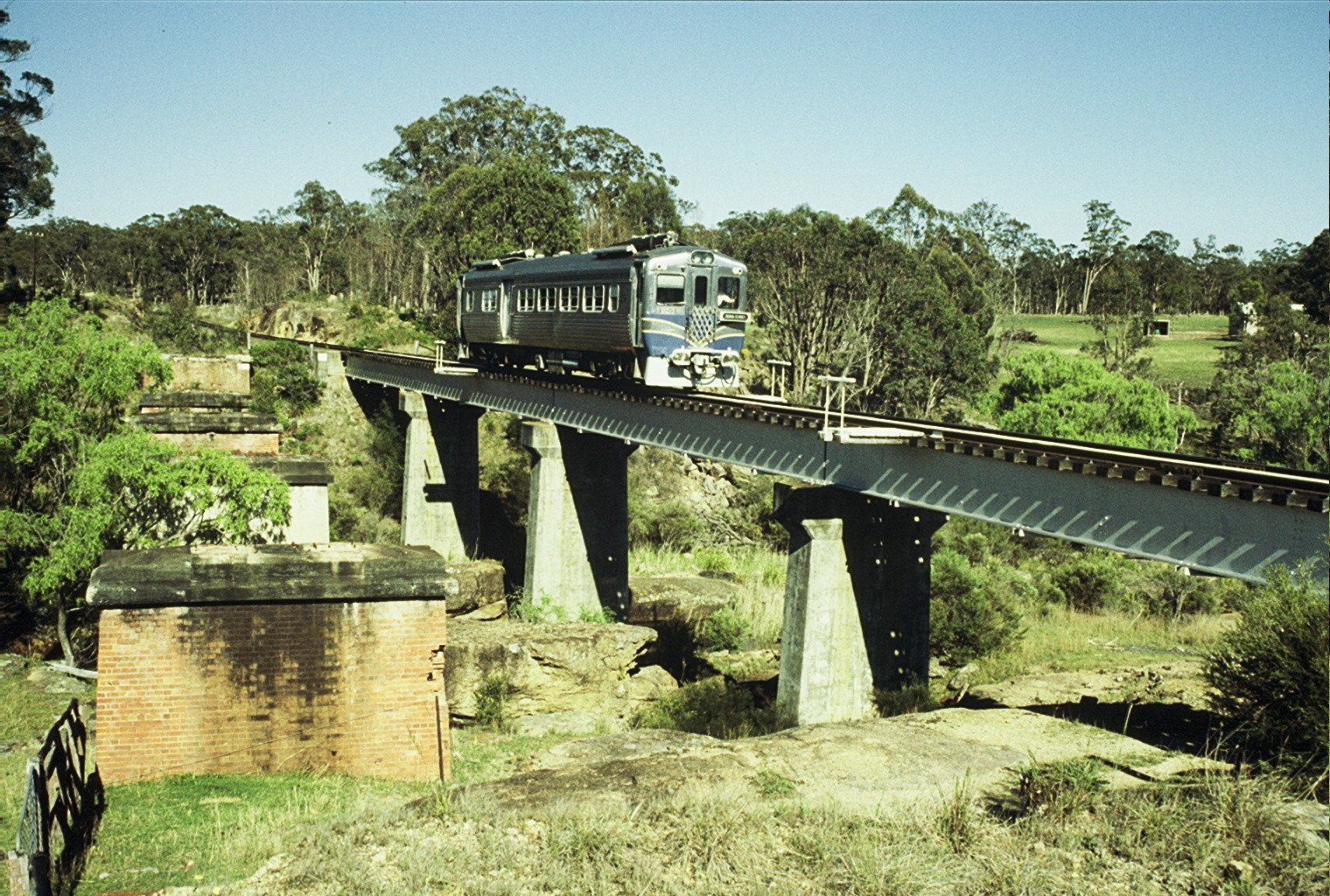
1901 south of Warwick in 1987

The first section of the Southern railway opened from the end of the Main Line railway at Toowoomba to Millhill to the north of Warwick, on 9 January 1871, the line terminating there to save the cost of a bridge over the Condamine River.

In 1872, tin was discovered at Stanthorpe, but disagreement over the route to be taken through Warwick resulted in the approval to extend the line not being given until 1877. The difficult terrain south of Warwick required two tunnels, one through solid rock, which took two years to excavate, and the line opened to Stanthorpe on 3 May 1881. The Dalveen Tunnel was added to the Queensland Heritage Register on 28 July 2000.

The Southern line was completed to Wallangarra on 14 February 1887. The first passenger trains between Brisbane and Sydney ran on 16 January 1888, when the New South Wales Main Northern line opened. Trains operated via Gowrie Junction on the Western line until 1915 when the Drayton Deviation opened, shaving 30 minutes off journey times.

As all trains from Brisbane to Warwick and beyond had to travel via Toowoomba, a proposal to provide a direct line to Warwick, known as the Via Recta, was developed. That would have involved another crossing of the Main Range through Spicers Gap, involving a spiral loop with uncompensated 1-in-33 grades and 100 m (328 ft) radius curves, giving a ruling grade equivalent of 1 in 27. The Via Recta proposal would have involved very significant construction costs, and once it was agreed to extend the standard gauge line from Casino to South Brisbane, the need for the Via Recta disappeared.

In 1904, the South Western railway line was opened. It left the Southern railway just south of Warwick station to initially reach Thane and then Dirranbandi more than 400 km to the west.

In December 1910 the Roessler railway station was established at the 200 miles (320 km) point between Thulimbah and Stanthorpe. It was named after a pioneer fruitgrower in the district. In September 1916 it was renamed Applethorpe railway station due to anti-German sentiment during World War I.

Prior to the completion of the New South Wales North Coast line in 1930, the Southern line formed part of the main interstate rail link between Brisbane and Sydney via the New South Wales Main Northern line. The railway systems of the two states use different gauges, Queensland uses 3 ft 6 in (1,067 mm) while New South Wales uses 4 ft 8 1/2 in (1,435 mm) standard gauge. This necessitated a break of gauge at Wallangarra with the station consisting of an island platform, with Queensland Railways using the west side and the New South Wales Government Railways the east. The state border traverses the station platform at its southern end.

A triangle was located to the north of the station to allow locomotives to be turned. The last train to operate on the New South Wales line ran in January 1988. There were various proposals to transfer the New South Wales line to Armidale to Queensland Rail but nothing ever eventuated.

Queensland Rail ceased freight services to Wallangarra in March 2007. The Australian Railway Historical Society operated a twice yearly service to Wallangarra as The Winelander. It last ran in February 2014 before the withdrawal of the Lander carriage stock.

The entire length of the line was maintained by Queensland Rail, until 2023 when bushfires impacted the railway line. As a result, the line was reopened only from Warwick to Stanthorpe with the remainder of the line to Wallangarra remaining closed. In 2024, the Queensland Government announced that, as the cost of the repairing the line from Stanthorpe to Wallangarra would be $20 million, the line from Stanthorpe to Wallangarra would to be permanently closed instead of repaired. In February 2025, the line was reopened to Ballandean following the introduction of a turning facility there.

== Branch lines ==
- Wyreema–Millmerran 70 km, opened to Pittsworth in 1887, extended to Millmerran 1911
- Hendon–Goomburra 19 km, opened to Allora in 1897, extended to Goomburra 1912, latter closed in 1961, the Allora section in 1993, Allora station layout required trains to reverse when traveling to/from Goomburra
- Warwick–Maryvale 30 km, opened 1911, closed 1960, built as the first section of the abandoned Via Recta
- Warwick–Killarney 44 km, opened 1884–85, closed 1964, 5 km tramway was built from Tannymorel to Mount Colliery by Glengallen Shire Council to serve a coal mine using rollingstock hired from QR, It also closed in 1964
- Cottonvale–Amiens 20 km, opened 1920, closed 1974

== Services ==
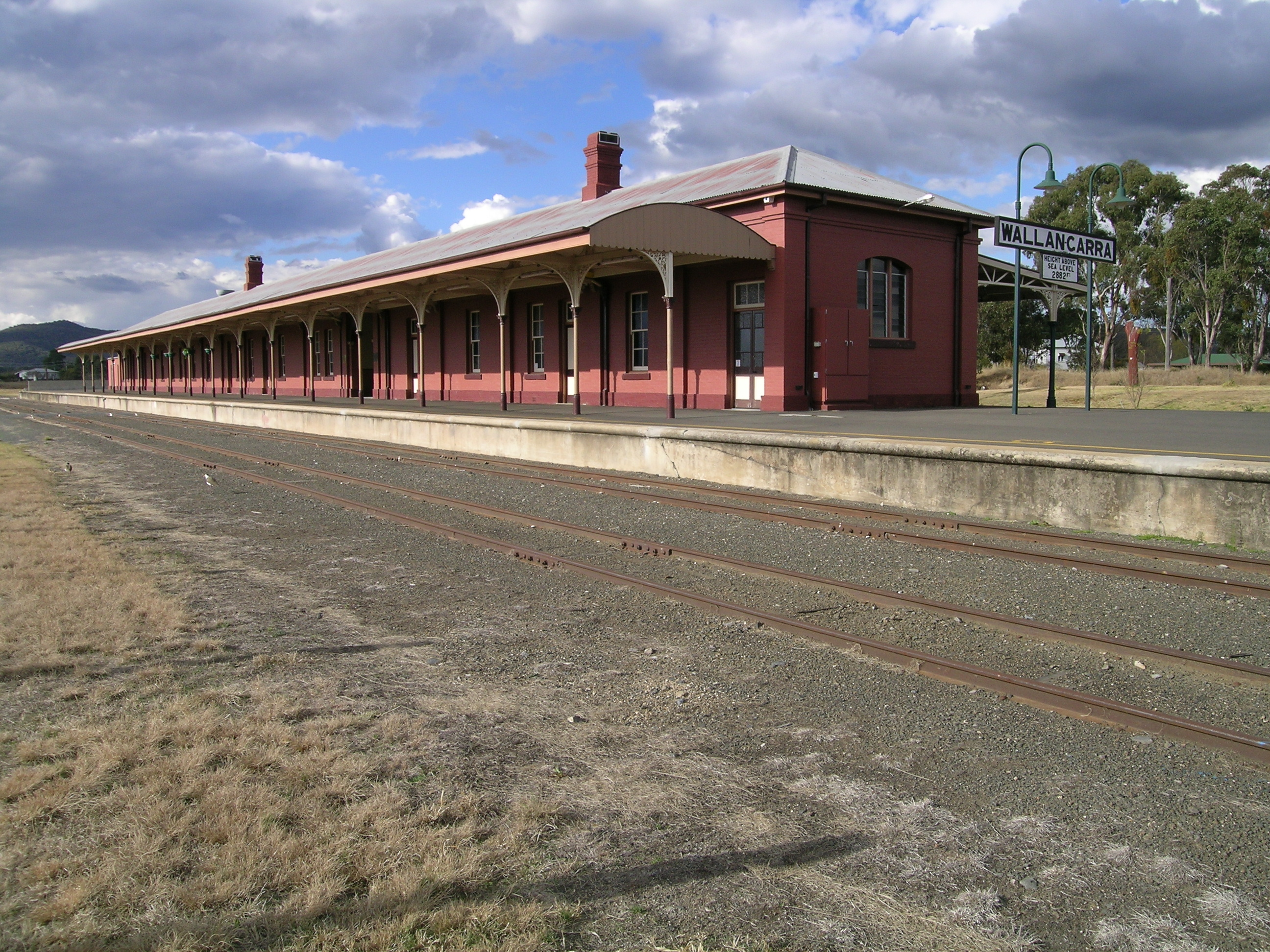
Wallangarra station in May 2008

In January 1888, the Sydney Mail was introduced, when first class sleeping cars were added to the Wallangarra train (Second class sleeping cars were introduced in 1896). A daily service was provided, departing Brisbane at 19:00, pausing at Toowoomba at 00:30 and arriving at Wallangarra at 07:45. The return service departed Wallangarra at 17:00, pausing at Toowoomba at 00:45 and arriving in Brisbane at 06:15. At Wallangarra passengers transferred to the New South Wales Government Railways' Brisbane Limited.

A travelling post office was added to the Warwick train in 1877, and extended to Stanthorpe, and then Wallangarra as the line was extended. This was removed from the train in 1932 as a cost saving measure.

In 1908, the Sydney Mail departed Brisbane at 07:10, calling at Toowoomba at 11:10 and after changing trains at Wallangarra, passengers arrived in Sydney at 11:10 the following day. The return service departed Sydney at 17:10, arriving in Brisbane at 21:10 the following day. Carriage connections were introduced in 1908, with a Parlour Car introduced in 1923, and a Buffet Car in 1924. The Parlour Car was transferred to the Townsville Mail in 1930 following the opening of the Standard Gauge line to Brisbane.

Foot-warmers were introduced to the first class compartments of the Sydney Mail in 1911, and provided each winter until 1958.

In 1947, the four Mail Trains per week was reduced to two per week, and was withdrawn on 1 February 1972.

The last passenger on the line, the Dirranbandi Mail that operated as far as Warwick, was withdrawn on 11 February 1993.

== Preservation ==
Downs Explorer (formerly the Southern Downs Steam Railway) is based in Warwick and operates steam trains on the line and other tourist services.

== See also ==
- Rail transport in Queensland
- Travelling post office, Queensland
- Quart Pot Creek Rail Bridge
