= Quart Pot Creek Rail Bridge =

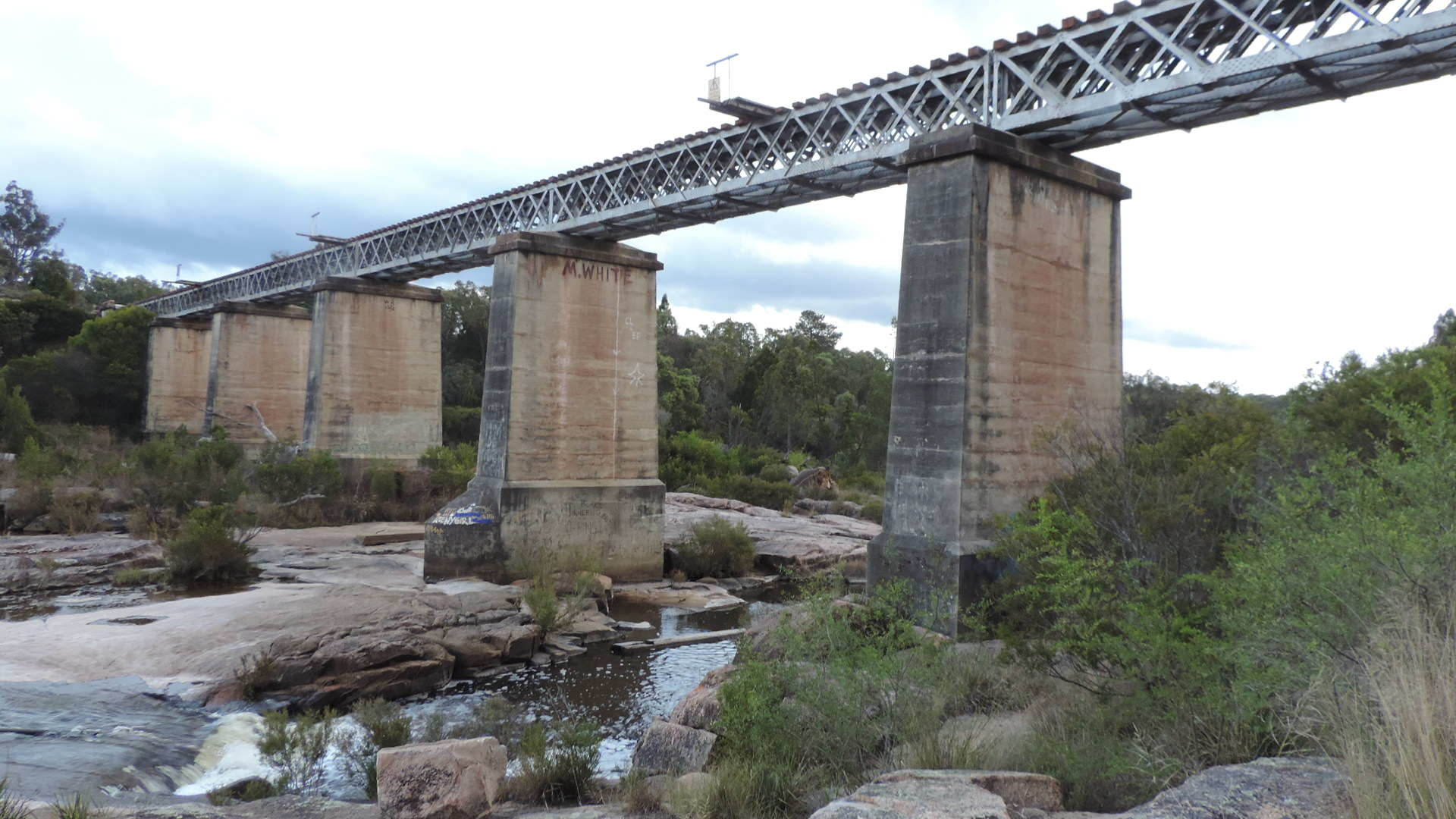
- Quart Pot Creek Rail Bridge, viewed from upstream, 2015

- Location within Queensland Location within Australia
- 28.6637°S 151.9414°E
- Location: Quart Pot Creek, Stanthorpe, Southern Downs Region, Queensland, Australia

History
- Design period: 1870s–1890s (late 19th century)
- Built: 1886

Queensland Heritage Register
- Official name: Quart Pot Creek Rail Bridge
- Type: state heritage (built)
- Designated: 21 October 1992
- Reference no.: 600829
- Significant period: 1880s (fabric)
- Significant components: abutments – railway bridge, pier/s (bridge)

Quart Pot Creek Rail Bridge is a heritage-listed railway bridge at Quart Pot Creek, Stanthorpe, Southern Downs Region, Queensland, Australia. It was built in 1886. It is also known as the Red Bridge. It was added to the Queensland Heritage Register on 21 October 1992.

== History ==
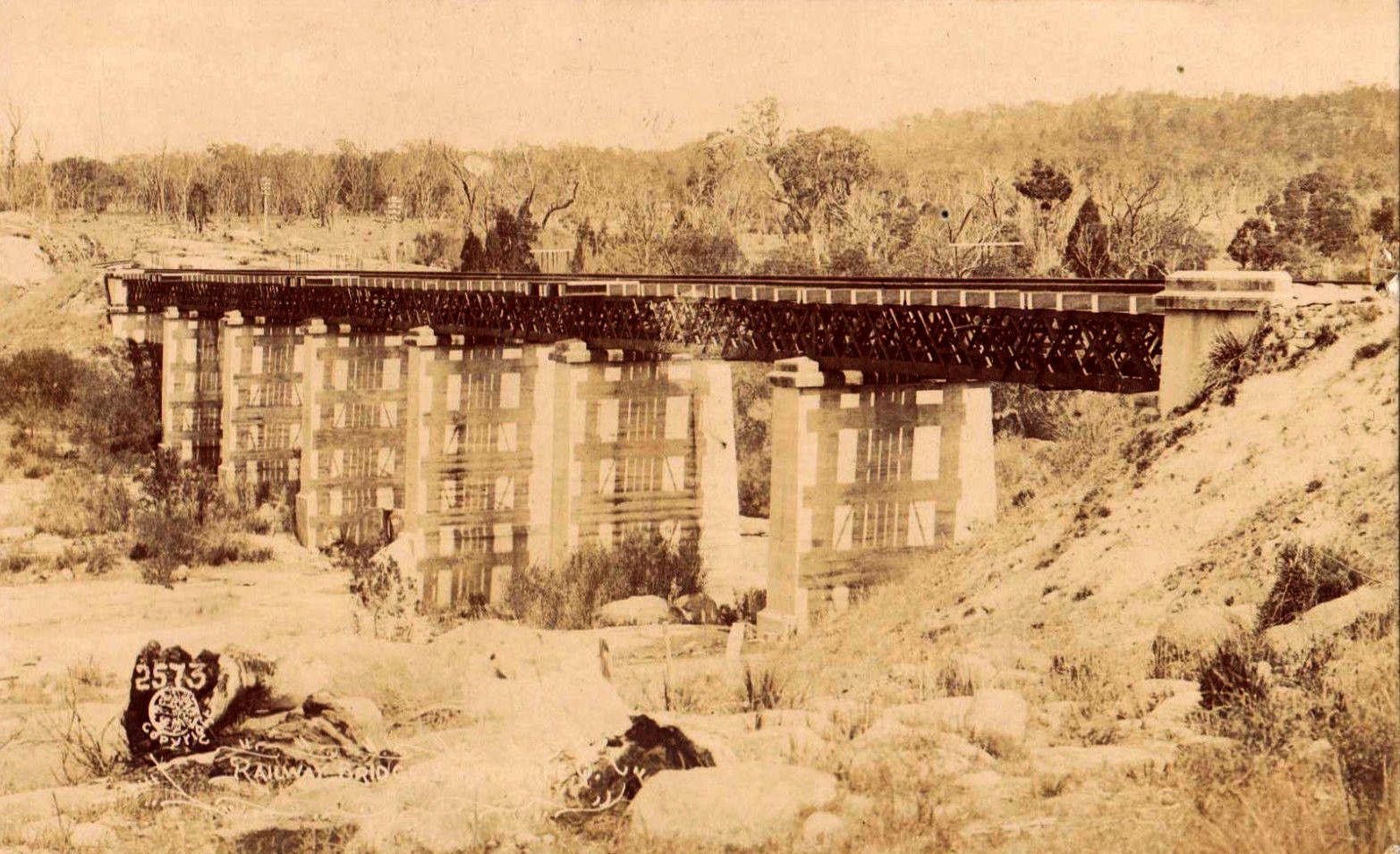
Quart Pot Creek rail bridge, very early 1900s

The Quart Pot Creek Rail Bridge was constructed in 1886 as part of the former Brisbane–Sydney interstate rail link.

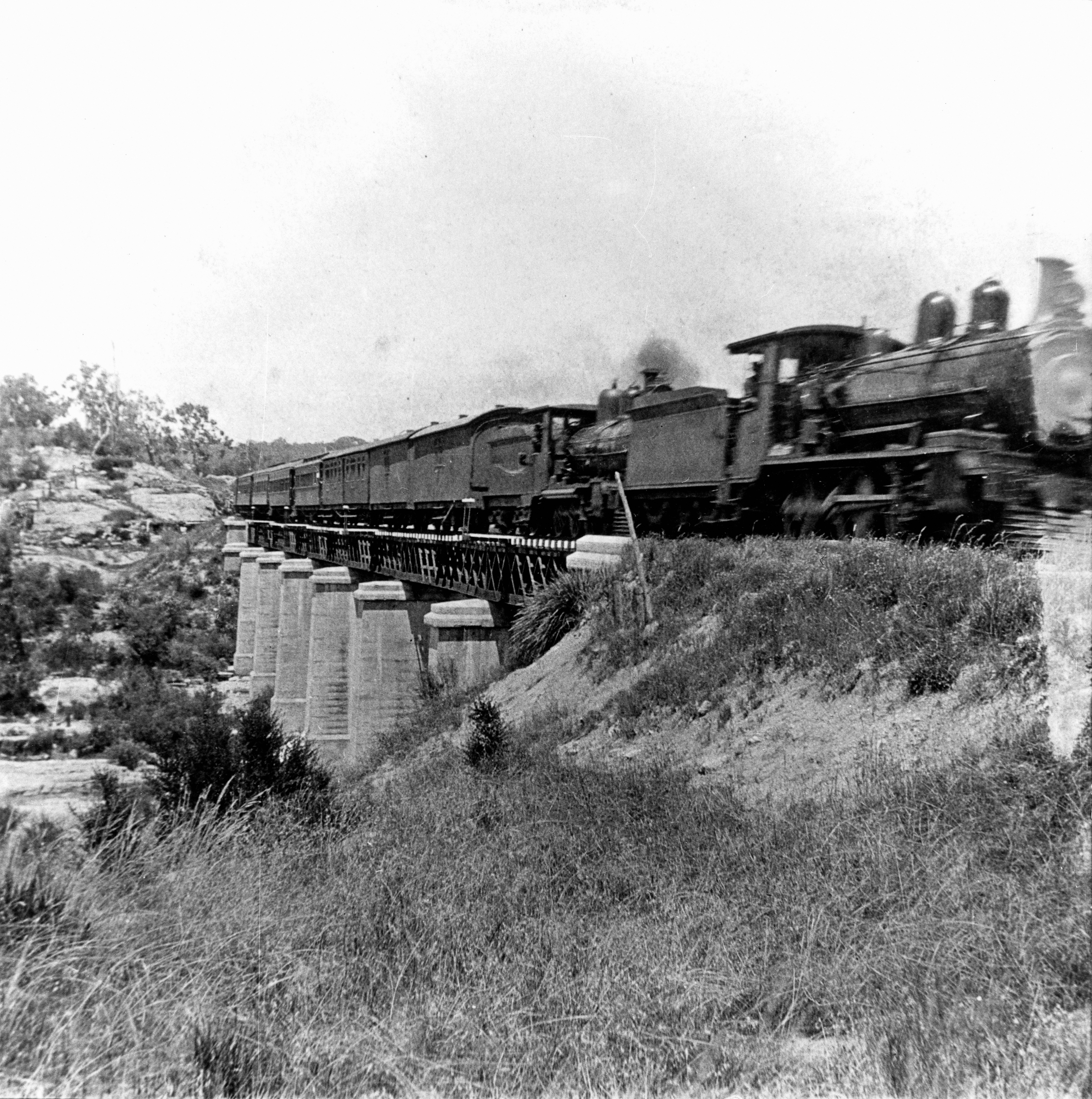
Steam train crossing the railway bridge at Quart Pot Creek Stanthorpe 1917

The major impetus to development in Stanthorpe occurred in 1872 with the start of the practice of alluvial tin mining after discoveries of the valuable metal in the area in the mid-1850s. Stanthorpe became the collective name for two townships ("Quart Pot Creek" and "Stannum") that grew as a result of the mining boom and became the only centre on the pastoral Darling Downs to develop with mining based revenue.

The Quart Pot Creek Rail Bridge forms part of the Southern railway line (Toowoomba–Warwick– Wallangarra). The line reached Warwick in 1871 and was extended to Stanthorpe to serve the tin industry in 1881. The railway was then extended to the border with New South Wales. The Quart Pot Creek Bridge was built as part of this extension. The original plans were drawn in 1880 and the contract plans were drawn up in 1884. The line opened for traffic between Stanthorpe and Wallangarra, the change of gauge border station, on 4 February 1887. Interstate rail services commenced on 16 January 1888, linking Brisbane with Sydney, Melbourne and Adelaide. Plans to strengthen the 50-foot (15 m) girder spans had first been drawn up in 1904 to permit the operation of heavier locomotives on the Sydney Mail and work began on the Warwick-Wallangarra section in 1910. The No.7 span was braced in 1913 to further accommodate 12-ton axle loads.

== Description ==
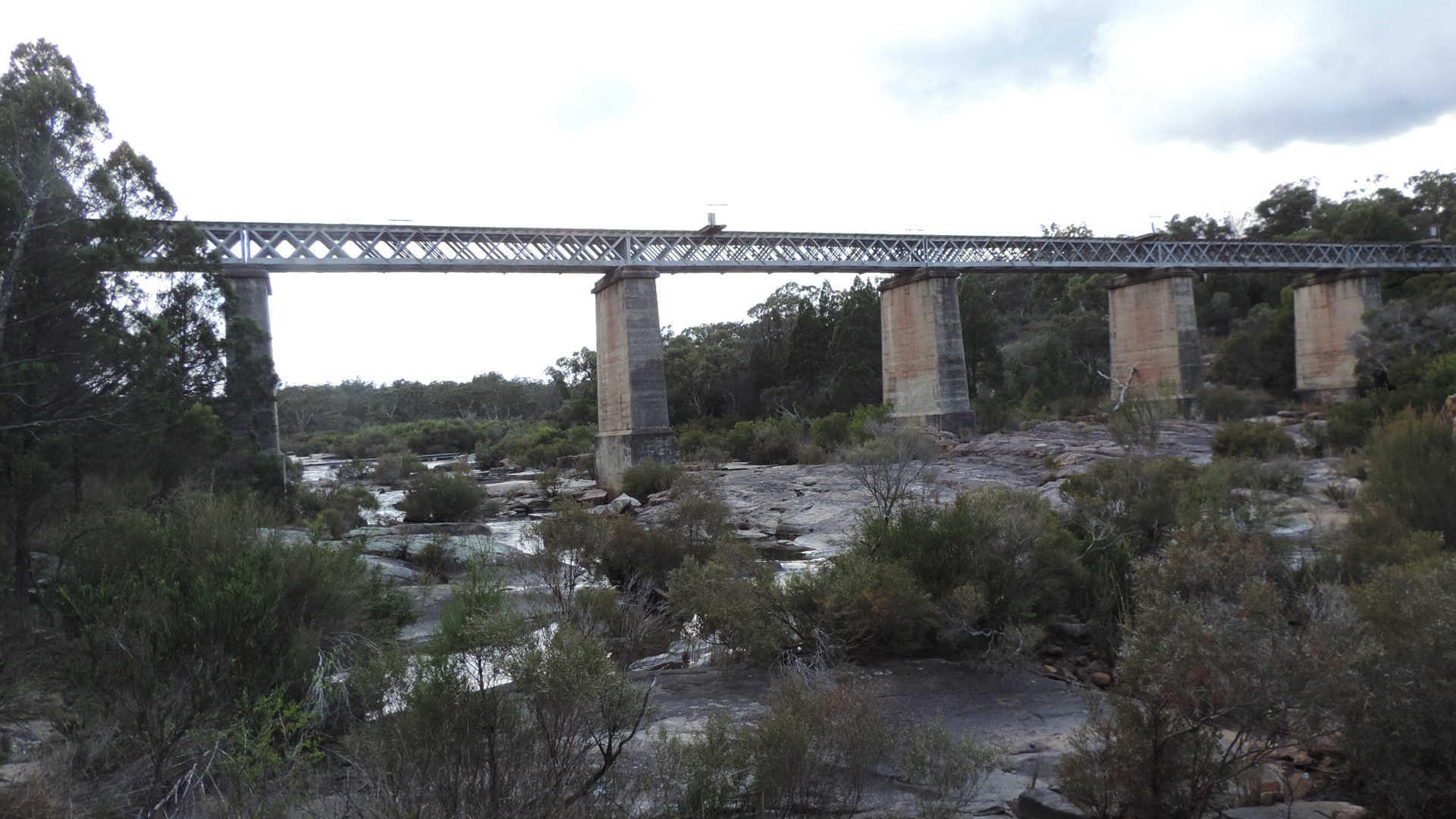
Quart Pot Creek Rail Bridge, viewed from downstream, 2015 01

The Quart Pot Creek Rail Bridge comprises 7 50-foot (15 m) spans of 3 rivetted deck type metal double lattice girders supported on six concrete piers and two abutments. It has a total length of 106.7 metres (350 ft). The centre girders, the pier tops and bedplates have been altered. The No.7 span has been braced. The bridge carries a single 1.07-metre (3 ft 6 in) gauge railway.

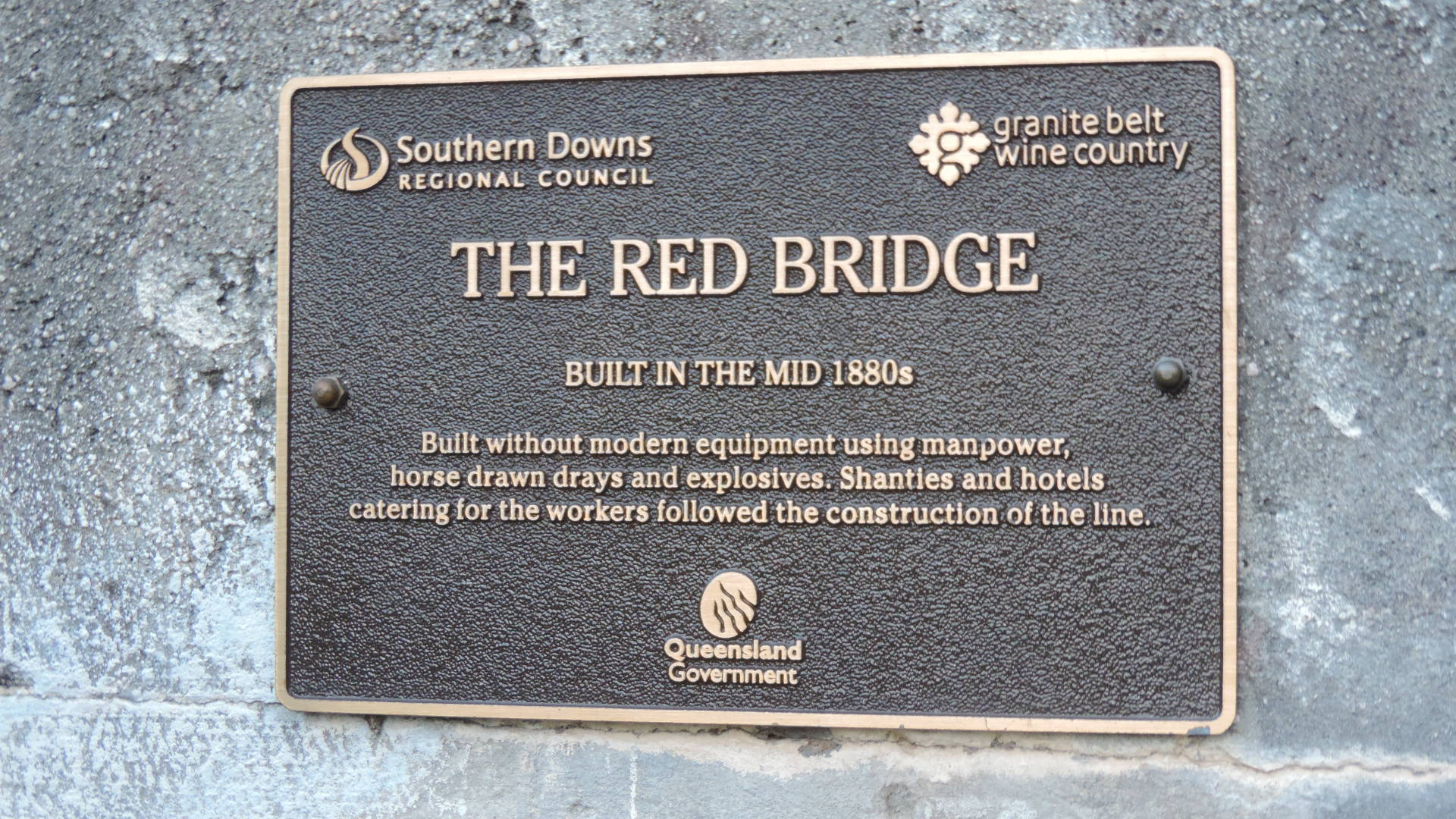
Plaque, Quart Pot Creek Rail Bridge, 2015

A plaque has been added to the bridge to outline its historical significance.

== Heritage listing ==
Quart Pot Creek Rail Bridge was listed on the Queensland Heritage Register on 21 October 1992 having satisfied the following criteria.

The place is important in demonstrating the evolution or pattern of Queensland's history.

The Quart Pot Creek Rail Bridge is an important part of what was formerly the interstate link between Brisbane and Sydney. It is the fourth oldest bridge of its type in Queensland.

The place is important in demonstrating a high degree of creative or technical achievement at a particular period.

The bridge demonstrates a robust engineering design, which has allowed it to be upgraded whilst retaining its essential character.
