= Ballandean railway station =

Former railway station in Queensland, Australia

Ballandean
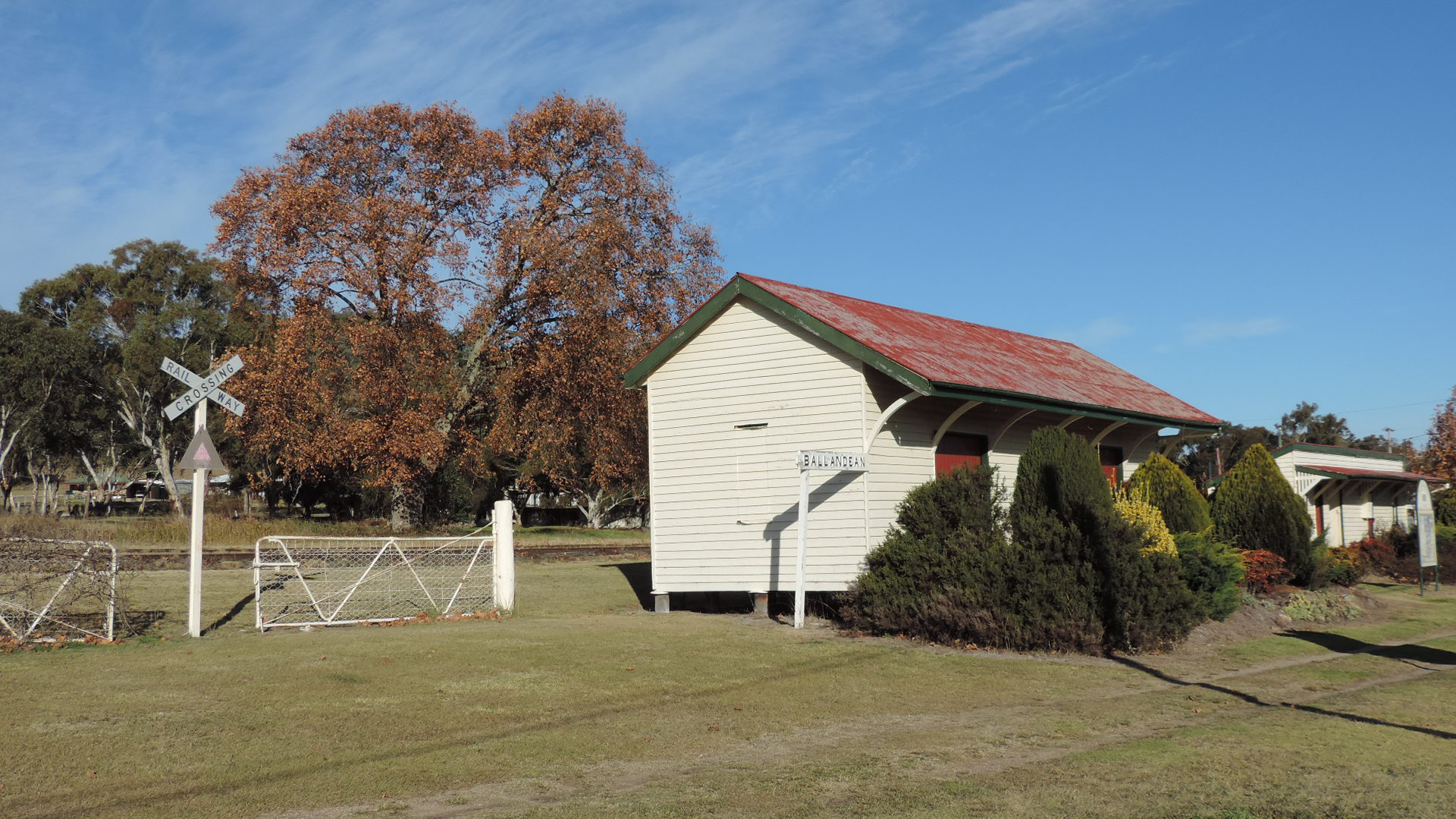
- Station building in June 2015

General information
- Location: New England Highway, Ballandean; Australia
- Coordinates: 28.7999°S 151.8429°E
- Owner: Queensland Rail
- Operator: Traveltrain
- Line: Southern
- Distance: 340 kilometres from Brisbane
- Platforms: 1
- Tracks: 1

Construction
- Structure type: Ground

Other information
- Status: Closed
Location

Ballandean railway station is located on the Southern line in Queensland, Australia. It services the town of Ballandean, a rural district in the Granite Belt.

== Big Dinosaur ==
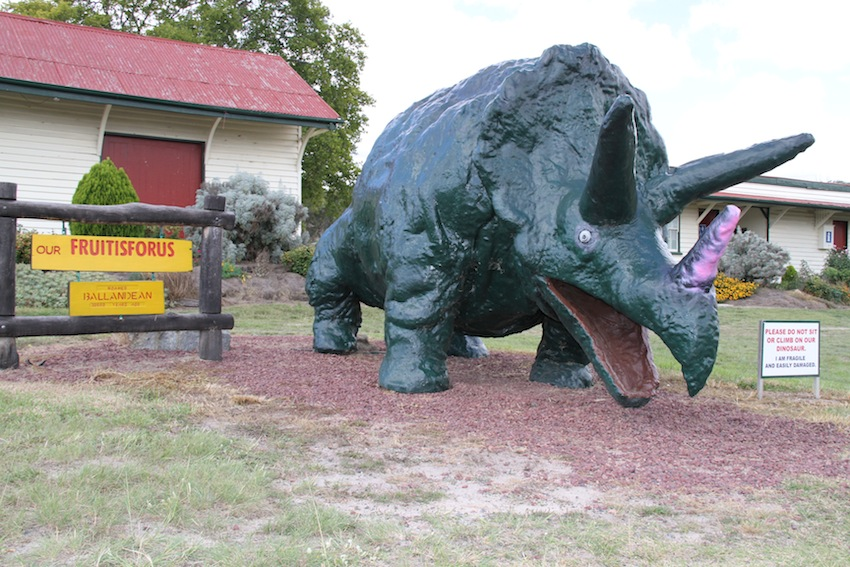
Ballanden railway station with Fruitisforus beside the New England Highway, 2015

The station is a well-known landmark on the New England Highway due to the big dinosaur in front of it, nicknamed the Fruitisforus (Fruit-is-for-us). The dinosaur was originally constructed for a float in the 1998 Apple and Grape Festival. After the festival, the community placed it in front of the railway station to get passing traffic to stop and buy fruit for a community fundraiser. It proved so popular that it was reinforced with fibregrass and painted and made a permanent roadside feature. It is 6.7 metres (22 ft) long and 2.1 metres (6 ft 11 in) high.
