= Strategic Defence and Security Review =

The Strategic Defence and Security Review (SDSR) refers to two of the defence strategy policy reviews of the United Kingdom:

- Strategic Defence and Security Review 2010
- Strategic Defence and Security Review 2015
