= Downs Explorer =

- Established: 1996
- Location: Warwick
- Coordinates: 28.216°S 152.042°E
- Type: Railway museum
- Website: downsexplorer.org.au

External videos
- Southern Downs Steam Railway – Warwick to Stanthorpe

Downs Explorer (originally known as Southern Downs Steam Railway) was founded in 1996, initially to restore the former Queensland Railways locomotive depot in Warwick.

In 2000, a C17 class steam locomotive was purchased and restored to operational condition with passenger operations commencing in January 2009.

The museum regularly operates services on the Southern line from Warwick to Toowoomba and Wallangarra. It is an all-volunteer railway.

== See also ==
- List of heritage railways in Australia
