= Warwick railway station, Queensland =

Warwick railway station
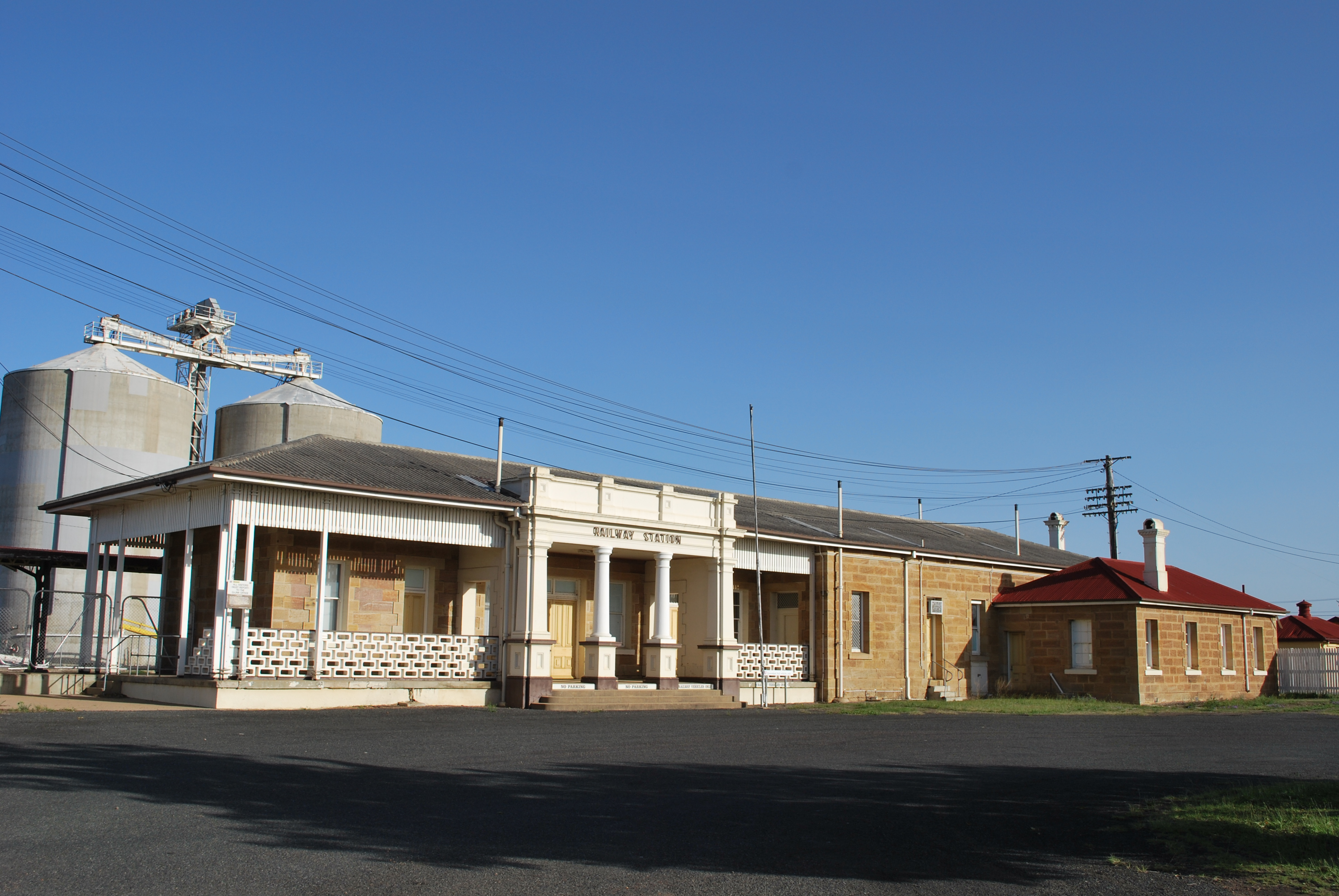
- Station front in 2008

- Location within Queensland
- 28.2174°S 152.0412°E
- Location: Lyons Street, Warwick, Southern Downs Region, Queensland, Australia

History
- Design period: 1870s–1890s (late 19th century)
- Built: c. 1881–1910s

Site notes
- Owner: Queensland Rail

Queensland Heritage Register
- Official name: Warwick Railway Complex
- Type: state heritage (built)
- Designated: 24 September 1999
- Reference no.: 600955
- Significant period: 1880s–1950s (historical); 1880s–ongoing (social)
- Significant components: memorial – honour board/ roll of honour, platform, track, kitchen/kitchen house, residential accommodation – workers' quarters, yards – livestock, platform canopies/awnings (railway), railway siding, shed – goods, residential accommodation – station master's house/quarters, yards – sale, residential accommodation – inspector's house/quarters, railway station, shed/s, institute – railway, garden/grounds

Warwick railway station is a heritage-listed railway station on the Southern railway line in Warwick, Southern Downs Region, Queensland, Australia. It was built from c. 1881 to 1910s. It was added to the Queensland Heritage Register on 24 September 1999.

== History ==
Warwick railway station is an amalgam of buildings dating from the mid-1880s, when this site became the principal railway station in Warwick. The buildings include a sandstone goods shed and passenger station, a turntable, various staff dwelling and recreational buildings, warehouses and a goods sale yard complex.

Warwick was established as an administrative centre of the emerging Darling Downs regions in 1847, with a post office being established in the town in 1848. This year saw the first survey work of the embryonic town completed by surveyor, James Charles Burnett, with further surveys in 1850, and the first sale of crown land in July 1850. On 24 May 1861, Warwick was granted the status of a municipality (the Borough of Warwick), and discussions were held soon after concerning the introduction of the railway which was in primary stages of planning in Queensland.

The first rail line in Queensland, between Bigge's Camp (later Grandchester) and Ipswich, opened in 1865, and it was always the intention of the early Queensland Government to extend the line to provide the pastoral land to the west of Ipswich with a rail link. The line extended to Toowoomba in 1867. In February 1866, a contract was let for the extension of the railway line from Toowoomba to Warwick.

This contract was awarded to David Williams of Muswellbrook for £267,566. But with the financial problems of 1866 the first section of this extension, from Toowoomba to Allora was not opened until March 1869 and from there an extension to Warwick was completed for the grand opening attended by the Acting Governor on 10 January 1871.

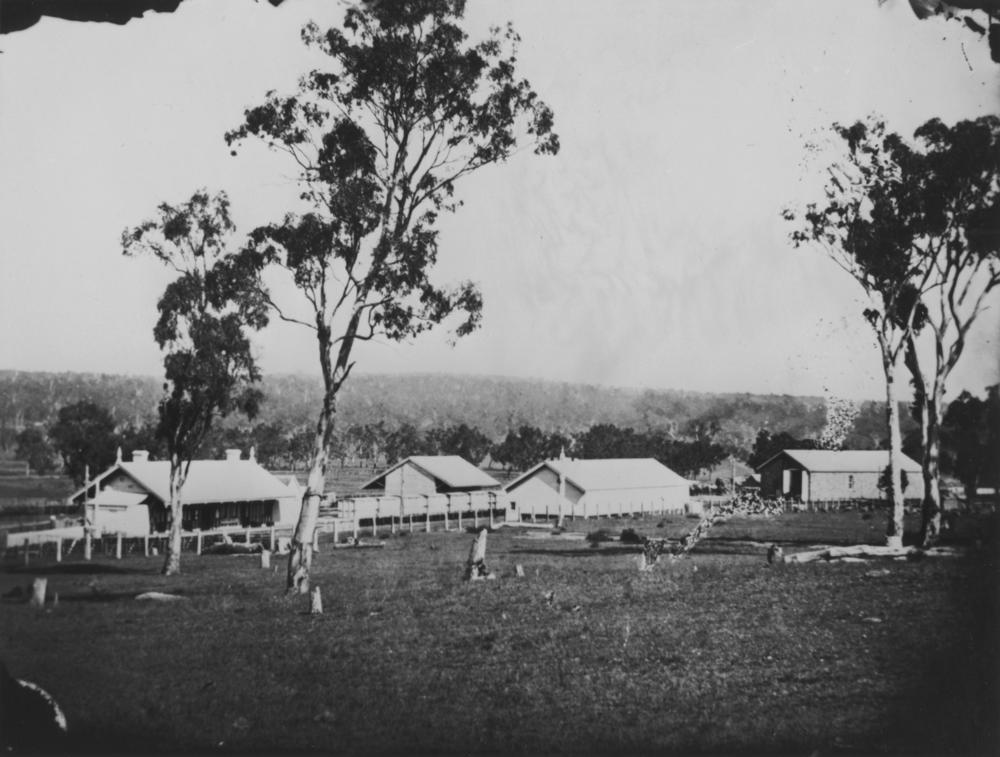
Railway buildings and Mill Hill Station at Warwick circa 1875

One of the principal forces shaping the government's construction of the line from Toowoomba to Warwick was the minimising the cost involved, and hence, the cheapest possible route was chosen. This explains why the location of the first terminus at Warwick was chosen to the north of the town and thereby not requiring a bridge over the Condamine River. This initial terminus, known later as Mill Hill, was furnished with a stone goods' shed and timber station building, but was only a temporary facility as the location of the Warwick terminus was resited when plans for extension of the railway line were realised.

The discovery of tin at Stanthorpe prompted the government to make surveys for extending the train line from Warwick to Stanthorpe in 1873. This extension made necessary the construction of a bridge across the Condamine River and therefore another railway station was established closer to the settlement although both stations continued for some time simultaneously. In 1885 this second station became the main terminal station at Warwick and has remains so to this day. The extension of railway was opened on 3 May 3, 1881 at which time a platform and closets were erected. A shelter shed was erected on the site in 1882.

The station was known as the East Warwick railway station until 1885. A plan was instigated in that year for the redevelopment of the newly deemed terminal station, which was fortunate as the former station buildings on the site were destroyed by fire on 10 August 1887 just as the redevelopment plan was nearing completion. This redevelopment was spurred by the planned extension of the line to the New South Wales border at Wallangarra, agreed to by the Queensland Parliament in August 1884. Warwick was planned as a major station on this route.

Tenders were called on 22 June 1886 for the construction of a passenger station and goods shed at the new Warwick terminal station. The contract for the goods shed was let to MT O'Brien for £2,710 and for the passenger station to R Godsall and others for £5,624. A 40-foot (12 m) turntable was also planned for Warwick at this time. These were the second set of tenders called for the station buildings as the previous tenderers were all too high.

A report in the Warwick Examiner and Times published on October 12, 1887, describes the progress on the redevelopment plan of the site. Implicit in this report was the frustration felt by the local Warwick community over the lack of official commitment to the project, supposedly manifest in the "passable appearance" of the passenger station, the prolonged time taken for the tendering process and the lack of funding available. This perceived lack of support was thought to reflect the Queensland Government's uncaring disposition toward Warwick at the time. The article does not mention an architect, but does say "the architecture (of the passenger station) is not of a very elaborate character, and is said by connoisseurs not to be of a particular order, being a "homologation" of various orders, such as flitted across the mind of the draftsman when preparing the plans."

Whilst thus dismissed the passenger station constructed was a substantial single storeyed stone building, with rendered brick portico of classical derivation. A stone kitchen was built adjacent to the station building. An early description of the passenger station describes verandah awnings attached to the eastern side of the building which provide shelter over the platforms. The awnings were supported on cast iron columns on stone bases and with cast iron brackets from the top. This awning was replaced in September 1934 when the extant steel cantilevered awnings were constructed. According to early photographs of the building, the roof of the passenger station was originally covered with a both rolled iron sections and corrugated iron sections.

J McCulloch, the prominent Warwick stonemason responsible for St Mark's and St Andrew's Churches, the convent, the courthouse, town hall and central school, superintended the stonework construction of the station.

Another major part of the redevelopment plan was for a goods' shed, which had been finished for "some time" when the Examiner and Times reported on the progress of the site in October 1887. According to this report a carriage shed, engine shed and station master's residence had been planned but were not yet erected on the site. Local contractors, Campbell and Thompson were awarded the contract for the station master's residence on 31 July 1888, and this was constructed at the southern end of the railway site.

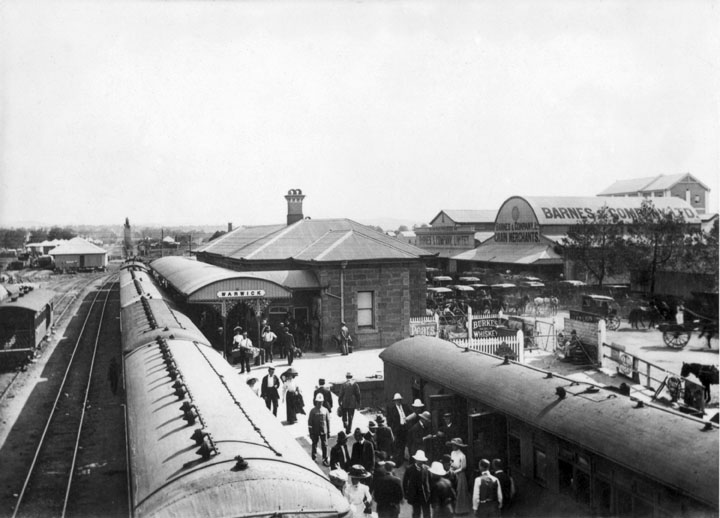
Passengers on the platform at Warwick station, circa 1905

By 1900 a timber footbridge had been constructed off Grafton Street to plans of the Railways Section of the Works Department. This was planned to minimise the risk of people living on the eastern side of the railway complex, crossing the tracks. The Tighe brothers were awarded the contract, and the bridge which was lit with lamps, was built at a cost of £209/16/-.

During the first few years of the 1910s major redevelopment of the station was planned and the whole site was re-organised. The timber footbridge of 1900 was replaced with a steel framed structure with timber decking. The timber decking was replaced with steel mesh decking in 1932. Further extensions of the 1910s included the May 1912 replacement of a 40-foot (12 m) turntable on the northern end of the site with a 58-foot (18 m) model, to accommodate larger locomotives. Various alterations were made to the passenger station, these involved the addition of a refreshment room on the south end of the building joining the kitchen block to the station. Several residences were erected on the eastern boundary of the site, as well as various railway community buildings including the timber building used for crews' sleeping quarters. A timber extension of the Goods Shed used for offices, was extended again by July 1912. Plans were made for the erection of a semi-circular locomotive shed or part round-house in 1912. In 1921 a coal stage was added to the site.

A legendary event of 1917 at the station catapulted the site to national significance when an egg was thrown at Prime Minister Billy Hughes knocking off his hat whilst he was visiting Warwick during the conscription referendum. Hughes demanded that the local police constable (a member of the Queensland Police Service) arrest the man who throw the egg to which the constable replied "you have no jurisdiction". This incident led to the establishment of the Commonwealth Police.

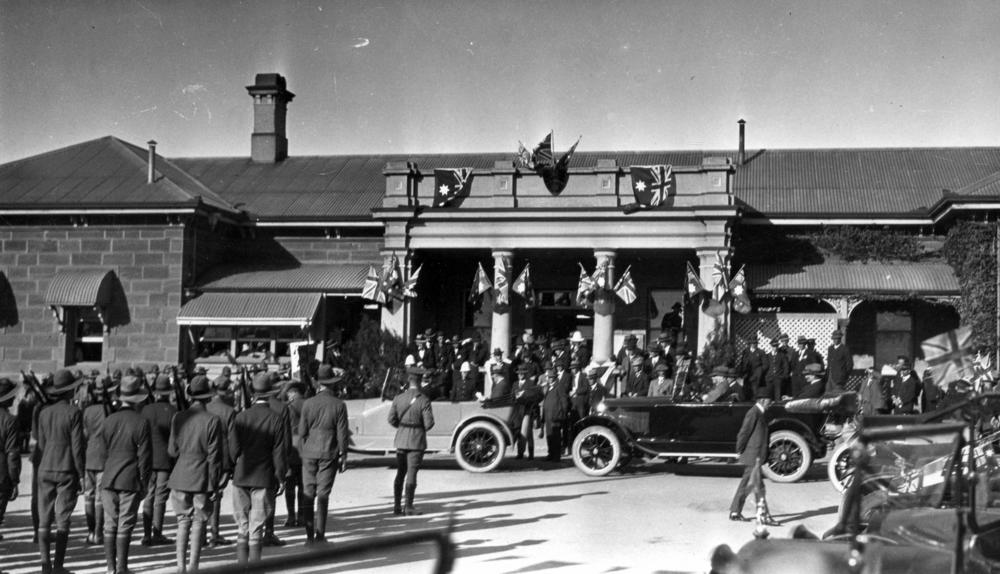
The visit from His Royal Highness, Edward VIII, Prince of Wales in 1920

In 1920, the Prince of Wales (later Edward VIII) visited Warwick by train, where he inspected the local Boy Scouts at the railway station before travelling by car to the rotunda in Leslie Park.

A c. 1940s photograph of the site shows extensive gardens on the west side of the passenger station, adjacent to the entrance, extending from Grafton Street.

From the 1960s the importance of the Warwick station diminished, with increased road competition and the consequent reduction of railway traffic. The passenger service by train to Wallangarra was withdrawn in 1972 and to Dirranbandi in 1992. Warwick now operates solely as a freight station.

A fire spread through the passenger station in September 1963, destroying much of the interior of the building and damaging some external areas. A north end bay of the building was removed at this time and not replaced. The roof of the passenger station has been replaced. The station is today used by steam locomotive hauled tours operated by Downs Explorer (formerly the Southern Downs Steam Railway).

== Description ==
The Warwick station complex, bounded by Lyons, Hamilton, Fitzroy and Percy Streets, is located several blocks to the east of Palmerin Street, the main street of Warwick. It consists of a series of buildings scattered about the many branch lines and sidings: the stone Station building faces west along Grafton Street, with the footbridge providing a connection where Grafton Street once continued; to the north of the station building is the stone Goods Shed, the timber Sale Yards, and the Turntable; to the east, the cluster of Railway Institute Buildings, and the various quarters buildings fronting Hamilton Street; to the south is the former Barnes and Co. warehouse and the Wheat Shed fronting both Lyons Street and the railway lines; to the west is the driveway and garden; and to both the northern and southern ends of the block are concrete traffic underpasses below the railway lines.

=== Goods Shed ===
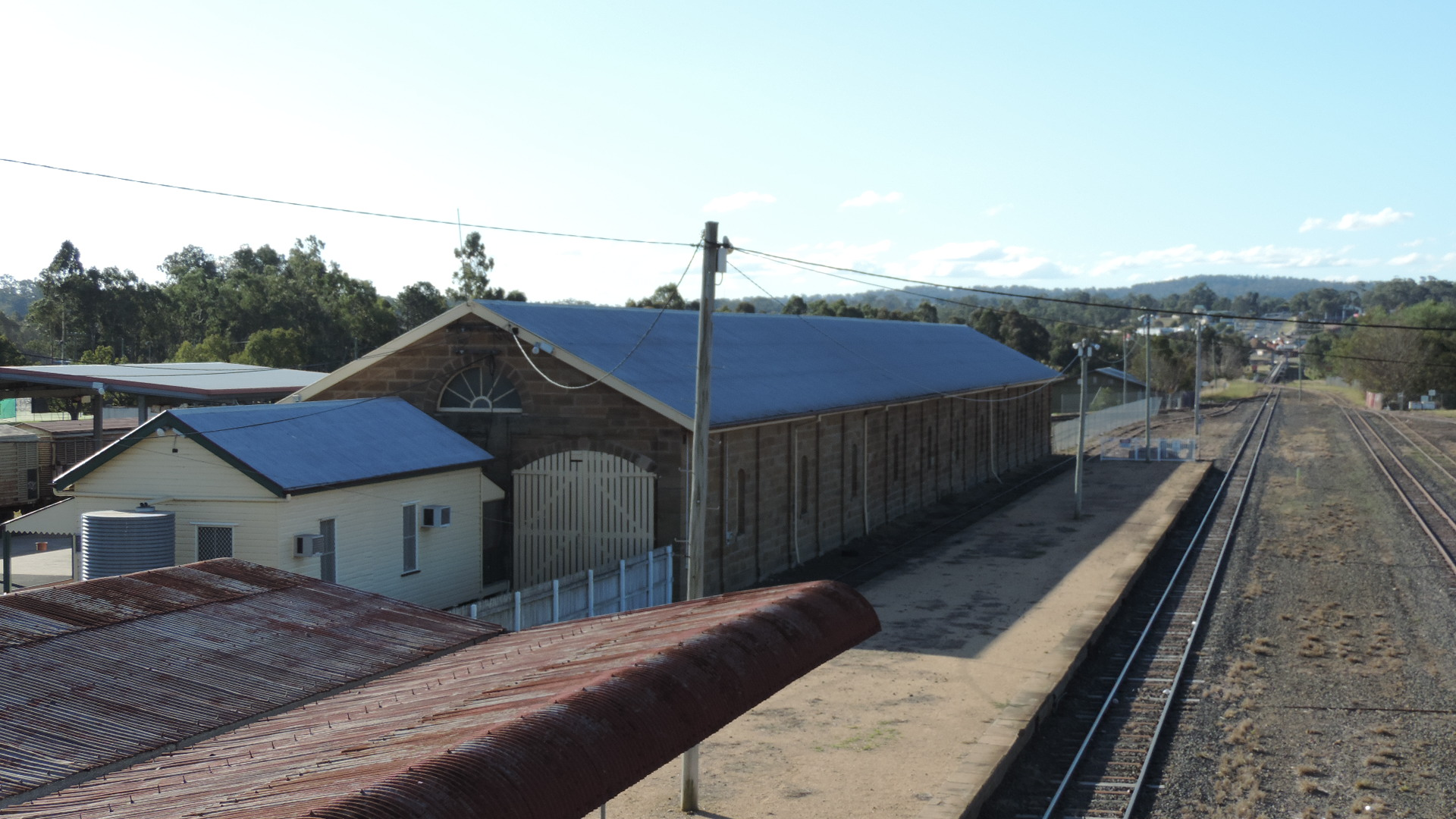
Goods shed, Warwick railway station, 2015

The Goods Shed is a single-storeyed sandstone building, situated to the north of the Station. A narrow linear building on a north–south axis, it measures some 70 metres (230 ft) in length by 11 metres (36 ft) in width. The gabled roof is of corrugated iron, with translucent skylight panels and a deep overhang on the western side protecting the loading bays. The stonework is of picked finish with draughted margins, laid as coursed ashlar. Added to the south of the building is a small timber office, and to the west is a recent steel canopy structure. Inside the building is a railway siding, with the remainder being a timber platform. The building is still in use as a goods shed.

The western side of the building is divided into bays by stone piers, with seven loading bay openings with arched heads scattered between. Beside these openings are timber bollards. The roof overhang is supported by curved timber brackets resting on stone corbels at the piers. The rafters, doubled at these brackets, have decorative fretted ends. There is an external timber platform at Doors 1 and 2, and at the northern end, and there is evidence there was previously one at Door 5. The east side of the building is also divided into bays by piers, with arch-headed fixed windows of eight panes at every second bay. The north and south ends have large battened gates giving entry to the internal siding, and lunette windows centred within the gable. Connected to the south end of the building is a timber office, with a posted verandah to its north and west sides, and a gabled corrugated iron roof. Enclosing this part of the complex is a perimeter fence of timber posts with a piece of upturned railway track as the rail.

The interior of the Goods Shed is substantially intact. The raised timber platform runs the full length, beside the internal siding. To the loading bay openings are substantial boarded and cross-braced sliding doors, and above are robust exposed timber roof trusses. Also within the building is the warehouse crane (by Dorman and Long) at Door 4, and the scales (by Henry Pooley and Sons) with checkers desk and cupboard. To the southwest corner are partitions enclosing a small office.

=== Passenger Station ===
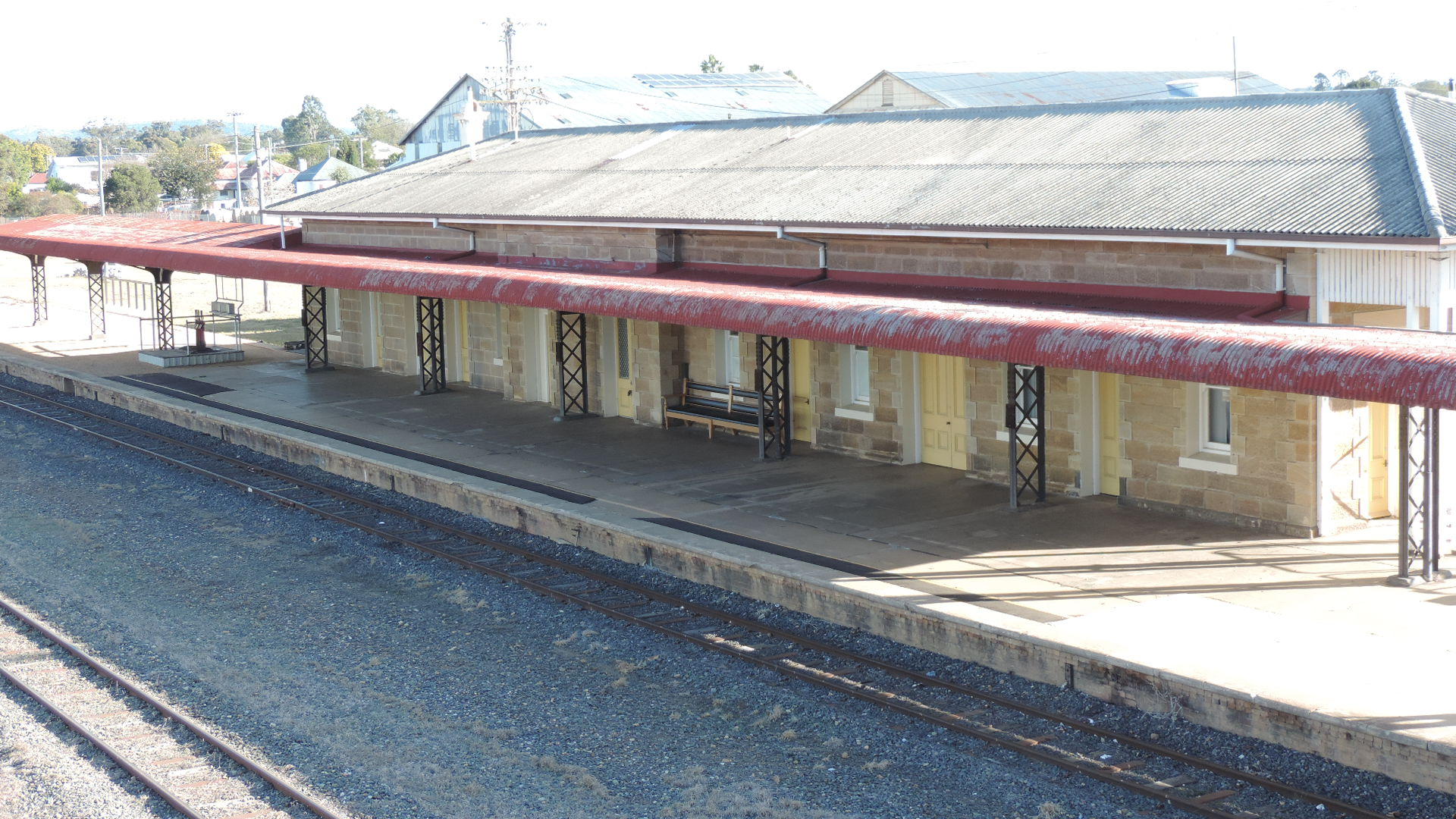
Passenger platform, 2015

The station building is also a single-storeyed sandstone building on a north–south axis, with the platform running along its eastern side. The western facade features an entrance portico and verandah. The roof is hipped and mainly of corrugated asbestos cement sheet, apart from the kitchen wing which is corrugated iron. Above the roof are two rendered chimneys with decorative mouldings and a cornice. There is a cantilevered steel awning over the platform, which continues past the Station building in both directions.

The rendered entrance portico has columns and pilasters of Tuscan order, mounted on pedestals. Above is a projecting cornice, then a simple parapet. To either side is a timber-framed verandah with a battened valance. The walls of the building are sandstone laid in ashlar coursing, with picked finish. The stones of the quoins and opening architraves project slightly and have draughted margins.

The station platform is of concrete, and still evident is the line of the former edge, before it was widened. The platform awning is of a common railway design with a butterfly roof reducing to a simple cantilever at the station, on a framing of narrow steel lattice girders.

The interior retains little of its original fabric, and has been largely remodelled. It presently houses offices, staff facilities, toilets and the entrance hall. The entrance hall still features a marble World War I honour board.

There are two outbuildings immediately to the south of the Station. The first is a small brick building, formerly a toilet block, with a hipped corrugated iron roof and roof ventilator. The second is a smaller timber building with a gabled roof. In front of the Station in the island formed by the driveway is a flower garden with shrubs and small trees.

=== Grafton Street Footbridge ===
The Footbridge spans across the railway lines from west to east connecting the two parts of Grafton Street. There are three 17.5 metres (57 ft) central spans, and approach sections at each end of some 7.5 metres (25 ft). It is framed with steel lattice trusses, with timber decking and steps. The handrails are back-to-back steel angles, and together with the steel stringers, incorporate a curve down to the landing of the stair. There are steel T sections curved to form brackets supporting the balustrade. The balustrade is enclosed with panels of chain-wire framed in timber.

=== Sale Yards ===
The Sale Yards are a series of open pavilions with bush-timber posts, concrete floors, dressed timber roof framing and corrugated iron roofs. The roofs are a mixture of gabled, half-gabled and hipped forms, with fixed timber louvres infilling some of the gables. The yards contain a series of pens, framed in walls and gates of timber slats, with some of the walls being relocatable to vary the size of the pens. The gates have sliding timber slats used as catches. To the periphery are a series of uncovered pens and loading ramps for vehicles and the railway. The smaller pavilion to the east of the group contains an auction pit surrounded by timber bench seats. The yards are presently still in use weekly for pig and calf sales.

=== Hamilton Street Buildings ===
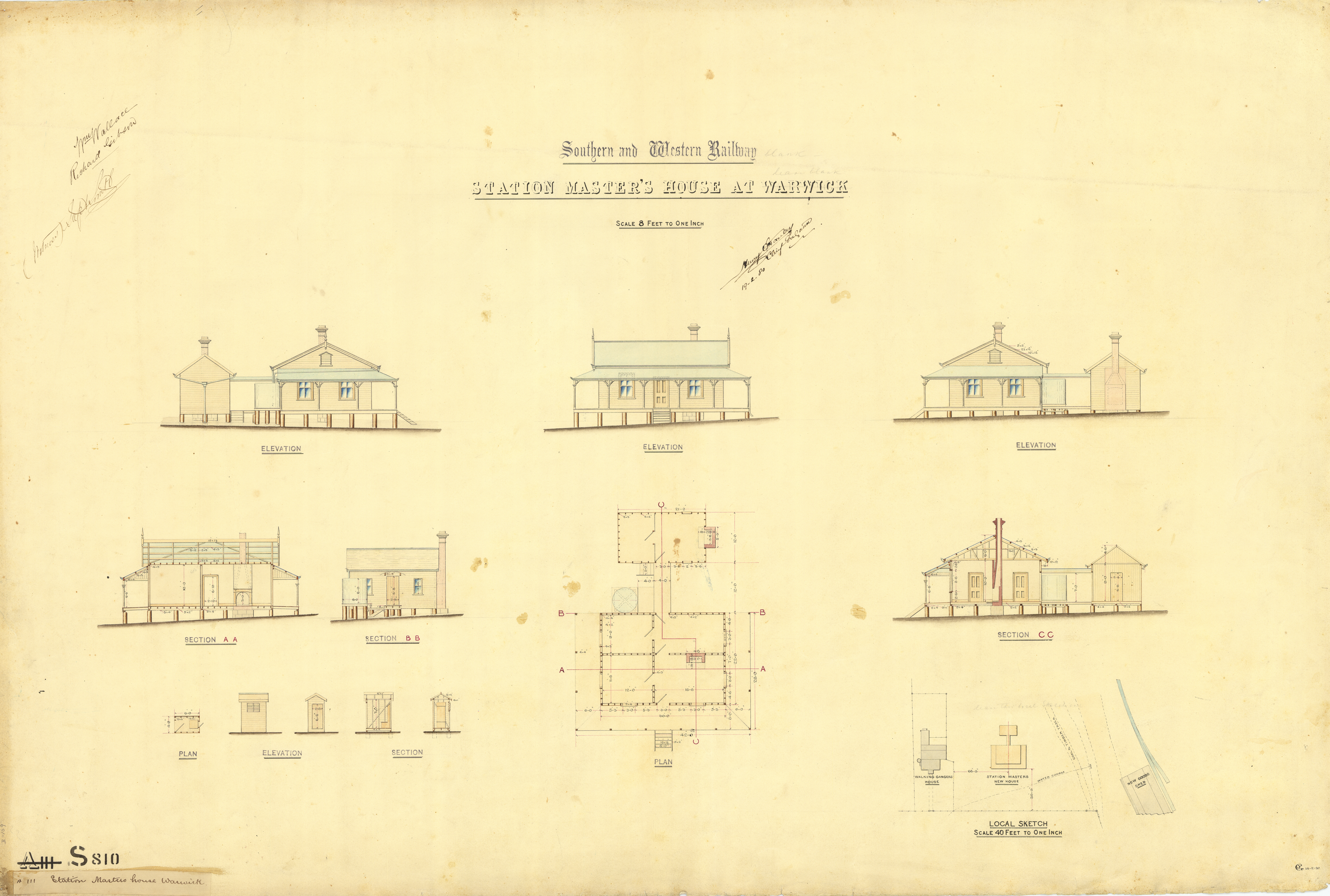
Architectural plans for the station master's house, 1880

Along Hamilton Street to the east of the station, are the Railway Institute Buildings and a series of quarters buildings. At the eastern end of the footbridge is the Railways Institute Building which has corrugated iron walls and gabled roof, and a small timber lean-to addition. Beside this, is the Billiards Room also of corrugated iron, with trapezoid-shaped shutters. Also nearby are the corrugated iron Plant Store and another Store known as the Boxing Room (now housing model trains). This branch of the Railway Institute is still active.

To the south of the footbridge along Hamilton Street are the remaining quarters buildings. The first is the Single Men's Quarters, a timber building with a hipped corrugated iron roof, and a posted verandah to all four sides, onto which open several doorways. Connected to the rear is a timber addition housing amenities. Similar to other parts of the complex, it has a perimeter fence of timber posts and a piece of upturned railway track as the rail.

Next is the Inspectors quarters, a high-set timber house with front verandah returning to the southern side, which is apparently a standard elevated pyramidal gatekeepers cottage. At the corner is the Station Masters house, also of timber and corrugated iron, which has both open and enclosed verandahs. Between are more recent small fibrous cement cottages.

=== Subways ===
To the north and south of the site, on Fitzroy and Percy Streets, concrete subways have been constructed for the road traffic, with bridges for the railways, to replace the level crossings.

=== Turntable ===
The Turntable located in the northeastern corner of the complex, has been excavated and is being restored to working order. The present pit measures some 17.5 metres (57 ft) in diameter, with evidence of the previous diameter of some 12 metres (39 ft) remaining on the concrete base of the pit. The remaining original walls of the pit are of rendered stone, with the refurbished walls being in face stonework. The turntable itself turns on a single circular rail at the perimeter of the pit, and revolves about a central pivot. It is constructed of steel plate, with steel handrails to both sides, and is power-operated from a control point at one end

To the north of the turntable is the former site of the engine shed. Four of the concrete-lined ashpits have been excavated, leaving three still covered. Between the rail lines are timber stumps which are the remainders of the shed's structural posts. The position of these pits and stumps are evidence of the shed's size and curved form.

To the south of the turntable is an iron water tank on a timber stand, which has been brought in from elsewhere. Although lower in height, it is said to be reminiscent of the original tanks which once stood in this location. To the east of the turntable is a recent steel shed in which railway carriages are presently being restored. The roundhouse is occupied by Downs Explorer (formerly the Southern Downs Steam Railway).

== Heritage listing ==
Warwick Railway Station was listed on the Queensland Heritage Register on 24 September 1999 having satisfied the following criteria.

The place is important in demonstrating the evolution or pattern of Queensland's history.

The railway station complex demonstrates the pattern of growth of Warwick, and the development of the railway in southern Queensland and the network of rail-lines centred on Warwick.

The place demonstrates rare, uncommon or endangered aspects of Queensland's cultural heritage.

The Passenger Station and Goods Shed are unusual among Queensland railway building, as they were constructed from stone, reflecting the abundant supply of local sandstone. The sale yards are another rare feature of the railway complex. Many saleyards were constructed within railway complexes in Queensland and few of these survive.

The place is important in demonstrating the principal characteristics of a particular class of cultural places.

The Warwick Railway Complex is an intact example of a railway precinct dating from the late 19th century. The additions and alterations which have occurred reflect the changes and development of the railway system in southern Queensland. The site with extant passenger station, goods' shed, footbridge, turntable pit, various residences, camping quarters, railway workers' institute and other communal buildings, sale yards and various other smaller buildings and structures, including the extant sidings is an important document of Queensland railway history.

The place is important because of its aesthetic significance.

Several individual buildings on the site have aesthetic merit including the goods' shed which is a fine stone building; the passenger station; the goods yards; and the corrugated iron buildings on the eastern side of the block.

The place has a strong or special association with a particular community or cultural group for social, cultural or spiritual reasons.

The site has special associations with the Warwick community, as a centre of trade and travel for about 110 years.
