= Queensland Beyer-Garratt class =

Class of Australian 4-8-2+2-8-4 locomotives

Queensland Railways Beyer-Garratt class
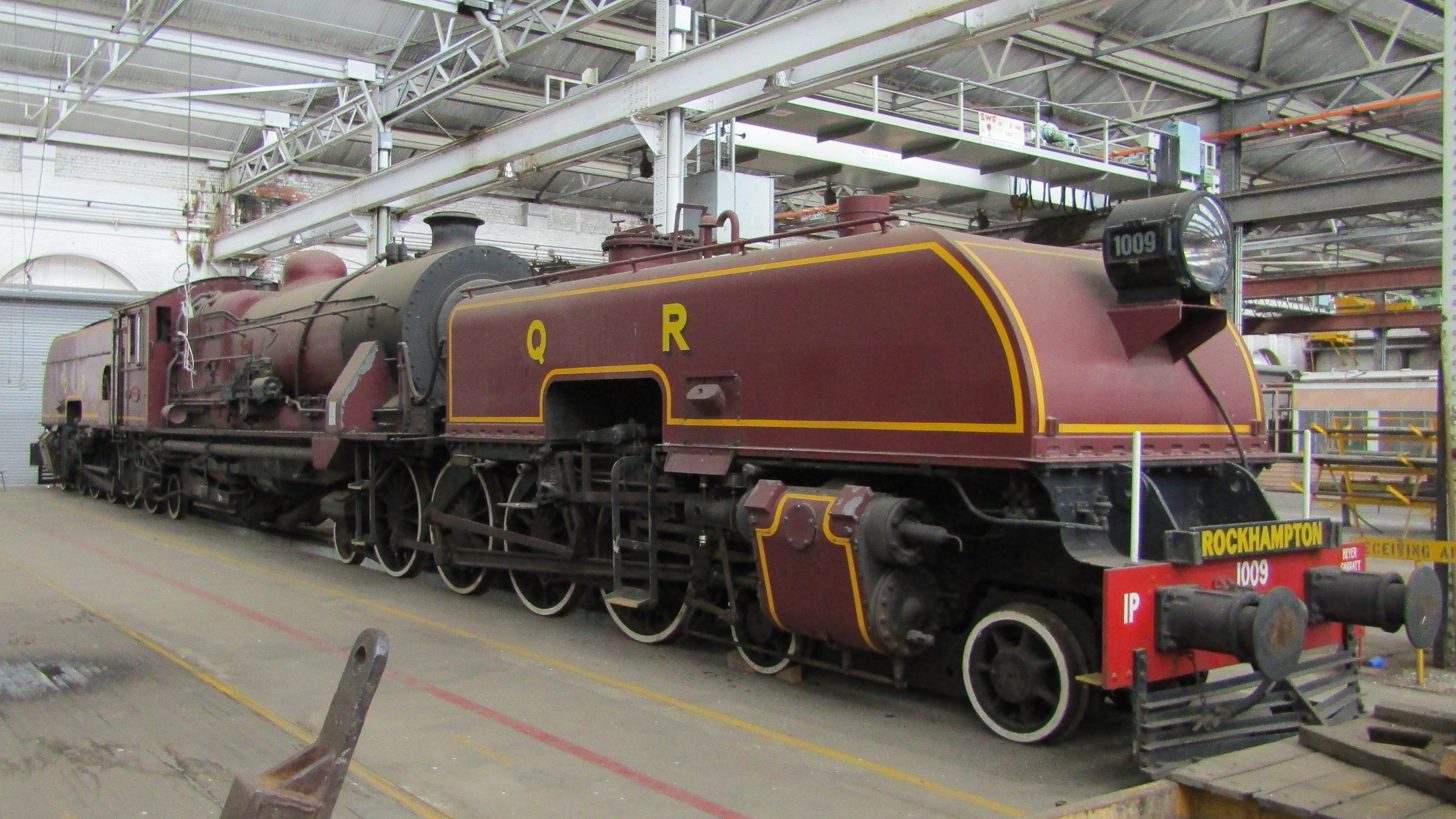
- 1009 in storage at North Ipswich Railway Workshops
Type and origin
- Power type: Steam
- Builder: Beyer, Peacock & Company (10); Société Franco-Belge (20)
- Build date: 1950-1951
- Total produced: 30
Specifications
- Configuration
  - Whyte: 4-8-2+2-8-4
- Gauge: 1,067 mm (3 ft 6 in)
- Driver dia.: 4 ft 3 in (1,295 mm)
- Length: 90 ft (27.43 m)
- Adhesive weight: 76.9 long tons (78.1 t; 86.1 short tons)
- Loco weight: 137 long tons (139.2 t; 153.4 short tons)
- Fuel type: Coal
- Fuel capacity: 6 long tons (6.1 t; 6.7 short tons)
- Water cap.: 3,800 imp gal (17,280 L)
- Firebox
  - Grate area: 39 sq ft (3.6 m^{2})
- Boiler pressure: 200 psi (1,379 kPa)
- Heating surface
  - Tubes and flues: 1,670 sq ft (155 m^{2})
- Superheater
  - Heating area: 455 sq ft (42.3 m^{2})
- Cylinders: 4 outside
- Cylinder size: 13 3/4 in × 26 in (349 mm × 660 mm)
Performance figures
- Tractive effort: 32,770 lbf (145.77 kN)
Career
- Operators: Queensland Railways
- Numbers: 1001-1010, 1090-1109
- Preserved: 1009
- Disposition: 1 preserved, 29 scrapped

The Queensland Railways Beyer-Garratt class locomotive was a class of 4-8-2+2-8-4 steam locomotives operated by the Queensland Railways.

== Overview ==
A Garratt (also known as Beyer-Garratt) is a type of steam locomotive that is articulated in three parts. Its boiler is mounted on the centre frame, and two steam engines are mounted on separate frames, one on each end of the boiler. Articulation permits larger locomotives to negotiate curves and lighter rails that might restrict large rigid-framed locomotives. Many Garratt designs aimed to double the power of the largest conventional locomotives operating on their railways, thus reducing the need for multiple locomotives and crews.

The initial plan had been to use these engines on the proposed air-conditioned trains that were being designed at the time. This never eventuated, although they did regularly haul The Midlander, mainly between Emerald and Bogantungan for some years. They were used on the Rockhampton Mail and Sunshine Express in the early 1950s.

== Builders ==
The first 10 engines were constructed by Beyer, Peacock & Company, Manchester. Owing to a full order book the company subcontracted the remaining 20 to Société Franco-Belge, Raismes, France.

== Livery ==
All were painted Midland red and had chrome yellow lining with large QR monograms on the sides of the front tank and bunker. Unfortunately this attractive livery easily discoloured particularly as a result of priming. The engines were not regularly cleaned when relegated to goods train working in latter years and their appearance rapidly deteriorated.

== Service ==
Originally trialled on the Brisbane to Toowoomba line, they were soon withdrawn from this section due to problems with limited clearances in the tunnels. They were used extensively on North Coast Line between Brisbane and Rockhampton. By 1956, this working had become restricted to mainly north of Bundaberg. They did not work north of St Lawrence on the North Coast Line. On the Central West Line they initially ran between Rockhampton and Emerald, and from 1957 their range was extended to Bogantungan.

A few were based at Mayne until 1955 and some at North Bundaberg until 1956, when all were allocated to Rockhampton. In later years they worked Moura coal trains via Mount Morgan, prior to the opening of the short line to Gladstone. One of their last regular tasks was on limestone trains between Tarcoola and Gladstone. Increasing numbers of diesels saw mass withdrawals of these engines. Twenty-two were written off in June 1968.

== Advantages and disadvantages ==
They were subject to much positive publicity when introduced but failed to live up to all expectations. They were attributed with saving 19,500 miles of assistant and goods engine running on the Bundaberg – Rockhampton – Emerald sections between October 1950 and June 1951. Steaming difficulties were encountered with South Queensland coals; however they performed well on Blair Athol coal. The boilers had a tendency to prime. Limited coal and water capacity caused worries. General overhauls cost about three times those for a B18¼ class.

== Features ==
They had a number of unique features (for QR steam engines) including Ajax air operated butterfly fire doors, Hadfield power reverse gear, speedometers and also flow meters; the latter being fitted to the class in 1955. The outer bogies and inner trucks had roller bearings but the coupled axles have plain bearings. Several engines received fabricated stove pipe chimneys to replace the original cast ones that had been damaged.

== Preservation ==
No. 1009 was preserved as a static exhibit at the Redbank Locomotive Museum, was taken into North Ipswich Railway Workshops in 1993 and restored to working order. Subsequently, due to a leaking fusible plug, it was taken out of service. Overhaul of the locomotive subsequently started but was halted due to costs. In August 2020, it was announced by the Workshops Rail Museum that 1009 has been lent by Queensland Rail to become a permanent exhibition at the museum.

== Bibliography ==
- Queensland Railways (1950). The Beyer-Garratt Locomotive operating manual. A.H. Tucker, Government Printer.
