= Privatisation in Australia =

Privatisation in Australia is the process of transiting a public service or good to the private sector through a variety of mechanisms that was commenced by the Federal Government in the 1990s, receiving bipartisan support. More generally, privatisation is a set of economic policies that is part of a broader system of deregulation of government services, underpinned by the ideology of Liberalism, in order to achieve economic outcomes of growth, efficiency and productivity. Some examples of sectors that have been privatised include finance, telecommunications and infrastructure. Australia's public service has also transformed with the introduction of New Public Management (NPM) in the late twentieth century which altered public administration models to appear more "business-like" through performance evaluations that emphasise efficiency, productivity and service delivery.

Another definition of privatisation is reliance on "more on private institutions and less on government, to satisfy people’s needs”. The concept of privatisation can be construed in a narrow or broad sense. The narrow scope of privatisation is portrayed as the sale of public goods, while the broader understanding of privatisation involves the transfer of "ownership, management, finance and control" of public goods to private actors. Historically, the Australian government played an influential role in society as the idea of a strong state was prevalent to the Australian story since Federation. This changed in the twentieth-century, as Australia's adoption of privatisation as a set of government policies, reflected the rise of privatisation across the Western world, specifically in the United States and United Kingdom. The Australian experience of privatisation involves substituting government ownership, provision and funding to the private sector, in an attempt to liberalise the economy. The effectiveness of such policies is contested, as the motivations of privatisation are widely debated.

== History ==
The greatest influence on privatisation in Australia were the policies of the Thatcher government, who “unleashed a wave of privatizations that transformed the economy” and became a model for other Western economies. Unlike the rest of the world, Australia's privatisation program was relatively early as it first commenced in the 1990s, under the Hawke Labor government. The New South Wales state government began the process of privatisation earlier than the federal government, in 1989. Australia's first act of privatisation occurred in 1991, when the federal government sold the Commonwealth Bank of Australia, followed by the partial sale of Telstra and Qantas, all of which were significant national icons. The sectors most affected by privatisation in the 1990s, were finance, electricity and transport, estimating profits of up to $61 billion from both federal and state privatisation policies. Consequently, Australia became second ranked in the world for privatisation profits, employing one of the most comprehensive programs, the effects of which are continuing to impact the economy.

=== Hawke-Keating government (1983–1996) ===
The Hawke-Keating Labor governments were instrumental in implementing deregulation policies that resulted in modernizing Australia's economy. Emerging industries replaced traditional ones that suddenly became non-competitive, as productivity in the finance, education and legal sector increased, as real wages grew concurrently. The decision to transition the Australian Dollar to a floating exchange rate in 1983 increased stability and confidence in the economy, as part of the deregulation program, that laid the foundations for a modern economy. While privatisation is supported by neoliberal ideology that stipulates less government intervention in the economy, Australia's history of privatisation was initiated under a Labor government, which appears to defy Labor Party policy objectives. However, during the Hawke-Keating years, there were attempts to remove the ideological underpinnings of the debate on privatisation, as the approach taken by the government was "more about a pragmatic choice" to modernise and open the economy to international markets. Prime Minister Hawke said, "The difference between us will be one of ideology. That will distinguish us from the opposition (Liberals)." Hawke was rebuking the charge that Labor had abandoned its commitments to public ownership and enterprise, while highlighting the need for economic rationalism in order to address pressing economic problems. The consensus-style leadership of Bob Hawke enabled structural economic reforms, through the Accord struck in 1983 between Labor and the Australian Council of Trade Unions (ACTU). This accord brought together various stakeholders from unions, welfare organisations and the business community, to secure a mandate for market-oriented economic reforms, while remaining committed to social progress.

=== Howard government (1996–2007) ===
Privatization was implemented by successive governments, including the Howard government in 1996 to 2007, which saw record rates of continuous economic growth, a testament which economists attribute to the economic reforms of the Hawke–Keating government. Economists indicate the continuous rates of economic growth were not the result of Howard's policies of privatization, but rather, to one of the world's biggest booms in the mining sector, where investments rose from 2 to 8 percent of GDP. The difference between privatization under Hawke-Keating and Howard governments, is argued to be one of ideology, however this does not suggest the Labor Party was not divided on this issue and continues to be. Privatization remained part of government policy through the twenty-first century, as it represented a form of economic rationalism.

== Types of privatisation ==
The following methods of privatisation are common for governments to employ:

1. Divestiture: The sale of public services to private industry. This is one of the simplest methods of privatisation, where all aspects of a government asset are sold off to private buyers.
2. Withdrawal: The government no longer supplies a service and enables private providers to enter. Therefore, it withdraws from the public sphere and enables the market to fill the void.
3. Outsourcing: Governments, through a contractual agreement, confers non-core functions of a service to “private service providers to deliver services to the public.”
4. Divestment: Leasing or selling public assets to the private sector, however the government has some control over the regulatory mechanisms of the private asset .
5. Public-private-partnership (PPP): Private financing of infrastructure, through an agreement with private corporations. An example of this is Sydney's WestConnex project, where the government offsets the risk of construction to Transurban, a private company, which also removes the burden of government accumulating debt.

Paul Keating announcing the floating of the Australian Dollar in 1983, as part of the economic program of deregulation

=== Government approaches ===
Governments have differing approaches to privatisation policies, such as pragmatic, tactical and systemic privatisation.

Pragmatic privatisation is highly technical and engages in solving problems. This approach is privatisation is conditional upon the fact that public interests are preserved, therefore it is bereft of ideology. Former Treasurer Wayne Swan believes that Labor's economic reforms were pragmatic and rational, in contrast to Thatcherism. He coined the term, "Australian Laborism" to describe liberal economic policies that also assist working families and are pro-union.

Tactical privatisation seeks to gain short-term political benefits for parties or political actors. By serving political goals, this approach to privatization is appealing to supporters, especially during specific political or global events. Some economists categorize Labor's privatisation scheme in the 1990s as tactical, because it aimed to achieve macroeconomic aims to ensure the competitiveness of Australia's economy, against the backdrop of an increasingly globalised economy.

The systemic approach to privatisation is derived from ideological predispositions that seek to restructure society by minimizing government influence. The ultimate objective of this approach is to “encourage greater reliance on the market than the state”. This approach was undertaken during Howard's leadership, as privatisation was underpinned by ideology, to ensure smaller government interference in the economy and to embolden private market actors over the public sector. Howard's systemic approach to privatisation is encapsulated in the following quote: "[T]he coalition...has...embraced a full-blooded policy of privatisation." This relates to Thatcher's concept of privatisation, which incorporates an ideological aspect of shrinking government interference in society, according to the classical liberal theory.

== Cases ==
=== National ===
==== Commonwealth Bank of Australia (1991–1996) ====
The Commonwealth Bank of Australia (CBA), often referred to as the People's Bank, was privatised in three stages, commencing from 1991 to 1996, by Treasurer Paul Keating, representing one of the earliest privatisation projects in Australia. It was initiated due to the burden of government investment to ensure the viability of the Bank, which was "a net cost to the taxpayer". The profits accumulated from the sale of Commonwealth Bank equated over $7 billion by 1996. In recent years, the CBA has become one of the most profitable banks in Australia, with strong financial performance and a 10% growth in dividends annually. This policy was considered sensible by economists at the time, due to the competitive environment which CBA was operating in, rendering it inefficient.

==== Qantas (1992) ====
The partial sale of Qantas, is an example of privatisation of one of Australia's iconic brands, which was initiated in 1992. The government legislated to ensure Qantas was prohibited more than 50 per cent foreign ownership. A quarter of the shares were sold to British Airways, while the remaining were available to the public, which floated in 1995. The executive board of Qantas view this as a success, citing increasing staff numbers, flights and revenue growth since privatisation. However, critics claim that privatisation of Qantas has failed, due to its weak financial position, with a loss of over $2 billion in 2014.

==== Telstra (1997) ====
The telecommunications industry underwent the process of deregulation in Australia in 1997 by the Howard government. When Telecom and Telecommunications Corporation amalgamated in 1992, Telstra was formed. Approximately, 33 percent of Telstra shares were sold, indicating a partial privatisation. Consequently, Telstra gained a monopoly over pay TV infrastructure and did not improve its network unless it received government funding. Telstra's monopoly over telecommunications infrastructure in Australia was a direct result of privatisation, limiting market competition and efficiency, which contradict the objectives of privatisation.

==== Medibank (2014) ====
On 26 March 2014, the Liberal Abbott government Minister for Finance Mathias Cormann announced that Medibank would be sold through an initial public offering in the 2014–2015 financial year.

=== State ===
==== Victoria ====
The Liberal government of Jeff Kennett in the 1990s had a major scheme for privatisation of state-owned services, including the electricity (SECV) and gas (Gas and Fuel Corporation of Victoria) utilities, the ambulance service, as well as several prisons and other minor services. The sale of the Totalisator Agency Board raised $609 million. Between 1995 and 1998, $29 billion of state assets in gas and electricity alone were sold to private enterprise (for statistics, see Parkinson, Jeff, 1999).

The Labor government of Daniel Andrews in 2018 oversaw the Privatisation of the Land Titles and Registry office for $2.8 billion.

In 2022, The Andrews government oversaw the VicRoads part of registration and licensing privatised.

==== South Australia 1990s ====
The Liberal government of John Olsen undertook the privatisation of the state-owned electricity industry (ETSA), despite promising not to do so at the 1997 election.

The management of the state's water supply was privatised in 1996 with a $1.5bn 15-year contract being awarded to United Water, a subsidiary of Veolia. The privatisation of government services which included the single largest public outsourcing project of its kind at the time in the world – the outsourcing of the State's water industry, a contract which included the establishment of a private sector water industry.

==== Queensland Privatisation ====
The Anna Bligh Labor government had a privatization agenda.

Bligh announced the privatisation of five government owned corporations:

- Queensland Motorways Limited (Operating the Gateway Bridge and Logan Motorway tolling systems)
- The Port of Brisbane Authority
- Forestry Plantations Queensland
- Abbot Point Coal Terminal
- Coal-carrying rail lines, currently owned by Queensland Rail (QR Passenger services will remain nationalised).

More than 3,000 workers were to be offered voluntary redundancies, just three months after the public float of QR National.

Bligh faced resistance from both within her party and the trade union movement, but defended her privatisation plan as 'not negotiable'.

==== New South Wales ====
In 2008, Labor premier Morris Iemma pushed for electricity privatisation, but was out-voted within the Labor party.

In 2014, Liberal premier Mike Baird oversaw the sale of a 50% stake in the Port of Newcastle to China Merchants Group, a state-owned Chinese business. At the next election in 2015, Labor strongly opposed privatisation, but were defeated by Baird.

In 2021, NSW Labor's victory signaled Australian Labor turns against privatisation and Chris Minns’ Labor Party ruled out any further privatisations of state-owned assets linking the Coalition government’s previous modus operandi of ‘asset recycling’ to strandling the state with higher debt, worse services, and rising bills.

The NSW Parliamentary Research Service has published a report 'Privatisation in NSW: a timeline and key sources' detailing privatisations that have occurred in NSW since 1989.

===== Sale of NSW Electricity (2015) =====
On 14 December 2010 Kristina Keneally Labor government sold the first tranche of the partial privatisation of the state's electricity assets for $5.3 billion. After criticism of the privatisation, her Government abandoned the second stage of its electricity privatisation plan, as no companies bid.

In 2015, the Liberal Baird government privatised electricity in NSW in exchange for $16 billion in revenue. Half of NSW electricity was sold, while the remaining was leased for 99 years. Despite its unpopularity with the electorate, as 67% of NSW voters opposed it, the Baird Government was elected on a mandate to proceed with the sale. Economists have signaled caution about privatizing electricity networks, due to the risk of creating a monopoly, which runs contrary to the policy aims of privatisation. While concerns have been raised about rising electricity prices and the loss of jobs in the electricity sector, the state government promised cheaper prices and the need to use the revenue generated from privatisation, for infrastructure projects across the state.

A number of senior Labor figures came out in support, including former Prime Minister Paul Keating, former NSW Treasurer Michael Costa, and former federal Resources Minister Martin Ferguson. Following the election, former Labor Premiers Bob Carr and Morris Iemma and former Labor Treasurer Michael Egan added their voices in support.

== Impact ==
Privatisation remains somewhat unpopular with the Australian electorate, which explains why the debate can be marred by ideology. Australia's experience of privatisation differs from the United States and United Kingdom, as early economic objectives were pursued in conjunction with social objectives. The Australian government has benefited from $100 billion from privatisation since the 1990s, with mixed results of successes and failures.

The impact of privatisation is nuanced, yielding short-term economic benefits, but deeper economic concerns in the long-term. The sale of Telstra accounted for $1 billion in government revenue, claimed to enable the government to combat climate change and also repay deficits. Despite this positive effect of privatisation, Telstra's monopoly over telecommunications infrastructure in Australia led to limited market competition, which reduced investment in the sector. Lack of investment stalled innovation which lead to reduced quality in services, even though customers were being overcharged. Once alternative telecommunication infrastructures entered the market, Telstra's monopoly diminished, which lowered prices for customers. However as of 2025, coverage is limited in regional areas, resulting in competition concerns.

The privatisation of Commonwealth Bank of Australia was justified based on the competition it faced from private banks who offered cheaper products to consumers. Australian economist, John Quiggin, reveals that despite the sensible rationale in privatising the Commonwealth Bank, it represents a net loss to the taxpayer. Profits in the company have grown which explains the CBA Chief Executive Officer's highest salary package of $16.2 million in 2010. Financial deregulation has improved some aspects of CBA's operations as it is projected to become Australia's leading digital bank, while raising fees, reducing services, and in recent years, unethical conduct in the sector, were revealed by the Banking Royal Commission.

A report from the People’s Inquiry in 2017, reveals the overall experience of Australian privatisation has been largely negative, citing job losses, reduced services and rising prices in various sectors across aged care, prison systems, railway and social service.

=== Positive ===
- Economic efficiency: performance figures measured by financial returns. However, efficiency also measures the objectives of the firm, relative to its performance, which may not provide an accurate report.
- Competition: Removing government influence relates to less regulation, which is claimed to improve competition.
- Reduced political interference: The removal of government influence ensures that assets or services are run privately by firms that seek efficiency, with little political interference which produces more productive and efficient outcomes.

=== Negative ===
- Rising inequality: Withdrawal of government influence enlarges the gap of inequality, due to the need to serve public interests.
- Job losses: contractors and outsourced functions of the service renders existing full-time employees redundant.
- Increased prices: The cost for services that have been privatised or assets managed by private corporations can raise costs. Since privatisation of Australia's electricity, prices have risen by 183 per cent.

== See also ==
- Economic liberalization
- Free market
- Laissez-faire
