= Queensland Rail =

Railway operator in Queensland, Australia

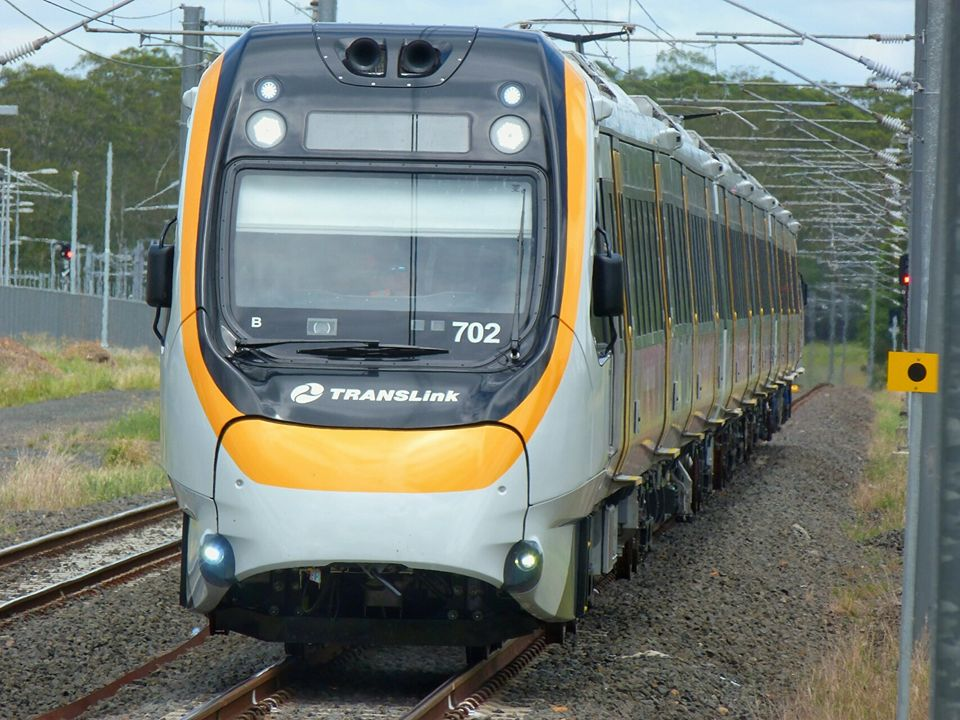
- New Generation Rollingstock
- Industry: Railway operator
- Founded: 31 July 1865; 161 years ago
- Headquarters: Brisbane, Queensland, Australia
- Area served: Queensland
- Key people: Katarzyna Stapleton (CEO)
- Revenue: $2.3 billion (2021/22)
- Operating income: $392 million (2021/22)
- Net income: $195 million (2021/22)
- Owner: Queensland Government
- Number of employees: over 7,500 (Feb 2022)
- Website: queenslandrail.com.au

Queensland Rail (QR) is a railway operator in Queensland, Australia. Queensland Rail is owned by the Queensland Government, and operates both suburban and interurban rail services in South East Queensland, as well as long-distance passenger train services connecting Brisbane to regional Queensland. Queensland Rail also owns and maintains rolling stock, in addition to approximately 6,600 kilometres (4,101 mi) of track and related infrastructure.

== History ==
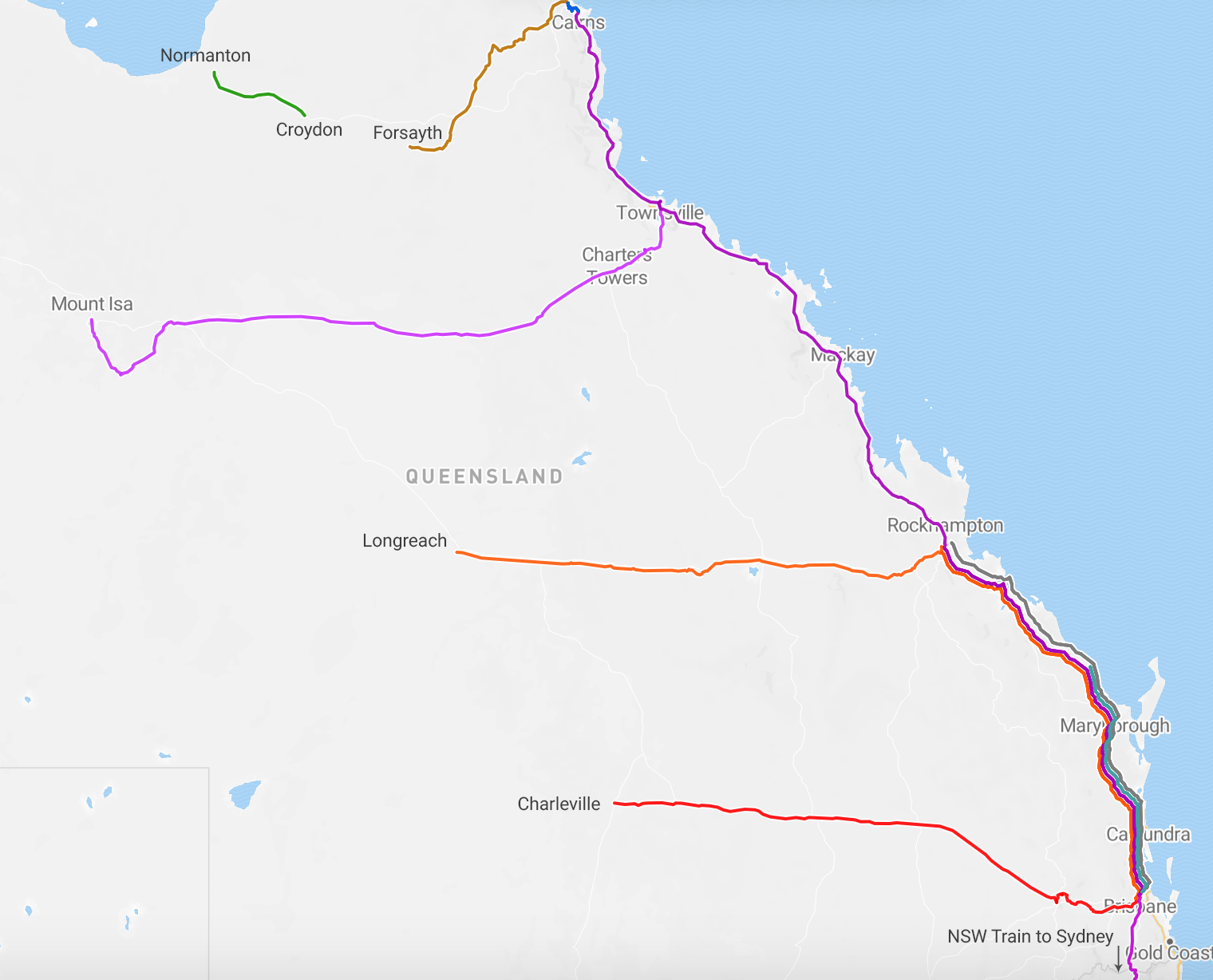
Queensland Rail network

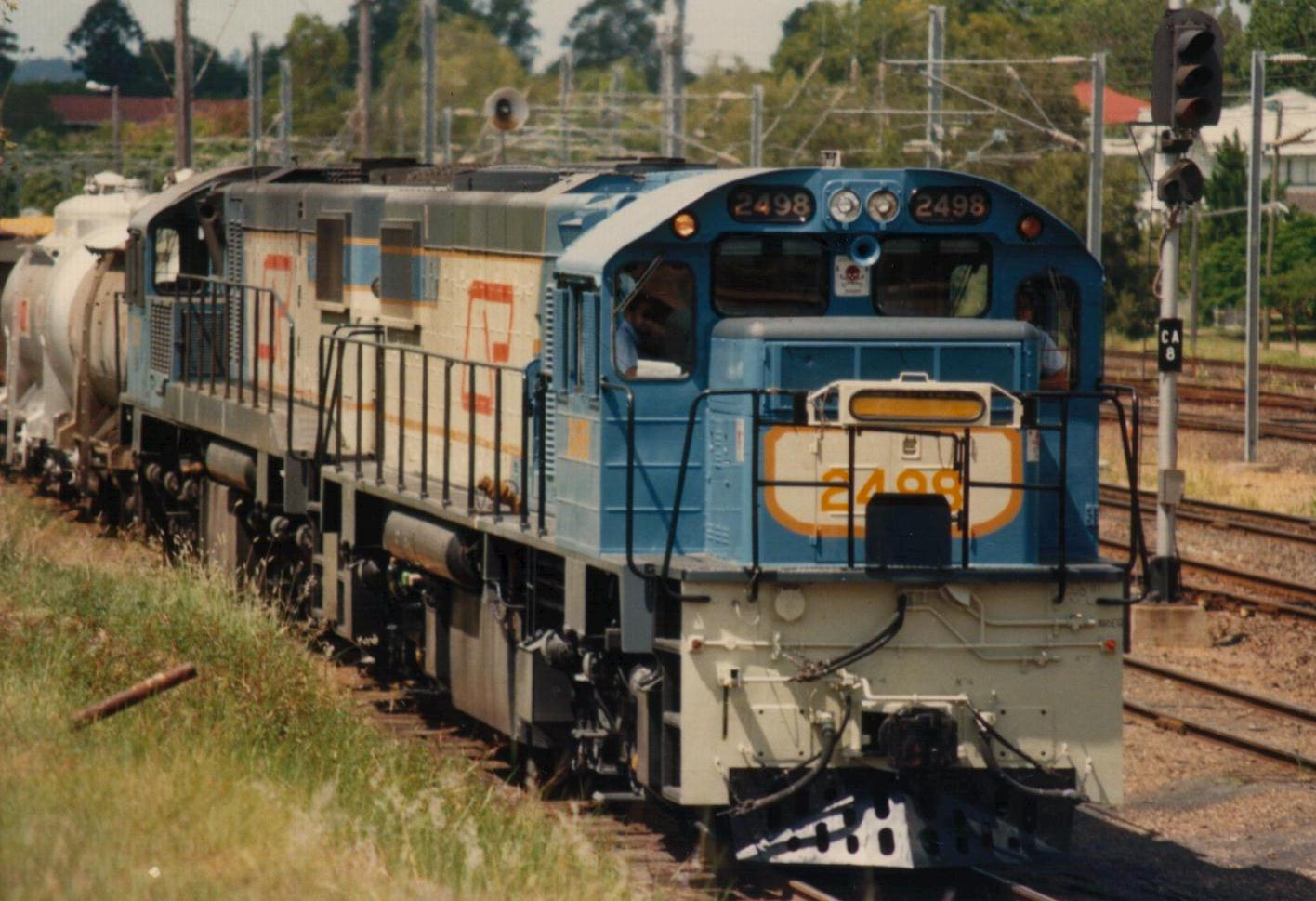
2470 class at Corinda in the original diesel livery in February 1998

=== Early history ===
Queensland Railways was the first operator in the world to adopt a narrow gauge (in this case 1,067 mm or 3 ft 6 in) for a main line, and this remains the system-wide gauge in Queensland.

The colony of Queensland separated from New South Wales in 1859, and the new government was keen to facilitate development and immigration. Improved transport to the fertile Darling Downs region situated west of Toowoomba was seen as a priority. As adequate river transport was already established between the capital Brisbane and the then separate settlement of Ipswich, the railway commenced from the latter locality and the initial section, built over the relatively flat, easy country opened to Bigge's Camp, at the eastern base of the Little Liverpool Range, on 31 July 1865. Called the Main Line, the only significant engineering work on that section was the bridge over the Bremer River to North Ipswich.

Tunneling excavation through the Little Liverpool Range delayed the opening of the next section to Gatton by 10 months, but the line was opened to Toowoomba in 1867, the ascent of the Main Range being the reason for the adoption of narrow gauge.

Built by the Queensland Government to the unusual (for the time) gauge of 1,067 mm (3 ft 6 in), the line largely followed the alignment surveyed by a private company, the Moreton Bay Tramway Company, which had proposed to build a 1,435 mm (4 ft 8 1/2 in) standard gauge horse-drawn tramway but had been unable to raise funds to do so beyond an initial start on earthworks.

The adoption of a narrow gauge was controversial at the time and was largely predicated by the government's desire for the fastest possible construction timeframe at the least cost. This resulted in the adoption of sharper curves and a lower axle load than was considered possible using the standard gauge, and an assessment at the time put the cost of a narrow gauge line from Ipswich to Toowoomba at 25% of the cost of a standard gauge line. Given that the colony only had a population of ~30,000 at the time, more expensive options would not have been financially viable.

The network evolved as a series of isolated networks. It wasn't until the completion of the North Coast line in December 1924 that all were joined. The exception was the Normanton to Croydon line which always remained isolated. At its peak in 1932, the network totaled 10,500 kilometres (6,524 mi).

Changing transport patterns resulted in the closure of many development branch lines from 1948 onwards, but at the same time the main lines were upgraded to provide contemporary services, and from the 1970s an extensive network of new lines was developed, particularly to service export coal mines.

=== Electrification ===
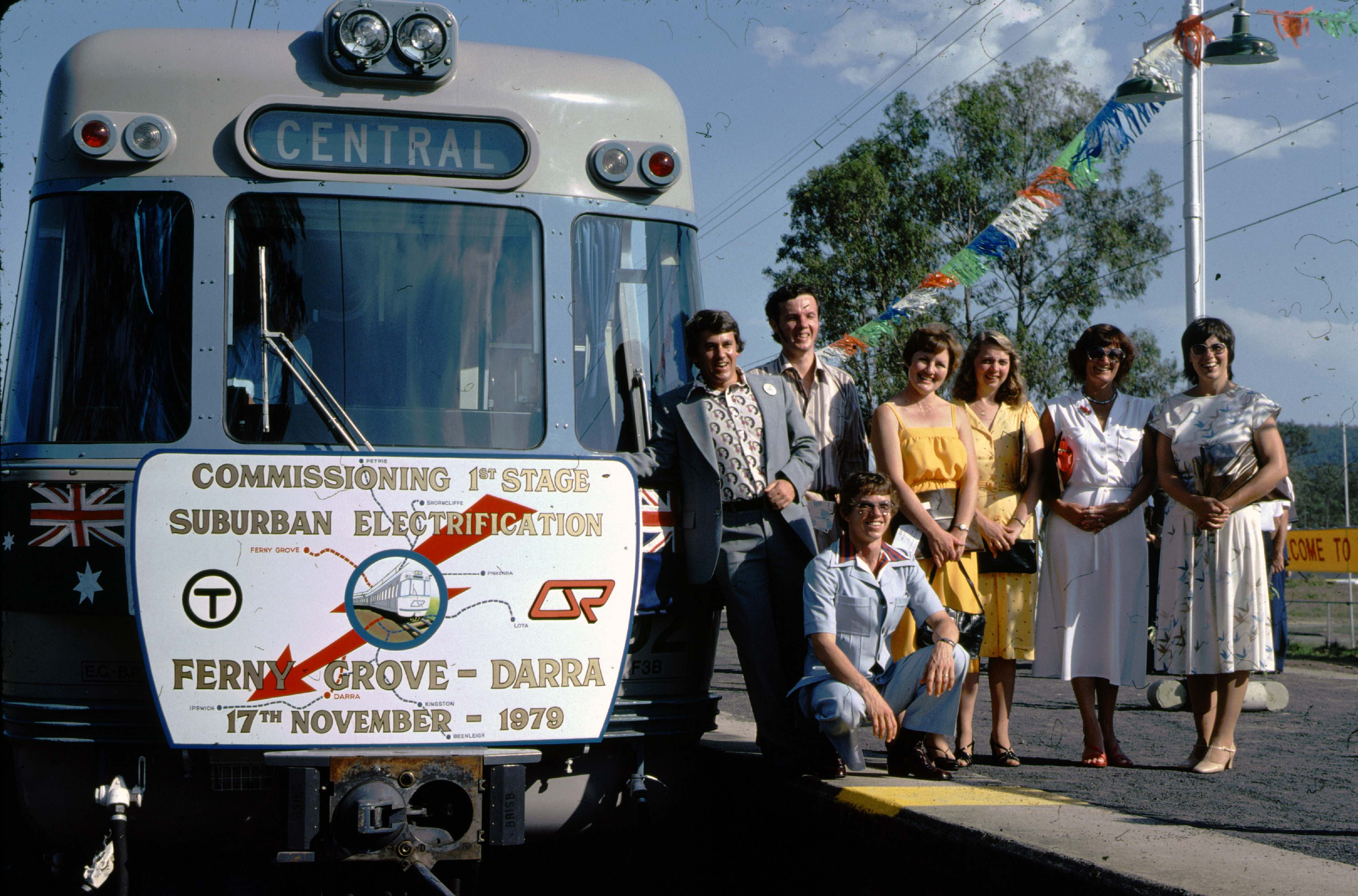
EMU01 at Ferny Grove station on the first electric service in Brisbane in November 1979

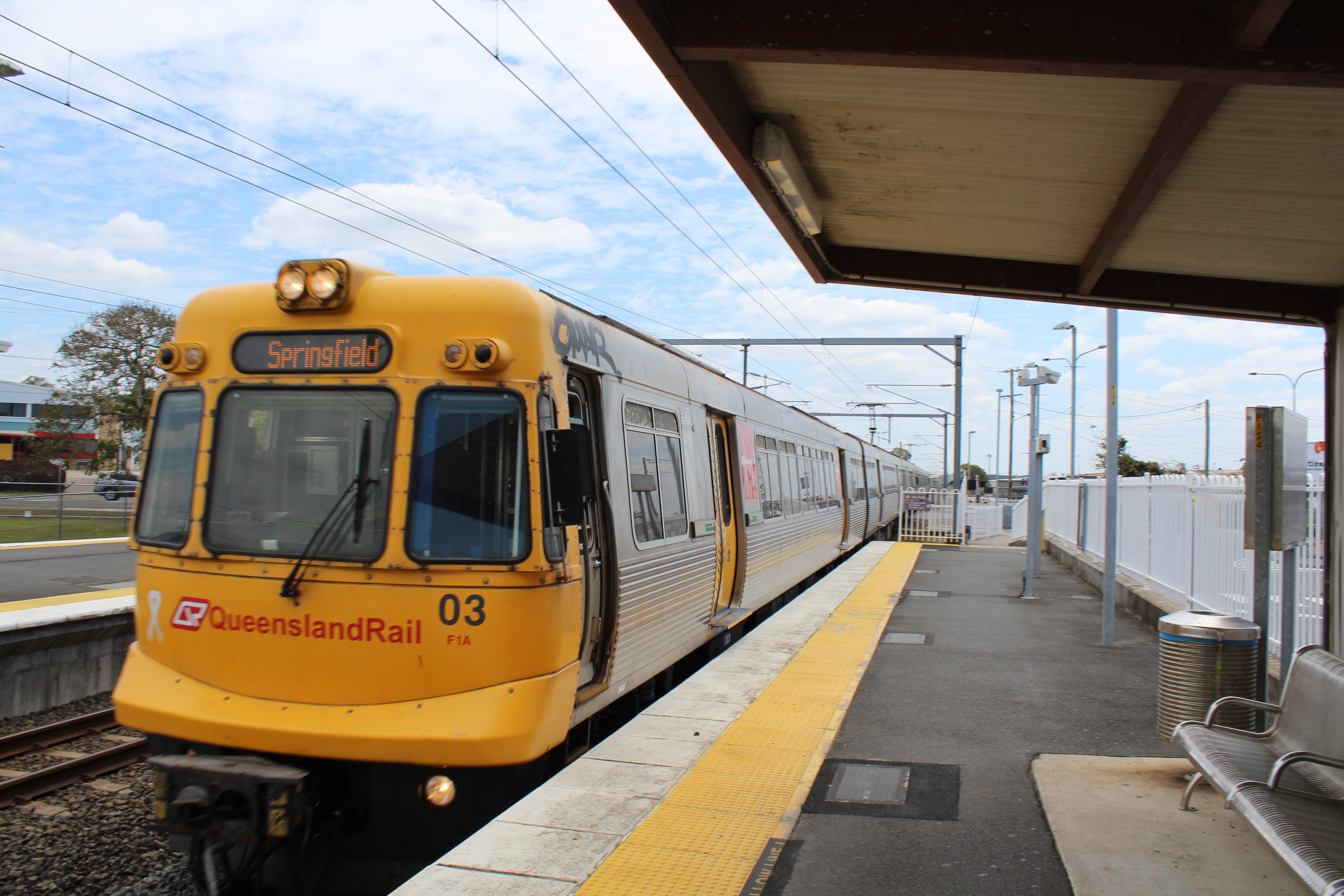
EMU03 at Sunshine in October 2016

Commencing in November 1979, the Brisbane suburban network was electrified.

In 1978, discussions were commenced on the possible electrification of the Blackwater and Goonyella coal networks. This was due to an expected increase in coal traffic across the networks, an ageing diesel-electric locomotive fleet and the increase in diesel fuel costs. By early 1983, a decision had been made to electrify the networks and by early 1984, contracts were already starting to be let for the new locomotives and other works for the project. The decision was made to electrify with the 25 kV AC railway electrification system as used on the Brisbane suburban network. This would allow future connection of the Brisbane network with the coal networks via the North Coast line.

The project was to be carried out in four stages:

- Stage 1: Electrification of the main line from Gladstone to Rockhampton, including parts of Rockhampton marshalling yard, then west to Blackwater and the coal mines in the area. This was a total of 720 kilometres (447 mi) of the track.
- Stage 2: Electrification of the coal lines south of Dalrymple Bay and Hay Point, then west through the Goonyella system, southwest to Blair Athol and south to Gregory – linking the Goonyella system to the Blackwater system. This was a total of 773 kilometres (480 mi) of the track.
- Stage 3: Electrification of the main western line from Burngrove to Emerald. This would allow electric freight from Rockhampton to Emerald.
- Stage 4: Electrification of the line from Newlands coal mine to Collinsville and northeast to Abbott Point. This stage never went ahead. In 1986, it was decided to electrify the North Coast line between Brisbane and Gladstone instead and this became known as Stage 4.

=== Interstate freight expansion ===
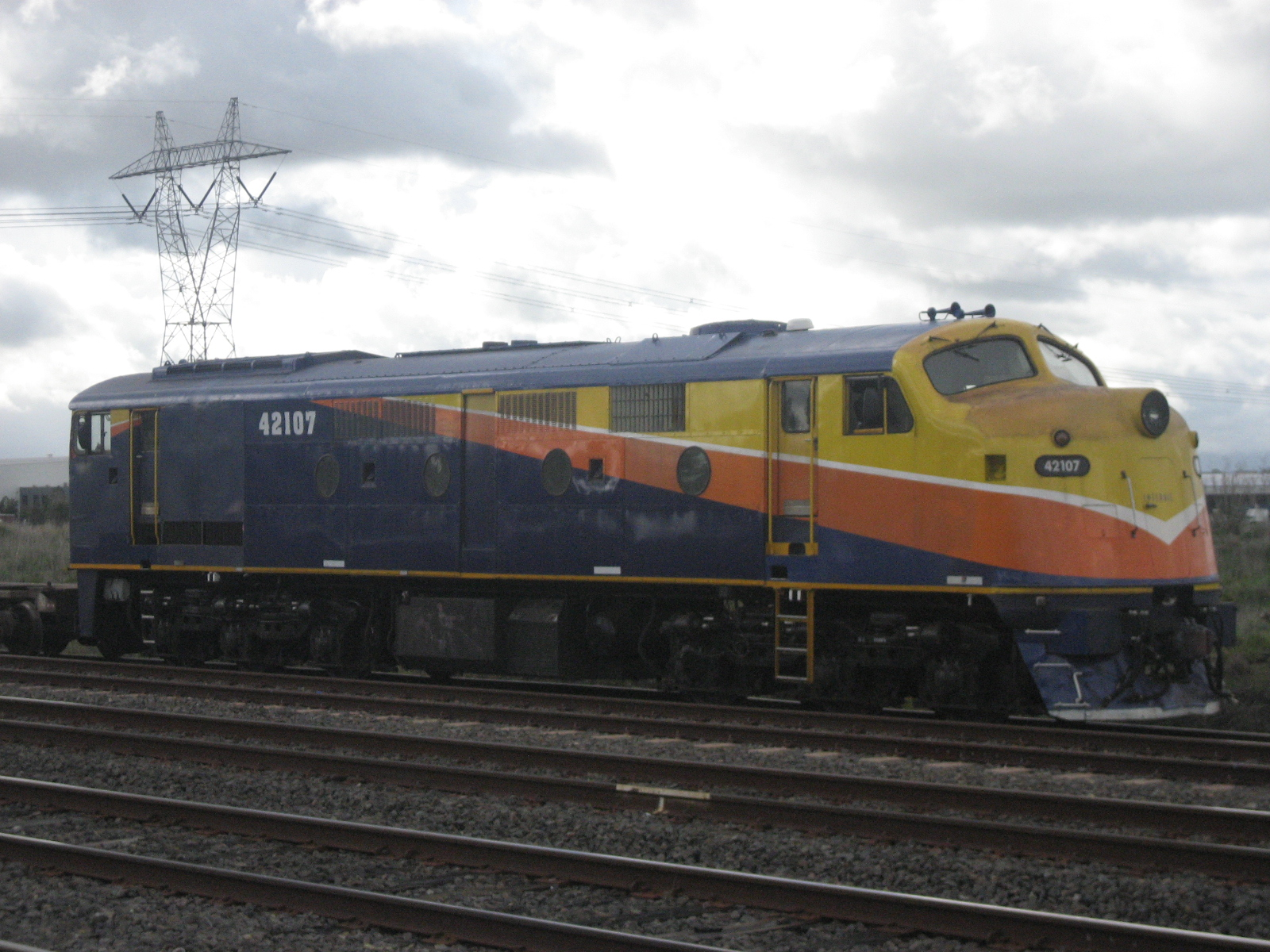
Interail 42107 in Somerton, Victoria in November 2007

In September 1999, Queensland Rail was rebranded as QR. In March 2002, Queensland Rail purchased Northern Rivers Railroad and rebranded it Interail, fulfilling a long-held ambition of expanding beyond its state borders.

In March 2003, Queensland Rail entered the Hunter Valley coal market when Interail commenced a contract from Duralie Colliery to Stratford Mine. Another coal contract was won in late 2003 for the haulage of coal from Newstan Colliery, Fassifern to Vales Point Power Station. In 2004, Interail began running Brisbane to Melbourne and Sydney to Melbourne intermodal services. In June 2005, Queensland Rail acquired the CRT Group.

In June 2006, the Western Australian business of the Australian Railroad Group was purchased.

=== Privatisation and the current era ===
QR was responsible for all Queensland freight services, and from 2002 operated interstate services under the Australian Railroad Group, Interail and QR National brands. These were all spun out into a separate entity in July 2010, and later privatised as Aurizon.

In June 2009, the Queensland Government announced the privatisation of Queensland Rail's freight business. This resulted in Queensland Rail's freight assets being transferred to QR National (now Aurizon) from 1 July 2010.

In April 2013, the Queensland Parliament passed the Queensland Rail Transit Authority Bill 2013 that restructured Queensland Rail. The explanatory notes published for the bill outlined that the existing Queensland Rail Limited entity would remain although no longer be a government-owned corporation and that entity would become a subsidiary of a new Queensland Rail Transit Authority (QRTA), in effect creating a Queensland Rail group. Under the revised arrangements Queensland Rail Limited retained assets and liabilities and staff were transferred to the QRTA. As a result of transferring the staff to the QRTA, the government moved those employees from the federal industrial relations system to the state-based industrial relations system, giving the state more control over industrial arrangements. In November 2013, five labour unions commenced legal proceedings in the High Court of Australia alleging that the QRTA was subject to the federal industrial jurisdiction rather than the state system. In April 2015, the court ruled the QRTA was subject to the Fair Work Act 2009 and the federal industrial relations jurisdiction.

== Company leaders ==
=== Commissioners ===
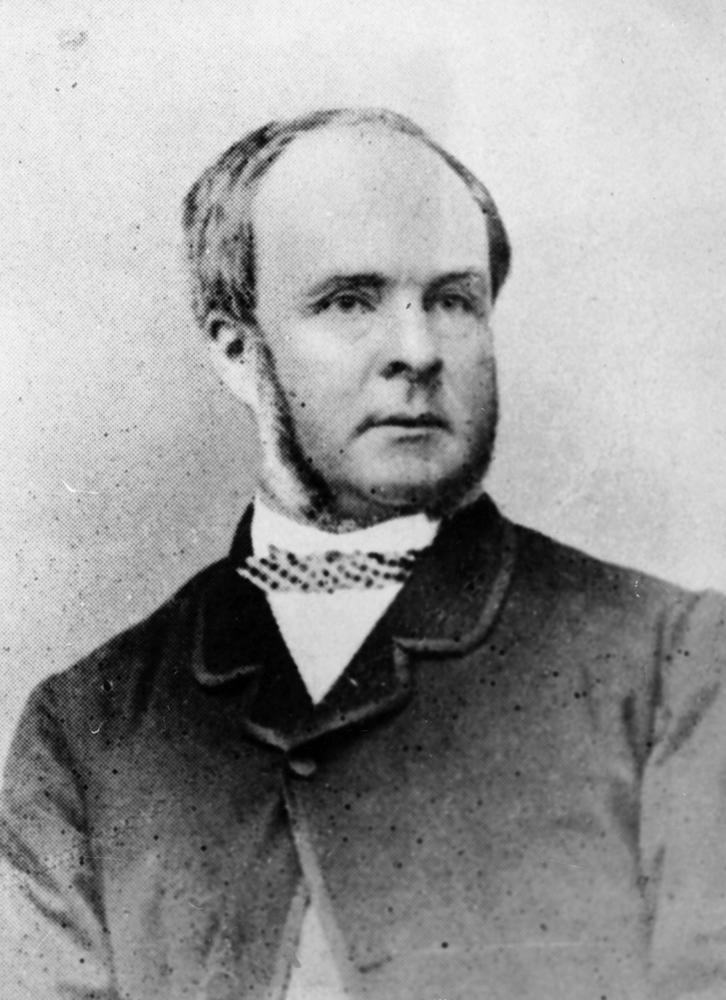
Abram Fitzgibbon, circa 1863

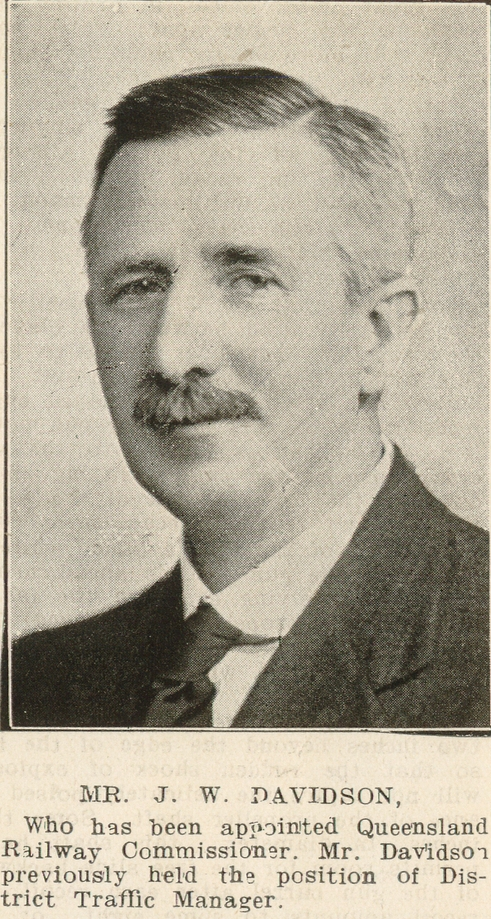
James Walker Davidson, 1918

The Commissioners of the Queensland Railways were:

- 23 December 1863 – October 1864: Abraham Fitzgibbon
- 28 October 1864 – 29 April 1869: Arthur Orpen Herbert

Note: from 29 April 1869 to 15 July 1870, the Secretary for Public Works was appointed Commissioner for Railways.

- 15 July 1870 – 12 March 1885: Arthur Orpen Herbert
- 12 March 1885 – 29 July 1889: Francis W. Curnow

Note: from 29 July 1889 a Board of three Commissioners was appointed to reduce political influence. This was reduced back to a single Commissioner in September 1895.

- 29 July 1889 – 30 June 1896: John Mathieson (Chief Commissioner)
- 29 July 1889 – September 1895: Robert John Gray (1st Assistant Commissioner)
- 29 July 1889 – 13 December 1894: Andrew Johnston (2nd Assistant Commissioner)
- 1 July 1896 – 30 September 1902: Robert John Gray
- 5 November 1902 – 24 March 1911: James Forsyth Thallon
- 30 March 1911 – 31 May 1911: Thomas Mulhall King
- 1 June 1911 – 31 October 1918: Barnard Charles Evans
- 1 November 1918 – 28 February 1938: James Walker Davidson
- 1 March 1938 – 28 February 1941: Curteis Anthony Murton
- 9 March 1941 – 27 February 1948: Percy Robert Turner Wills
- 1 March 1948 – 31 August 1952: Timothy Edward Maloney
- 1 September 1952 – 31 August 1962: Gerald Vincent Moriarty
- September 1962 – 4 July 1976: Alva George Lee
- 5 July 1976 – 17 December 1982: Percy James Goldston
- 13 January 1983 – April 1986: Douglas Vernon Mendoza
- 20 May 1986 – 31 July 1989: Ralph T. Sheehy
- 1 August 1989 – December 1989: Ross William Dunning
- December 1989 – 7 October 1990: Robin G. Read (Acting Commissioner)
- 8 October 1990 – 30 June 1991: Vincent John O'Rourke

Note: from 1 July 1991 the position of Commissioner for Railways ceased to exist, replaced by a Chief Executive Officer, reporting to a board of Directors.

=== Chief Executive Officers ===
Name	Tenure	Notes
Vincent John O'Rourke	July 1991 – December 2000	
Bob Scheuber	December 2000 – April 2007	
Stephen Cantwell	April 2007 – November 2007	
Lance Hockridge	November 2007 – 30 June 2010	
Paul Scurrah	1 July 2010 – 2 December 2011	From formation of revised Queensland Rail entity following Public float of QR National. Previously Executive General Manager of QR Passenger subsidiary.
James Benstead (acting)	December 2011 – August 2013	
Glen Dawe	August 2013– January 2014	
Helen Gluer	3 April 2014 – 27 October 2016	
Neil Scales	October 2016 – March 2017	
Nick Easy	March 2017– December 2021	
Katarzyna (Kat) Stapleton	April 2022 – present	

== Services ==
=== South East Queensland ===
QR operates urban and interurban rail services throughout South East Queensland as part of the Translink network. Rail services operate on twelve lines: Beenleigh, Brisbane Airport, Caboolture, Cleveland, Doomben, Ferny Grove, Ipswich/Rosewood, Kippa-Ring, Nambour/Gympie North, Shorncliffe, Springfield Central and Varsity Lakes. QR operate these with the Suburban Multiple Unit (SMU), Interurban Multiple Unit (IMU) and New Generation Rollingstock (NGR) electric multiple units.

=== Long-distance trains ===
Queensland Rail operate five long-distance passenger rail services, under the brand name Queensland Rail Travel (formerly Queensland Rail Traveltrain):

- Tilt Train: Brisbane to Rockhampton
- Spirit of Queensland: Brisbane to Cairns
- Spirit of the Outback: Brisbane to Longreach
- Westlander: Brisbane to Charleville
- Inlander: Townsville to Mount Isa

Connecting road coach services are operated.

Annual patronage all travel and tourism servies in 2022–23 was 690,000. In 2007/08, the subsidy for the Brisbane–Cairns route (NCL) was $130 million, or $900 per passenger. This represented a significant decline from 2001/02, when it was $270 million.

=== Tourist trains ===
Queensland Rail also operate two tourist services:

- Gulflander: Normanton to Croydon
- Kuranda Scenic Railway: Cairns to Kuranda

=== Former services ===
Queensland Rail operated many named trains including:

- Capricornian: Brisbane to Rockhampton, operated from 1970 until 1993 when replaced by the Spirit of the Outback
- Great South Pacific Express: Kuranda to Sydney luxury train operated from 1999 until 2003
- The Midlander: Rockhampton to Winton, operated from 1954 until 1993 when replaced by the Spirit of the Outback
- Savannahlander: Cairns to Forsayth, operated from 1995 until 2004 when contracted out to a private operator
- Spirit of Capricorn: Brisbane to Rockhampton, operated from 1988 until 2003
- The Sunlander: Brisbane to Cairns, operated from 1953 until 2014 when replaced by the Spirit of Queensland

== Rolling stock ==
In 1936, the company owned 750 locomotives, 67 railcars, 998 coaches, 94 mail cars, 177 brake vans and 18,699 freight cars.

QR sourced steam locomotives from many manufacturers including Armstrong Whitworth, Avonside Engine Company, Beyer, Peacock & Company, Dübs & Co, Kitson & Co, Nasmyth, Wilson & Co, Neilson and Company, North British Locomotive Company, Vulcan Foundry and Yorkshire Engine Company all of the United Kingdom, Baldwin Locomotive Works of the United States, as well as Australian manufacturers Clyde Engineering, Evans, Anderson, Phelan & Co, Islington Railway Workshops, Newport Workshops, Phoenix Engine Company, Toowoomba Foundry and Walkers Limited. It also built some in-house at North Ipswich Railway Workshops.

Dieselisation commenced in 1952 with early purchases being imported from GE Transportation and English Electric, before standardising on locally made products from A Goninan & Co, Clyde Engineering, English Electric and Walkers Limited. Electric locomotives were purchased from Clyde Engineering, Walkers Limited and Siemens. Electric multiple units have been purchased from Walkers Limited, Downer Rail and Bombardier Transportation, the latter of two which are still present in Queensland.

With the closure of many rural branch lines in the 1990s there was excess motive power on the QR and it was chosen to standardise by using Clyde based diesel locomotives. Most, if not all of the English Electric locomotives were withdrawn by 2000.

In 2021, QR announced that it had shortlisted three applicants (Alstom, CAF and Downer Rail) to manufacture 65 new electric multiple units with each consists of six cars. In 2023, it was confirmed that the new six-car units would be built by Downer Rail, together with Hyundai Rotem being a joint venture partner, at a new state facility in Torbanlea, near Maryborough. The new units will allow for expansion of the fleet and retiring of the EMU and ICE units.

Class	Image (if applicable)	Type	Top speed (km/h)	Built	Number of units	Routes operated	Notes
Current city network fleet
SMU200		Electric multiple unit	100	1994–1995	12	City network (except Interurban services)	Units numbered 201–212 All units were refurbished from 2019 to 2024.
IMU100		Electric multiple unit	140	1996–1997	10	City network	Units numbered 101–110 All units were refurbished from 2019 to 2025.
SMU220		Electric multiple unit	100	1999–2001	30	City network (except Interurban services)	Units numbered 221–250
IMU120		Electric multiple unit	140	2001	4	City network	Units numbered 121–124
IMU160		Electric multiple unit	130	2006–2011	28	City network	Units numbered 161–188 All units are to be refurbished from 2022 - present, and fitted with ETCS equipment.
SMU260		Electric multiple unit	130	2008–2011	36	City network	Units numbered 261–296 All units are to be refurbished from 2022 - present, and fitted with ETCS equipment.
NGR700		Electric multiple unit	140	2015–2019	75	City network (except Ferny Grove & Rosewood)	Units numbered 701–775
Former city network fleet
EMU		Electric multiple unit	100	1979–1986	0	City network (except Interurban services)	As of July 2025, all EMU units have been retired.
ICE		Electric multiple unit	120	1988–1989	0	City network	As of November 2021, all ICE units have been retired.
Traveltrain fleet
Electric Tilt Train		Tilting electric multiple unit	160	1997	2	North Coast line	
Diesel Tilt Train		Tilting push-pull train	160	2003–2014	3	North Coast line	
Locomotive fleet^{1}
1720 class		Diesel locomotive	100	1966–1970	8 Operational 4 Stored 1 Under overhaul	Traveltrain services and infrastructure trains	The most common use for the 1720 Class is as secondary motive power on the Spirit of the Outback and the Westlander as well as the main motive power on the Kuranda Scenic Railway, the locomotives also see regular use on Infrastructure Trains. QR owned locomotives include 1724, 1725 (stored), 1732, 1734 (overhaul)*, 1738, 1744*, 1746, 1751 (stored)*, 1752 (stored), 1754 (stored), 1764*, 1771* and 1774* *Locomotives in Kuranda Scenic Railway livery
2170 class		Diesel locomotive	100	1982–1984	1 Operational	Traveltrain services and infrastructure trains	2195A is the only QR owned 2170 class.
2400 class		Diesel locomotive	100	1977–1978	4 Operational	Traveltrain services and infrastructure trains	QR owned locomotives include 2410, 2411, 2414 and 2415.
2470 class		Diesel locomotive	100	1980–1983	5 Operational	Traveltrain services and infrastructure trains	QR owned locomotives include 2472, 2473, 2474, 2485H and 2490H.
2900 class		Diesel locomotive	100	2022-2024	6 Operational	Traveltrain services and infrastructure trains	2901 converted from 2400 Class (2413) 2902, 2903 and 2905 converted from 2150 Class (2152, 2163, 2158) 2904 and 2906 converted from 2170 Class (2471, 2495H)
Tourist fleet
DL class		Diesel locomotive	50	1961	1	Gulflander	DL4 based at Normanton, used as backup for the Gulflander's RM 93. Underwent major maintenance at North Ipswich Railway Workshops in 2019.
45 hp rail motor		Railmotor	40	1931	1	Gulflander	RM60 based at Normanton, used for charters.
102 hp rail motor		Railmotor	50	1950	1	Gulflander	RM93 based at Normanton, used for weekly Gulflander service. RM93 was converted to the General Manager's Inspection Car for the Central Division in 1972. It was then modified back to full railmotor seating capacity in 1981, and arrived in Normanton in 1982.
1800 class		Railmotor (trailers)	50	1952–1954	2	Gulflander	TP1809 is used on the Gulflander tourist railway as a trailer car. TP1811 was originally designated as RM1811, meaning it was a power car. It was formerly used as the commissioner's car and retains its upgraded suspension.
Heritage fleet
A10 class		Steam locomotive	50	1865–1866	1 Operational 1 Stored		No. 6 operational, Australia's oldest operational steam locomotive. No. 3 lasted in service until 1914, and has been retained for preservation and displayed at several locations; it is currently being restored to operation at the North Ipswich Railway Workshops.
B13 class		Steam locomotive	50	1883–1895	1		No. 48 stored in a shed at the North Ipswich Railway Workshops and awaits removal of boiler lagging and repainting before it can be publicly displayed.
B15 class		Steam locomotive	65	1889–1899	1		No. 290 stored in a shed at the North Ipswich Railway Workshops and is awaiting removal of boiler lagging and repainting before it can be publicly displayed.
PB15 class		Steam locomotive	65	1899–1926	2		No. 732 stored. No. 444 now displayed at the entrance to the Workshops Rail Museum.
B13 1/2 class		Steam locomotive	50	1904–1905	1		No. 398 known as 'Pompey' is stored in bogie shop after being displayed outside at the Workshops Rail Museum.
C17 class		Steam locomotive	80	1920–1953	1 Operational 2 Stored		No. 974 Operational. No. 1000 being restored to working order. Unfortunately this effort had apparently stalled due to the need for a new welded boiler (similar to 971/974's). No. 2 stored in a shed at the North Ipswich Railway Workshops awaiting removal of boiler lagging and repainting before it can be publicly displayed.
C19 class		Steam locomotive	80	1922–1935	1		No. 700 stored in a shed at the North Ipswich Railway Workshops awaiting removal of boiler lagging and repainting before it can be publicly displayed.
B18¼ class		Steam locomotive	80	1926–1947	1		No. 771 stored in a shed at the North Ipswich Railway Workshops awaiting removal of boiler lagging and repainting before it can be publicly displayed.
DL class		Diesel locomotive	50	1939	1		On display at the Workshops Rail Museum when not required. Queensland's first diesel locomotive. Currently not operational.
AC16 class		Steam locomotive	80	1943	1 Operational		No. 221A operational. (USATC S118 Class)
DD17 class		Steam locomotive	80	1948–1952	1		No. 1051 is awaiting final reassembly after undertaking heavy overhaul including brakes, a welded boiler and cabin.
Beyer-Garratt		Steam locomotive	80	1950–1951	1		No. 1009 on loan to the adjacent Workshops Rail Museum. As a permanent exhibition in the museum.
BB18¼ class		Steam locomotive	80	1950–1958	2 Operational		No. 1079 & 1089 operational.
1150 class		Diesel locomotive	80	1952	1		1159 stored pending restoration.
1170 class		Diesel locomotive	80	1956	1		1170 stored pending restoration.
1900 class		Railmotor	80	1956	1		1901 operational, also used as inspection and hired tourist vehicles.
2000 class		Railmotor	80	1956–1971	6		2034 and 2036 operational, on lease to Longreach based Outback Rail Adventure. 2057 stored awaiting certification for new internal modifications; including Disabled Access and Toilet facilities. 2005 is currently stored.
1200 class		Diesel locomotive	80	1953–1954	1		1200 stored pending restoration.
1250 class		Diesel locomotive	80	1959	2		1262 on display at Workshops Rail Museum. 1263 donated by ARHS(QLD). Stored in Townsville pending transport.
SX carriages		Passenger car	80	1961–1962	7		Set 45 formed into one 7-car set. Currently stored awaiting underframe work. A second set is also on site. SXV from Set 38 stored in bogie shop.
1460 class		Diesel locomotive	80	1964	1		1461 awaiting completion of mechanical restoration.
1270 class		Diesel locomotive	80	1964	2		1270 stored pending restoration. 1281 is on display, in good mechanical condition, at the Workshops Rail Museum.
DH class		Diesel locomotive	50	1966	1		DH2 disassembled from previous restoration attempt.
1620 class		Diesel locomotive	80	1967	3		1620 stored indefinitely after major failure requiring rewiring and engine work. 1650 donated by ARHS(QLD). Stored in good condition after partial restoration initiated by the previous custodian. 1651 donated by ARHS(QLD). Stored pending restoration.
Special fleet
		Vice-Regal Car	80	1903	1		Car 445 is a special saloon retained for use by the Governor of Queensland and is considered a working item of rollingstock in the QR fleet, however it is on permanent loan to Workshops Rail Museum.

^{1} This table only includes locomotives owned by Queensland Rail. QR also hires locomotives from Aurizon as required.

== Workshops ==
From its inception, QR's primary workshops were the North Ipswich Railway Workshops. It was replaced by the Redbank Railway Workshops in the 1960s. The Mayne Yard rail precinct is now the forefront for the repairs and maintenance of the fleet.

== Incidents ==
Notable incidents involving Queensland Rail include:

- On 9 June 1925, 9 people were killed in an accident near Traveston, atop a timber trestle bridge aboard the Rockhampton Mail service. The train was reported to have derailed, causing 2 cars (1 Passenger Car, and 1 Baggage Car) to fall into the Traveston Creek. The incident overall caused 9 fatalities and over 50 injuries.
- On 5 May 1947, a crowded charter train de-railed and crashed near Camp Mountain due to excessive speeds down a hill and a bend with 16 deaths. This accident is still the worst "loss of life" accident in Qld Rail history.
- On 25 February 1960, the East Bound Midlander derailed and crashed 1.5 km away from Bogantungan (Located Between Emerald and Barcaldine) on what is now called Spirit of the Outback Service. Floodwaters, had washed away a tree which hit some pylons holding the Medway Creek Bridge up. The east bound train hauled by two C17 locomotives, at the time had 120 passengers on-board. When the service arrived at the bridge at 2:32am, it plunged 7 – 1/2M into the creek bed after the bridge gave way. Floodwater quickly filled carriages. Both locomotives ended up in the water, as well as three passenger cars. Overall, seven People lost their lives and 43 people were injured. The Medway Creek disaster is seen as the worst in QR's History.
- On 23 March 1985, two passenger trains collided head-on near Trinder Park station on the Beenleigh line. Two people died (one of whom was the driver of the south-bound train), and 31 people sustained injuries. Affected units EMU11 and EMU27 were both travelling concurrently on the single track section of the line, despite several "fail-safe" measures and the use of RCS (remote control signalling).
- On 21 September 2001, EMU units 05 and 60 collided with a cattle train near Petrie, causing two carriages of Unit 05 and one carriage of Unit 60 to be scrapped, with the three remaining carriages merged to form EMU 60.
- On 15 November 2004, a Diesel Tilt Train VCQ5 derailed at Berajondo on the North Coast Line due to excessive speed resulting in injuries to over 100 people.
- On 14 September 2012, EMU41 collided with a heavy vehicle that became grounded on the level crossing at St Vincent's Road, Banyo, on the Shorncliffe line. The train driver performed all necessary braking measures, however they were not alerted in time and the train collided with the vehicle, causing extensive damage to the vehicle and the train (along with another train that was in the stationary near the crash). Injuries were sustained by both drivers.
- On 31 January 2013, IMU173 failed to stop at Cleveland station and collided with the station toilet block resulting in major damage to the train and minor injuries to several commuters and staff.
- On 18 June 2021, A Queensland Rail operated Train – at the time being used for driver training collided with a Loaded Aurizon Coal Train, at Westwood, West of Rockhampton. The incident occurred at 11:26am on an Aurizon operated trainline, while the locomotive was travelling to Bluff. The Queensland Rail Locomotive had three drivers onboard, two of whom suffered injuries. There was one fatality. The QR locomotive 2471 sustained severe damage, with the Aurizon locomotive sustaining less substantial damage.

On 14 August 2025, A passenger train carrying about 300+ civilians collided with a stuck B-double truck at the Bonemill Road level crossing attempting to turn on to Beenleigh Road in Runcorn.

== Criticism and controversy ==
=== Sunlander 14 ===
In December 2014, the Queensland Audit Office published a report about QR's Sunlander 14 project. The Sunlander 14 project had a scope to acquire a total of 25 carriages to replace The Sunlander passenger train with a new Diesel Tilt Train, purchase additional luxury cars, for the two existing Diesel Tilt Trains and refurbish their existing carriages.

The project was initially costed at $195 million and allowed for the operation of five services a week. However, costs had risen by 2012, and the Queensland Auditor-General reported that the eventual cost would be from $358 to $404 million, because QR had failed to take into account the requirement for upgraded maintenance facilities, as well as en route provisioning. The Auditor-General also believed, due to issues with the business case that QR had overestimated how popular the new service would be, and had a mistaken belief that the 'luxury' component of the train would attract more high-paying customers.

In 2013, the project was scaled back, with the train length being reduced to nine cars by removing the luxury sleepers and restaurant cars. That resulted in a revised project cost of $204 million. The Auditor-General's report in particular highlighted that due to the fixed-price construction contract the cost per train car increased and that opportunities were missed to pursue broader long distance train fleet renewal.

=== Redcliffe Peninsula railway line and subsequent driver shortages ===
The Redcliffe Peninsula railway line opened on 4 October 2016 and created a revised timetable that resulted in a 9% increase in services across the network. Queensland Rail did not have sufficient traincrew to operate the increased services. On 21 October a substantial interruption of service occurred involving the cancellation without notice of 167 services (12% of the scheduled services for the day) due to compulsory rest periods required for the train crew (a break of at least 32 hours required when a crew member has worked 11 consecutive days or 14 consecutive shifts).

Following the service interruptions, the head of the train service delivery unit was stood down. and an interim timetable implemented that reversed the increase in services and demand for traincrew. Several weeks after the service interruptions, Queensland Rail CEO Helen Gluer announced her resignation from the company, along with chairman Michael Klug. It was announced on 27 October 2016, that the Director-General of the Department of Transport and Main Roads, Neil Scales, would replace Helen Gluer and that an inquiry known as the Queensland Rail Train Crewing Practices Investigation would be led by Phillip Strachan into the events.

On 25 December 2016, another substantial service cancellation event occurred due to a lack of available traincrew to operate the services. On that day, 261 services, or 36% of scheduled services did not operate. The underlying reason for the cancellations was a lack of available drivers to operate services. Queensland Rail's Chief Operating Officer resigned several days later.

The inquiry into Queensland Rail's train crewing conducted by Phillip Strachan was completed in February 2017. The report made a number of findings and provided 36 recommendations that the Queensland Government accepted. The findings included that Queensland Rail had experienced a 9% increase in demand for traincrew due to the revised timetable while also experiencing a 7% decrease in traincrew productivity as a result of revised industrial arrangements, had intentionally operated for a number of years with an under-supply of traincrew and utilised the shortfall to provide paid overtime opportunities, had reduced train crew intake during 2014–15 in the lead-up to the opening of the new line, had restrictions on external recruitment and had a longer driver training period than like organisations. The report also highlighted unclear governance arrangements and a short term focus within the operations section that relied on intuition rather than accurate forecasting and a reluctance to share bad news as contributing factors. The recommendations from the report centred around demand management, supply management, people and process management and governance arrangements.

Following the completion of the Strachan inquiry, Philip Strachan was appointed as Chair of the Queensland Rail Board replacing Acting Chair Nicole Hollows, who had been appointed following the resignation Michael Klug. A Citytrain Response Unit was established within the Department of Transport and Main Roads to oversee the implementation of the recommendations from the Strachan inquiry. The Citytrain Response Unit subsequently commissioned a whole of business review into the organisation that was conducted by Deutsche Bahn and delivered in July 2017 and published reports tracking the progress of the implementation of the recommendations. Executive bonus payments were also suspended for 2017.

== See also ==
- Rail transport in Queensland
- Aurizon
