= Queensland Railways 1720 class =

Class of Australian Co′Co′ diesel-electric locomotives

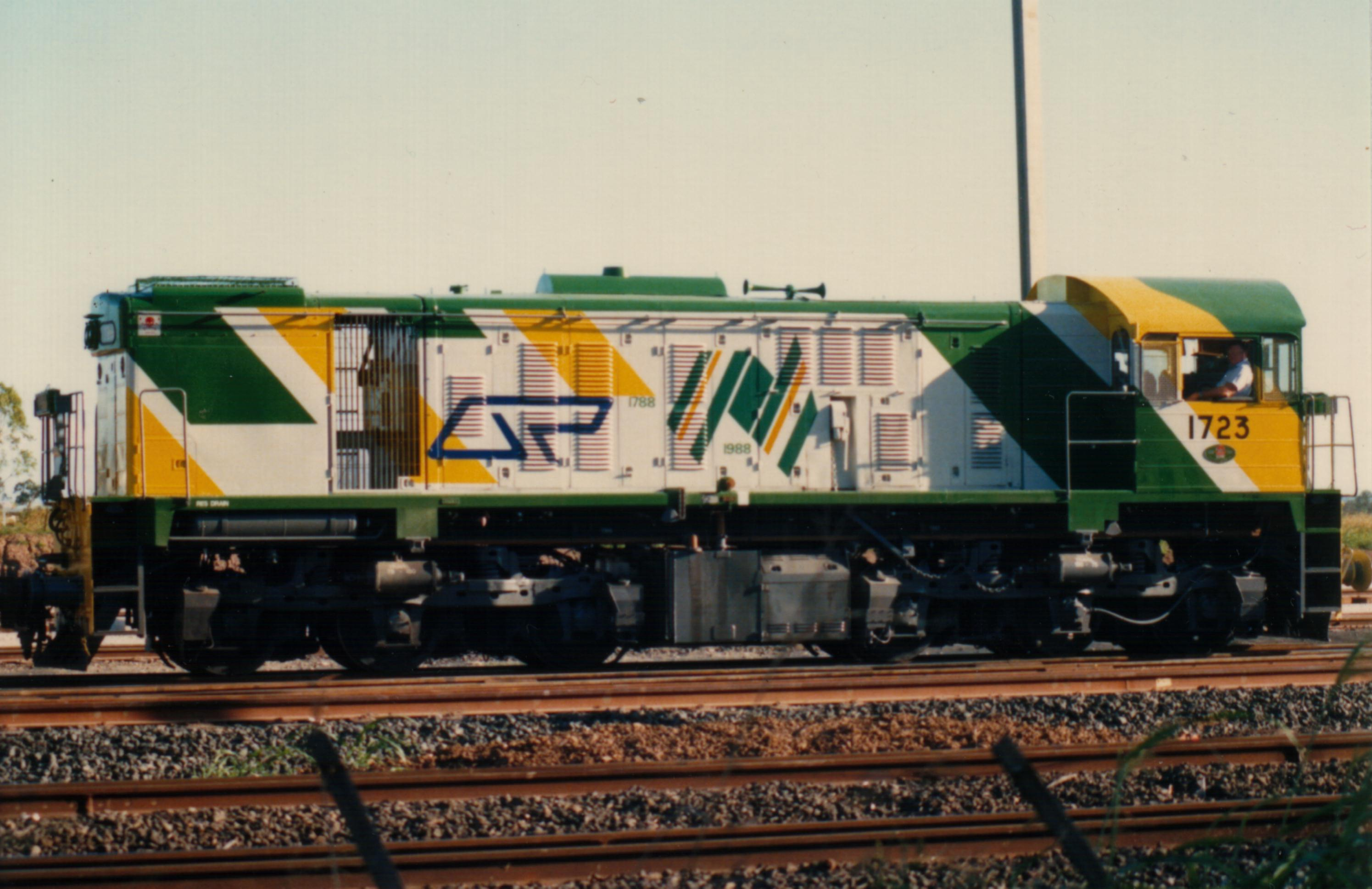
- Bicentennial liveried 1723 at Moolabin Yard railway station in February 1988
Type and origin
- Power type: Diesel-electric
- Builder: Clyde Engineering, Eagle Farm
- Model: Electro-Motive Diesel GL18C
- Build date: 1966–1970
- Total produced: 56
Specifications
- Configuration
  - AAR: C-C
  - UIC: Co′Co′
- Gauge: 1,067 mm (3 ft 6 in)
- Length: 13.4 metres (44 ft)
- Loco weight: 62 tonnes (61 long tons; 68 short tons)§
- Fuel type: Diesel
- Prime mover: Electro-Motive Diesel 645E
- Generator: Electro-Motive Diesel D25
- Traction motors: Electro-Motive Diesel CD36
- Cylinders: 8
Performance figures
- Maximum speed: 100 kilometres per hour (62 mph)
- Power output: 745 kilowatts (999 hp)
Career
- Operators: Queensland Railways
- Number in class: 56
- Numbers: 1720–1775
- First run: October 1966
- Current owner: Aurizon, Queensland Rail, Zig Zag Railway, Watco_Australia, Pacific_National
- Disposition: 33 in service, 10 stored, 12 exported, 2 preserved

Locomotive 1738 idling at Roma Street railway station, while waiting to depart with a long-distance passenger train
recorded 8 September 2018

The 1720 class are a class of diesel locomotives built between 1966 and 1970 by Clyde Engineering, Eagle Farm for Queensland Railways in Australia.

== History ==
The 1720 class were an evolution of the 1700 class. They operated throughout Queensland on branchline freight, suburban and mainline passenger services and on shunting duties. Later they were modified for driver only operation receiving a larger windscreen and an air conditioning box along with the D symbol added to the end of the locomotive number to indicate driver only operation.

Some have been exported, although the majority as at January 2014 remain in service. Unit 1741 was acquired for preservation by the Queensland Diesel Restoration Group in October 2016. As of June 2025, it is currently on the Zig Zag Railway in Clarence, NSW where it has been refurbished for use on their heritage railway. Unit 1745 is preserved under lease to QPSR

Watco Australia bought three units for use as cattle trains. These were renumbered as the WRE Class.

== Gallery ==
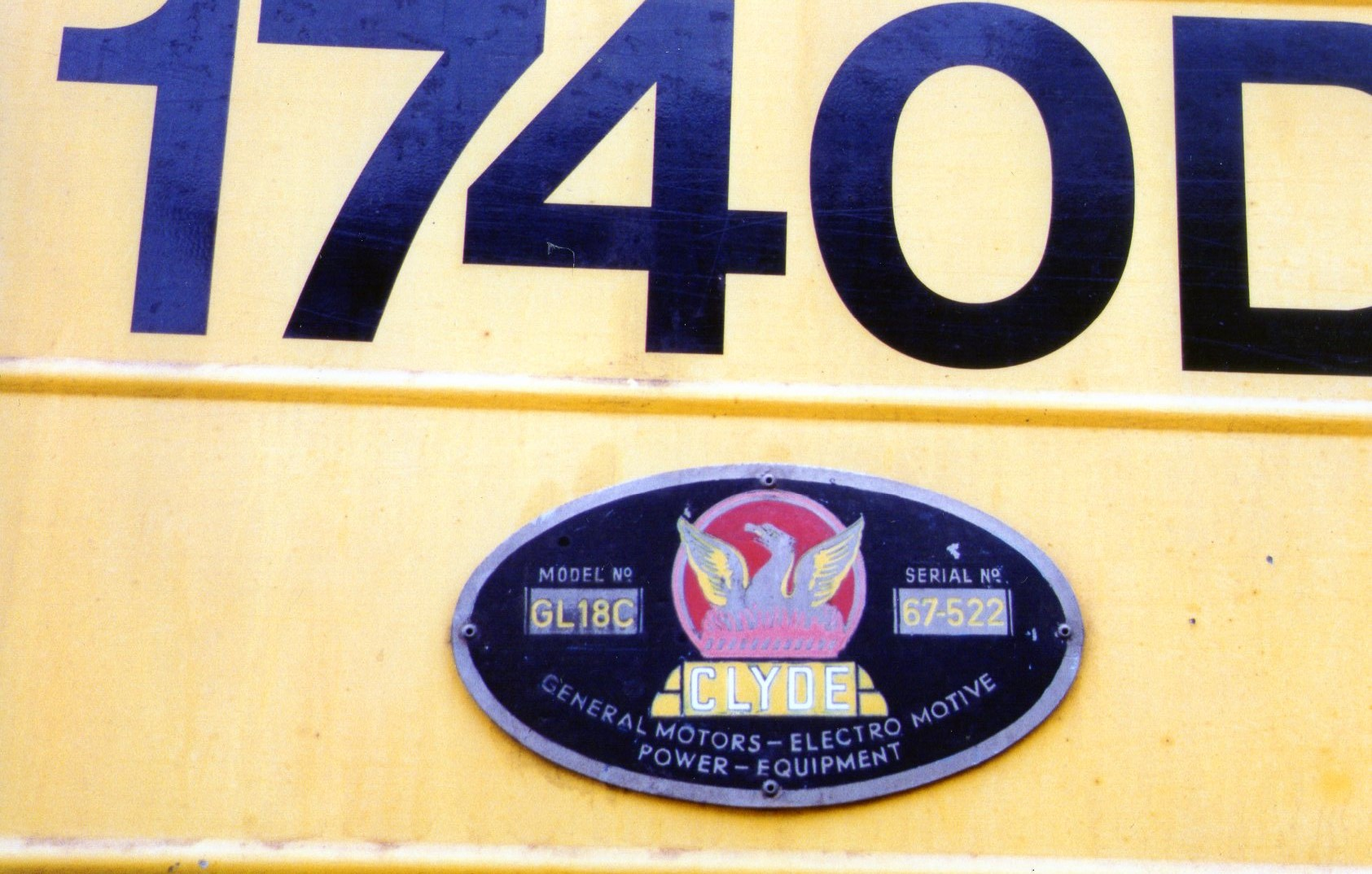
Clyde Engineering builder's plate on 1740

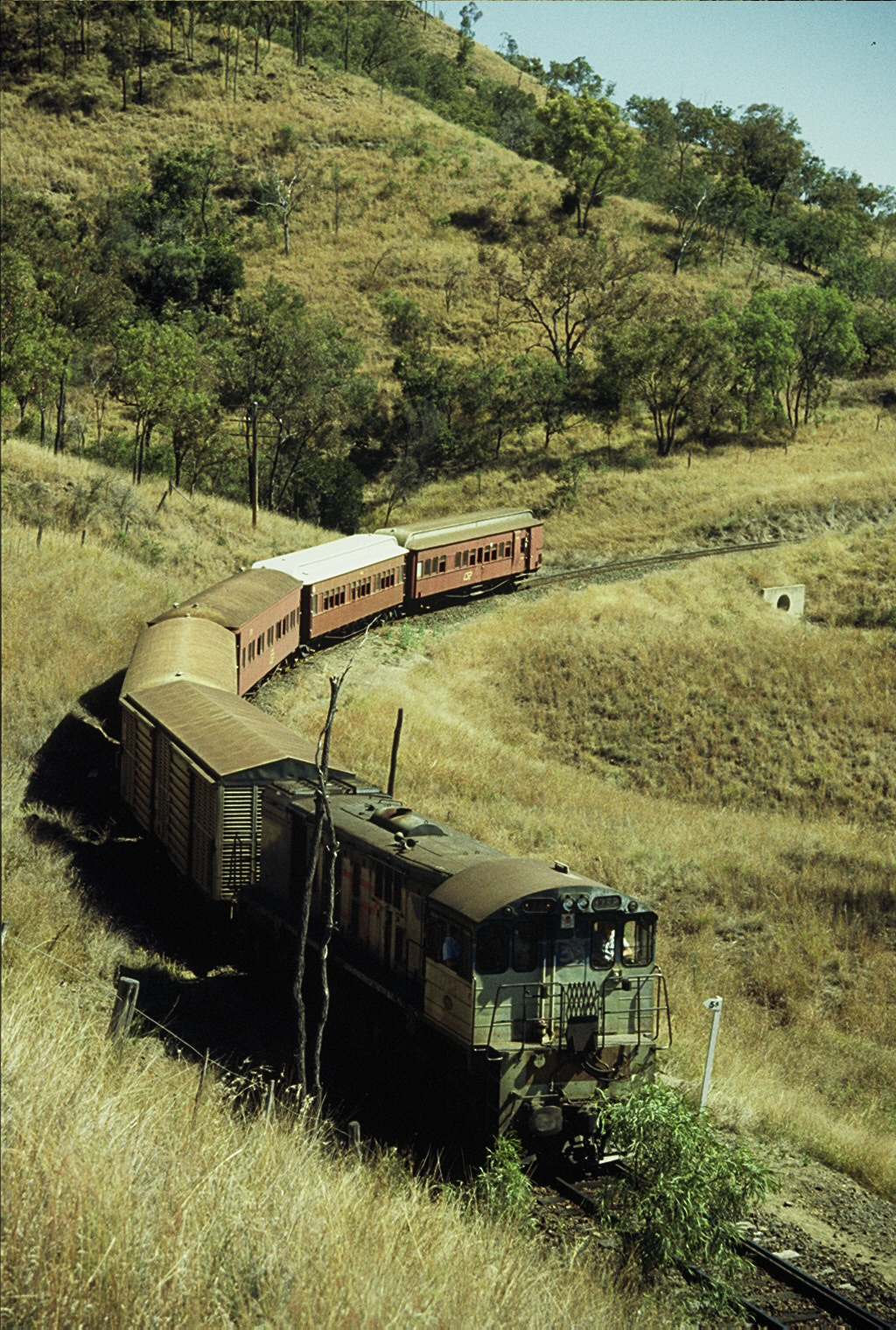
1732 near Bogantungan in September 1989

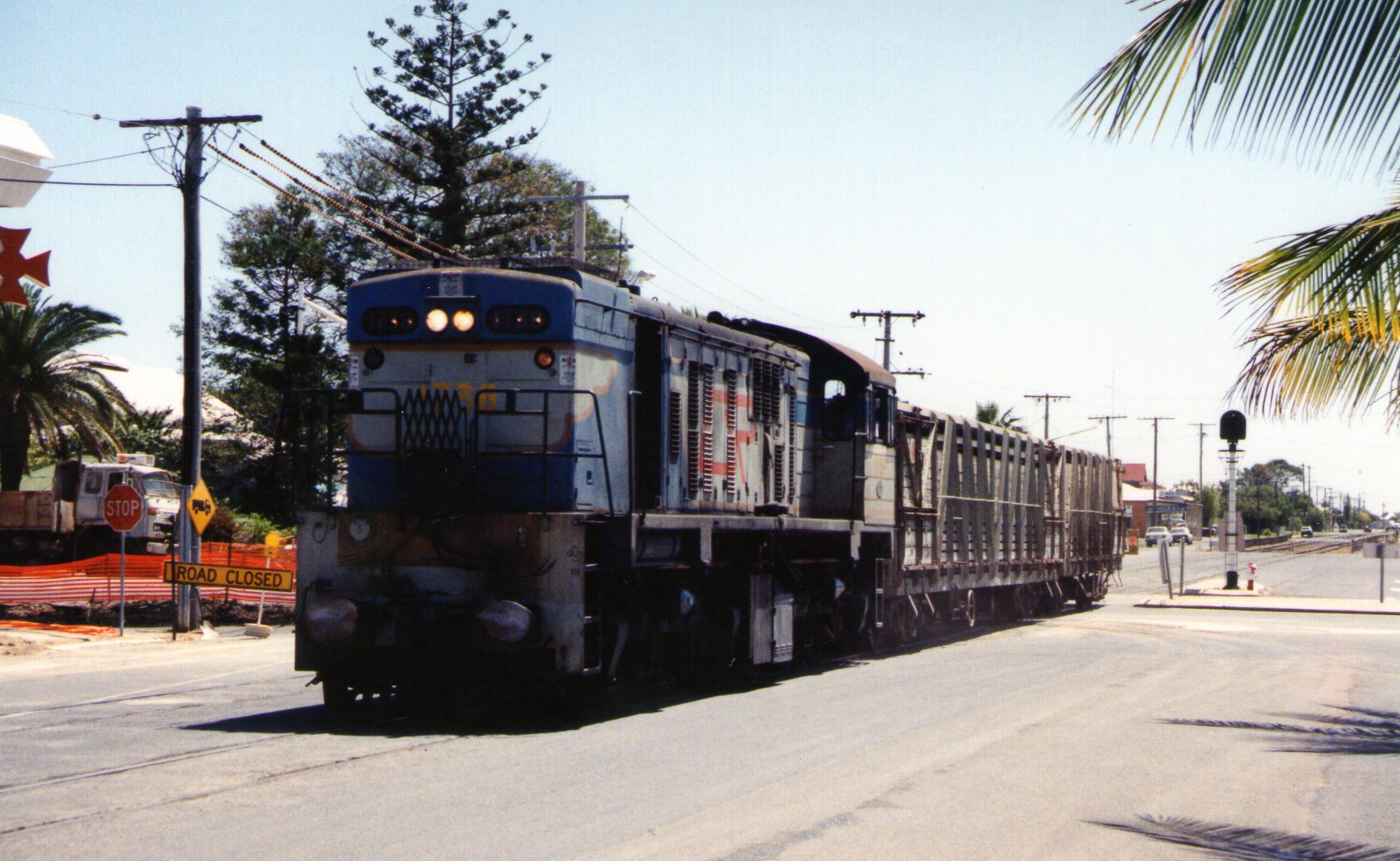
1738 in Rockhampton

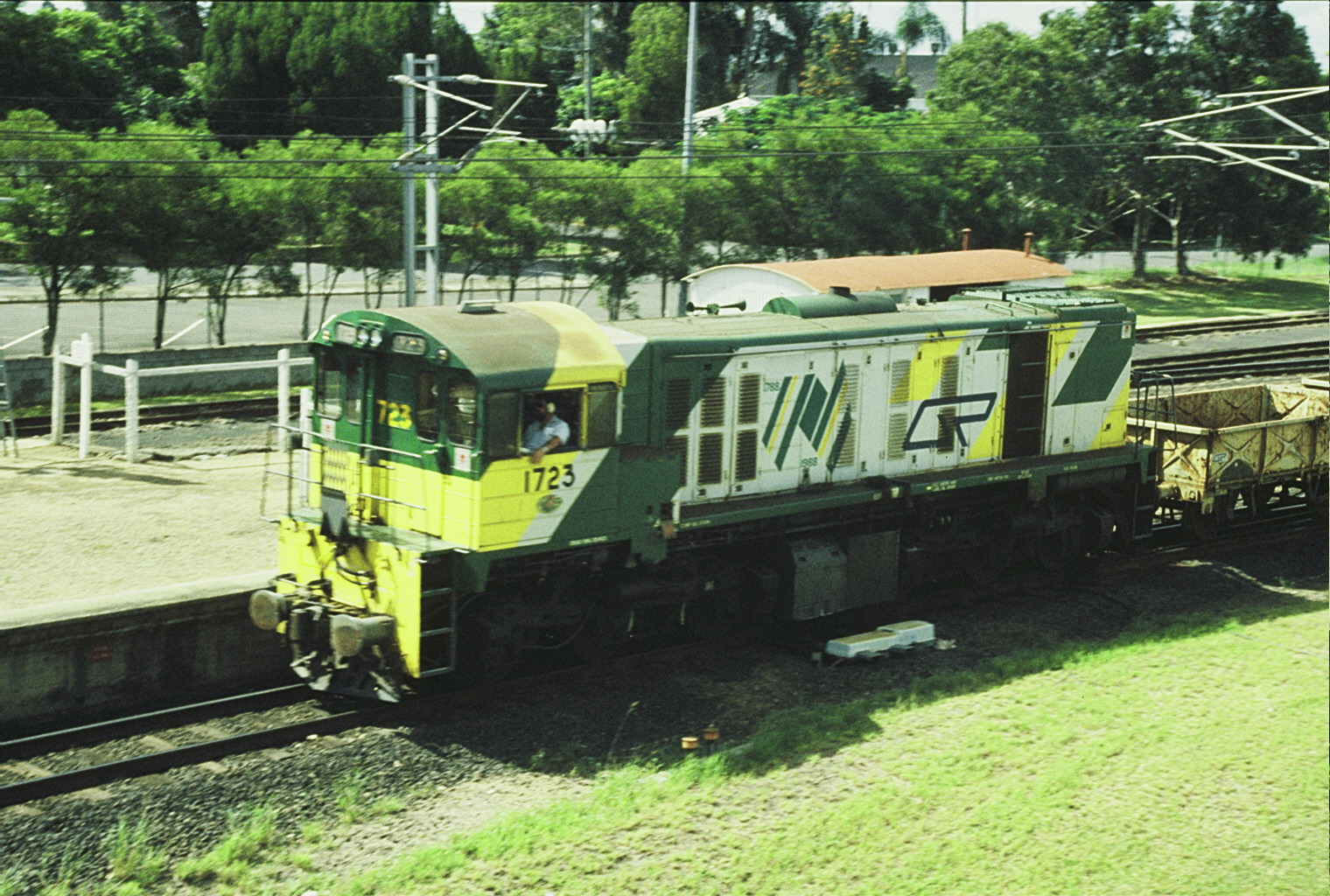
1723 in Bicentennial livery at Yeerongpilly in 1987

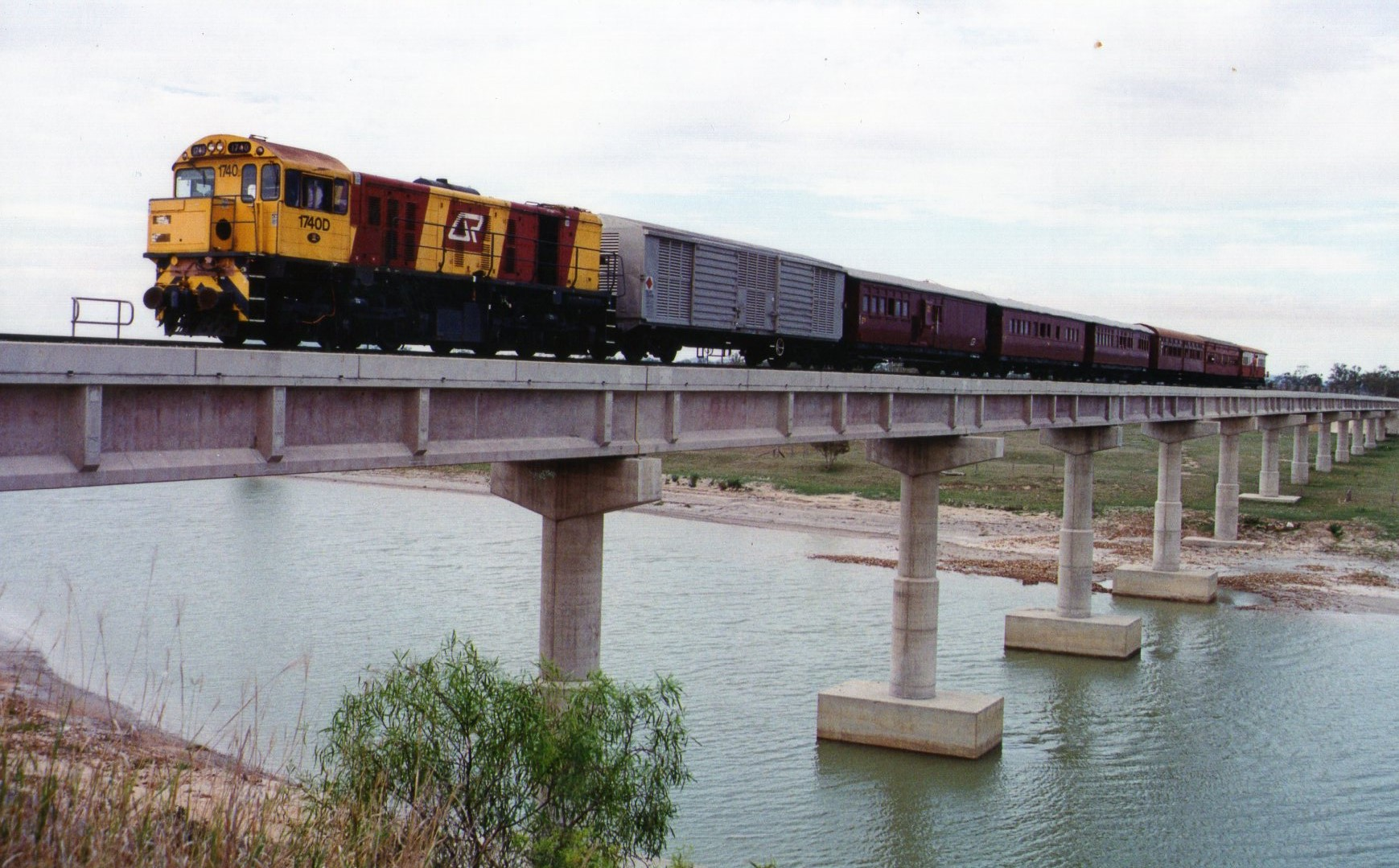
1740 crossing the Styx River in 1991

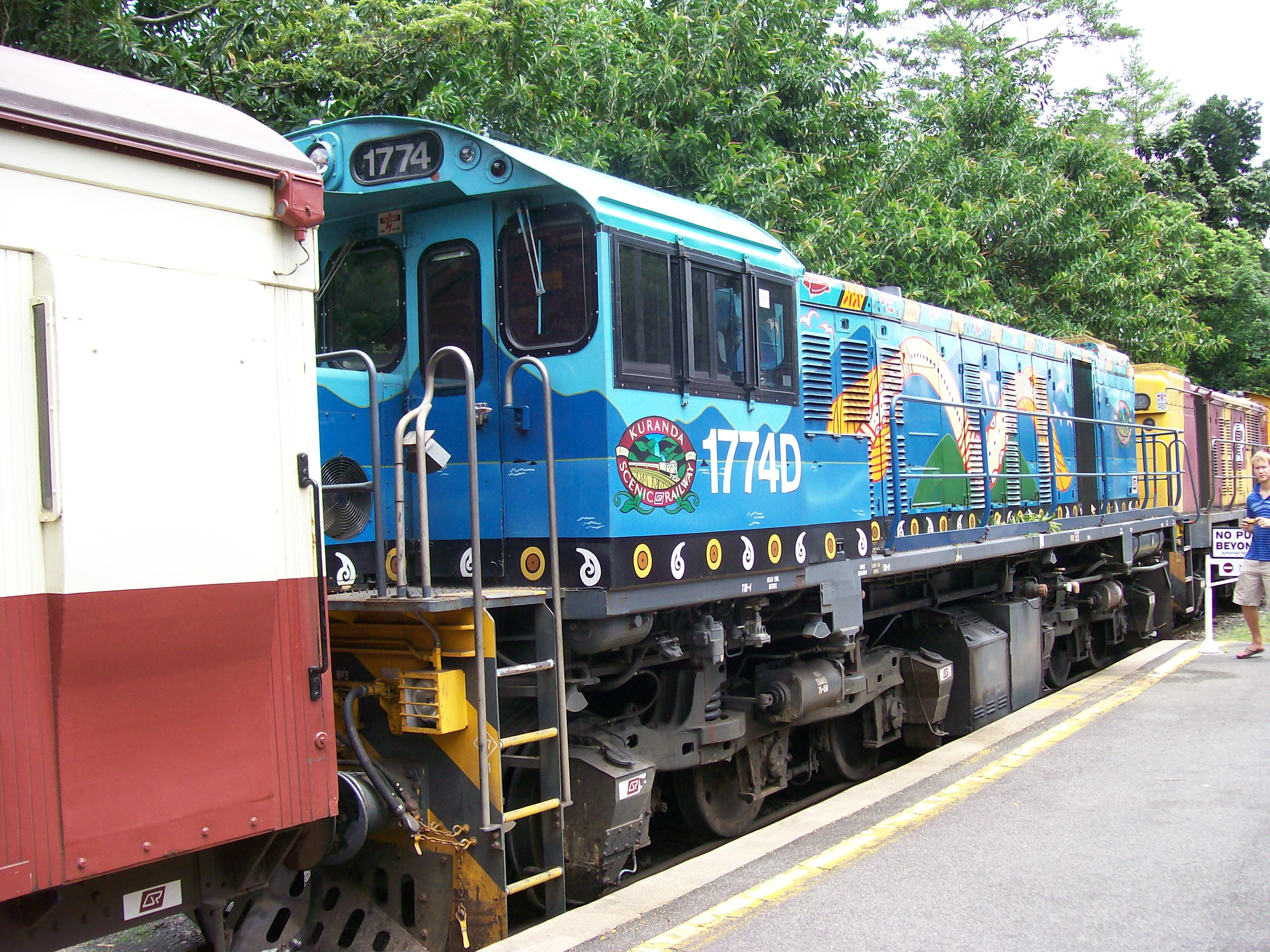
Kuranda Scenic Railway 1774 in December 2007

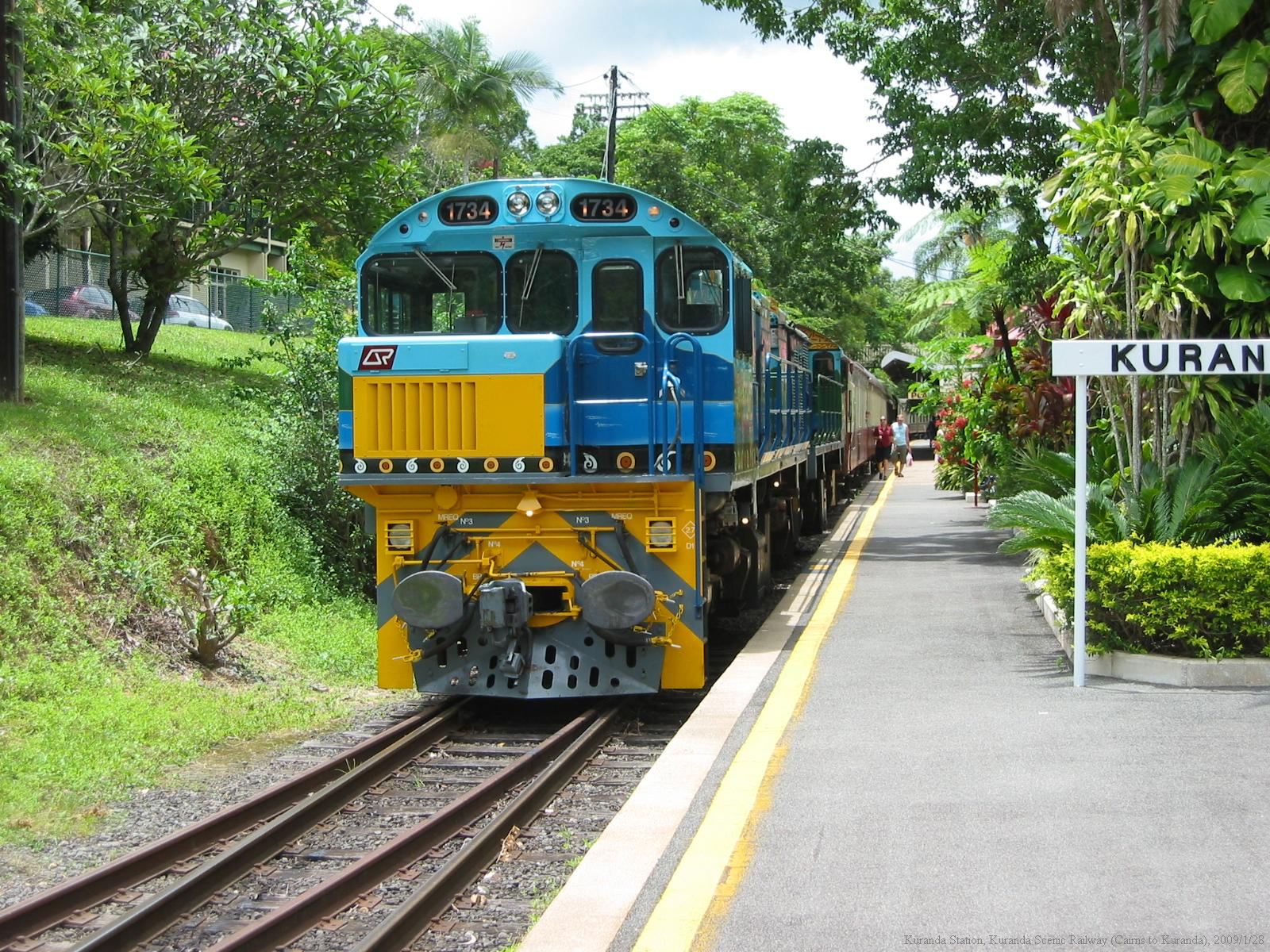
Kuranda Scenic Railway 1734 in January 2009

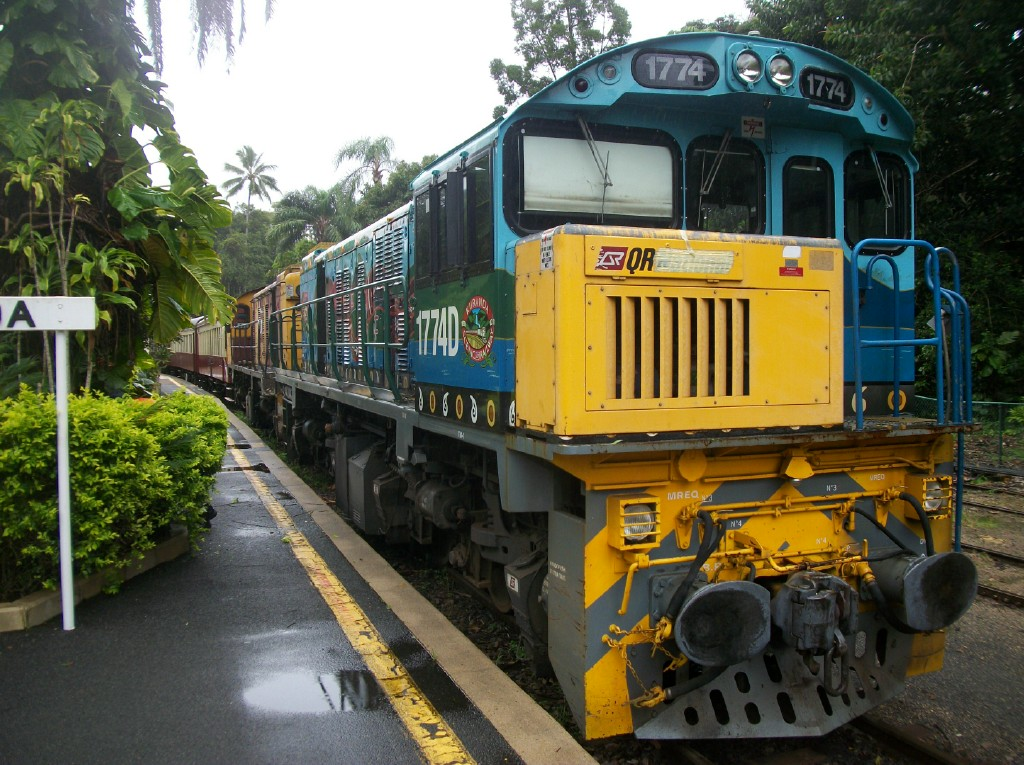
Kuranda Scenic Railway 1774 in April 2012
