= Agnes Adelaide Donaldson =

Australian botanical collector (1866–1948)

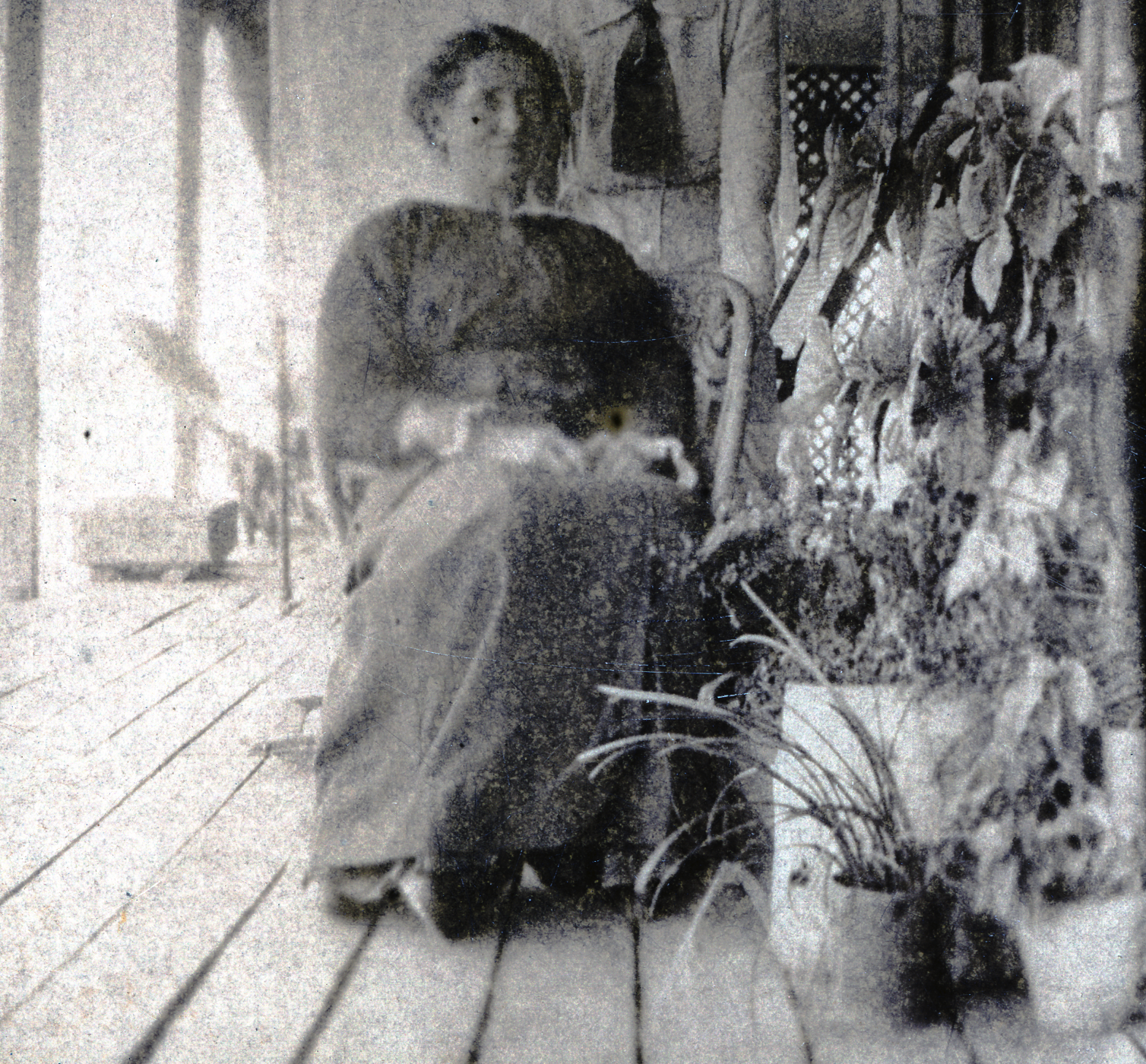
- Agnes Adelaide Donaldson, from a 1916 postcard.
- Born: 1866; Smeaton, Victoria, Australia
- Died: 11 July 1948 (aged 81–82); Rockhampton, Queensland, Australia
- Occupations: Botanical collector; governess; sheep station owner
- Years active: 1890–1891 (botanical collector)
- Spouse: Robert Donaldson (m. 1890)
- Children: 6

Agnes Adelaide Donaldson (née Elms; 1866–1948) was an Australian botanical collector, governess, and sheep station owner. Part of the expansive network of collectors established by Ferdinand von Mueller to botanically describe and categorise the flora of Australia, she was the earliest recorded woman, and one of the earliest recorded people, to collect plant material around Alpha in Queensland.

== Life ==
Donaldson was born to pastoralists Hastings Alfred Elms (1832–1910), and Janet Beveridge Elms (1838–1899) in Smeaton, Victoria. In the late 1880s, Agnes travelled to Lansdowne, Queensland to work as a governess at Lansdowne station. She met the station overseer Robert Donaldson, and they married in 1890 and they ultimately had three daughters and three sons.

After the wedding in Victoria, the Donaldsons travelled to Alpha pastoral station in Alpha, Queensland where Robert was the manager. At this time it is claimed that he employed Breaker Morant.

In 1898, leaseholders with large landholdings such as Robert Donaldson were barred from taking up new leases in districts that had been opened up by the Queensland colonial government. Agnes applied to select 19,677 acres and a waterhole, which was probably an attempt to evade the selection restrictions imposed on her husband. In 1910, this property was passed on to the Queensland pastoralist Eric Henry Mackay (1841–1923), and then his daughter Clara Miller. When "government enquiries" were made in the 1920s regarding the original "unethical occupation" of the property by Donaldson, the property was surrendered to bailiff.

They then moved to Medway homestead, Bogantungan in 1909, which Robert had purchased with a business partner. By 1914 this partnership had dissolved and Agnes stayed at the homestead while their son managed the property. Agnes's descendants have continued to manage the property into the present day, as a cattle stud. In 1946 she moved close to Rockhampton to receive medical treatment and died in July 1948.

== Botanical legacy ==
As part of Ferdinand von Mueller's plan to write a write a flora of Australia, he needed to recruit plant collectors from across the continent. He therefore advertised in regional Queensland newspapers, including in Rockhampton, requesting for people to send him plant specimens. It is possible that Agnes saw was recruited into Mueller's network by one of these advertisements, although no correspondence between them has survived.

Agnes collected botanical specimens at upper Belyando River, and Alpha Station in the early 1890s, forming an important record of past biodiversity in the region. Today her specimens are cared for in the collections of the National Herbarium of Victoria, Royal Botanic Gardens Victoria.
