= Medway Creek rail disaster =

1960 train crash in Australia

On 26 February 1960, the Midlander, a passenger train service that operated in Central Queensland, crashed while crossing over the bridge above Medway Creek, near Bogantungan, Queensland, Australia. The disaster occurred when the bridge collapsed after its pylons were severely damaged by a 12-tonne gum tree swept downstream in floodwaters, causing two steam locomotives and three sleeping cars to fall 7.6 metres into the flooded creek. Seven people were killed and 43 others were injured. Lawrence Murray, an Aboriginal railway fettler who assisted in rescuing survivors, was posthumously awarded the Queen's Commendation for Brave Conduct.

== Events ==
=== Incident ===
The disaster occurred at 2:30am when the train was passing over the bridge above the flooded Medway Creek. The pylons of the bridge had been severely damaged by the impact from a 12-tonne gum tree that had been swept downstream in the floodwaters. As the train crossed the creek, the bridge collapsed causing the two steam locomotives and three sleeping cars to fall 7.6 metres into the flooded creek. Seven people were killed including the driver, the fireman and a conductor as well as four passengers, including two children. Another 43 people were injured in the accident. A special train was organised to travel to the accident scene to assist. Emerald doctor, Charles Whitchurch, and a flying doctor from Mount Isa attended the scene.

=== Rescue ===
One of the people credited with helping save injured passengers, including 15 children, at the accident scene was Lawrence Murray, an Aboriginal railway fettler who had been travelling in the last carriage with his wife, children and grandchild. During the resulting investigation, a Board of Inquiry heard that Murray had rushed down to the wreckage which was partially submerged in the floodwaters and helped carry children to the creek bank before entering the other carriages to look for more survivors. Murray suffered minor injuries including gashes to his feet from broken glass after taking off his shoes while working to help survivors. Murray died of a heart attack following the accident, but was posthumously honoured with the Queen's Commendation for Brave Conduct, along with two other passengers, John Bennett and Alan Streeter.

=== Aftermath ===
Several anniversary commemorations have been held since the accident. A museum at Bogantungan displays memorabilia from the accident.
