= Public float of QR National =

Rail operations in Queensland, Australia

The QR National's "Be part of something big" poster used to promote the share offer.

In 2010, the Queensland Government split the government owned rail operator Queensland Rail into two companies: the government owned passenger operator Queensland Rail and the freight operator QR National (now Aurizon), the latter to be floated in late 2010.

== Public float ==
On 2 June 2009, the Queensland Government announced the 'Renewing Queensland Plan', with Queensland Rail's commercial activities to be separated from the Government's core passenger service responsibilities, and formed into a new company called QR National Limited. The new structure was announced by the State Government on 2 December 2009, and took place from 1 July 2010.

QR's coal, freight and infrastructure businesses was sold as an integrated enterprise, known as QR National Limited with headquarters in Brisbane. The new enterprise controls QR's coal business in Queensland and New South Wales, regional freight business in Queensland, bulk mineral and grain haulage in Western Australia and Queensland, and containerised freight between Cairns, Brisbane, Sydney, Melbourne, Adelaide and Perth. It also included a long-term 99-year lease over the railway lines that form the Queensland coal haulage network: the Newlands line to the port of Abbot Point, the Moura line to the Port of Gladstone, the Goonyella system based around the port of Hay Point, and the Blackwater system based around the Port of Gladstone, as well as network control responsibilities. The QR rollingstock workshops at Redbank, Rockhampton and Townsville were also included. The business model in the Queensland coalfields was to be similar to Class I railroads in North America, which are vertically integrated with ownership of the trains used to carry freight and the infrastructure they run upon.

The initial public offering of the freight and coal businesses occurred on 22 November 2010, with the sale raising $4.6 billion. QR employees who were part of the new entity had their jobs guaranteed for two years, and receive $1,000 worth of shares and the option to purchase an additional $4,000 of shares at a discounted price. The Queensland Government initially retained a 34% shareholding in the publicly floated company, with Queensland residents given preference in purchasing the remaining shares.

== Miners' bid ==
On 9 March 2010, a consortium of 13 mining companies with coal operations in Queensland, known as the Queensland Coal Industry Rail Group and headed by former NSW premier Nick Greiner, announced their intention to buy QR's coal rail network. The consortium made a formal $4.85 billion offer on 26 May for the tracks used exclusively or predominantly to haul export coal to port, and excluding QR's trains and freight businesses. If the bid is accepted the rail assets would be managed by the Australian Rail Track Corporation, a federal government owned body who manages the Australian interstate freight network. Premier Anna Bligh and Treasurer Andrew Fraser said it would consider the offer but believed a public float was the best option. The companies providing the equity included Anglo American, BHP Billiton, Ensham Resources, Felix Resources, Jellinbah Group, Macarthur Coal, Peabody Energy, Rio Tinto Coal Australia, Vale Australia, Wesfarmers and Xstrata; with Aquila Resources and New Hope Coal are supporting parties and may provide equity at a later stage. QR chief executive Lance Hockridge rejected the bid in June 2010, saying it is not in the best interests of the future expansion of the state's coal network. The consortium increased their bid for QR National to $5.2 billion on 10 August 2010 and the Queensland Government confirmed they are in negotiations with the consortium over this bid. During the negotiations the consortium received access to the QR National's financials. The negotiations ended when the consortium did not meet the deadline of 10 September 2010 for making a binding offer for QR National.

== Union action ==
=== Court case ===
On 11 June 2010, the Federal Court of Australia found that QR breached workplace agreements during the privatisation process, with workers not given the opportunity to discuss if they would be moved into the new private business, how the privatisation would occur, or if they wanted privatisation at all. On 22 June, the court fined QR a total of $660,000: QR Limited was fined $396,000, and its subsidiaries QR Passenger and QR Network were fined $231,00 and $33,000 respectively. The court action had been launched in February 2010 by the Australian Rail Tram & Bus Industry Union and four other unions with members working for QR.

== Separation and share offer ==
On 1 July 2010, the Queensland government separated QR National from QR Limited. Both Queensland Rail and QR National received a re-branding, with both getting a new logo and Queensland Rail getting new livery for the trains, new signage at stations, new staff uniforms and a new website. At the same time, the Queensland government announced new services, an overhaul of the timetables and a new focus on providing passenger rail transport and travel services for Queensland Rail.

The new passenger train business became a government-owned corporation known as Queensland Rail, with administrative headquarters in Ipswich. The government retained ownership of the passenger service business and assets, including commuter, long-distance and tourist passenger rail services, the metropolitan rail network, the regional freight network (excluding the tracks used for coal services), and the Workshops Rail Museum.

Pre-registration for the QR National share offer opened on 19 September 2010, with Queensland residents and smaller market players invited to pre-register. The Queensland government retained a 34% shareholding. The shares were listed on Australian Securities Exchange on 22 November 2010. By December 2013, the Queensland Government had reduced its shareholding to under 5%.
