= Queensland B18¼ class locomotive =

Class of Australian 4-6-2 locomotives

Queensland Railways B18¼ class
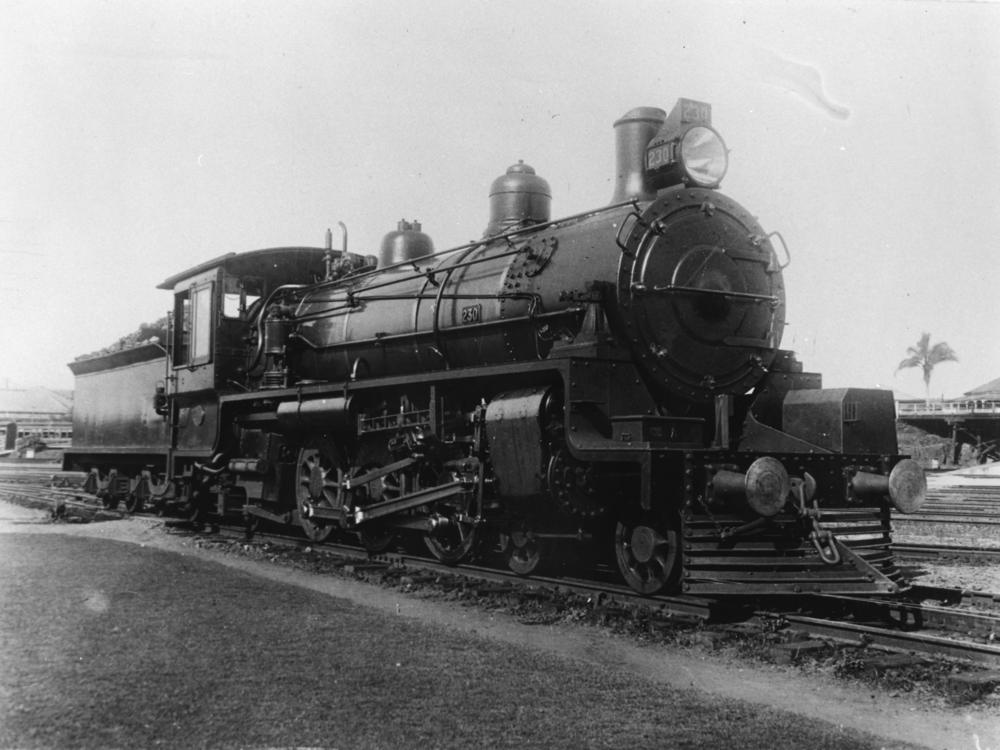
- 230
Type and origin
- Power type: Steam
- Builder: North Ipswich Railway Workshops (59); Walkers Limited (24)
- Build date: 1926-1947
- Total produced: 83
Specifications
- Configuration
  - Whyte: 4-6-2
- Gauge: 1,067 mm (3 ft 6 in)
- Driver dia.: 4 ft 3 in (1,295 mm)
- Loco weight: 56.3 long tons (63.1 short tons; 57.2 t)
- Tender weight: 36.9 long tons (41.3 short tons; 37.5 t)
- Fuel type: Coal
- Fuel capacity: 8 long tons (9.0 short tons; 8.1 t)
- Water cap.: 3,000 imp gal (14,000 L; 3,600 US gal)
- Firebox
  - Grate area: 25 sq ft (2.3 m^{2})
- Boiler pressure: 170 lbf/in^{2} (1,172 kPa)
- Heating surface
  - Tubes: 1,511 sq ft (140.4 m^{2}) (as built); 1,478 sq ft (137.3 m^{2}) (1935 reboilering); 1,414 sq ft (131.4 m^{2}) (1936 reboilering)
  - Total surface: 1,957 sq ft (181.8 m^{2}) (as built); 1,923 sq ft (178.7 m^{2}) (1935 reboilering); 1,859 sq ft (172.7 m^{2}) (1936 reboilering)
- Cylinders: 2 outside
- Cylinder size: 18.25 in × 24 in (464 mm × 610 mm)
- Valve gear: Walschaerts
Performance figures
- Maximum speed: 50 mph (80 km/h)
- Tractive effort: 22,648 lbf (100.7 kN)
- Factor of adh.: 3.54
Career
- Operators: Queensland Railways
- Numbers: 16, 18, 27, 28, 30, 40, 50, 52, 84, 227-232, 768-771, 827-830, 841-852, 864-881, 887-916
- Preserved: 771
- Disposition: 1 preserved, 82 scrapped

The Queensland Railways B18¼ class locomotive was a class of 4-6-2 steam locomotives operated by the Queensland Railways.

== History ==
The first batch of 17 B18¼ class locomotive were built by the North Ipswich Railway Workshops in 1926. Per Queensland Railway's classification system they were designated the B18 class, B representing they had three driving axles, and the 18 the cylinder diameter in inches.

Further orders saw the class total 83 by 1947 with some built by Walkers Limited. The latter examples were fitted with modified boilers and improved cabs. The early examples were painted prussian blue with the boilers having a natural finish. The latter examples were painted black with red lining. In 1949 all were repainted green with red lining. From 1951 they began to be relegated following the delivery of the BB18¼ class. The first was withdrawn in March 1967, with the last removed from traffic in 1970.

== Preservation ==
- 771 has been preserved at the Workshops Rail Museum.
