= The Midlander (Queensland Rail) =

Train in Australia

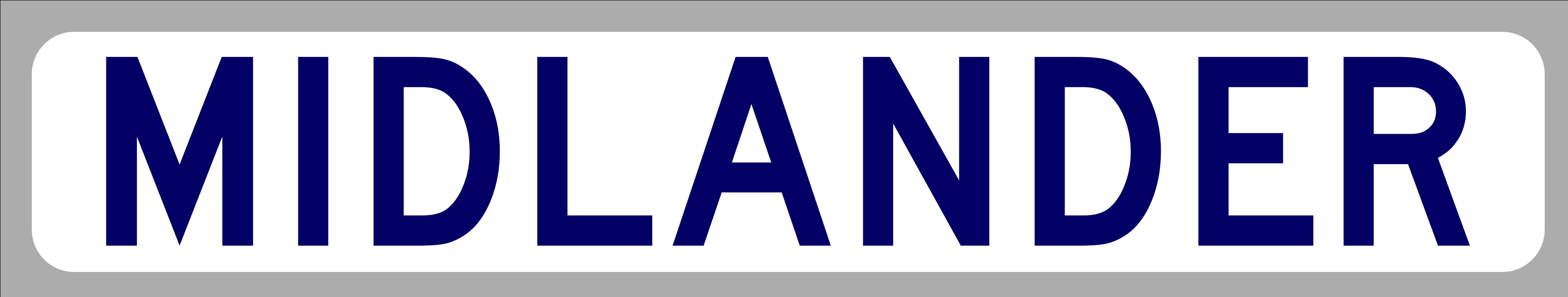

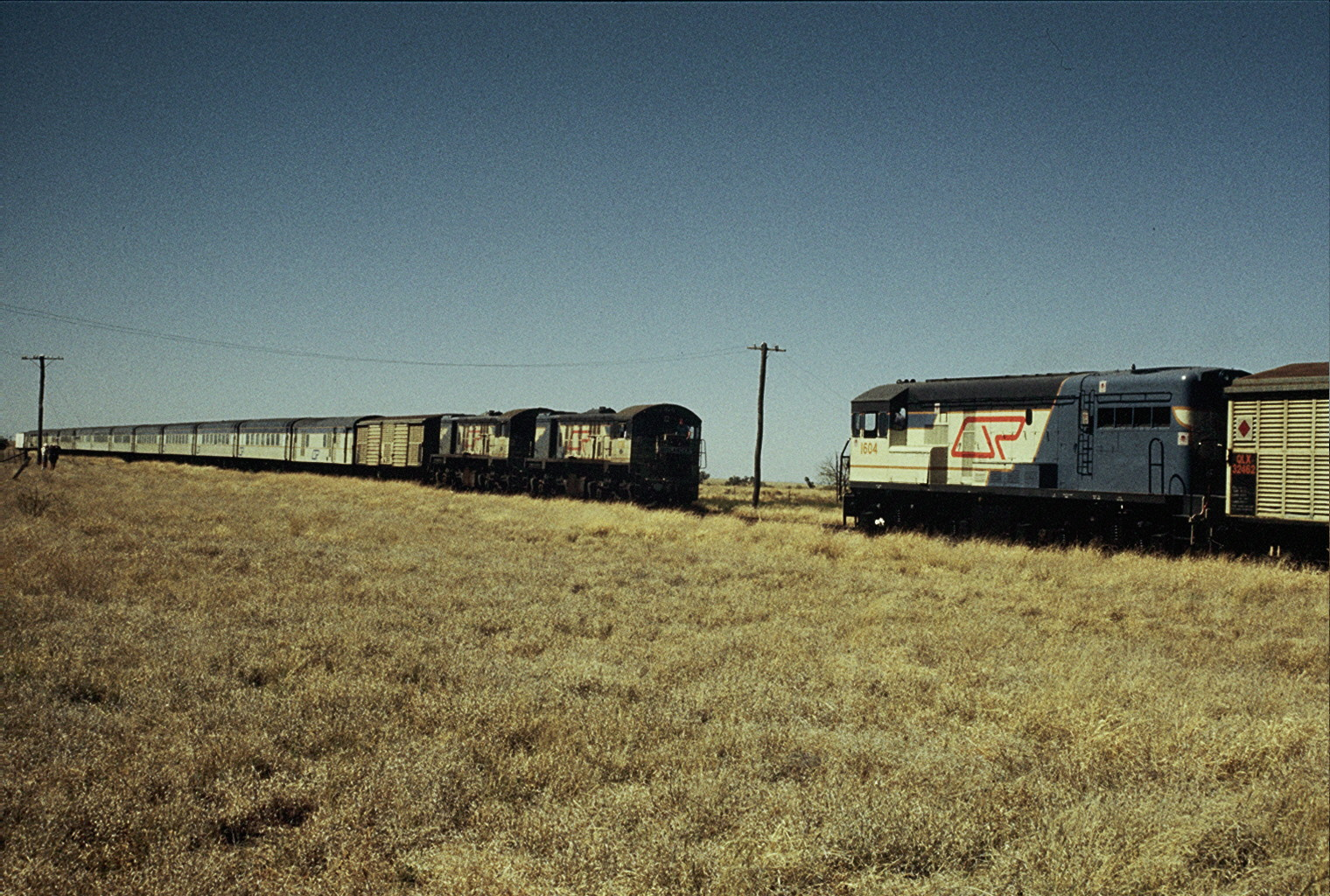
- 1604 crossing the westbound Midlander in September 1989

Overview
- Service type: Passenger Train
- Status: Replaced by other rail service and coach
- First service: 4 May 1954
- Last service: 1993

Route
- Termini: Rockhampton; Winton
- Line used: Central West line

Technical
- Track gauge: 1,067 mm (3 ft 6 in)

The Midlander was a passenger train that operated in Queensland, Australia between 1954 and 1993. It travelled on the Central West line between Rockhampton and Winton.

== History ==
At the time of opening of the Central West Line to Winton in 1928, a bi-weekly train ran from Longreach to Winton.

In the 1950s, Queensland Rail began introducing a fleet of steel air-conditioned carriages to be hauled by American built locomotives for its long distance services. In total eight trains were ordered, with the fifth being assigned to the Rockhampton - Winton route and given the name The Midlander.

Completing its initial run from Brisbane to Rockhampton, The Midlander arrived in Rockhampton at 4pm on 4 May 1954. The Midlander then commenced its maiden journey, departing from the Rockhampton railway station for Winton at 5:25pm. About 100 people watched from the platform as the train made its departure. Most of the available accommodation on the train was booked out for the first journey. Among the passengers on the train's first run to Winton were Minister for Transport Jack Duggan, Minister for Education George Devries and Member for Mackenzie Paddy Whyte.

The train arrived in Longreach at 1:15 pm the following day, before arriving in Winton several hours later. Large crowds gathered at both Longreach and Winton to welcome the train where brief ceremonies took place.

Through many years of its service, a diesel electric locomotive would pull the train to Emerald, before switching to two steam locomotives which would then pull the train through the Drummond Range. One of the steam locomotives would be taken off at Jericho, with the train continuing to Winton with just one steam locomotive.

== Incidents and accidents ==
Within a decade of its maiden journey, The Midlander's most infamous incident, the Medway Creek rail disaster occurred near Bogantungan during its return journey to Rockhampton on 26 February 1960 where seven people were killed when the flood-damaged bridge above Medway Creek collapsed, forcing the train to plunge into the water below.

== Replacement ==
In the late 1980s, tourism to western Queensland began to grow following attractions such as the Stockman's Hall of Fame opening at Longreach. To cater for this market, and recognizing the fact that travellers dislike changing trains, The Midlander was combined with the Brisbane–Rockhampton Capricornian Train renamed the Spirit of the Outback in November 1993 and the new service commenced at Brisbane and terminated at Longreach. A bus service now provides the connection to Winton.

== On board ==
The Midlander was made up of a mix of M series along with L series steel rolling stock. As at 1990, the service featured the following facilities and accommodation:

- First Class Roomette Sleepers
- First Class Twinette Sleepers
- Economy Class Triple Berth Sleepers
- Food Bar Car
- Sitting Cars

== See also ==
- Rail transport in Queensland
