= Bogantungan =

- Town
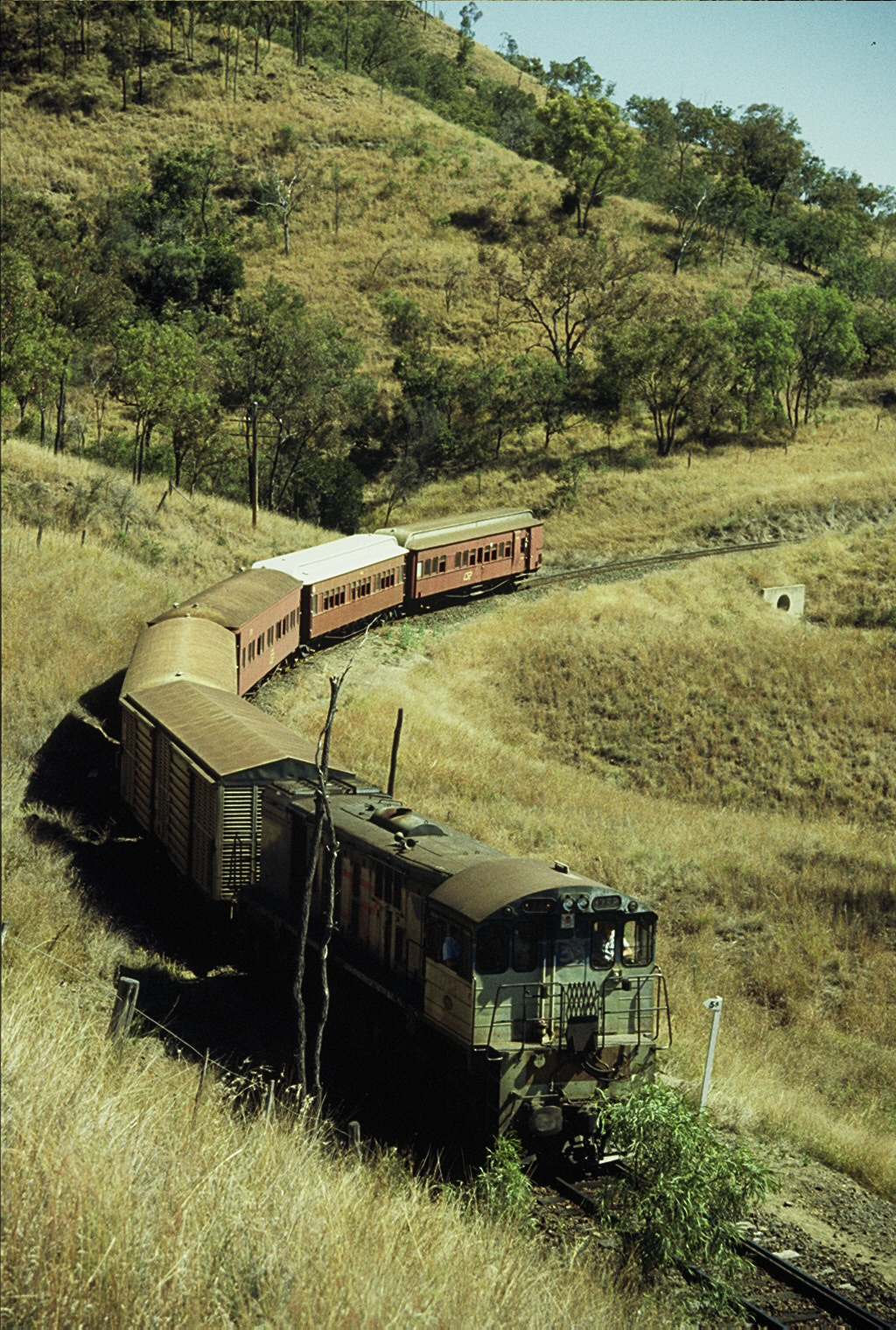
- Train on the Central Western line near Bogantungan, September 1989

- Coordinates: 23.6477°S 147.2919°E
- Country: Australia
- State: Queensland
- LGA: Central Highlands Region
- Location: 97 km (60 mi) W of Emerald; 367 km (228 mi) W of Rockhampton; 929 km (577 mi) NW of Brisbane

Government
  - State electorate: Gregory
  - Federal division: Flynn
- Time zone: UTC+10:00 (AEST)
- Postcode: 4702

Bogantungan is a rural town in the locality of Willows in the Central Highlands Region, Queensland, Australia.

== Geography ==
The town is 930 kilometres (580 mi) north west of the state capital Brisbane and 350 kilometres (220 mi) west of the regional city of Rockhampton.

The Central Western railway line passes through the town which was once served by the Bogantungan railway station. The small number of houses in the town are located around the railway station. The Capricorn Highway once passed through the town but now bypasses it to the north.

== History ==
The name Bogantungan derives from Aboriginal words "bogan" meaning "grass" and "tungan" meaning "tree".

The Central Western railway was built in sections, beginning at Rockhampton and then heading west. Each section involved establishing a temporary settlement to accommodate the workers while they were building the railway. After that section was complete, the workers moved further west were a new settlement was established. Although intended as temporary, some of these settlements continued to survive after the railway workers had moved on, becoming permanent towns. Bogantungan was one of these. In its heyday, it was a town of some thousands of people, with around 30 hotels.

In March 1881, the Queensland Government held a land sale, auctioning 48 town lots in the town of Bogantungan.

Bogantungan Post Office opened on 8 July 1881 and closed in 1982.

Bogantungan State School opened on 19 March 1883. It closed on 11 August 1972. It was on Jackson Street (23.6501°S 147.2875°E).

Nearby Medway station, in the Bogantungan ranges, was established by Robert Donaldson and C.E. Glissan. The Donaldson family, including Agnes Adelaide Donaldson moved there in 1909, and after the business partnership was dissolved the Donaldsons have continued to manage the property into the present day, as a cattle stud.

On 26 February 1960, Bogantungan was the site of the Medway Creek rail disaster, one of Queensland's worst train accidents. The Midlander passenger train, heading east to Rockhampton, passed over the flooded Medway Creek, just west of the town. The bridge collapsed when the train was partly over, with a number of carriages dropping into the water. A total of 4 passengers and 3 crew were killed, with 43 injured.

== Attractions ==
Boguntungan Railway Station is now a small historical museum and rest area, with a memorial and interpretive panels about the rail disaster and the railway buildings.

== Education ==
There are no schools in Bogantungan. The nearest government primary schools are in Lochington (48.5 kilometres (30.1 mi) south by minor roads), Anakie (55.5 kilometres (34.5 mi) east on the Capricorn Highway) or Alpha (71.5 kilometres (44.4 mi) west on the Capricorn Highway). The nearest government secondary school is in Alpha (to Year 10 only). The nearest government secondary school offering education to Year 12 is Emerald State High School in Emerald (98.3 kilometres (61.1 mi) east on the Capricorn Highway). Other secondary alternatives are distance education and boarding schools.
