= Corridor selection history for Australian high-speed rail =

Previous attempts to site infrastructure for 200+ km/h trains on the continent

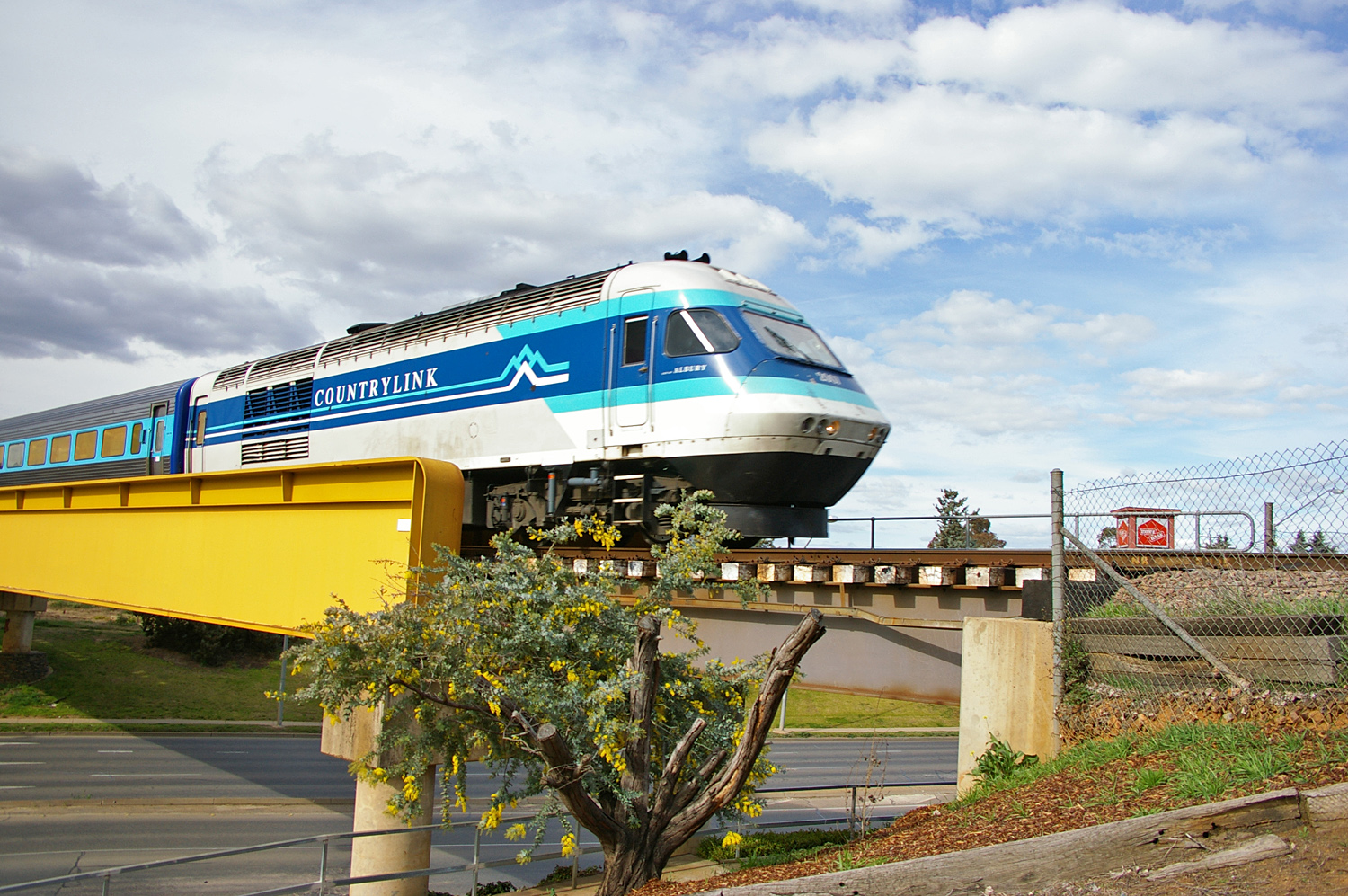
An XPT on the existing corridor in Wagga Wagga

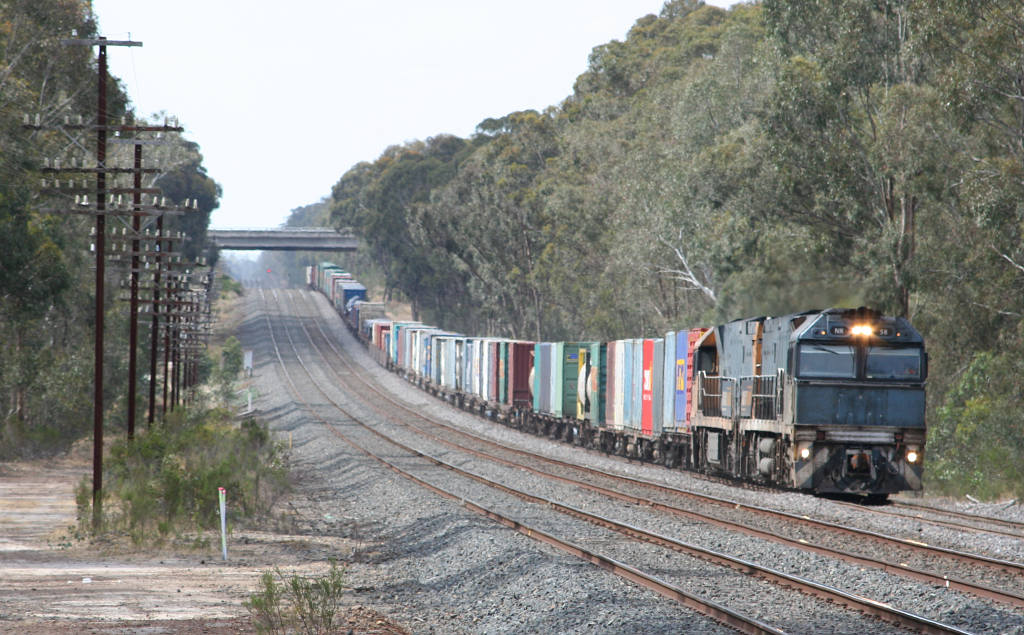
Rail corridor near Seymour

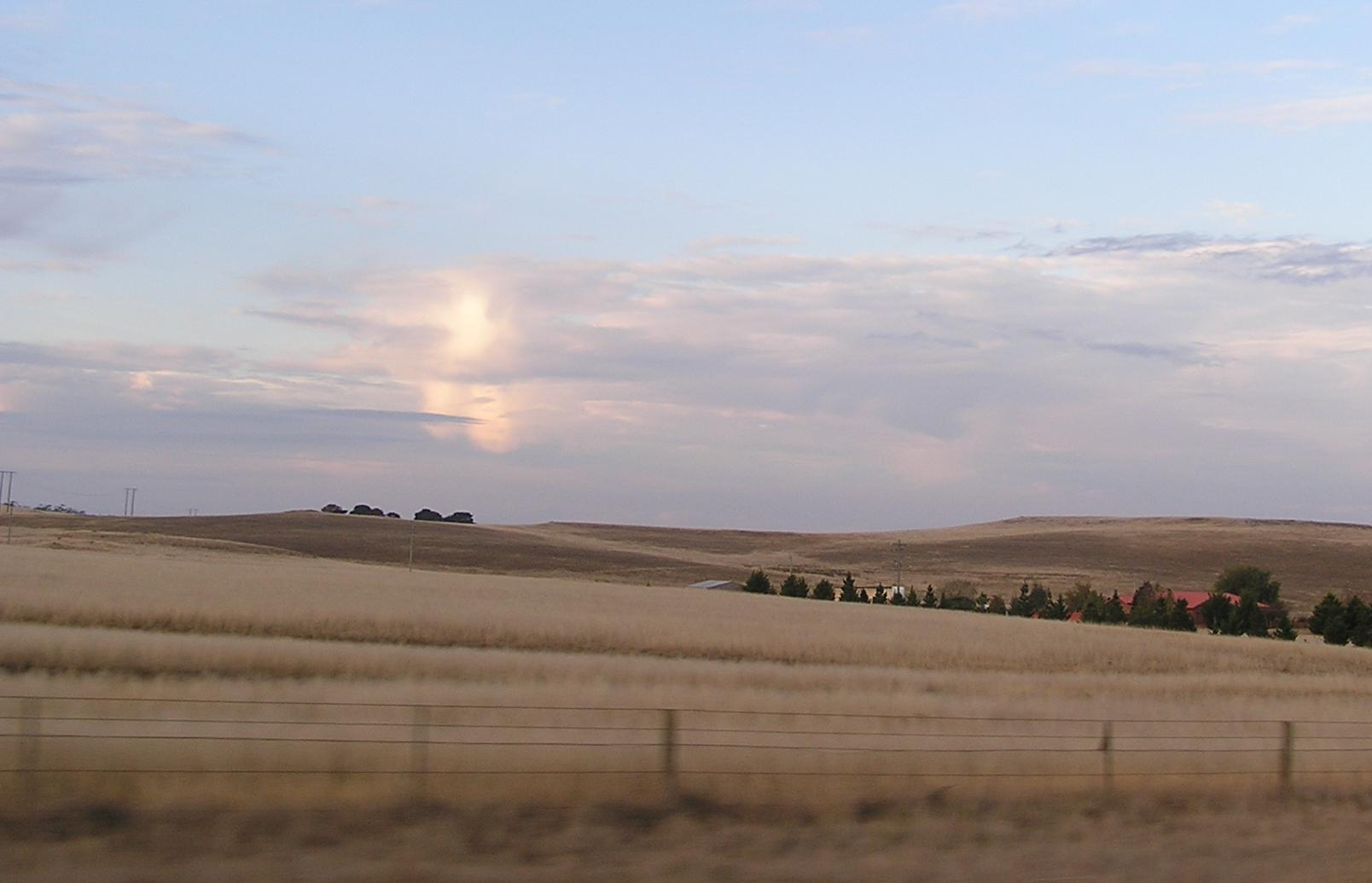
Monaro region

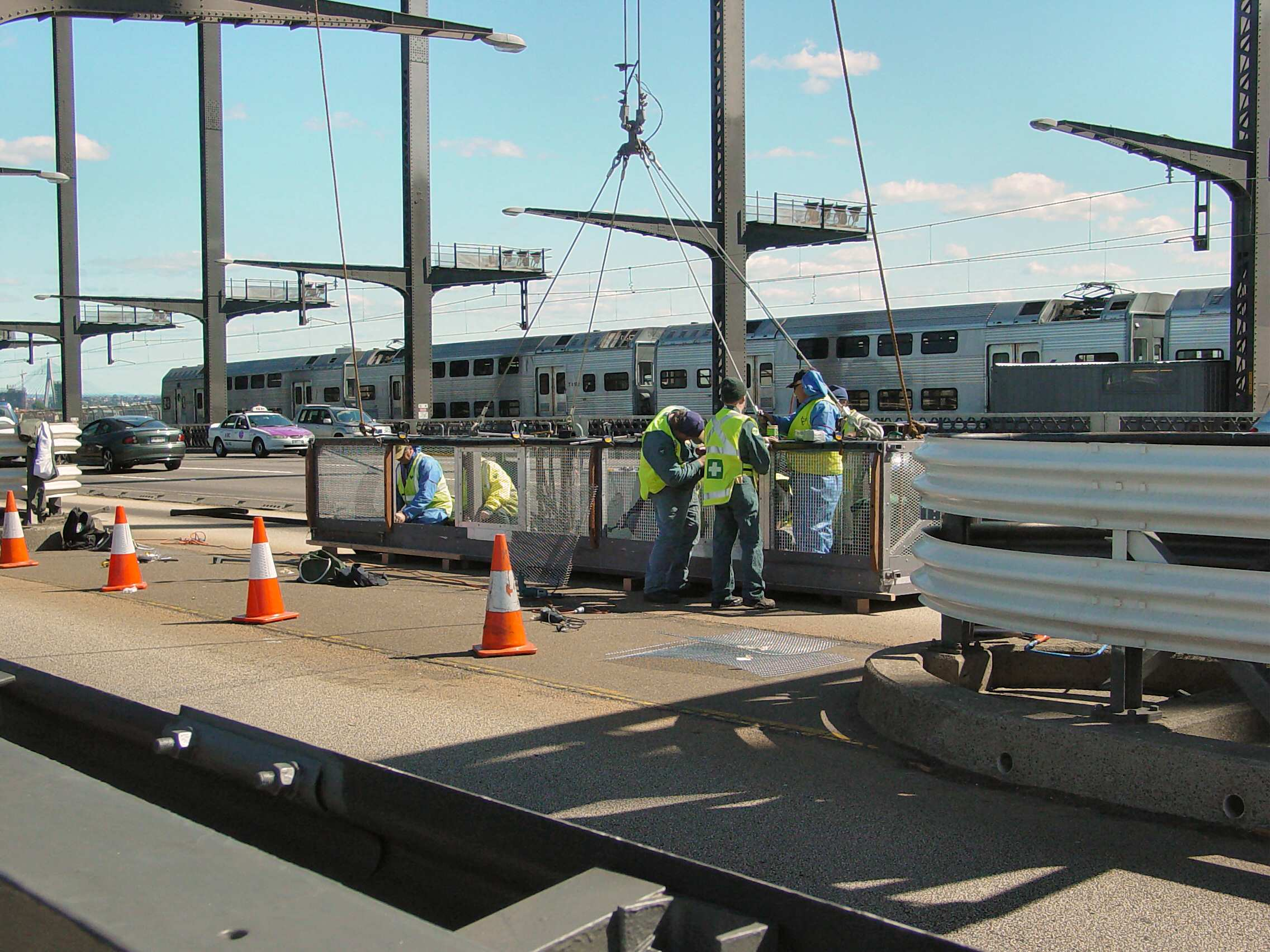
Sydney Harbour Bridge

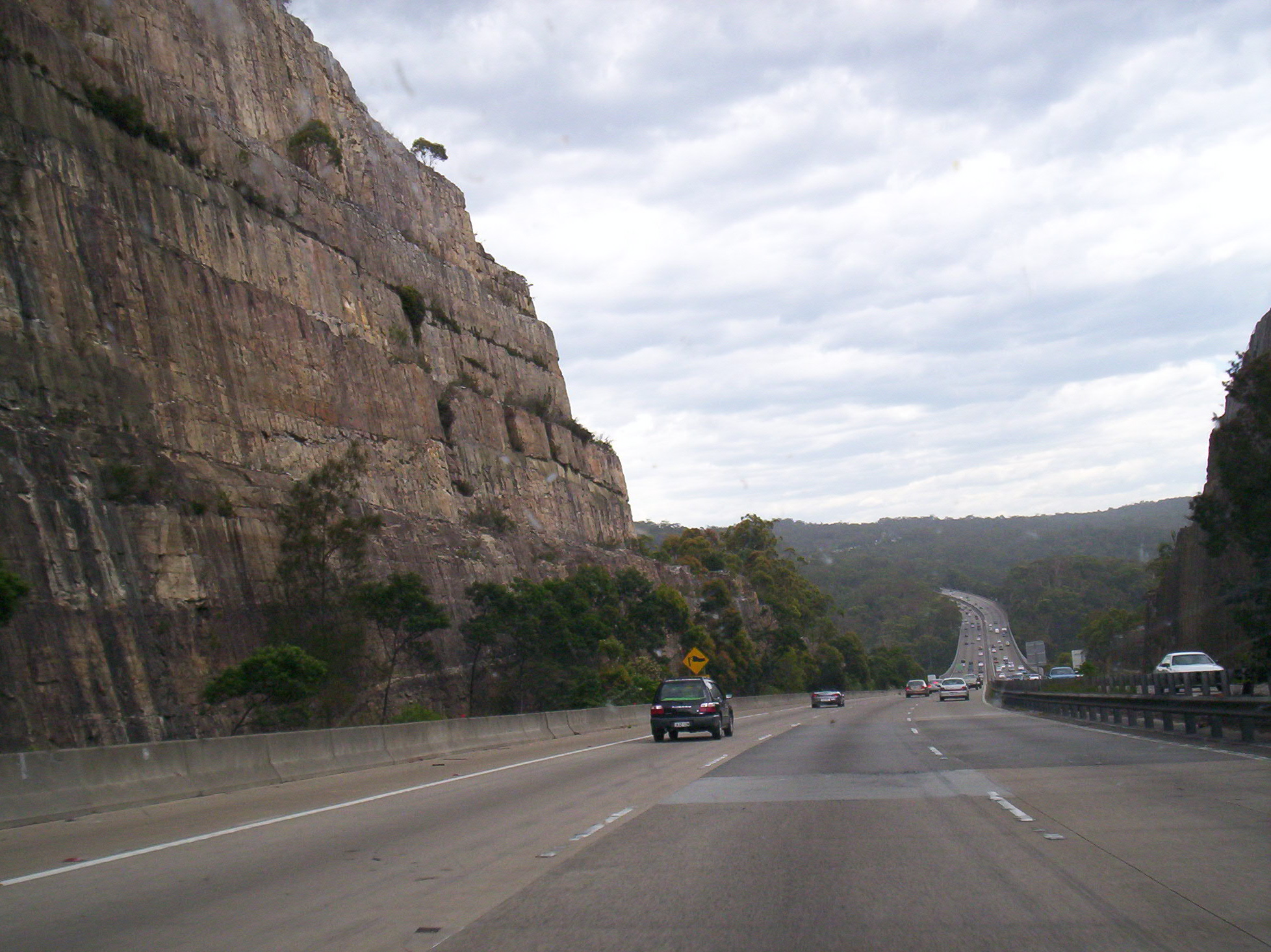
Pacific Motorway near Broken Bay

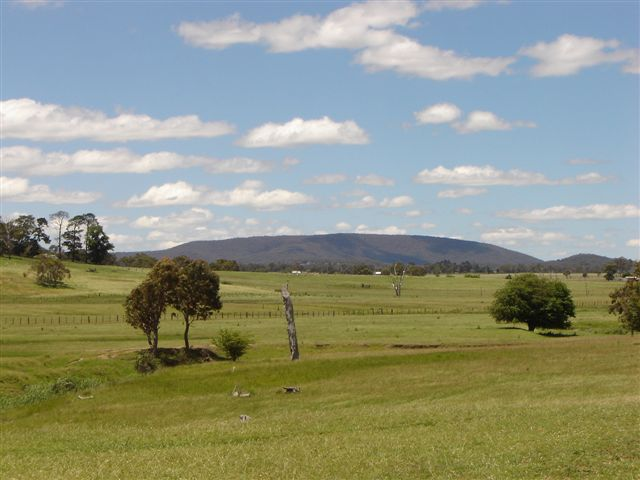
New England region

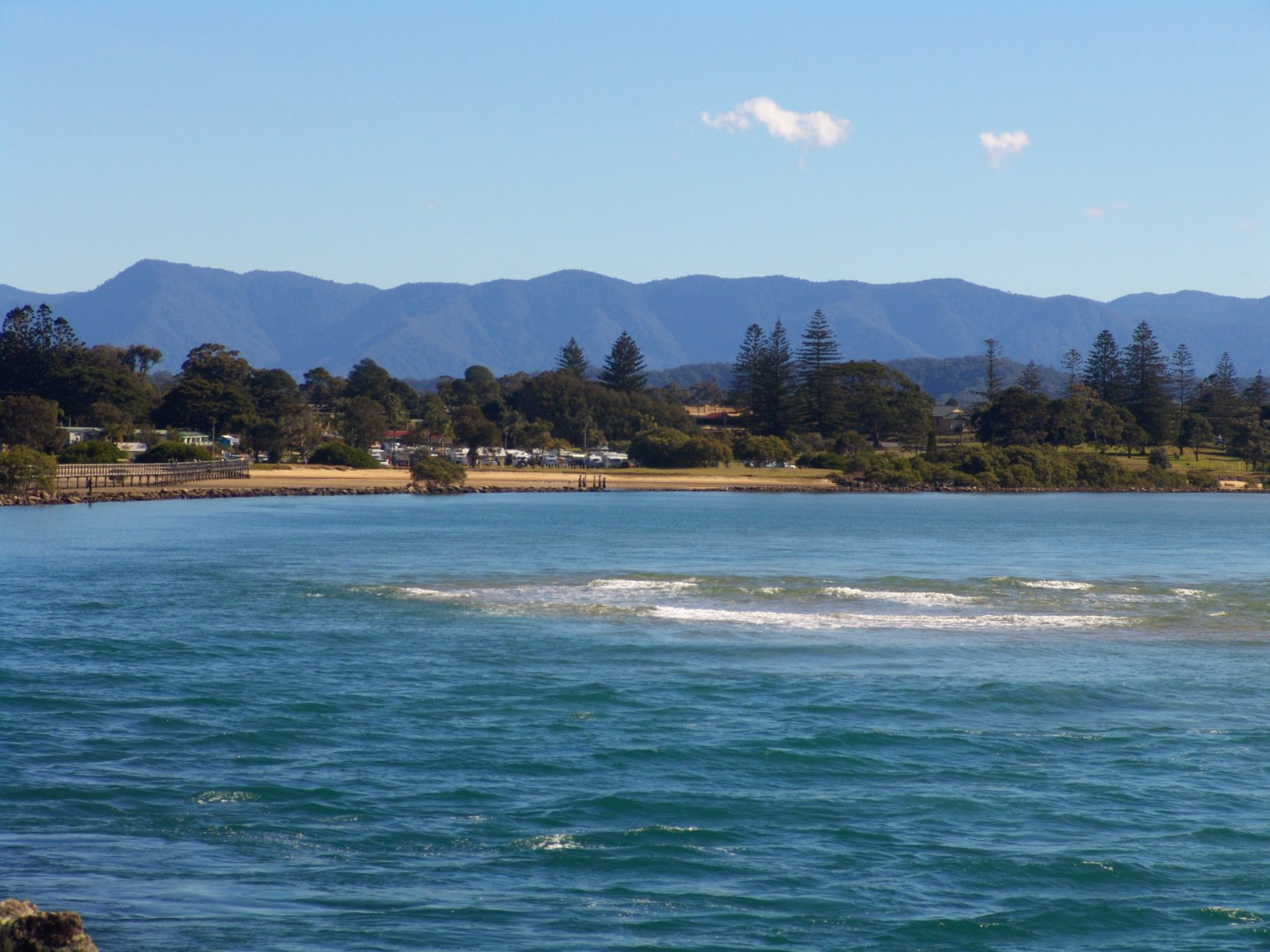
Mid North Coast region

A variety of routes for high-speed rail in Australia have been discussed since 1984, when CSIRO initiated the VFT project, but none has come to fruition. Although the term "high-speed rail" is in wide use, on only one occasion has a train in Australia achieved the internationally accepted lower limit of high-speed rail of 200 kilometres per hour (124 miles per hour). Australian passenger trains do not exceed a service speed of 160 km/h (99.4 mph), and then only sporadically. Much of the consideration of improved rail corridors has been directed at freight traffic, which is hampered in the eastern states by sharp curvature.

== Corridor selection ==
The routes studied include long inter-city routes (mainly along the east coast corridor) and shorter inner city routes, such as Sydney to Newcastle, Sydney to Penrith and Sydney to Macarthur.

=== East Coast corridor ===
The most frequently studied route for high-speed rail in Australia is between Melbourne, Canberra, Sydney and Brisbane. There are two broad corridor alignment options between each capital city on the route – a coastal and an inland corridor. Each has its own advantages and disadvantages from engineering, environmental, population and national development points of view.

- Melbourne—Canberra
  - Inland – Exiting Melbourne via the existing Broadmeadows corridor, the line would cross the Dividing Range at Seymour. It would then join the existing North East railway corridor through Benalla and Wangaratta, which would require only minimal straightening. Albury would be approached either from the west via the Murray River flats, or from the south via a new corridor through Beechworth. North of Albury, there are three options – one is to remain with the Hume Highway corridor through the increasingly dissected countryside through Gundagai and Yass before entering Canberra from the north. The other options are a more southerly route cutting through the Brindabella Ranges direct to Canberra (which would require extensive tunneling), or diverting north along the Main Southern railway to service the large regional centre of Wagga Wagga. Although this would be a longer route, the engineering costs would be lower due to the less mountainous terrain. After Wagga Wagga, the line would either continue on the Main Southern line to Cootamundra and Yass and enter Canberra from the north, or divert east through the Murrumbidgee River valley to a shorter tunnel beginning at Tumut and enter Canberra from the west. Due to the better regional development opportunities along the inland corridor, and perhaps fewer environmental issues, the Arup/TMG study identified this corridor as the preferred alignment.
  - Coastal – Exiting Melbourne via the broad-gauge Pakenham corridor, the line would traverse the generally flat Gippsland region, encompassing the towns of Traralgon, Sale, Bairnsdale and Orbost, before turning north into heavily dissected country. This climb from Gippsland to the Monaro region would necessitate numerous tunnels and viaducts, and possibly a prevailing grade of up to 3.5%. The line would generally follow the Monaro Highway to a summit of 1,070 m (3,510 ft) near Nimmitabel, and then continue on to Cooma and Queanbeyan. This alignment must necessarily pass through several National Parks and other regions of environmental significance, which could count against the selection of this corridor. Additionally, a station in central Canberra is difficult to achieve on this alignment; it would most likely have to be located at Canberra Airport or Queanbeyan.
- Canberra—Sydney
  - Inland – The railway would exit Canberra to the north or east on a new alignment, roughly following the Hume Highway corridor through Goulburn, Bowral and Campbelltown. Entry to metropolitan Sydney could be effected by utilising the existing East Hills and Airport lines via Sydney Airport.
  - Coastal – This corridor would be the same until Goulburn, where the line would turn east towards Wollongong. This alignment would present major engineering challenges due to having to cross the Illawarra escarpment twice, necessitating a 40 km (25 mi) tunnel on the southern approach, and several tunnels in the order of 10 km (6.2 mi) on the northern exit from Wollongong. The line could then utilise the undeveloped F6 Freeway corridor from Sutherland to Sydney Airport, from which it would use the subway system to reach Central station. Some have suggested an alignment to Nowra, thereafter continuing to Wollongong and Sydney, however the engineering and environmental considerations on such a route would be significant.
- Sydney—Brisbane
  - Newcastle leg – Due to the density of existing development and the formidable terrain, there is no easy way of exiting Sydney to the north. One option is to use the North Shore line to reach Hornsby, whereupon a new alignment would follow the existing Pacific Motorway corridor, cross Broken Bay via bridge or tunnel and enter Woy Woy and Gosford via a series of tunnels and viaducts. A second option is to tunnel from North Sydney directly to Woy Woy via a 40 km (25 mi) tunnel (making it one of the longest tunnels in the world). The alignment would then continue to Newcastle following the existing road and rail corridors. This route could use the Sydney Harbour Bridge if two of the existing highway lanes were returned to rail use. A 2024 business case created by the government-backed High Speed Rail Authority selected a variant of the second option for further development. After reaching Newcastle, the line would transit the Hunter Valley through Singleton and Muswellbrook before crossing the Great Dividing Range at Ardglen. After Tamworth, the line would have to climb to over 1,060 metres (3,480 ft) above sea level to reach the New England Tableland. After Armidale, it would climb even higher (peaking at 1,380 metres (4,530 ft) above sea level) before reaching Glen Innes, Tenterfield, Warwick and Toowoomba. The existing rail corridor on the Tableland would require extensive straightening and sections of new alignment. After Toowoomba, a favourable grade (albeit involving several 5–10 km tunnels) would take the railway through Ipswich and into Brisbane
  - Coastal – This route would follow the coast through Taree, Port Macquarie, Coffs Harbour, Grafton, Lismore and the Gold Coast before entering Brisbane via the Gold Coast line. Although there are no significant mountains to cross except the escarpment near the Queensland border, there are numerous major estuaries which will require long viaducts. This route is shorter than the inland option, presents less challenging engineering obstacles, and passes through regions of greater population density. For this reason the Arup-TMG study identified it as being slightly preferable to the inland route.

If we are serious about it, we better get down to identifying the corridor, identifying geotechnical issues with the proposal.

— Anthony Albanese, federal Minister for Infrastructure

=== Greater Melbourne ===
In late 2008, Transrapid re-entered the Australian high-speed rail debate with a proposal put forward to the Victoria State Government to build a privately funded and operated Maglev line to service the Greater Melbourne metropolitan area. It was presented as an alternative to the Cross-City Tunnel proposed in the Eddington Transport Report, which neglected to investigate above-ground transport options.

The proposed Maglev would connect the city of Geelong to metropolitan Melbourne's outer suburban growth corridors, Tullamarine and Avalon domestic and international terminals in under 20 minutes, continuing on to Frankston, in under 30 minutes. It would service a population of over 4 million, and Transrapid claimed a price of A$4 billion. However, the Victorian government dismissed the proposal in favour of the underground metropolitan network suggested by the Eddington Report.

=== Noosa-Gold Coast ===
The 2010 Infrastructure Partnerships Australia report identified Noosa-Brisbane-Gold Coast as a potentially viable high-speed rail link, and a possible precursor to a full east-coast system. The report predicted that a 350 km/h system would reduce travel times between Cooroy (22 km west of Noosa) and Brisbane to 31 minutes (currently 2:08 hours), capturing as much as 84% of the total commuter market. Travel time between Brisbane and the Gold Coast would be reduced to 21 minutes, capturing up to 27% of commuters.

=== Perth-Bunbury ===
In January 2010, Western Australia's Public Transport Authority completed a feasibility study into a high-speed rail link between Perth and Bunbury. The proposed route would follow the existing narrow gauge Mandurah line to Anketell, and then follow the Kwinana Freeway and Forrest Highway to Lake Clifton, including 140 km of new track. It would replace the existing Australind passenger service, which is under increasing use for freight traffic.

The proposed service would have a maximum speed of 160 km/h, at which the travel time from Perth Underground to a new station in central Bunbury would be 91 minutes. However, the notional corridor allows for future upgrade to 200 km/h.
