= Consolidated Land and Rail Australia =

Consolidated Land and Rail Australia (trading as CLARA) is a property development consortium proposing a high speed rail network for the Australian east coast that would funded by the development of new smart cities along the route. The company began operations in 2015, and in 2018 was one of three proposals invited to develop a detailed business case with federal government funding. The proposal attracted significant media attention for what was perceived as a radically different approach from previous attempts at introducing high-speed rail in Australia.

== History ==
Following the release of the Phase 2 report in late 2015, businessman Nick Cleary began taking options on land along the proposed route of the high-speed rail line. However, he found that the land was already mostly subdivided and therefore prohibitively complex and expensive to acquire. As such, Cleary shifted his focus to greenfields land outside the major existing regional centres. He did not inform landowners the details of his intentions, instead telling them that he represented a "major infrastructure project".

The domain name clara.com.au was registered by investment banker Geoff Moore in October 2015, and the website was activated with only "coming soon" placeholders. In March 2016, a scheduled appointment between CLARA and the office of Prime Minister Malcolm Turnbull was reported by media outlets, along with rumours that the meeting would discuss a proposal for a high speed railway line between Melbourne, Sydney and Brisbane. The Age reported that the company was based in Melbourne, and was apparently unrelated to any other major Australian companies, although it appeared to be backed by an American infrastructure investor. Federal MP John Alexander emerged as a supporter of the plan, explaining that it was based on a "value capture" funding model including the purchase of regional land along the route.

The CLARA plan was officially launched in Melbourne on 13 July, with chairman Nick Cleary announcing that deals had been finalised for the purchase of land on which to situate 8 new railway stations and greenfield property developments, following 12 months of negotiations. The announcement followed discussions with officials from the Victorian and NSW governments conducted throughout April. At the event, former Premier of New South Wales Barry O'Farrell and former Premier of Victoria Steve Bracks spoke in favour of the proposal, revealing that the project was backed by former American infrastructure planners. By the end of 2016, however, a managing director of CLARA had resigned, and O'Farrell and Bracks had resigned from the advisory committee.

The announcement of the proposal also revealed that the preferred transport option was a maglev system, able to reach Shepparton from Melbourne in 30 minutes, and Sydney in under two hours. However, financial details of the plan were not released, with the company's directors describing the complete funding model as commercial-in-confidence.

In October, Cleary presented a speech to the Australian Property Council, stating that construction on the rail line could begin by 2021. Later that month, the CLARA proposal was presented to a federal parliamentary committee (chaired by John Alexander) alongside a competing Hyperloop One proposal, which differed substantially from the CLARA model by gearing its service towards existing regional centres. Cleary suggested that the CLARA model could be constructed using Hyperloop technology, but a Hyperloop spokesperson rejected the suggestion, stating that the plans were not compatible. At the same time, Cleary publicly announced that the ACT government had not entered into discussions regarding a spur line to Canberra.

The parliamentary committee handed down its findings in February 2017, recommending that the government actively seek privately-funded proposals for a Melbourne-Sydney high speed rail link. Meanwhile, shadow infrastructure minister Anthony Albanese introduced a private member's bill to the parliament, calling for a dedicated High Speed Rail Planning Authority to be established by the federal government.

During the second half of 2017, CLARA met with councils along the route, encouraging them to support the project for the benefits it would bring to local government areas. Geoff Kettle, a former mayor of Goulburn Mulwaree Council in New South Wales, led the consultation process, stating that although CLARA had acquired rights to around 50% of the total land required, the remaining portion would become increasingly expensive to obtain because of development. Five councils ultimately provided written support to the CLARA proposal following the process.

At the end of October, CLARA announced it had assembled a consortium of 13 companies to lead planning and construction of the project, including Hitachi, Cardno, the federal government's CSIRO, DLA Piper and other smaller design and construction companies, as well as PwC to oversee the financial modelling for the plan. At the same time, its plan was placed under consideration for a $20 million federal government grant to facilitate the development of a business case, while competing proposals from other companies and Transport for NSW were announced.

The federal government announced that the CLARA proposal had been granted public funding to continue developing its business case on 9 March 2018, along with two other proposals in different states. One competing proposal, from the NSW government, is for a line between Sydney and Newcastle, while the second, from a Queensland-based consortium, proposes a line from Brisbane to the Sunshine Coast.

The business case was completed in 2019 but never released.

== Funding model ==
Value capture is a model of investment which relies on recouping some of the increase in value of an asset over time. In the case of CLARA, the primary source of this income is the increased land value in areas surrounding the stations along the high speed rail line.

This funding model has been compared to the development of railroads in the United States, where private companies constructed railroads on land purchased from governments, and recouped the investment from the construction of towns needed to service and operate the line.

== Proposed rail network ==
The route identified by CLARA extends from Melbourne to Sydney via Shepparton and Canberra. The consortium has proposed that sections from Melbourne to Shepparton and Sydney to Canberra be constructed first to prove the route's viability.

Although no specific rail technology has been identified by CLARA, it indicated to stakeholders that any tracks would be elevated, minimising the impact on landowners. In addition, the consortium claimed that its specific planned route was largely similar to the corridor identified by Infrastructure Australia.

== Analysis and criticism ==
Expert opinion on the CLARA plan on its initial launch was largely critical of its funding model, and focused on the ability of the rail line to compete with the established and extensive air travel market, especially that between Melbourne and Sydney. Engineering groups noted that the complexities of developing a high-speed rail route from scratch and the enormous capital expenditure required for construction had deterred previous proposals and were not addressed by the CLARA plan.

Paddy Manning, writing in The Monthly, observed that while the details of the plan were scant, and the likelihood of its success generating new regional cities were minimal, the activities of CLARA had found support in regional Australia because they offered hope for failing regional economies. However, he also noted that CLARA was one of many proposals for high-speed rail links along the eastern seaboard both past and present, and faced enormous challenges working with governments to even commence construction.

Similarly, a report by Foreground, the publishing arm of the Australian Institute of Landscape Architects, concluded that the radical CLARA plan was unlikely to find support from government because of the political issues inherent in prioritising the development of new regional centres over existing towns and cities. The report further noted that obtaining a reliable water supply for new population centres in inland Australia would be a major difficulty.
