= High-speed rail in Australia =

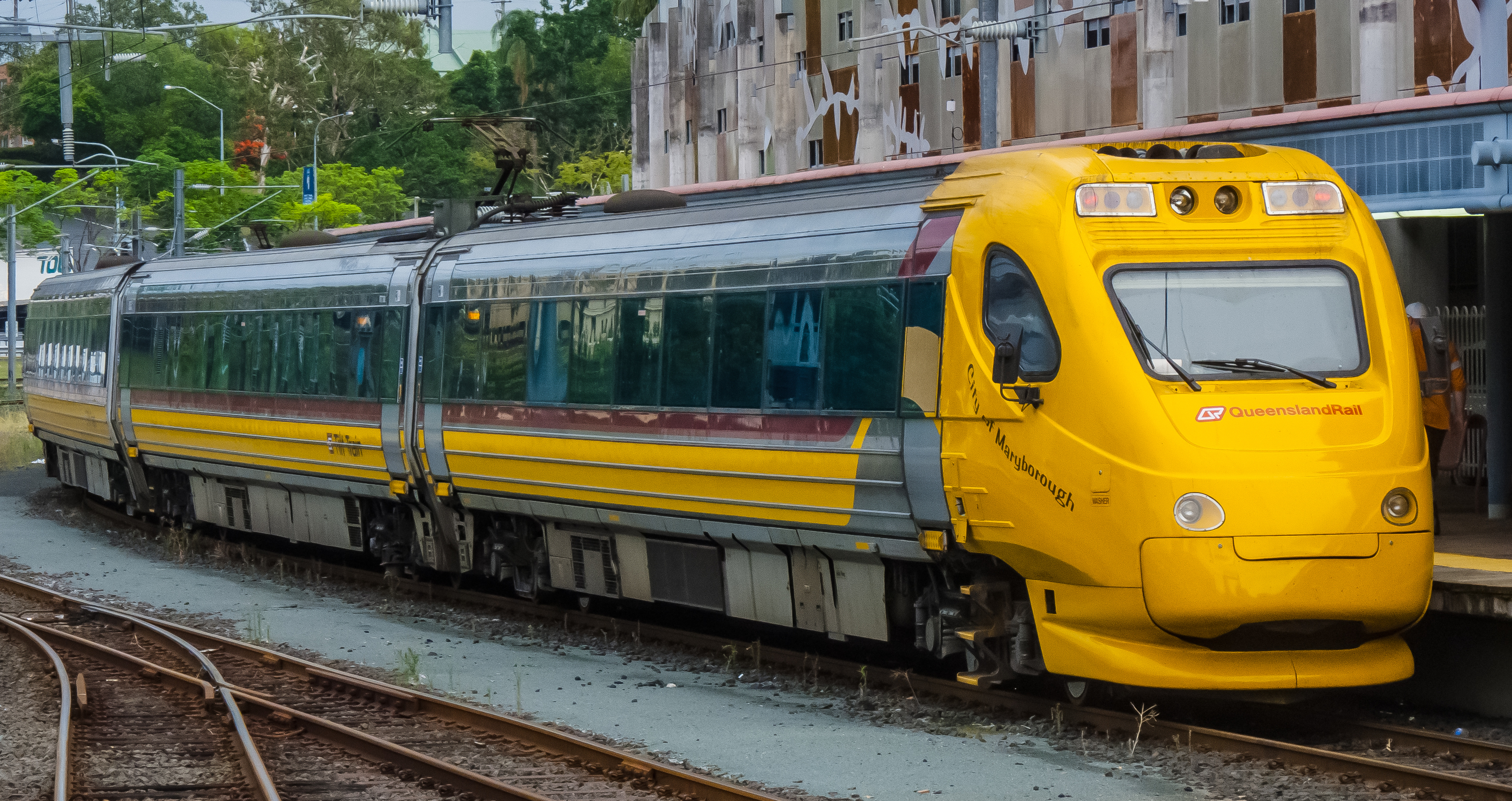
- The Electric Tilt Train holds the Australian rail speed record

Overview
- Status: Proposed
- Website: www.hsra.gov.au

Service
- Type: High-speed rail
- Services: Proposals linking Sydney, Melbourne, Canberra, Newcastle, Brisbane and elsewhere

High-speed rail in Australia has been under investigation since the early 1980s. Every federal government since this time has investigated the feasibility of constructing high-speed rail with speeds above 200 km/h, but to date nothing has ever gone beyond the detailed planning stage. Various corridors have been proposed for a potential high-speed line. The most commonly suggested route is between Australia's three largest cities, Brisbane to Sydney to Melbourne, which, as of 2025, is the world's fifth-busiest air corridor. The federal government's latest proposal as of February 2026 is a link between Sydney and Newcastle to be completed first by 2039, with the extensions to Brisbane and Melbourne to come at a later date.

Since the introduction of the New South Wales XPT, some Australian trains have been capable of high-speed operation. The Australian rail speed record of 210 km/h (130 mph) was set by Queensland Rail's Electric Tilt Train during a trial run in 1998; the internationally accepted threshold for high-speed rail is 200 km/h (124 mph). Trains in New South Wales, Victoria, Queensland and Western Australia operate at a maximum service speed of 160 km/h (100 mph).

The High Speed Rail Authority, a federal government agency established in 2023, has been tasked with "advising on, planning, developing and overseeing the construction and operation of a transformational network along Australia's eastern seaboard". The authority's first priority is planning and corridor works for the Sydney to Newcastle section of a high-speed rail network, backed by a $500 million commitment from the Australian Government.

== Overview ==
The construction of a high-speed rail link along the east coast has been the target of several investigations since the early 1980s. Air travel dominates the inter-capital travel market, and intra-rural travel is almost exclusively car-based. Rail has a significant presence in the rural / city fringe commuter market, but inter-capital rail currently has very low market share due to low speeds and infrequent service. However, travel times between the capitals by high-speed rail could be as fast as or faster than air travel, as the 2013 High Speed Rail Study Phase 2 Report estimated that conventional high-speed rail express journeys from Sydney to Melbourne would take 2 hours and 44 minutes, while those from Sydney to Brisbane would take 2 hours and 37 minutes.

Various studies and recommendations have asserted that a high-speed rail service between the major eastern capital cities could be viable as an alternative to air. Although such studies have generated much interest from the private sector and captured the imagination of the general public upon their release, to date no private-sector proposal has been able to demonstrate financial viability without the need for significant government assistance.

A mature high-speed rail system would be more economically competitive, provide mass transit, have a duration of travel that would compare with or be quicker than air travel, and would reduce national carbon dioxide emissions.

In 2012, over 12 million people lived along the Sydney–Melbourne rail corridor.

=== Present status ===
The maximum service speed on Australian railways is 160 km/h (99 mph). Some trains in Australia are capable of high-speed operation, but are limited by track conditions. Regional and inter-city rail is extensive on the Australian mainland, with networks serving New South Wales, Victoria, Queensland and Western Australia.

==== New South Wales ====
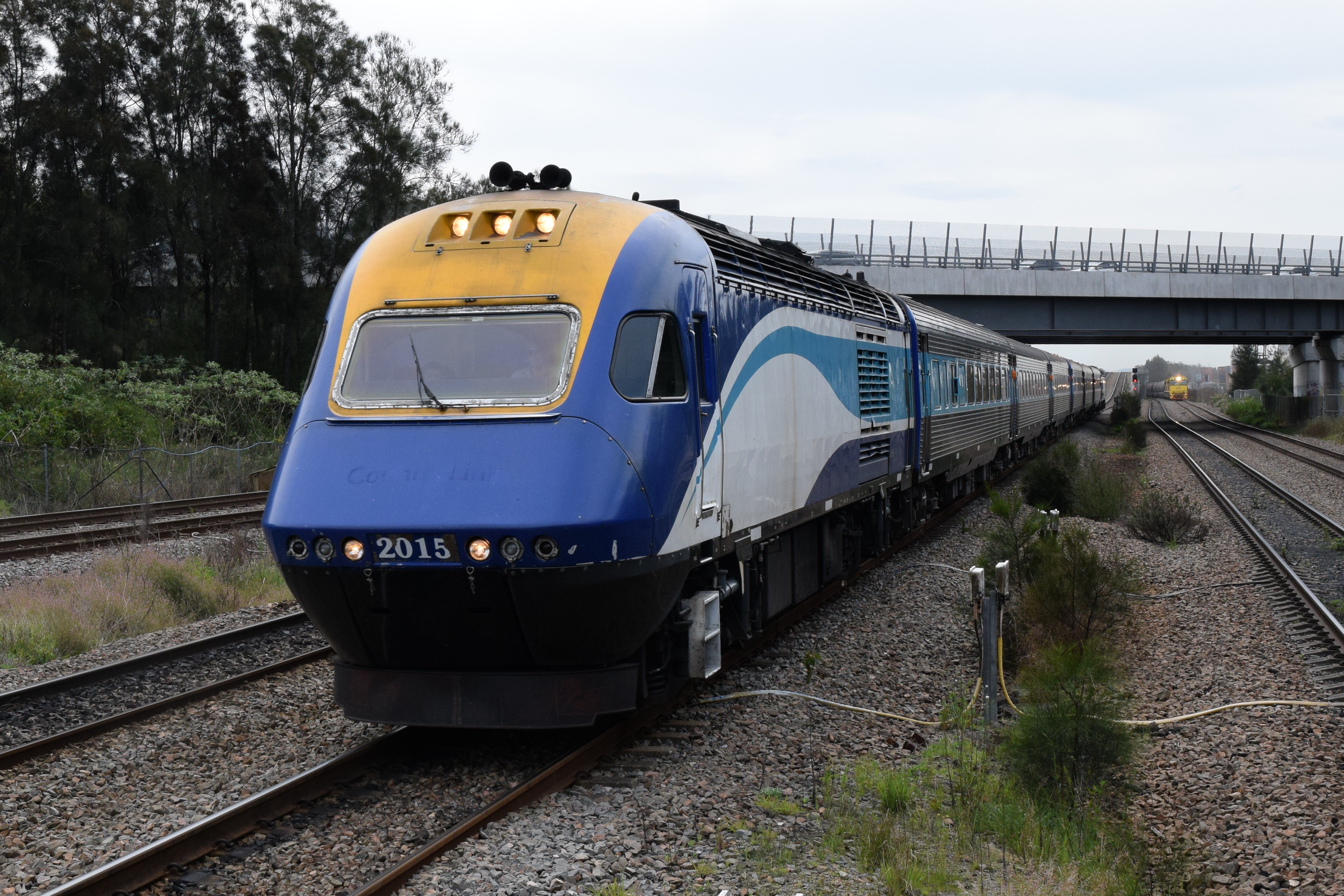
The NSW TrainLink XPT fleet runs from Sydney to regional and interstate destinations

The XPT (Express Passenger Train) entered service in New South Wales in 1982. It set an Australian speed record for the time of 193 km/h (120 mph) on a test run in 1992, beating its own previous record. The train is not often used to its full potential, operating along winding steam-era alignments, and at times has had its top speed limited due to track condition and level crossing incidents. Nonetheless, it significantly reduced travel times, cutting up to two hours off the trip from Sydney to Melbourne. The XPT operates at a top speed of 160 km/h (100 mph). However, it can theoretically reach speeds of 200 km/h. Safety-related issues, signal deficiencies & the retrofitting of train-stop mechanisms to power cars in 2006 resulted in XPT speeds being limited to 115 km/h on Sydney's electrified network.

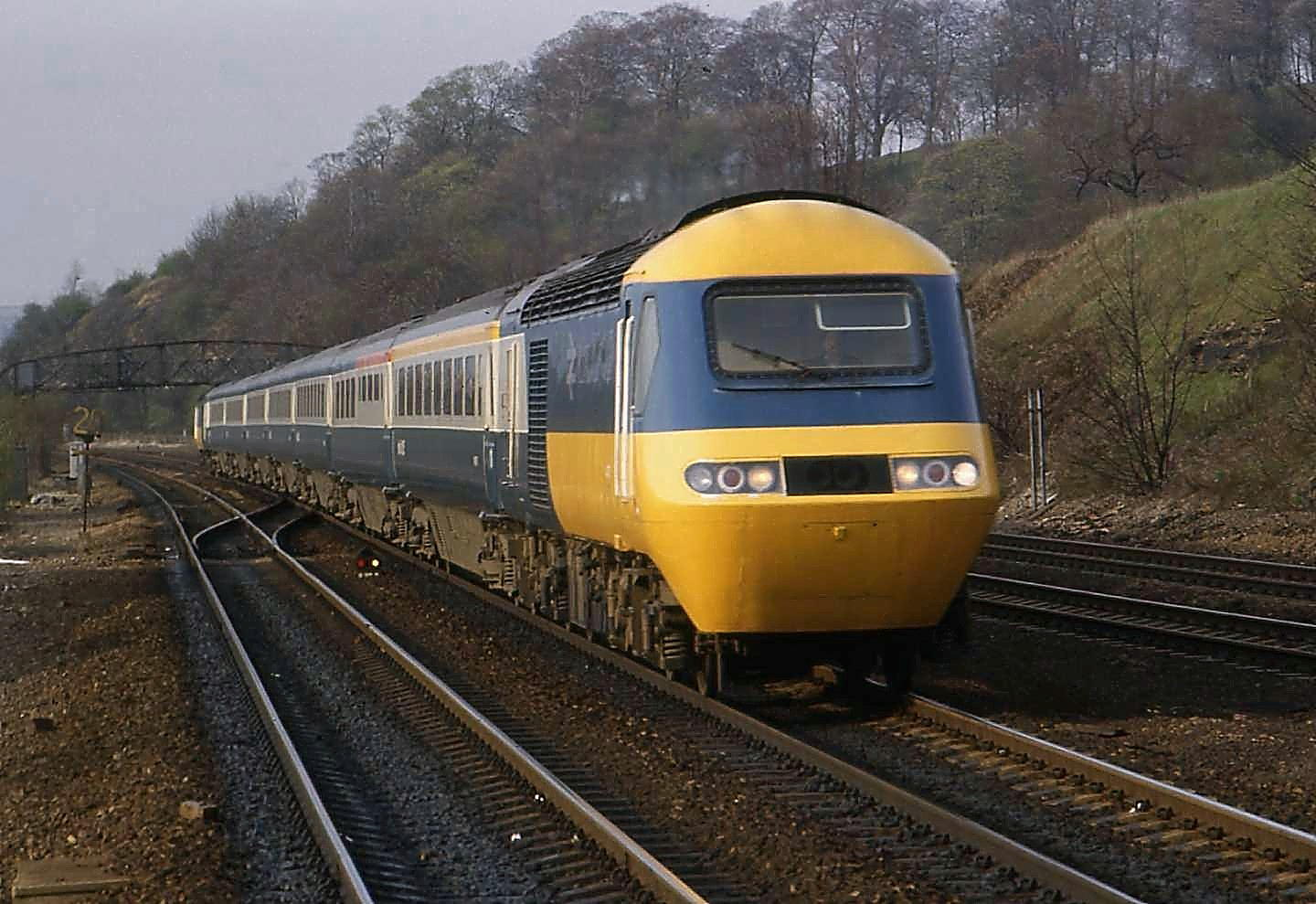
The XPT design is based on that of the InterCity 125

In January 1978, the Public Transport Commission invited tenders for a fleet of high-speed railcars similar to the Prospector railcars delivered by Comeng to the Western Australian Government Railways in 1971. Comeng submitted a tender for a train based on the British Rail designed InterCity 125 which had entered service with British Rail in October 1976. In August 1979, Comeng was announced as the successful bidder. The design was significantly modified for Australian conditions. The passenger trailer cars were based on a Budd design, with the British Rail Mark 3 trailers considered unsuitable. Nonetheless, the passenger car bogies were based on the British Rail BT10 type.

NSW TrainLink currently operates XPT trains from Sydney to Melbourne, Brisbane, Dubbo, Grafton and Casino.

The D sets were the second class of train produced for New South Wales to be able to operate at 160 km/h (100 mph). However, their service speed was restricted to 130 km/h (80 mph).

==== Queensland ====
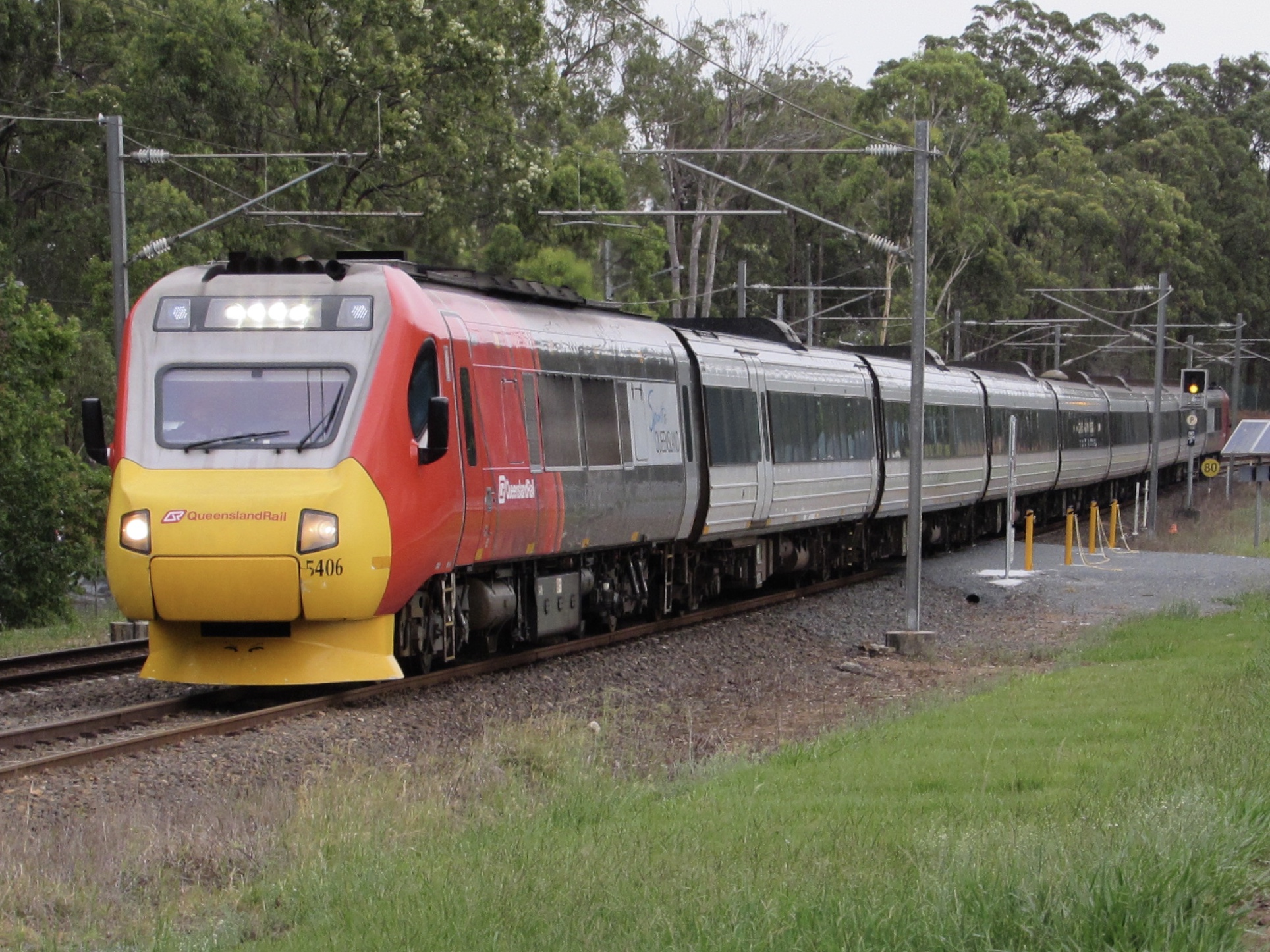
Diesel Tilt Train

The Electric Tilt Train entered service in Queensland on 6 November 1998, operating the Spirit of Capricorn between Brisbane and Rockhampton. With a journey time of seven hours, they shaved over two hours from the schedule operated by the preceding InterCity Express sets. Using traction equipment derived from the JR Shikoku 8000 series trains, one reached 210 km/h (130 mph) north of Bundaberg in May 1999, an Australian speed record that still stands and which makes it the fastest narrow-gauge train in the world.

In August 1999, a contract was awarded to Walkers for two diesel tilting trains to operate services from Brisbane to Cairns. In contrast to the Electric Tilt Train, the Diesel Tilt Train is a push-pull locomotive based train. In October 2010 Downer Rail was awarded a contract to build a further diesel tilt train with two power cars and 12 carriages to replace locomotive hauled stock on The Sunlander. The third set entered service in 2014.

The maximum speed of the Tilt Trains in service is 160 km/h (99 mph).

==== Victoria ====
V/Line operates regional services in Victoria. In the late 2010s and early 2020s, the Victorian regional network underwent one of the largest periods of expansion and upgrade in its history, resulting in widespread improvements. V/Line's VLocity trains run at speeds of 160 km/h (99 mph).

==== Western Australia ====
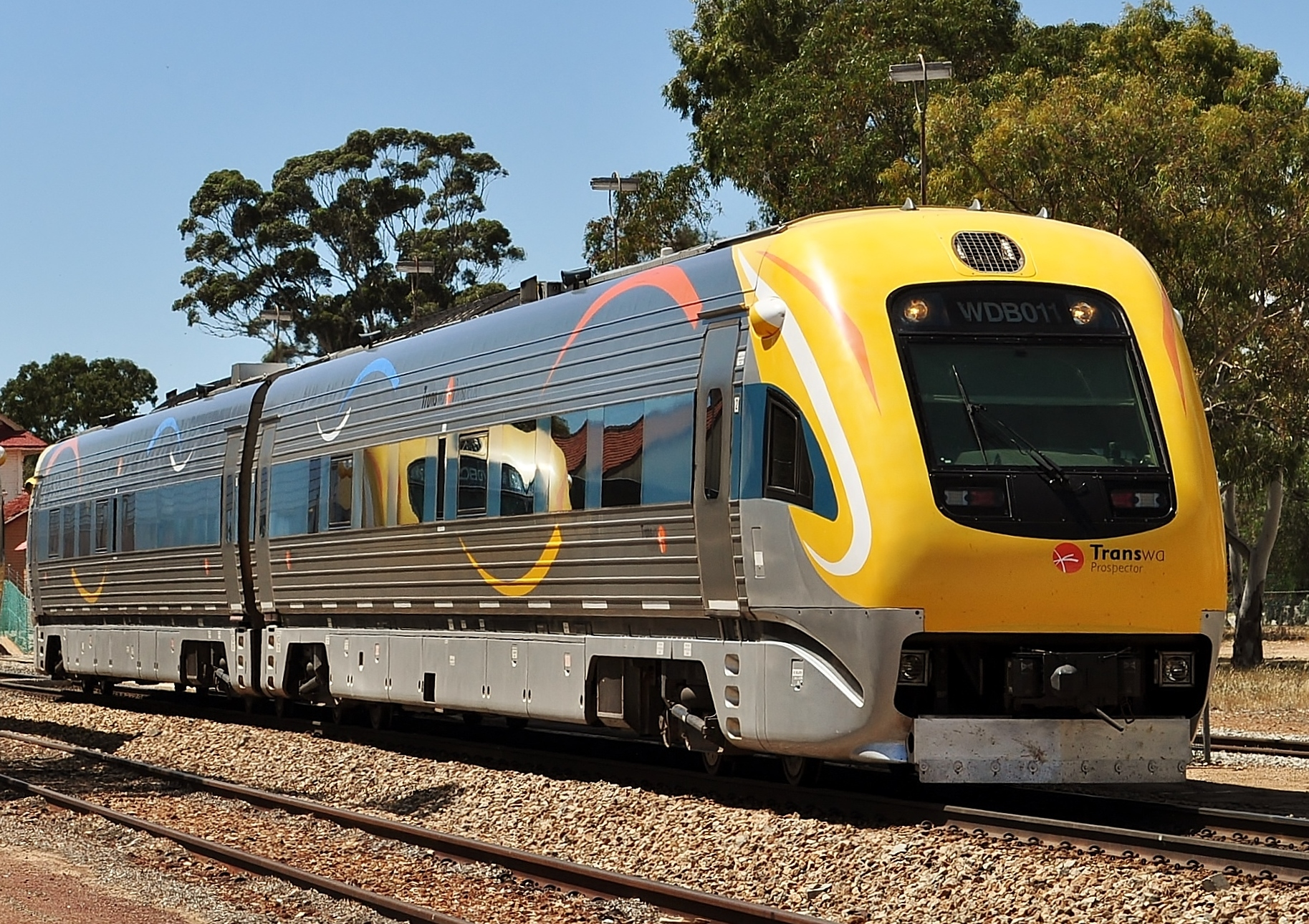
A Transwa WDA/WDB/WDC class railcar

In December 2000 Westrail awarded a contract to United Goninan, Broadmeadow for nine railcars to replace the 1971 built WAGR WCA/WCE class fleet. Seven were for Prospector and two for the AvonLink service. The first entered service on 28 June 2004. The new railcars are capable of 200 km/h (120 mph), but track conditions restrict their top speed to 160 km/h (99 mph).

== Proposals ==
Various proposals have sought to introduce high-speed service in Australia through varyingly ambitious projects ranging from improving existing lines to constructing entirely new ones.

=== 1970s–1980s ===
The rail network has long been a target of proposals for improvement. The 1979 Premiers' Meeting proposed the electrification of the Sydney–Melbourne line to improve transit time from over 12 hours to under 10, but a senate committee found this was not justified on economic grounds. In 1981, the Institution of Engineers proposed the Bicentennial High-Speed Railway Project, which proposed to link the five capitals of south-eastern Australia (Adelaide, Melbourne, Canberra, Sydney and Brisbane) in time for the Australian Bicentenary. However, it proposed only the strengthening and partial electrification of the existing tracks, new deviations to bypass the worst sections, additional passing loops, and the purchase of new diesel-electric trains. It would offer only mild improvements on the existing travel times: Sydney to Canberra in three hours, and Sydney to Melbourne in nine; it cannot therefore be considered a true high-speed rail proposal.

=== 1980s ===
==== 1984 CSIRO proposal ====
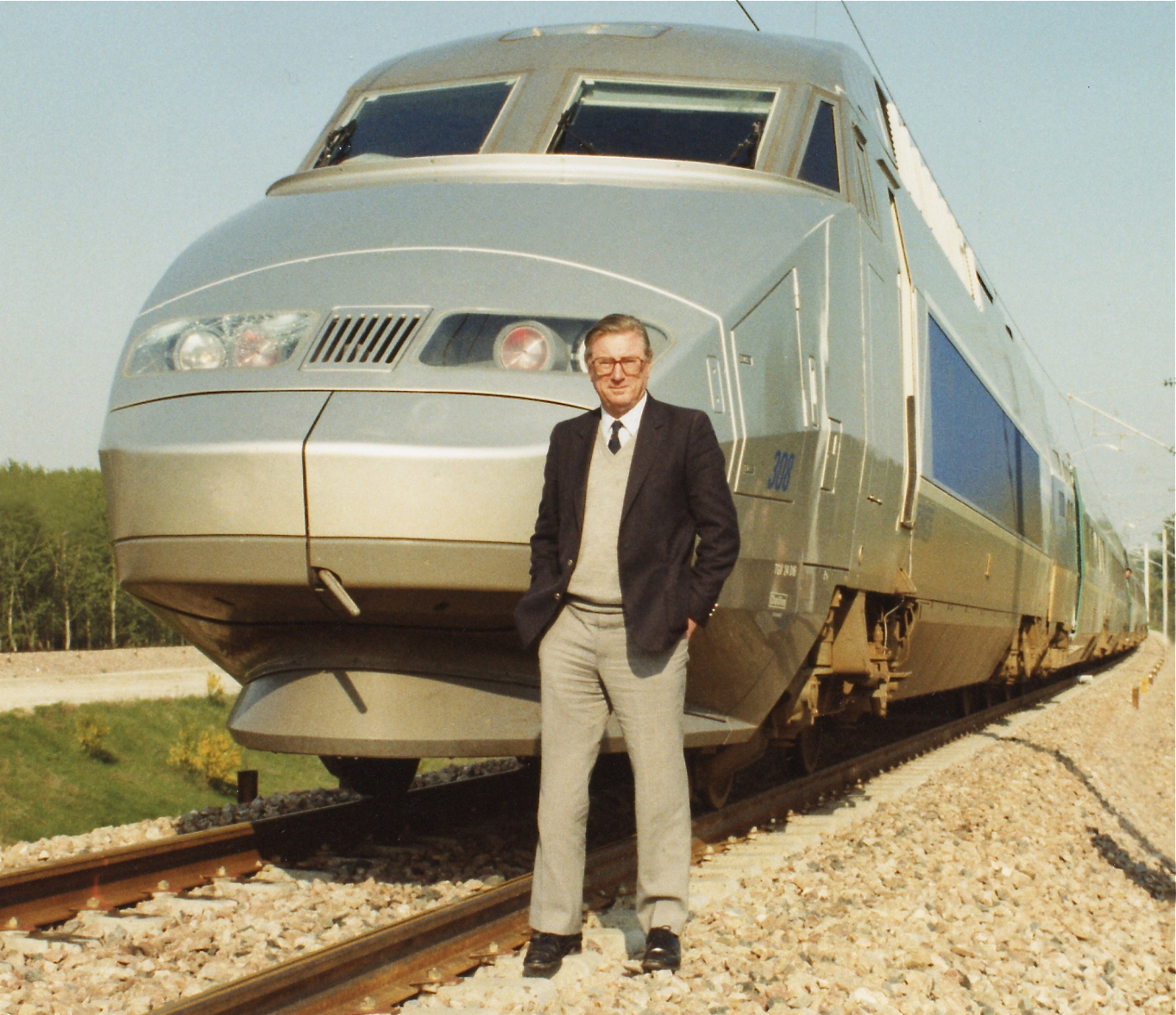
Paul Wild on track in front of a TGV, France, 1989

The first true high-speed rail proposal was presented to the Hawke government in June 1984 by the CSIRO, spearheaded by its chairman, Dr Paul Wild. The proposal was to link Melbourne, Canberra and Sydney via a coastal corridor, based on French TGV technology. The proposal estimated construction costs at A$2.5 billion ($9.15 billion in 2023), with initial revenue of A$150 million per annum exceeding operating costs of A$50 million per annum. The proposal attracted much public and media attention, as well as some private sector capital for feasibility studies.

In September 1984, the Bureau of Transport Economics found that the probable construction costs had been underestimated by A$1.5 billion, and the proposal would therefore be uneconomic. The Minister for Transport, Peter Morris, rejected the proposal.

==== Very Fast Train joint venture ====
Later in 1984 Peter Abeles, chairman of TNT, expressed interest in Dr Wild's proposal.

Two years later in September 1986, the Very Fast Train Joint Venture was established, comprising Elders IXL, Kumagai Gumi, TNT and later BHP, with Dr Wild as chairman. They proposed a 350 km/h rail link from Sydney to Canberra via Goulburn, and then on to Melbourne via the coastal route (or alternatively the inland route). A feasibility study estimated to cost A$19 million ($51.3 million in 2023) was initiated by the group in 1988. In 1989, after talks with the Queensland Government, the joint venture group also performed a preliminary analysis of a coastal link to Brisbane. In 1990 the joint venture released the results of the major feasibility study, simply titled VFT – Project Evaluation. It proposed an inland route between Melbourne, Sydney and Canberra, with intermediate stations at Campbelltown, Bowral, Goulburn, Yass, Wagga Wagga, Albury-Wodonga, Benalla, Seymour and Melbourne Airport. It was estimated to cost $6.6 billion ($16.6 billion in 2023) and take five years to construct, beginning in 1992.

The VFT was opposed by numerous groups, notably the Australian Conservation Foundation and the Australian Democrats. Concerns centred around the environmental impact a coastal corridor would have on fragile ecosystems, noise pollution and the amount of public money that might be required.

After the release of the project evaluation, negotiations continued between the joint venture and state and federal governments. A favourable tax regime was sought, without which it was claimed that the project would not be economically viable. Premier of South Australia John Bannon was among the vocal proponents of tax breaks for major infrastructure projects such as the VFT. In August 1991, the Hawke Cabinet rejected the proposed tax breaks after it was claimed they would have cost A$1.4 billion (A$3.2 billion in 2023). Subsequently the VFT Joint Venture folded.

=== 1990s ===
==== Tilting trains ====
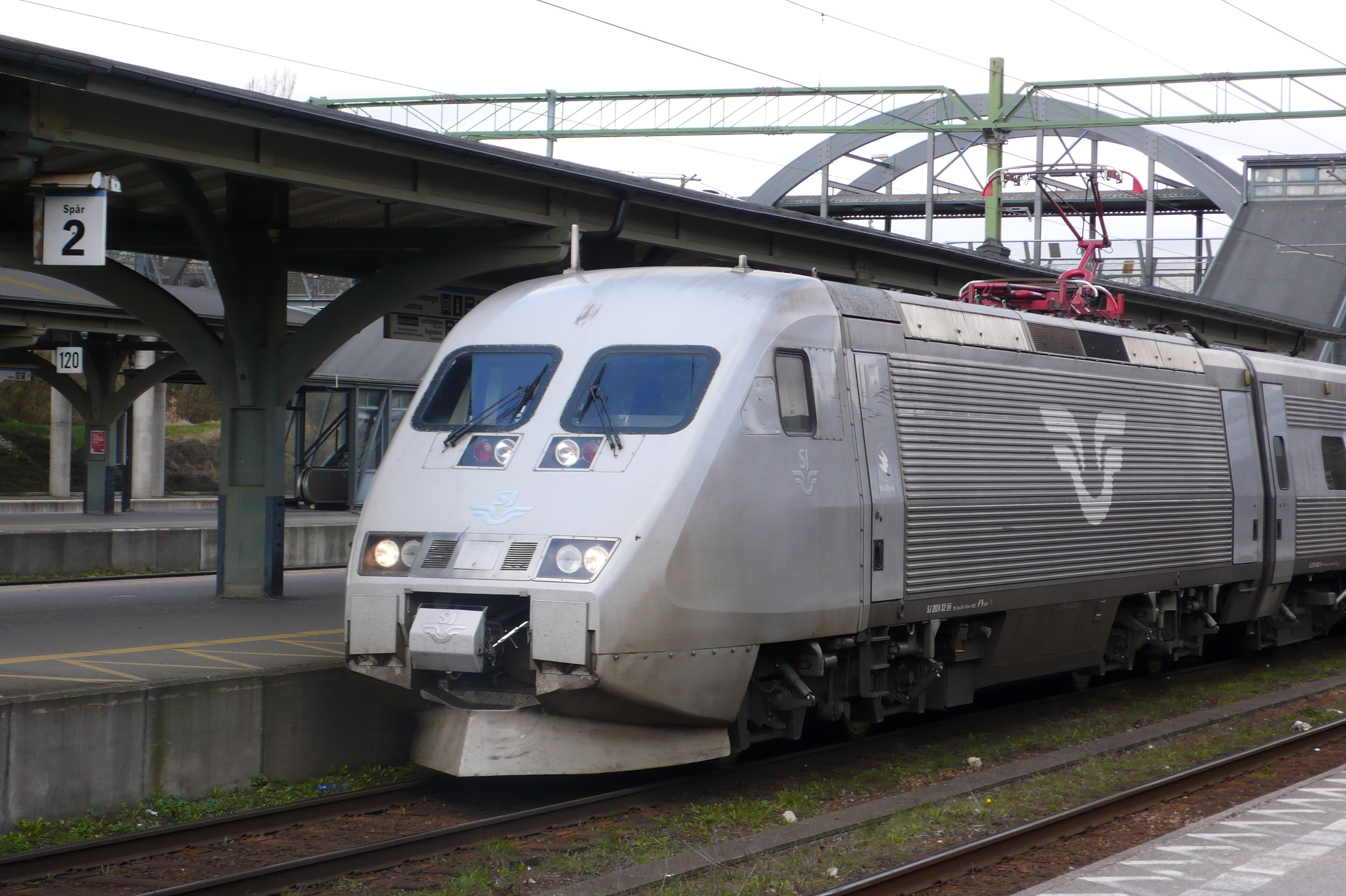
A Swedish X 2000 tilting train

During the 1990s there were several investigations into the use of tilting trains on existing tracks. In January 1990 it was reported that the NSW government was considering upgrading the existing state railway lines to utilise tilting train technology under development by Swedish-Swiss engineering giant ASEA Brown Boveri. This was at the same time as the VFT was under investigation, and there was concern that two fast railways could end up being built, which would then both be financially unviable. The tilt train concept could potentially reach speeds of up to 200 kilometres per hour (120 mph) while using the existing tracks.

From February to June 1995, CountryLink leased three X 2000 tilting carriages from Swedish Railways. The X 2000 carriages were driven by two XPT power cars in a push-pull configuration, and modified to provide hotel power. The train visited 39 cities and covered some 95,000 km during its tour of the state. 18,525 passengers were carried during an eight-week trial service between Sydney and Canberra. This service had a scheduled timetable of 3hrs 25min (compared to the 4hrs 07min of the existing XPLORER service), and recorded curve speeds up to 44% higher than XPT speed boards during regular service. Maximum speed was limited to 160 km/h, due to safety regulations at level crossings, as well as the physical demands on drivers in the non-tilting power cars.

The greatest challenge was the carriages' relatively wide clearance profile, which necessitated a targeted program of platform cutbacks and track slews on the Sydney-Canberra route. However, the trial was otherwise a great success. The track's transition curves were found to be well suited to the X2000's capability of 4° tilt angle per second. Furthermore, track studies indicated that the X2000 exerted lower track forces than the XPT, due to its self-steering bogies. The service was popular with passengers, who were impressed with the faster service and the features of the carriages.

While the speed improvement over the existing timetable was modest, it was estimated that the Sydney-Canberra timetable could be reduced to as low as 2hrs, with investment in track improvements and deviations in the order of $500 million. Media coverage of the trial focused on technical issues (particularly clearance and transitions), dubbing it a case of a "fast train on slow track." No major track work was undertaken, as the Federal government was awaiting the outcome of the alternative "Speedrail" proposal.

==== Speedrail proposal ====
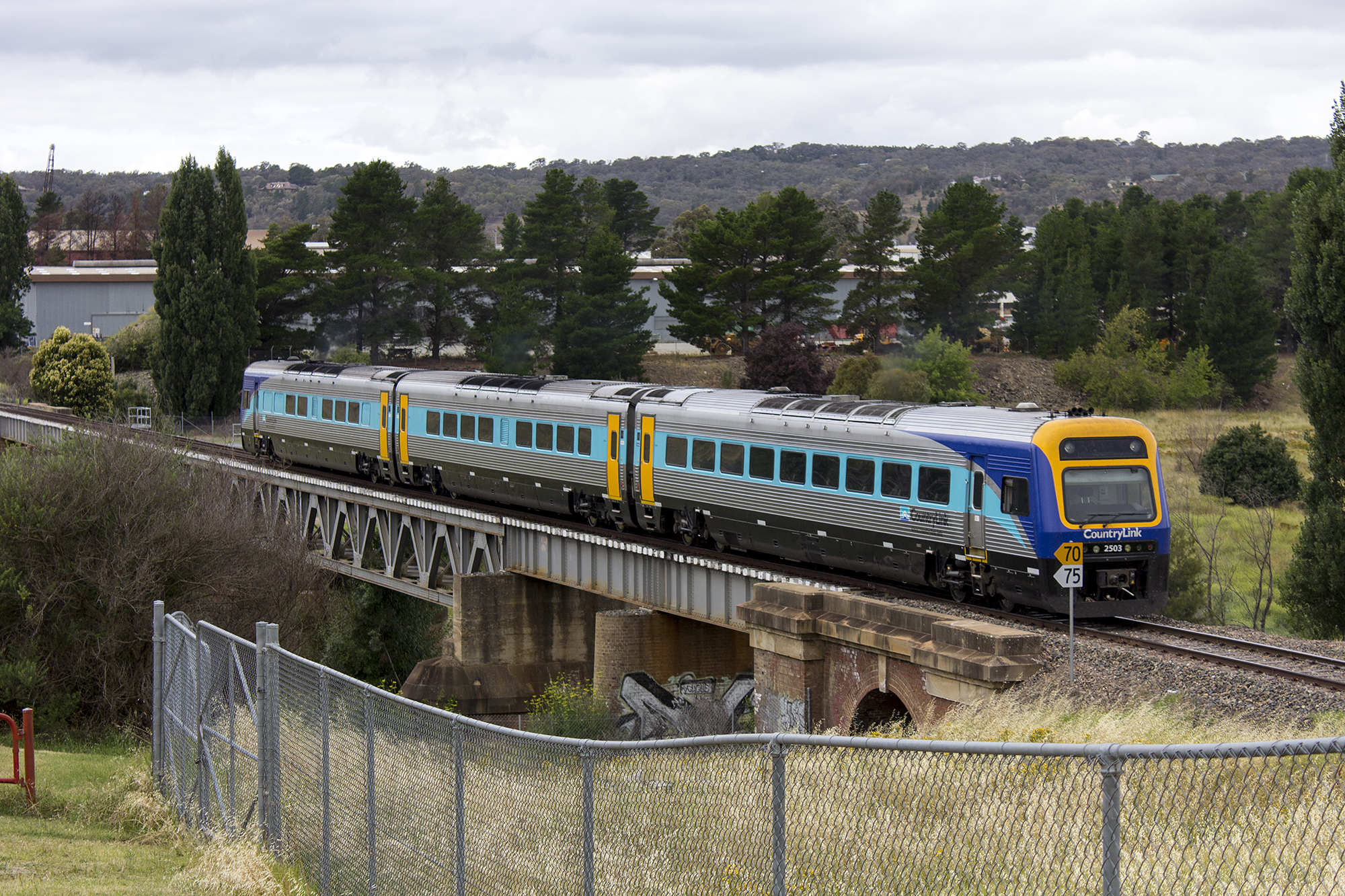
An Xplorer on the current, non-HSR Sydney-Canberra service

In 1993, the Speedrail Consortium (a joint venture between Alstom and Leighton Contractors) made a proposal for a high-speed rail link between Sydney and Canberra. It was initially going to cost A$2.4 billion ($4.1 billion in 2013). After years of delays and more claims that massive government subsidies would be required, in March 1997 the Commonwealth, New South Wales and ACT governments formally invited expressions of interest; by July, six proponents had been shortlisted. In December 1997, the government received four proposals, all accompanied by the required A$100,000 deposit. The proponents were:

- Capital Rail, backed by ASEA Brown Boveri, Adtranz, SwedeRail, BT Corporate Finance, Ove Arup, TMG International, Ansett and Virgin Rail Group. Their proposal was a $1.2 billion upgrade of the existing line, which would allow a 1 hour 45-minute service using a more powerful 250 km/h variant of the Swedish Railways X 2000 tilting electric multiple unit, dubbed XNEC.
- Inter-Capital Express, backed by AIDC Australia, GHD Transmark, Lend Lease, Siemens, TNT and GB Railways. Proposed journey time and cost the same as for Capital Rail, using similar tilt-train rollingstock and alignment upgrades.
- Speedrail Consortium, Backed by GEC Alsthom, Leighton Contractors, SNCF, Commonwealth Bank, Qantas, and Baulderstone Hornibrook. Proposal involved construction of a new alignment from Glenfield to Canberra at a cost of $2–2.6 billion, and the use of the existing Sydney metro rail network to access Central station. TGV technology would be used, giving a travel time of 1 hour, 20 minutes.
- Transrapid, backed by ThyssenKrupp, BHP, Boral, John Holland, Pacific Dunlop, Siemens and Adtranz, made a radical proposal for a 60-minute magnetic-levitation service via Wollongong. Detailed cost estimates were not given, but government sources estimated the cost to be at least $4 billion.

On 4 August 1998, Prime Minister John Howard announced that Speedrail was the preferred party, and gave the go ahead for the project to move into the 'proving up' stage, on the understanding that if the project proceeded, it would be at "no net cost to the taxpayer". It was predicted that construction would cost A$3.5 billion ($5.4 billion in 2013), with 15,000 new jobs created during the construction period. It was planned that the line would use the East Hills line to depart Sydney, and then follow the Hume and Federal highways into Canberra. There would be stations at Central, Campbelltown, Southern Highlands, Goulburn and Canberra Airport. Nine eight-car trainsets would be used, departing from each city at 45-minute intervals, and running at a maximum speed of 320 km/h (199 mph) to complete the journey in 81 minutes. The line was to operate under a build–own–operate model, that would allow a private company to manage the network, but would then be transferred to government after 30 years.

In November 1999, Speedrail submitted a feasibility study to the government, claiming that the project satisfied all the government's requirements. However, the media still speculated that A$1 billion in government assistance or tax concessions would be required. In December 2000, the federal government terminated the proposal due to fears it would require excessive subsidies.

=== 2000s ===
==== Howard government (2000) ====
In December 2000 in the wake of the termination of the Speedrail proposal, the Howard government commissioned TMG International Pty Ltd, leading a team of specialist subconsultants, including Arup, to investigate all aspects of the design and implementation of a high-speed rail system linking Melbourne, Canberra, Sydney and Brisbane. The East Coast Very High Speed Train Scoping Study – Phase 1 was released in November 2001 and cost A$2.3 million to prepare. It dealt with high-speed rail technologies, corridor selection, operating performance and transit times, project costs, projected demand, financing, and national development impacts. Although the preliminary study did not undertake a detailed corridor analysis, it recommended the selection of an inland route between Melbourne and Sydney, and a coastal route between Sydney and Brisbane.

The report concluded that although a high-speed rail system could have a place in Australia's transport future, it would require years of bipartisan political vision to realise (construction time was estimated at 10–20 years), and would most likely require significant financial investment from the government – up to 80% of construction costs. Construction cost estimates indicated a strong dependence on the chosen design speed; the construction costs for a double-track east coast high-speed railway would be (2001 A$):

- 250 km/h: $33 – $41 billion
- 350 km/h: $38 – $47 billion
- 500 km/h (maglev): $56 – $59 billion

These numbers do not include rollingstock or the cost of setting up the operating company. The report noted that these costs could be reduced somewhat upon detailed corridor analysis (especially the lower speed options) if sections of existing rail or highway corridor could be utilised.

In March 2002, the government decided not to go ahead with phase 2 of the scoping study due to the finding that an enormous amount of public funding would be required for the massive infrastructure project.

==== Canberra Business Council study ====
In April 2008 the Canberra Business Council made a submission to Infrastructure Australia, High Speed Rail for Australia: An opportunity for the 21st century. The submission detailed:

- Improvements in technology, competitiveness and supply over the previous decade.
- Travel demand on the East Coast. The Melbourne–Sydney air route is the fourth-busiest in the world, and the Sydney–Brisbane route ranks seventh in the Asia-Pacific region.
- Increased standard of living.
- Use for freight. High-speed freight trains are in use in France and soon to expand across Europe.
- Environmental sustainability and reduced greenhouse gas emissions.
- Energy efficiency.
- Better social outcomes, quality of life, and reduced social disadvantage for regional centres on the rail line.

==== Canberra Airport plan ====
In 2009, Canberra Airport proposed that it would be the most appropriate location for a Second Sydney Airport, providing a high-speed rail link was built that could reduce travel times between the cities to 50 minutes. Given the existing development within the Sydney basin, a HSR link will probably be required whatever site is chosen, yet the Canberra option save up to A$22 billion which would be needed to develop a greenfields airport site at Badgerys Creek or Wilton. In June 2012, Canberra Airport unveiled plans to build a A$140 million rail terminal at the airport if the high-speed link goes ahead.

==== Government-initiated study (2008–2013) ====
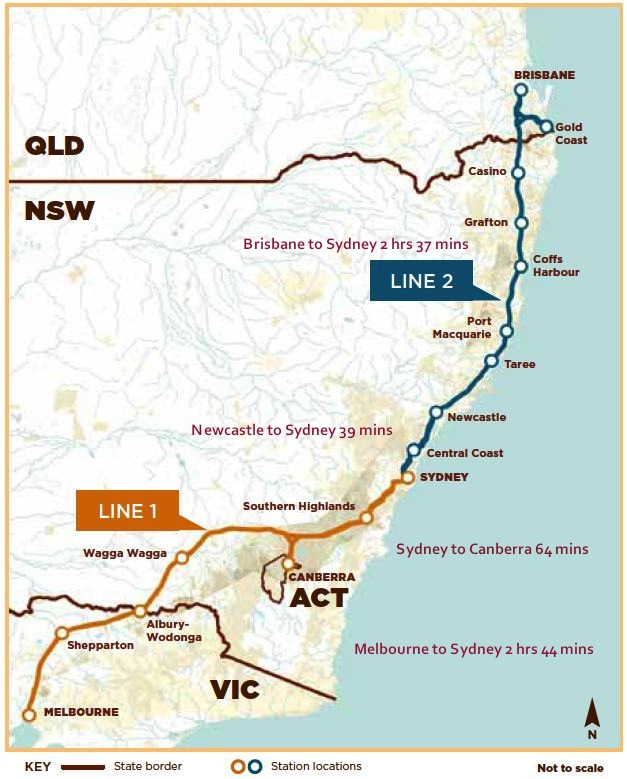
The preferred route in the 2013 report to the Australian Government for a high-speed rail line from Brisbane to Melbourne

===== Announcement of the study =====
In December 2008, the Rudd government announced that a Very Fast Train along the Sydney–Melbourne corridor, estimated to cost A$25 billion, was the government's highest infrastructure priority. On 31 October 2010, the Government issued the terms of reference for a strategic study to inform it and the New South Wales, Victorian, Queensland and Australian Capital Territory governments about implementation of HSR on the east coast of Australia between Melbourne and Brisbane—it cost $20 million and was undertaken in two phases.

The initiative was supported by both the Liberal opposition and the Australian Greens, the latter of which called for the study's scope to be extended to encompass Adelaide and Perth, a sentiment that was echoed by some.

In 2013 the Australian government released the finished study, with the proposed route linking Melbourne, Canberra, Sydney, and Brisbane.

===== Phase 1 =====
The report of phase 1, released on 4 August 2011, identified corridors and station locations and potential patronage, and gave indicative estimates of the cost. The first phase of the study was completed in 2011, projecting a financial cost for high-speed rail of between $61 and A$108 billion, depending on the route and station combination that was selected.

The phase 1 report found that an HSR corridor between Brisbane and Melbourne could:

- cost between A$61 billion and A$108 billion (2011 dollars)
- involve more than 1,600 kilometres of new standard-gauge, double-track
- achieve speeds of up to 350 kilometres per hour and offer journey times as low as 3 hours between both Brisbane and Sydney and Sydney and Melbourne, 40 minutes from Sydney to Newcastle, and 1 hour between Sydney and Canberra
- carry about 54 million passengers a year by 2036
- offer competitive ticket prices.

The report noted that acquiring, or otherwise preserving the corridor in the short term could reduce future costs by reducing the likelihood of additional tunnels as urban areas grow and preferred corridors become unavailable.

===== Phase 2 =====
Work on phase 2 of the study started in late 2011 and culminated in the release of the High speed rail study phase 2 report on 11 April 2013. Building on the work of phase 1, it was more comprehensive in objectives and scope, and refined many of the phase 1 estimates, particularly demand and cost estimates.

The phase 2 report found that:

- the corridor would comprise about 1,750 kilometres of dedicated route linking Brisbane, Sydney, Canberra and Melbourne
- the preferred alignment included four capital city stations, four city-peripheral stations, and stations at the Gold Coast, Casino, Grafton, Coffs Harbour, Port Macquarie, Taree, Newcastle, Southern Highlands, Wagga Wagga, Albury-Wodonga and Shepparton
- once fully operational (from 2065) [sic], the corridor could carry about 84 million passengers a year
- express journey times would be less than three hours between Melbourne and Sydney and between Sydney and Brisbane
- optimal staging for the HSR program would involve building the Sydney–Melbourne line first, starting with Sydney–Canberra, followed by Canberra–Melbourne, Newcastle–Sydney, Brisbane–Gold Coast and Gold Coast–Newcastle
- the estimated cost of constructing the corridor in its entirety would be about A$114 billion (2012 dollars)
- the HSR program and the majority of its individual stages would be expected to produce only a small positive financial return on investment, so governments would need to fund the majority of the upfront capital costs
- if passenger projections were met at the fare levels proposed, the HSR system could generate sufficient revenue from fares and other activities to meet operating costs without ongoing public subsidy
- HSR would substantially improve accessibility for the regional centres it served and provide opportunity for – although not the automatic realisation of – regional development.

===== Favoured alignment =====
Also released alongside the phase 2 report were 280 detailed maps showing the preferred alignment identified in the study. They resolve the various earlier alternative routes outlined in the Wikipedia article Corridor selection history for Australian High-Speed Rail.

	Sydney–Melbourne	Sydney–Brisbane	Sydney–Canberra
Great-circle distance	713 km (443 mi)	732 km (455 mi)	247 km (153 mi)
Existing rail distance	963 km (598 mi) (32% greater)	988 km (614 mi) (28% greater)	329 km (204 mi) (25% greater)
Existing rail average speed	92 km/h (57 mph)	73 km/h (45 mph)	76 km/h (47 mph)
Existing rail travel time (h:min)	10:30	13:35	4:19
Existing rail services (daily, each way)	2	1	3
Air travel time (CBD to CBD*) (h:min)	3:00	3:05	1:35
Air services (daily, each way)	118	84	29
High-speed rail travel time (max. 350 km/h)	2:45	4:24	1:04

Air travel time includes travel from CBD to airport, waiting at terminal, gate-to-gate transit, and travel to destination CBD.

===== Issues =====
The major issues preventing the adoption of high-speed rail include, according to Philip Laird:

- a high level of competition in domestic air travel, resulting in highly affordable fares.
- excessive domestic air transport subsidies.
- that the great inter-city distances exceed those for which high-speed rail can compete effectively against aircraft.
- a perception of cheap car travel.
- a lack of tolls on the majority of inter-capital roads.

=== 2010s ===
==== Abbott government (2013–2015) ====
On 8 November 2013 the High Speed Rail Advisory Group, charged with part of the planning for a very fast train between Brisbane and Melbourne, was one of 20 government committees and councils identified to be wound up as part of the newly elected Abbott government's initial efforts to cut costs and "ensure that the machinery of government is as efficient and as small as possible".

However, the following month, former Deputy Prime Minister Warren Truss announced that the Coalition was committed to acquiring the land corridor identified by the previous government's study, and that he was personally seeking the co-operation of the premiers of Victoria, New South Wales and Queensland, and the Chief Minister of the ACT.

The Labor Party indicated it would support the move.

==== Beyond Zero Emissions study (2014) ====
In 2014, the low-carbon advocacy group Beyond Zero Emissions released a detailed study in response to the Rudd government's Phase 2 report. Prepared in collaboration with the German Aerospace Centre, the study used many of the same cost assumptions but proposed a modified route to minimise construction expense. Although slightly longer (1799 km compared to 1748 km), the length in tunnel was reduced by 44%, and the length on bridges by 25%. Much of the reduction came through making greater use of existing transport corridors for metropolitan access; the government study took the politically uncomplicated but extremely expensive option of simply tunnelling to the terminal stations. Project author Gerard Drew also criticised the Phase 2 Report's 45-year construction timeline, calling it "laughable". Drew also suggested that there was significant "gold plating" evident in the government report's cost estimates. BZE forecast that the high-speed railway would cost $84.3 billion and take 10 years to construct.

==== Turnbull government (2015–2018) ====
When leadership of the Liberal Party changed to Malcolm Turnbull, a noted rail enthusiast, the Federal Government revived talk of high-speed rail proposals for Australia, with a focus on private-sector proposals and value-capture funding models.

In March 2016 the government received an unsolicited proposal from a group called Consolidated Land and Rail Australia (CLARA), proposing a very fast railway (500 km/h class) between Sydney and Melbourne. Rather than serving existing population centres, the proposal centred on creating 8 new inland cities as commuter towns for Sydney and Melbourne, with construction of both the cities and the railway to be funded by land sales. Clara claimed to have already secured purchase options for 40% of the land required for the cities.

In April 2017, Spanish rollingstock manufacturer Talgo presented an unsolicited proposal to the NSW government, in which it was proposed to utilize passively tilting diesel rollingstock, capable of speeds up to 200 km/h, to increase speeds on the Sydney-Canberra line. With minimal modifications to the existing track, Talgo claimed a travel time as low as 2-2.5hrs could be achieved. The manufacturer offered to bring a Talgo trainset to New South Wales for testing at no cost.

In the May 2017 Federal Budget, the federal government announced $20 million in funding, matching that provided by state/territory or private proponents, for the development of up to three business cases focusing on delivering high-speed rail links between capital cities and regional Australia. Submissions will be appraised by Infrastructure Australia, with the funds to be allocated to the successful proponents. Further funding would be considered following completion of the business case(s).

==== New South Wales (Late 2018) ====
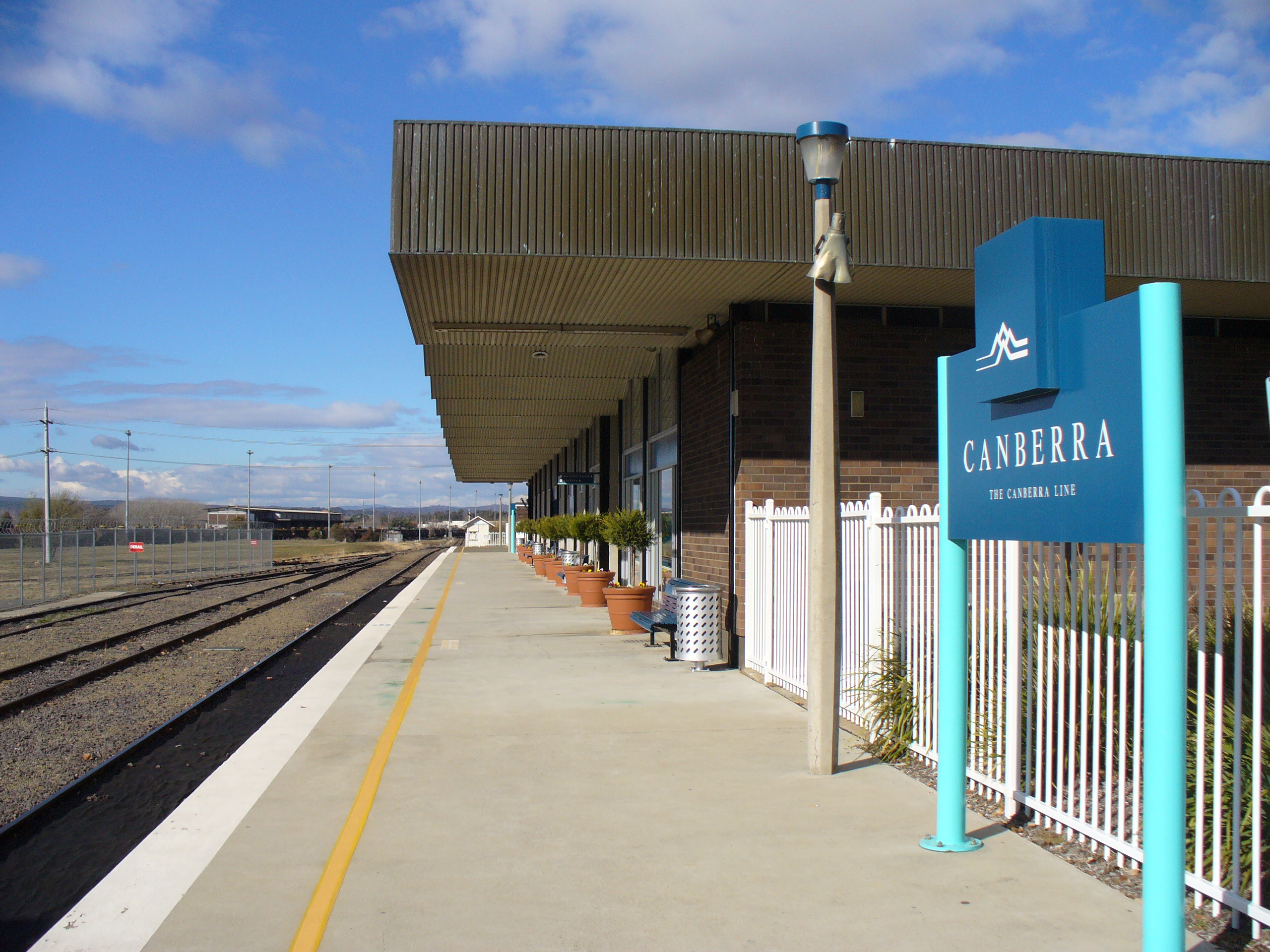
Canberra railway station, the terminus of the Southern Xplorer service from Sydney, which currently takes approximately four hours

In late 2018, the New South Wales Berejiklian ministry announced a new high-speed rail network connecting Sydney and regional NSW. The government was to spend $4.6 million on investigating four identified potential routes. These were Sydney to Port Macquarie, Orange/Parkes, Nowra and Canberra. The proposal offered the following travel times (in hours):

Journey	Current journey time	< 200 km/h	> 250 km/h
Sydney-Canberra	4:07	3:00	1:00
Sydney-Goulburn	2:31	1:45	0:30
Sydney-Newcastle	2:35	2:00	0:45
Sydney-Gosford	1:19	1:00	0:30
Sydney-Wollongong	1:25	1:00	0:30

On 24 December 2022, the head of the study, Professor Andrew McNaughton, remarked that in his opinion that upgrading "the corridor between Sydney and the Hunter" would make "the biggest difference to the biggest number of people". He regarded the Sydney-Goulburn and Sydney-Canberra corridors as lower priority, while remarking that those on the Sydney-Orange/Parkes corridor "just need a decent train service".

As of 24 December 2022, the study report had not yet been released, but NSW Cities Minister Rob Stokes commented that McNaughton's work had been "invaluable", and that his recommendations were "demonstrated in our six cities plan to better connect the cities of metropolitan NSW"; Stokes had also written to the federal infrastructure minister Catherine King, asking the newly created High Speed Rail Authority to work with the NSW Greater Cities Commission in regards to planning around the proposed new and upgraded corridors.

On 3 March 2023, it was reported by The Guardian that the New South Wales Government had, per confidential documents, halted work on the final business case for the Sydney-Newcastle corridor in December 2022 due to it being considered a responsibility for the Federal Government's High Speed Rail Authority.

Internal documents from the study obtained in January 2025 indicated that a line from Sydney (Olympic Park) to Gosford (via Epping) would cost $25 billion to $30 billion, and extending the line to Wyong and Tuggerah would increase the cost to between $27 billion and $32 billion. Options for a corridor to the north were investigated but never costed.

==== Victoria (2018–2023) ====
In the 2018 Victorian Budget in April, planning for a fast rail link between Melbourne and Geelong was announced. Later in September 2018, the Victorian State Government announced a Fast Rail Reference Group of technical advisors for a high-speed rail line to Geelong. This followed an allocation of $50 million for planning for the line in the 2018 state budget. The fast rail link formed part of the Labor government's Western Rail Plan announced before the 2018 Victorian state election. The plan would see regional trains run to Geelong and Ballarat at speeds up to 250 km/h, an increase on the current 160 km/h limit of V/Line VLocity trains. This would lead to a travel time between Geelong and Melbourne of 45 minutes and less than an hour to Ballarat. To achieve this, rail lines would be electrified and quadrupled to Wyndham Vale and Melton to separate regional and metropolitan services. The new fast lines would likely utilise a new Sunshine-CBD rail tunnel to be built as part of the Melbourne Airport rail link, and could use new electrified rolling stock. Under the plan, Sunshine railway station would become a key interchange for high-speed rail and metropolitan services in Melbourne's west. Planning for the high-speed rail will occur alongside the business case for the Airport Rail link, and all projects will likely take a decade to complete, with construction set to begin by 2022.

The plan expands upon current duplication and improvement works to regional passenger rail lines by the State Government's $1.75 billion Regional Rail Revival project.

In March 2019, the Federal Coalition government pledged $2 billion for a fast rail line to Geelong, promising a maximum speed of 200 km/h, an average travel speed of 160 km/h and a travel time of 32 minutes. The Federal Government claimed this project would have a total cost of $4 billion. The Victorian Transport Minister Jacinta Allan welcomed extra federal funding but dismissed some of the claims about the project, arguing it would cost between $10 and $15 billion, would require the removal of 14 level crossings, and that the federal pledge did not include the cost of new rolling stock.

In November 2023, following a review of the national infrastructure pipeline, it was recommended that funding be removed from the project.

==== National Faster Rail Agency (2019–2023) ====
National Faster Rail Agency
Agency overview
- Formed: 1 July 2019
- Dissolved: 13 June 2023
- Superseding agency: High Speed Rail Authority
- Parent department: Department of Infrastructure, Transport, Regional Development and Communications

In the 2019–20 Budget, the Australian Government established a National Faster Rail Agency to produce a number of business cases for higher-speed rail between capital cities and regional centres. The Government allocated $40 million to assess five fast rail corridors:

- Sydney to Wollongong
- Sydney to Parkes (via Bathurst and Orange)
- Melbourne to Albury-Wodonga
- Melbourne to Traralgon
- Brisbane to the Gold Coast

These assessments were in addition to the three business cases already underway, started under the Turnbull government, examining the following corridors:

- Melbourne to Greater Shepparton
- Sydney to Newcastle
- Brisbane to the regions of Moreton Bay and the Sunshine Coast

The National Faster Rail Agency was established on 1 July 2019 as an Executive Agency within the Infrastructure, Transport, Cities and Regional Development portfolio.

===== Issues and cost estimate =====
In April 2022, the National Faster Rail Agency published the National Faster Rail Investment Program document, part of which was dedicated to high-speed rail. The document explained that as of 2022, their cost estimate for the Melbourne-Sydney-Brisbane HSR corridor was between $200 and $300 billion - significantly higher than the $114 billion cost outlined in Phase 2 of the High-Speed Rail Study - due to reasons including that:

- Recent costings show substantially higher cost per kilometre,
- Concerns were raised over terrain, community acceptance, environmental degradation and industry capacity,
- Previous costings were high level, based on broad plans, had insufficient contingency and were not detailed, and
- Higher costings were incurred across the infrastructure program.

=== 2020s ===
==== High Speed Rail Authority (2023–present) ====
In September 2022, the then-recently elected Albanese government introduced legislation to establish a new national High Speed Rail Authority (HSRA), fulfilling a promise made during the 2022 election. The Infrastructure Minister Catherine King said the Authority would have an expert board and be tasked with overseeing "the construction and operation of a high-speed rail network along Australia's eastern seaboard" between Melbourne, Canberra, Sydney and Brisbane. The Authority would consult with state governments, give advice to the federal government, and develop standards to ensure an interoperable high-speed rail network across jurisdictions. King announced the Authority would advance the government's first priority of providing higher-speed rail between Newcastle and Sydney, to which the government committed $500 million to commence early works and secure corridors. The Bill would abolish the National Faster Rail Agency and absorb its functions into the new authority. The Bill was passed by both houses on 24 November 2022, and gained assent on 12 December 2022.

The authority commenced operations on 13 June 2023, and the CEO Tim Parker was appointed on 11 January 2024.

On 26 August 2024 the Minister for Infrastructure, Transport, Regional Development and Local Government Catherine King announced that work was being conducted by the High Speed Rail Authority on determining the locations for this project, utilising thirty boreholes for this purpose.

===== Sydney to Newcastle section =====
====== Business case ======
On 30 January 2024, it was announced that $78.8 million of funding would be released for the development of a business case for the Sydney to Newcastle section of the high-speed rail network. The tenders for the business case were released in March 2024 and were split into eight packages. The eight successful tenderers were announced on 13 June 2024.

On 16 December 2024, the final business case was submitted to the Albanese government. The business case found that a line with stops in Western Sydney Airport, Parramatta, Sydney Central, Gosford, Morisset, and Newcastle (for a 90-minute trip time between the ends) would generate $250 billion in economic opportunities by 2086 and cut carbon emissions by 86,000 tonnes. However, the capital costs were redacted upon publication in February 2026, though the delivery costs were estimated at $93 billion. 115 km (71 mi) of tunneling at 7.6 m (25 ft) diameter would be required, as would construction of 38 km (24 mi) of viaducts. Transport minister Catherine King noted in a press release at the time that the Federal Government has only committed $660 million towards development funding, including critical design work.

==== Fastrack Australia proposal (2023) ====
In January 2023, advocacy group Fastrack Australia published a plan that proposed gradually upgrading the Sydney-Melbourne corridor, instead of building a completely new line from scratch. The proposed upgrades were split into five stages, with the following estimated travel times:

Stage	Travel time (hours and minutes)		
Stage	Sydney– Melbourne	Melbourne– Canberra	Sydney– Canberra
Current	11:00	10:30	4:12
Stage 1	9:00	8:30	3:00
Stage 2	8:00	7:00	2:12
Stage 3	6:00	5:00	2:00
Stage 4	5:00	4:00	1:42
Stage 5	4:00	3:00	1:30

The first two stages would consist of the following upgrades:

- Stage 1: straightening out track on the Wentworth Deviation between Glenfield and Mittagong, and
- Stage 2: track between Goulburn and Yass, and a new track branching from Gunning down to a new station near Canberra airport.

The leader of Fastrack Australia, Garry Glazebrook, stated that he estimated the first two stages would cost $5bn and $6–7bn respectively. As of 24 February 2023, Fastrack Australia had sent their proposal to Prime Minister Anthony Albanese and the federal infrastructure minister Catherine King, but were yet to receive a response.

==== Intrastate proposals ====
At various times, state political parties and others have proposed schemes involving fast trains in other localities that included the potential to achieve speeds above the 200 km/h threshold.

In 2004, the Government of New South Wales proposed a A$2 billion privately funded underground and above-ground train line Western FastRail that would link the Sydney CBD with Western Sydney. The concept was re-proposed in December 2006 by then federal Opposition Leader Kevin Rudd during a visit to Penrith, as part of the Australian Labor Party's election platform. The plan received approving comments by the NSW State Government. The line was also backed by a consortium led by union leader Michael Easson, which includes Dutch bank ABN AMRO and Australian construction company Leighton Contractors. Elements of the proposal were incorporated into the Government's West Metro and CBD Relief Line projects. However, these plans were abandoned following the election of the O'Farrell government in 2011.

In 2008, Transrapid made a proposal to the Government of Victoria to build a privately funded and operated magnetic levitation (maglev) line to serve the Greater Melbourne metropolitan area. It was presented as an alternative to the Cross-City Tunnel proposed in the Eddington Transport Report, which neglected to investigate above-ground transport options. The maglev route would connect Geelong to metropolitan Melbourne's outer suburban growth corridors, Tullamarine and Avalon domestic and international terminals in under 20 minutes, continuing to Frankston, Victoria, in under 30 minutes. It would serve a population of over 4 million people, and Transrapid claimed a price of A$4 billion. However, the Victorian government dismissed the proposal in favour of the underground metropolitan network suggested by the Eddington Report.

In 2010, Western Australia's Public Transport Authority completed a feasibility study into a high-speed rail link between Perth and Bunbury. The route would follow the existing narrow gauge Mandurah line to Anketell, then the Kwinana Freeway and Forrest Highway to Lake Clifton, including 140 km (87 mi) of new track. It would replace the existing Transwa Australind passenger service, the route of which is under increasing use for freight traffic. The proposed service would have a maximum speed of 160 km/h (99 mph), at which the travel time from Perth Underground to a new station in central Bunbury would be 91 minutes. The corridor would allow for future upgrade to 200 km/h (120 mph).

In the lead-up to the 2010 Victorian state election, Liberal leader Ted Baillieu promised to spend A$4 million to set up a high-speed rail advocacy unit, with the goal of ensuring Melbourne hosted Australia's first high-speed trains. He expressed support for an east coast link, and extensions west of Melbourne to Geelong and Adelaide.

The 2010 Infrastructure Partnerships Australia report identified Noosa-Brisbane-Gold Coast as a potentially viable high-speed rail link, and a possible precursor to a full east-coast system. The report predicted that a 350 km/h (220 mph) system would reduce travel times between Cooroy (22 km west of Noosa) and Brisbane to 31 minutes (currently 2:08 hours), capturing as much as 84% of the total commuter market. Travel time between Brisbane and the Gold Coast would be reduced to 21 minutes, capturing up to 27% of commuters.

Soon after winning the 2011 New South Wales state election, the incoming Liberal premier Barry O'Farrell advocated high-speed rail lines to Melbourne and Brisbane instead of a second Sydney airport, saying of a new airport site in NSW: "Whether the central coast, the south-west or the western suburbs [of Sydney], find me an area that is not going to end up causing enormous grief to people who currently live around it".

== Speed records ==
The Australian rail speed record is presently held by Queensland Rail's Electric Tilt Train, which achieved 210 km/h during a test run on 23 May 1999. It remains the only time a train in Australia has exceeded 200 km/h. Modifications to the tracks were required to achieve the record speed.

Conversely, the narrow gauge portion of The Ghan passenger service in 1980, was noted as having an average speed of 17 mph or a little over 27 km/h. The narrow gauge portion of the journey from Marree to Alice Springs covered a distance of 539 miles or 869 kilometres.

The earliest known reference to Australia's "fastest train" dates from 1916, when the Melbourne Express (later known as The Overland) introduced a faster timetable between Murray Bridge and Wolseley, achieving an average speed of 35 mph (56.3 km/h), and a maximum of 58 mph (93.3 km/h).

The Kalgoorlie Prospector was often referred to "Australia's fastest train" upon its introduction in 1971, however this claim was based on its end-to-end average speed of 85 km/h, rather than maximum speed; the Prospector has never held the maximum speed record. The WAGR WCA class railcars had a design speed of 145 km/h, but seldom exceeded 130 km/h in service. A trial run on 30 and 31 March 1987 cut two hours from the previous schedule, and reached speeds as high as 150 km/h (93 mph).

The New South Wales XPT broke the record during a test run on 9 September 1981, where it reached 183 km/h. It broke its own record 11 years later, on 18 September 1992, reaching 193 km/h. On both occasions the maximum speed achieved fell short of the target speed of 200 km/h.

Date	Train	Location	Speed	Notes
1916	Melbourne Express	Ninety Mile Desert, South Australia; From Murray Bridge to Wolseley	35 mph (56.3 km/h) (average); 58 mph (93.3 km/h) (maximum)	
1927	Geelong Flyer	From Flinders Street to Geelong, Victoria	45 mph (72.4 km/h) (average); 70 mph (112.7 km/h) (maximum)	
11 November 1929	Caves Express	From Parramatta to Penrith, New South Wales	54 mph (86.9 km/h) (average)	
30 April 1934	Creamy Kate	Between Douglas Park and Menangle, south of Sydney	75 mph (120.7 km/h)	
17 November 1937	Spirit of Progress	Between Werribee and Laverton, near Geelong, Victoria	79.5 mph (127.9 km/h)	
1947	Spirit of Progress	North East railway line, Victoria	84 mph (135.2 km/h)	
28 April 1951	Budd Rail Diesel Car	Between Cook (SA) and Rawlinna (WA) on the Nullarbor Plain	90 mph (144.8 km/h)	
1 December 1951	The Trans-Australian	Between Cook (SA) and Rawlinna (WA) on the Nullarbor Plain	92 mph (148.1 km/h)	
6 September 1981	XPT	Between Table Top and Gerogery, southern NSW	183 km/h (113.7 mph)	
18 September 1992	XPT	Between Table Top and Yerong Creek, southern NSW	193 km/h (119.9 mph)	
23 May 1999	QR Electric Tilt Train	Between Meadowvale and Avondale, near Bundaberg, Queensland.	210 km/h (130.5 mph)	

== See also ==
- Rail transport in Australia
- Corridor selection history for Australian high-speed rail
