= High Speed Rail Authority =

Government authority responsible for high-speed rail in Australia

Authority overview
- Formed: 13 June 2023
- Jurisdiction: Australia
- Annual budget: $7.6 million AUD (2025–26)
- Minister responsible: Catherine King, Minister for Infrastructure, Transport, Regional Development and Local Government
- Authority executives: Tim Parker, CEO; Jill Rossouw, Chair
- Parent department: Department of Infrastructure, Transport, Regional Development, Communications and the Arts (DITRDCA)
- Website: www.hsra.gov.au

The High Speed Rail Authority (HSRA) is a statutory agency of the Australian Government tasked with advising on, planning, developing, and overseeing the construction and operation of an eventual high-speed rail network along Australia's eastern seaboard.

The HSRA was part of a commitment made in November 2021 by the then-opposition Labor Party (and a further announcement by its leader Anthony Albanese in January 2022) to build a high-speed rail line from Sydney to Newcastle, as part of an eventual network from Melbourne to Brisbane. Legislation to establish the HSRA was introduced in September 2022 and received assent in December 2022. The HSRA commenced operations on 13 June 2023, and its CEO was appointed on 11 January 2024. The National Faster Rail Agency was abolished on the commencement of the High Speed Rail Authority.

The HSRA is currently developing a business case for the Sydney to Newcastle section of the East Coast high-speed rail network, with $500 million allocated by the Australian Government for planning and corridor works. Tenders for the development of the business case were released in March 2024 and successful tenderers were announced in June 2024. These announcements were followed in August 2024 by the commencement of geotechnical investigations and a briefing for industry. In December 2024, the business case for the Sydney to Newcastle section was provided to the government, along with a Product Definition Report. (Note: The report, per the Authority, would include advice on corridor preservation, stakeholder engagement and environmental planning for the entire network.) The business case has been reviewed by Infrastructure Australia, and its assessment was released on 6 November 2025.

== Establishment and previous incarnations ==
Prior to the establishment of the Authority, the government had tasked the National Faster Rail Agency to explore a variety of faster rail options.

In a speech in Newcastle on 2 January 2022, then-Opposition Leader Anthony Albanese promised, if he was successful in the 2022 federal election, to build a high-speed rail line between Sydney and Newcastle. Part of this commitment included an allocation of $500 million for planning, land purchases and early works, along with establishing a dedicated authority to deliver an eventual line from Melbourne to Brisbane. This mirrored a similar announcement by the Labor Party in November 2021, and a similar promise made at the 2019 federal election. The promise was criticised by members of the Liberal Party, with the then-Urban Infrastructure Minister Paul Fletcher saying that Albanese "[needed] to come clean" regarding the cost and the party vice-president Teena McQueen saying the proposal was "not cost effective". In contrast, The Australia Institute's Ebony Bennett said that it was a "smart announcement", adding that it would be popular "in areas [...] that stand to benefit a lot", including Newcastle.

In September 2022, the recently elected Albanese government introduced legislation to establish a new national High Speed Rail Authority. The Infrastructure Minister Catherine King said the Authority would have an expert board and be tasked with overseeing "the construction and operation of a high-speed rail network along Australia's eastern seaboard" between Melbourne, Canberra, Sydney and Brisbane. The authority would consult with state governments, give advice to the federal government, and develop standards to ensure an interoperable high-speed rail network across jurisdictions. King announced the Authority would advance the government's first priority of providing high-speed rail between Sydney and Newcastle, to which the government committed $500 million to commence early works and secure corridors. The Bill would abolish the National Faster Rail Agency and absorb its functions into the new authority. The Bill was passed by both houses on 24 November 2022, and gained assent on 12 December 2022.

The authority commenced operations on 13 June 2023, at which time the National Faster Rail Agency ceased operations, and all employees were transferred to either the Authority or the DITRDCA. The CEO Tim Parker was appointed on 11 January 2024.

== Board structure ==
Per the High Speed Rail Authority Act 2022, the board of the Authority consists of the Chair and four other members, who are all appointed by — and report to — the minister. The board is required to hold at least four meetings per year.

As of 2024, the board members are:

- Jill Rossouw, Chair
- Gillian Brown, Member
- Ian Hunt, Member
- Dyan Perry OBE, Member
- Neil Scales OBE, Member

== Planning ==
=== Sydney to Newcastle section ===
==== First half of 2024 ====
On 30 January 2024, it was announced that $78.8 million of funding would be released for the development of a business case for the Sydney to Newcastle section of the high-speed rail network. The tenders for the business case were released in March 2024 and were split into eight packages, including:

- Project controls (costs, schedule and risk)
- Rail operations planning
- First Nations participation and engagement, and
- Commercial, delivery strategy and industry engagement.

In response to tender documents suggesting the consideration of a potential station at Broadmeadow (in contrast to the 2013 Phase 2 report, which suggested a station "located outside the current urban areas" of Newcastle), Tim Parker said that a line from Sydney to Broadmeadow was "achievable".

The successful tenderers were announced on 13 June 2024, with the contracts being awarded to the following companies:

Package	Successful tenderer(s)
Project Control Services (Costs, Schedule and Risks)	KPMG
Economics, Funding and Financing, Demand Modelling and Economic Development Strategy	EY
Commercial, Delivery Strategy and Industry Engagement	EY
Transport, Land Use and Property	WSP
Technical Advisory, Environment and Sustainability, Community and Stakeholder Engagement	WSP and Arcadis (Note: With assistance from specialist partners (including Ineco))
High Speed Rail Network Operations Planning	Arup (Note: Later partnered with SYSTRA)
First Nations Participation and Engagement	GHD
First Nations Culture and Heritage	GHD

==== Second half of 2024 ====
Geotechnical investigations (starting with drilling of 27 boreholes along the Sydney to Newcastle corridor) commenced on 26 August 2024, ahead of an industry briefing the next day. Starting in November 2024, six of these boreholes were drilled in Brisbane Water and the Hawkesbury River on the Central Coast using two drilling rigs.

The Authority's geology advisor David Och said that the area along the proposed route had a diverse range of landscapes (from "spectacular sandstone plateaus" to "deeply dissected valleys"), fault zones and igneous dikes, along with varying types of vegetation. These features, Och said, were "the primary focus" of the investigations. Another focus of the geotechnical investigations was the Hawkesbury River, due to the need to determine the "sediment thickness, bedrock depth and quality" on the river. These investigations, according to Och, were aimed at enabling "future drilling to target any geotechnical risk" that was identified during the initial geotechnical investigations and to ensure "safety and efficiency in future construction".

At an industry briefing for the Sydney to Newcastle section on 27 August 2024, Tim Parker gave a presentation suggesting the following:

- Up to 100 km (62 mi) of the line would be in tunnels, including beneath the Hawkesbury River and Brisbane Water,
- The section between Gosford and Newcastle would largely be above-ground, and
- The first construction contracts could be signed by 2027 if the federal government made an investment in 2025.

Parker also gave the following target travel times:

Travel times from Newcastle
Destination	Target travel time
Gosford	30 minutes
Central	1 hour
Parramatta (Note: Prospective station.)	1 hour 10 minutes

An information hub and office were opened in Newcastle in December 2024. Parker said that the hub would enable people to "come in and have a discussion" about the project, and to enable people who were "very excited [...] but not sure" what high-speed rail was to see "what high-speed rail [sic] will look like".

==== Business case assessment ====
On 6 November 2025, Infrastructure Australia released a positive assessment of the business case, recommending that a two-year "development phase" go ahead. It outlines a potential opening date of 2037 for a Central Coast to Newcastle section, before being extended to Sydney by 2039 and to Western Sydney Airport by 2042. The CEO of Public Transport Association Australia New Zealand (PTAANZ) Lauren Streifer and the Central Coast regional director of the Property Council Nuatali Nelmes expressed support for the assessment, along with HSRA CEO Parker and transport minister Catherine King, although Nelmes later said that improved housing strategies and delivery would be "essential" for high-speed rail to create "liveable, affordable communities".

==== Comments ====
In January 2025, the head of the Australasian Railway Association Caroline Wilkie commented that the proposed rail line provided an "opportunity to capitalise on" the workforce developed by underground metro rail projects in Sydney, Brisbane and Melbourne. Wilkie also said that the line, if delivered, would "unlock opportunities for economic and social prosperity".

At the time of the industry briefing in August 2024, the shadow transport minister Bridget McKenzie commented that while the Coalition would "deliver [sic] the business case" for the Sydney to Newcastle section, she also commented that details were yet to be provided on "where it's [sic] proposal is going, what it will cost or who will be paying for it". When drilling commenced on the Central Coast in November 2024, McKenzie labelled it a "Utopia-like stunt" that suggested "‘work has started’ on a [sic] high-speed rail" and opined that unless details were provided on funding and delivery, high-speed rail would be "just another infrastructure fantasy project".

In November 2024, former Liberal member for Bennelong John Alexander suggested building stations just outside of major towns and cities to allow for new housing development. Alexander opined that this would allow for significant value capture and therefore allow the government to recoup the cost of the project. He criticised the potential station locations for this reason, saying that a station in Gosford would not result in an "uplift" in property values due to it being built up and surrounded by water, while saying that a potential station in Broadmeadow was "equally flawed".

The preference for Central being the main station was also criticised on demographic and practical grounds:

- The Lord Mayor of Parramatta Martin Zaiter suggested that Central was no longer the centre of Sydney's population, and that the choice of station reflected a view of Sydney that was "rooted in the past".
- Andrew McNaughton, who led an investigation into high-speed rail in NSW from late 2018, thought that Central was a "very constrained site" in terms of underground works, and that there were "better places" to locate a station.

=== Future sections ===
==== Melbourne to Canberra section ====
In October 2024, Tim Parker said that the Victorian end of the line should start at Southern Cross railway station (although he thought a link to Geelong "would make sense") and include a stop at Melbourne Airport. The line would extend on to Shepparton, Albury and would eventually connect with the line from Sydney. Parker also said that the line should both be built and start operating in small segments.

== See also ==
- High-speed rail in Australia
