= Bus transport in Queensland =

Bus services in Queensland, Australia

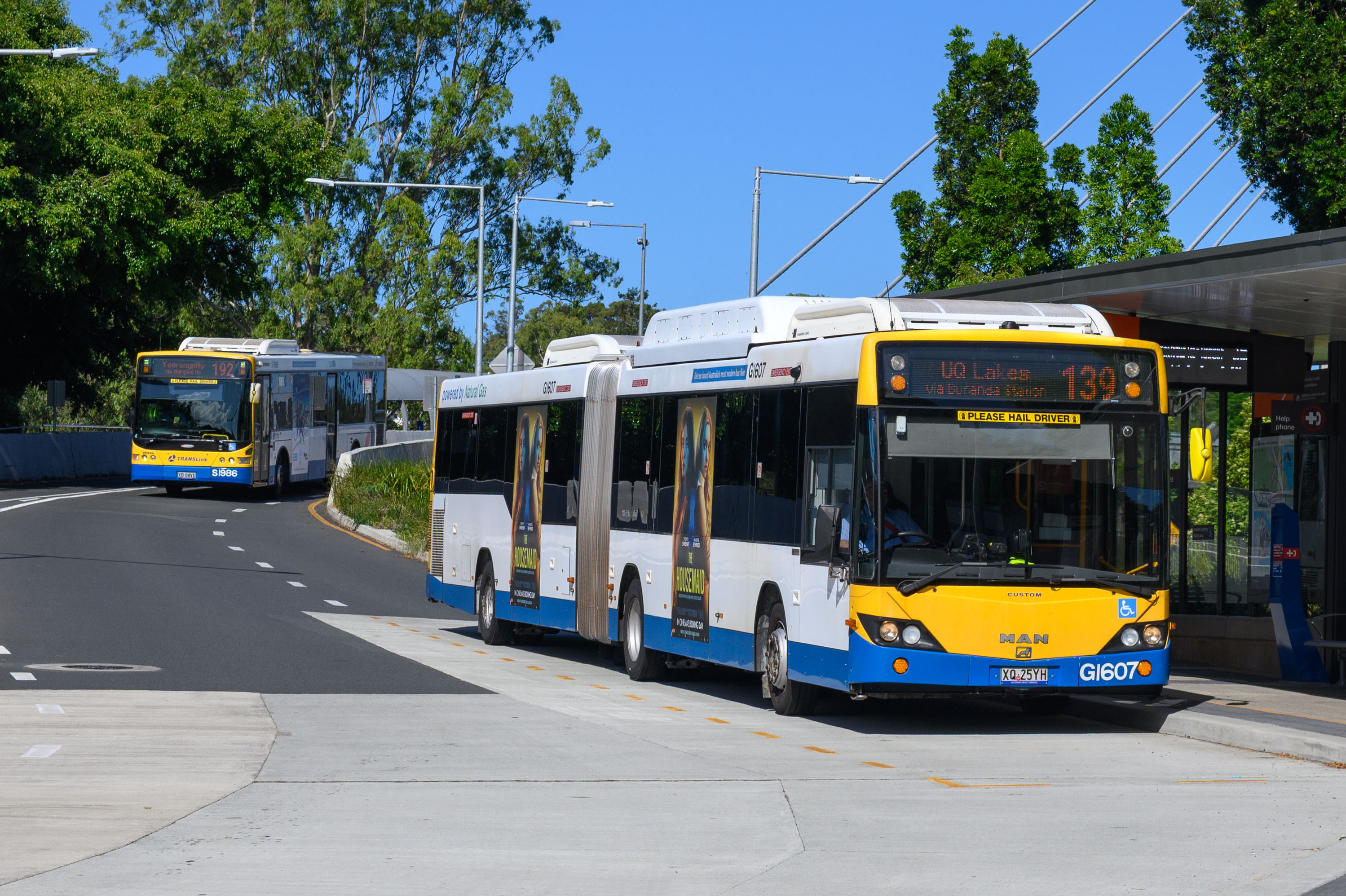
Brisbane Transport MAN 28.310 with Custom Coaches CB60 Evo II body and Volvo B7RLE with Volgren CR228L body at UQ Lakes

Public bus services in Queensland are coordinated by the Queensland Government's Department of Transport and Main Roads. The vast majority of bus services in Queensland are coordinated by the Translink division of the Department, who manage timetabling and ticketing systems, and contract operations to over 1000 private service operators around the state.

== History ==
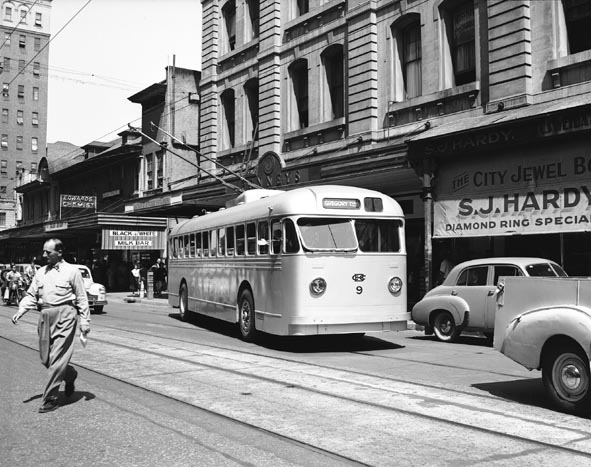
A trolleybus in Edward Street shortly after the service commenced in 1951.

Historically, Brisbane operated a network of trolleybuses and trams which were closed in 1969 in favour of an increased bus fleet for Brisbane.

== Urban services ==
=== South-East Queensland ===
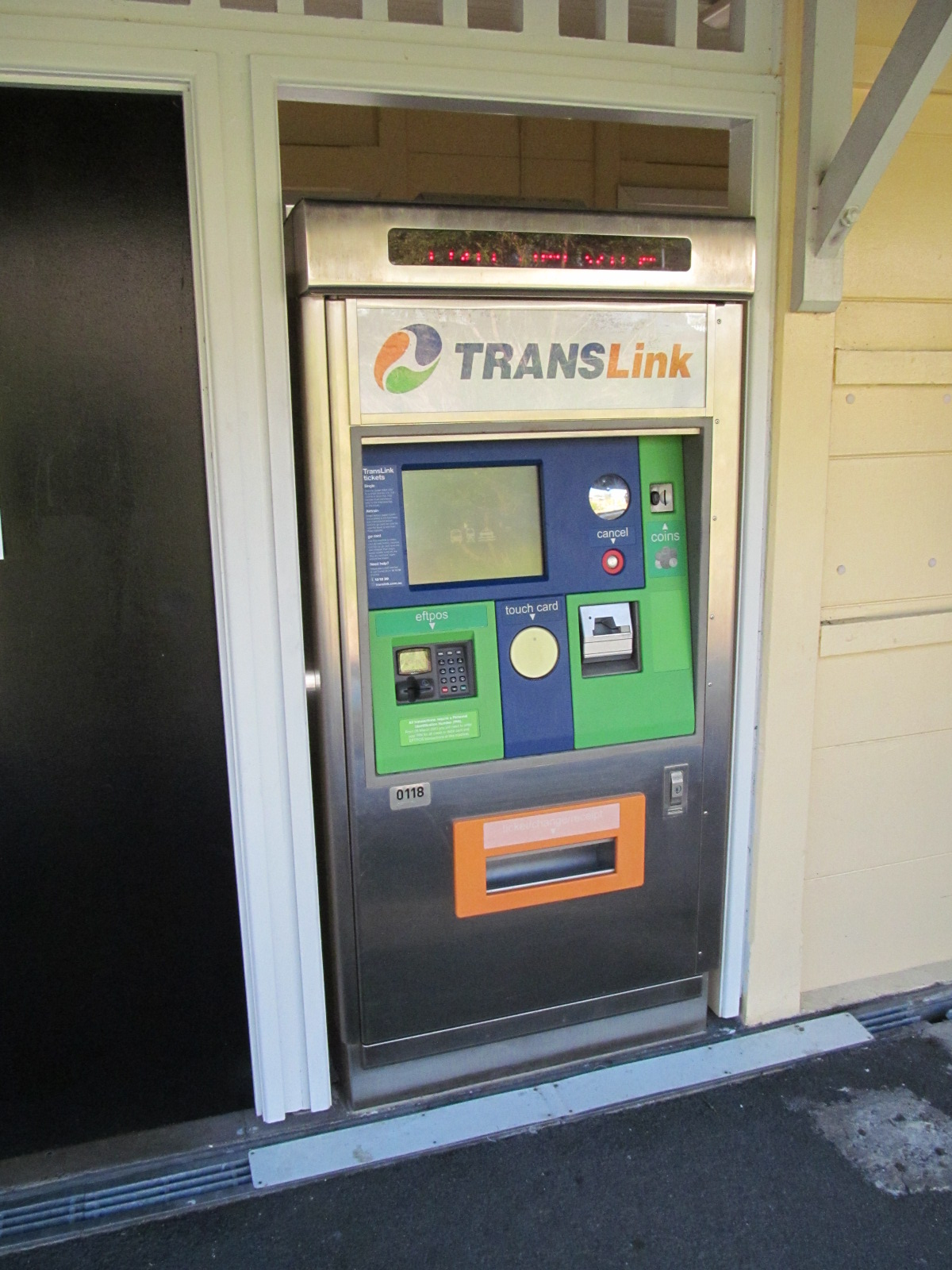
go card top-up machine

Translink is the division of the Department of Transport and Main Roads that coordinates the provision all public bus services and some school bus services across South East Queensland. Operation of these bus services are contracted to the Brisbane City Council within the bounds of that local government area, and various private operators in the rest of South-East Queensland. Services are pursuant to Translink's timetabling and integrated ticketing system, including the go card.

Translink also oversees Queensland Rail suburban trains and RiverCity Ferries on the Brisbane River to enable an integrated public transport system for the region.

=== Regional Queensland ===
As of April 2023, nearly all qconnect services have been transferred to Translink. qconnect was established an agency of the Queensland Transport in December 2007 as a regional counterpart to Translink, in order to bring coordination of public urban buses, regional air routes, and long-distance coaches throughout regional Queensland under the same banner. The bus networks of large regional towns, such as Warwick and Cairns, were formerly managed by qconnect. The only network still managed by qconnect as of July 2025 is North Stradbroke Island. As of 1 December 2025, the qconnect brand was dissolved and all services are managed by Translink.

School bus routes not falling under the administration of qconnect regional and rural Queensland are managed directly by the Department of Transport and Main Roads, and delivered by over 700 local providers.

== Long-distance services ==
Icon to used by qconnect and Translink to represent coach services

The Department of Transport and Main Roads issues contracts for long-distance and intercity coach services throughout regional Queensland. When a public passenger service area is declared, only public services contracted by the Department may operate. These operations were formerly managed by qconnect, but are now under the administration of the Translink division; though they do not carry any Translink branding, unlike urban bus networks. Also, they are not included in the Translink Journey Planner, unlike in NSW and other states.

Unlike other Australian public coach networks, such as NSW TrainLink and V/Line, Queensland's coach network has no central brand identity. Timetables are published by the service operator, and ticketing is managed by the service operator. There are also a number of public coach routes that are not managed by Translink. These include interstate public coach services operated by Transport for New South Wales, and scheduled railbuses connecting to Queensland Rail's regional train services.

Queensland public coaches and railbus routes as of 10 December 2021
Network	Operator	Routes
Department of TMR (administered by Translink)	Greyhound Australia	Brisbane to Charleville and Mount Isa; Rockhampton to Emerald and Longreach; Rockhampton to Miles; Townsville to Mount Isa and Tennant Creek
Department of TMR (administered by Translink)	Murrays Coaches	Brisbane to St George (via Moonie Highway) and Cunnamulla; Brisbane to St George (via Gore Highway) and Lightning Ridge
Department of TMR (administered by Translink)	Trans North Bus & Coach	Cairns to Cooktown (via Mulligan Highway); Cairns to Cooktown (via Cape Tribulation Road); Cairns to Karumba; Townsville to Charters Towers; Bowen to Collinsville
Department of TMR (administered by Translink)	Mackay Transit Coaches	Emerald to Mackay
Department of TMR (administered by Translink)	North Burnett Regional Council	Mundubbera to Bundaberg (via Ceratodus); Mundubbera to Bundaberg (via Childers); Mundubbera to Maryborough; Ceratodus to Monto
NSW TrainLink	Sunstate Coaches	Casino to Brisbane; Casino to Robina; Casino to Surfers Paradise
Queensland Rail Travel	Queensland Rail Travel	Maryborough West to Maryborough and Hervey Bay; Gympie North to Gympie town
Queensland Rail Travel	Whitsunday Transit	Proserpine to Airlie Beach
Queensland Rail Travel	Bowen Taxis	Bowen railway station to Bowen town
Queensland Rail Travel	Eckel Bus Service	Charleville to Cunnamulla; Charleville to Quilpie
Queensland Rail Travel	Outback Aussie Tours	Longreach to Winton

Beyond those services listed above, operators such as Greyhound, Murrays, and Premier also operate private coach services within Queensland and to interstate destinations, including Sydney. These private services operate where a declared service area has not been deemed by the Department of Transport and Main Roads. Despite this, the Department has assisted coordinate transport planning with private service operators, and attempted to introduce a uniform route numbering system.

In July 2025, FlixBus announced their intention to enter the Australian market. They are expected to begin operation of coach routes connecting Brisbane, Sydney, and Melbourne by Summer 2025/26.

== Infrastructure ==
=== Busways ===
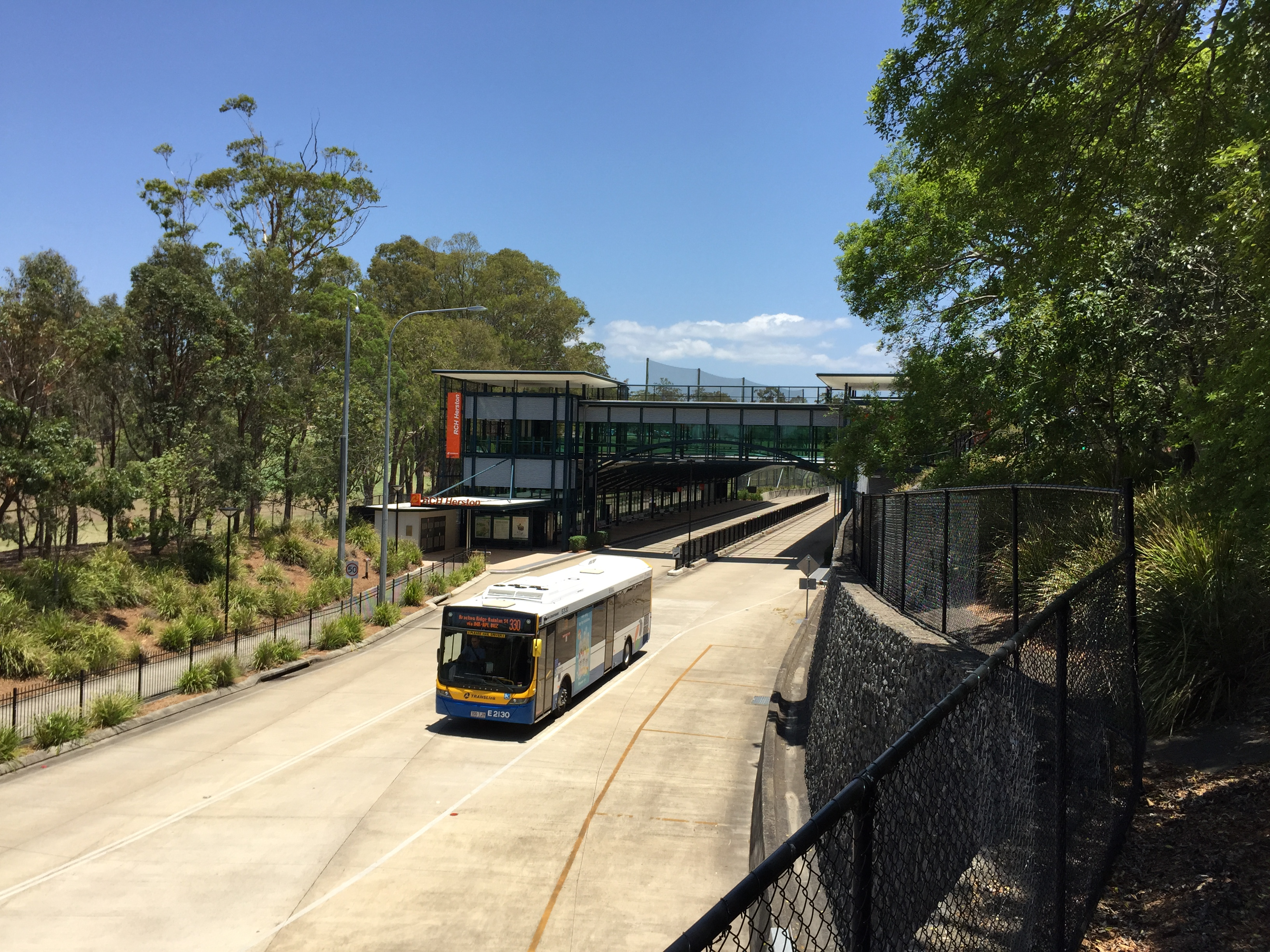
Northern Busway, Brisbane, 2014

In Brisbane, a 25 km network of busways has been constructed to allow public transport buses to bypass traffic congestion whilst providing interconnectivity with the Queensland Rail network. Dedicated bus lanes and general high-occupancy vehicle lanes (transit lanes) can be found throughout the state, giving buses a further mechanism to bypass traffic congestion, albeit in a slower (but cheaper) way as those lanes are rarely grade separated.

=== Bus stops ===
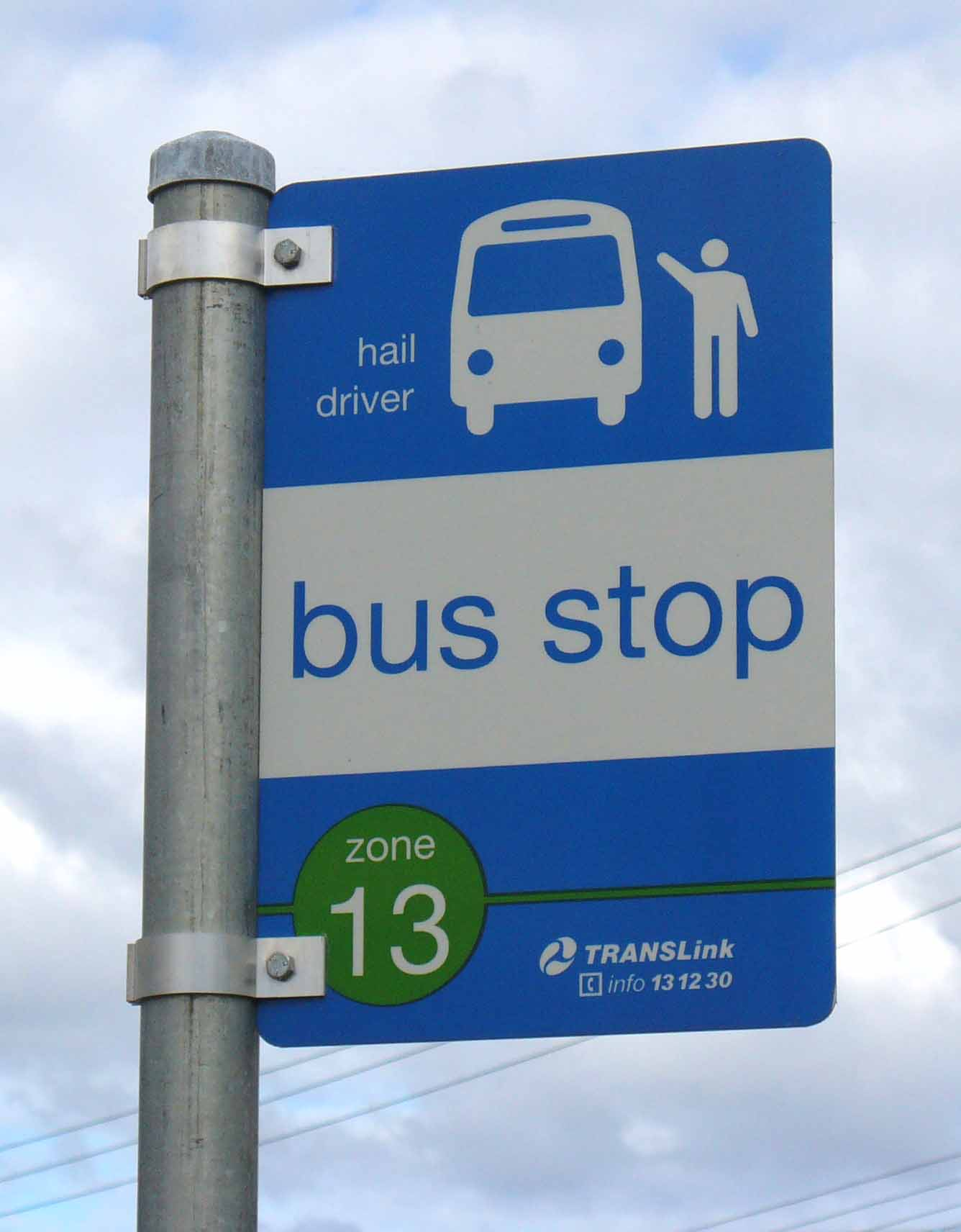
A 'flag pole' sign used at regular bus stops. The sign contains zone information and Translink's phone number.

Bus stops are designated places where buses stop for passengers to board or leave a bus. There are four bus stop types which are used throughout Queensland. The type of bus stop used depends on the number of passengers that will use the bus stop. These bus stop types include regular, intermediate, premium and signature. 'Regular' bus stops are used for low frequency bus services with low passenger volumes and are located in outer suburban or non-urban areas. 'Intermediate' bus stops are used by moderate frequency bus services with moderate passenger volumes and are located in suburban areas. 'Premium' bus stops are serviced by high frequency bus services with moderate to high passenger volumes and are located at major attractions (e.g. shopping centres). Premium bus stops may be located near bus priority measures such as bus queue jumps, bus lanes or transit lanes. 'Signature' bus stops are located on busways, interchanges and streets in Brisbane CBD. The bus stop is used by high frequency bus services with moderate to high passenger volumes. These bus stops have adequate space for indented or off-road bus bays and standing room for three or more buses.

Located on every bus stop is signage called the 'bus stop marker' which is used to indicate where the front door of the bus is located while the bus is at the stop. There are three types of signages: Regular bus stops uses the 'flag pole'; Intermediate bus stops uses the 'j-pole'; both Premium and Signature bus stops use the 'blade'.

== See also ==
- Rail transport in South East Queensland
- Transport in Brisbane
