= MTC =

MTC may refer to:

== Organizations ==
=== Education ===
- Mandarin Training Center, in Taiwan
- Manila Tytana Colleges, in Pasay, Philippines
- Marion Technical College, in Marion, Ohio
- Mastery Transcript Consortium
- Missionary Training Center
- Mississippi Teacher Corps

=== Entertainment ===
- Manhattan Theatre Club
- Manitoba Theatre Centre
- Melbourne Theatre Company, in Australia

=== Telecommunications ===
- Mobile Telecommunications Company
- Mobile Telecommunications Limited, Namibia
- Mongolia Telecom Company
- MTS (telecommunications), Russian mobile network operator Мобильные ТелеСистемы, branded as MTC in Cyrillic

=== Transport ===
- Mechanised Transport Corps, a British women's civilian organization that provided drivers for government departments
- Metropolitan Transport Corporation (Chennai), operates the public bus service in Chennai, India
- Metropolitan Transportation Commission (San Francisco Bay Area)
- Ministry of Transport and Communications (Venezuela)
- Mitcham Eastfields railway station, London, by National Rail station code
- Montreal Transit Corporation
- Metro Transit (Minnesota), Minneapolis–Saint Paul, formerly Metropolitan Transit Commission
- Mackay Transit Coaches, operates Public Transport in the city of Mackay, Queensland

=== Other organizations ===
- Management and Training Corporation, manages private prisons and U.S. Job Corps centers
- Morgan Technical Ceramics
- Multistate Tax Commission, a U.S. intergovernmental state tax agency
- Međimurska trikotaža Čakovec, a Croatian knitwear company

== Other uses ==
- Coordinated Mars Time, a proposed Mars analog to Universal Time
- MIDI timecode
- Mill test report (metals industry)
- Medullary thyroid cancer
- Metropolitan Transition Center, a prison in Baltimore, Maryland
- McLaren Technology Centre, headquarters of McLaren
- "MTC", a song by S3RL, 2012
- The Memory Test Computer built as part of Project Whirlwind
- Modular tensor category, an algebraic structure appearing in mathematical physics
- Meerut City railway station, by station code
- Major trauma centre, a type of specialist unit in the United Kingdom
- Merkle tree certificate

== See also ==
- Metropolitan Transit Commission (disambiguation)
