= Emerald railway station =

Emerald railway station may refer to:

- Emerald railway station, Queensland, Australia, on the Central Western railway line
- Emerald railway station, Victoria, Australia, on the Puffing Billy Railway
- Emerald station, Metro Manila, Philippines, now Marikina–Pasig station, on LRT Line 2
