= Central Western railway line =

Railway line in Australia

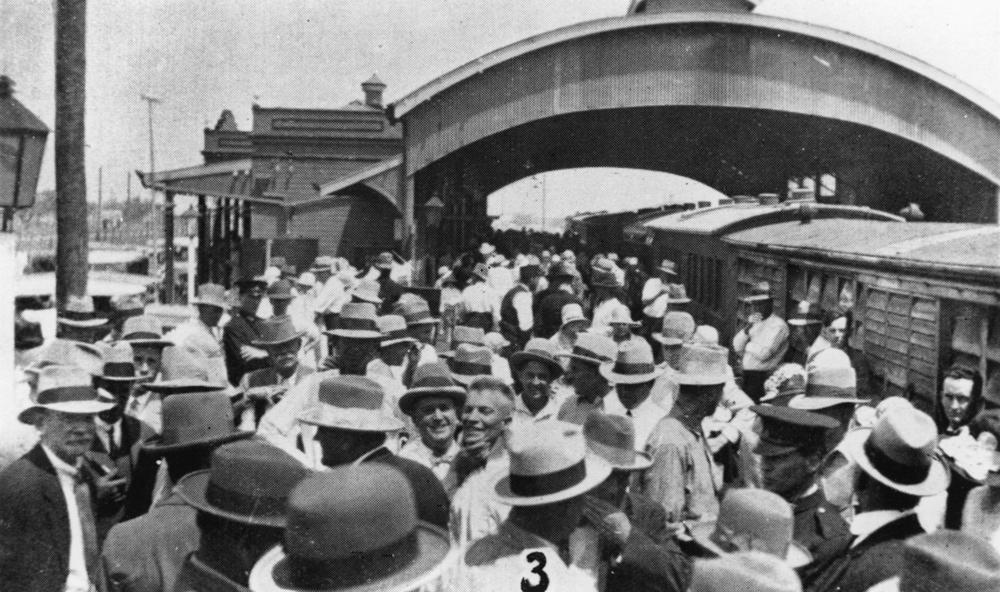
Celebration at Winton station for the opening of the line from Longreach, 1928

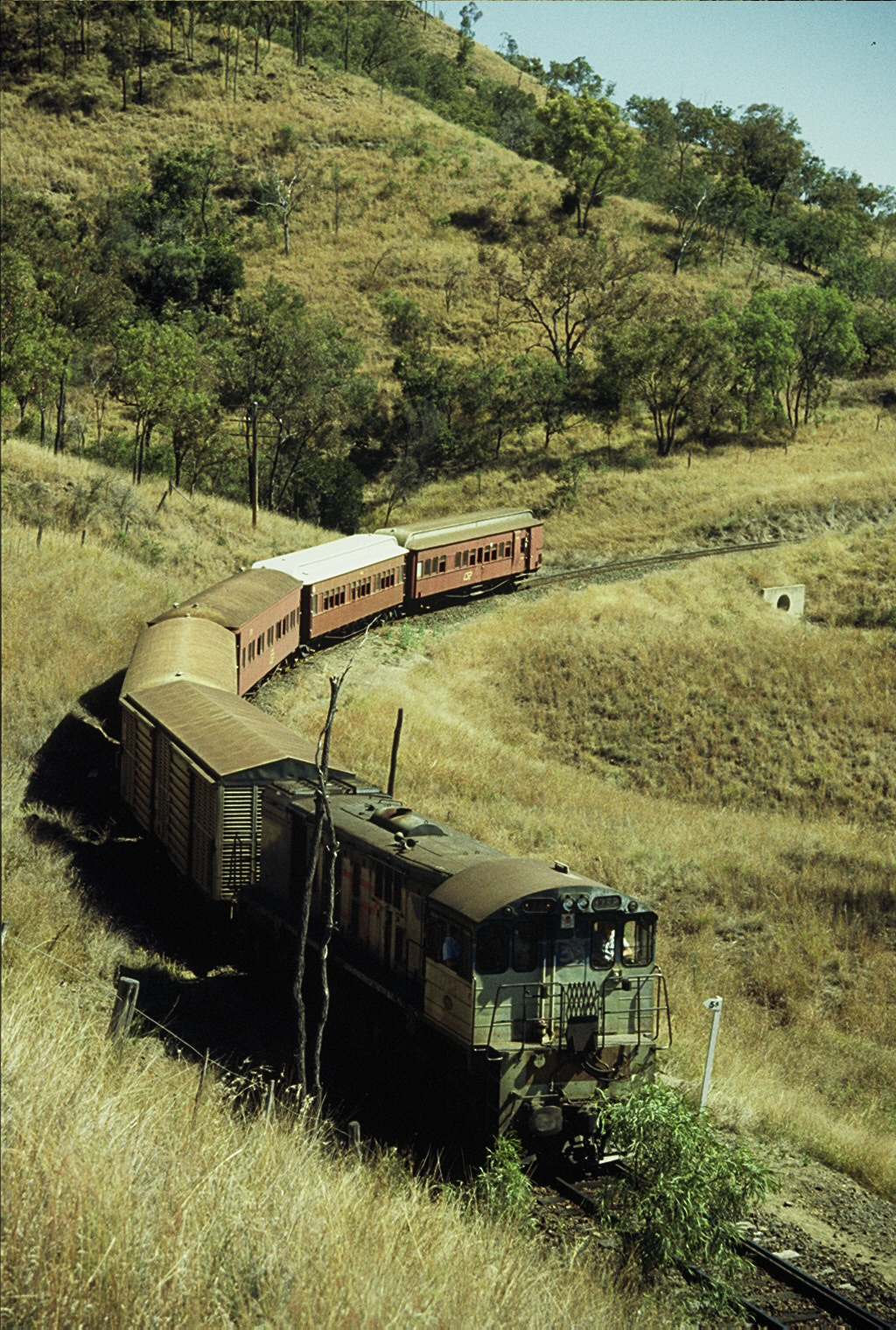
QR loco 1732 hauls a special train on the Drummond Range section, near Bogantungan, September 1989

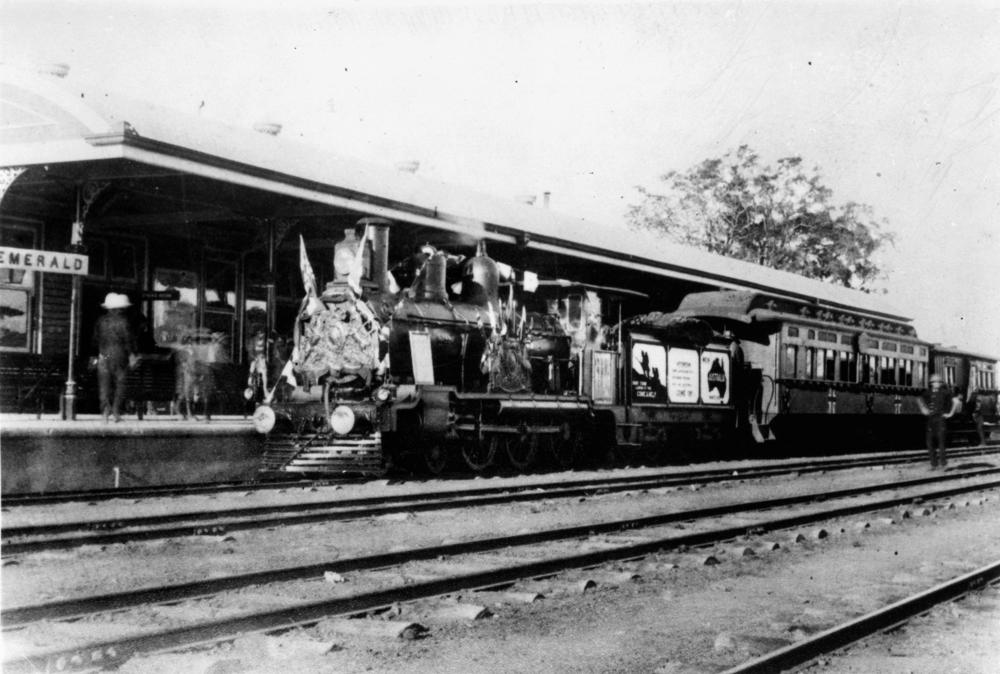
Recruiting train stopped at Emerald ~1916

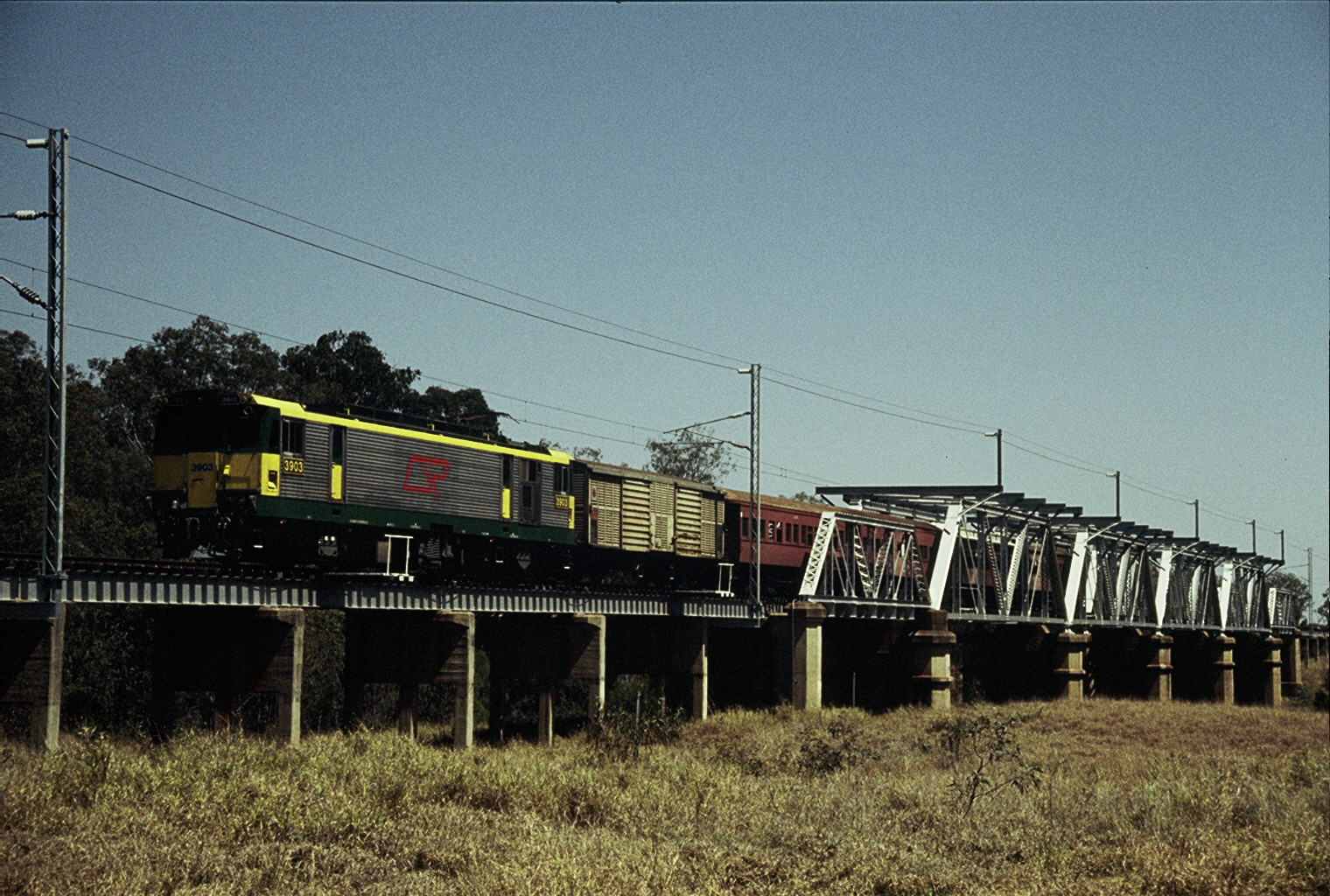
QR electric loco 3903 hauling a special train crosses the Nogoa River bridge, east of Emerald, September 1989

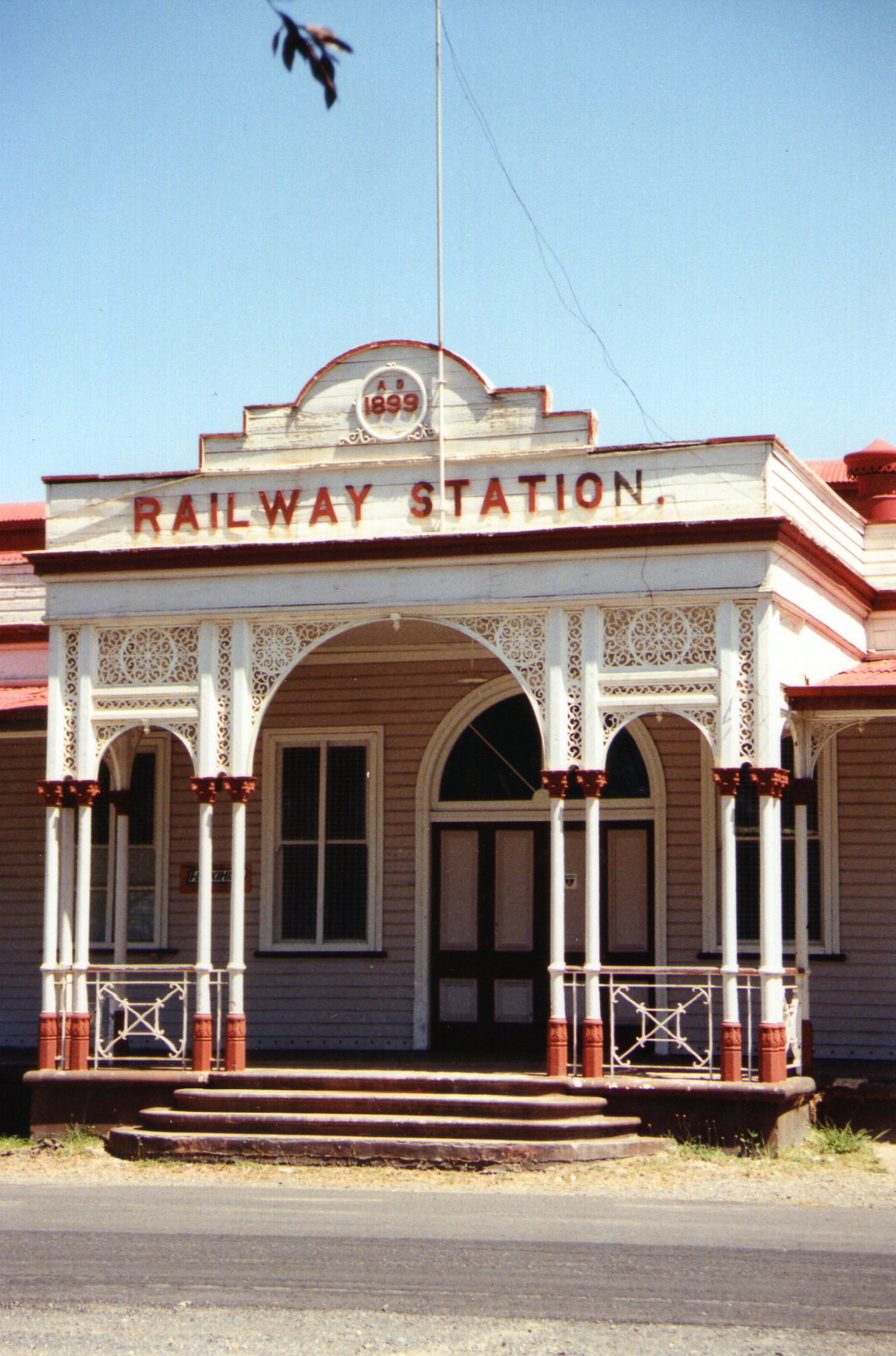
The ornate entrance to Emerald railway station

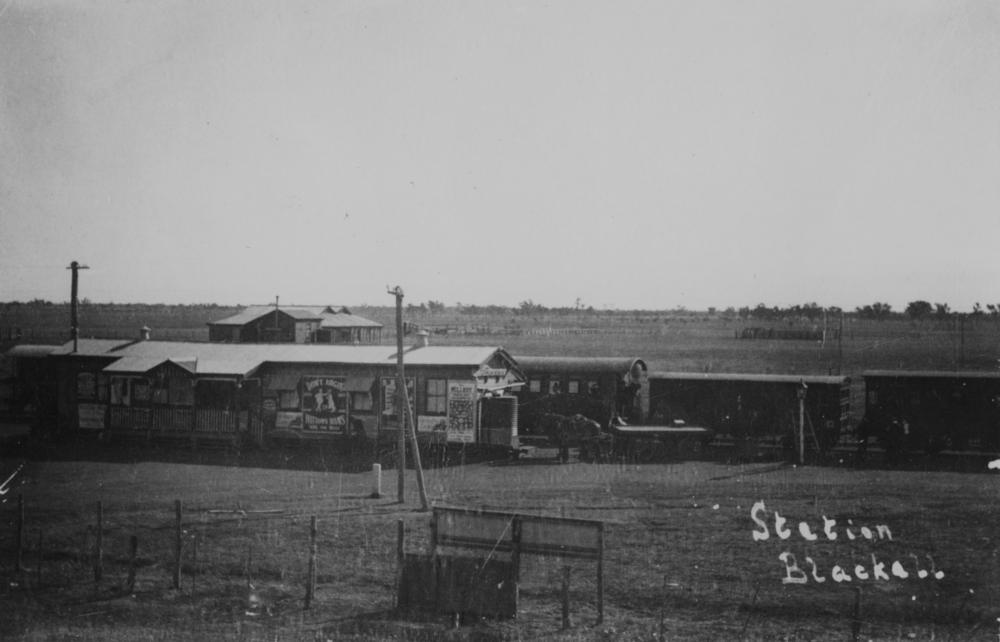
Blackall station, ~1910

The Central Western railway line is a railway line in Queensland, Australia. It was opened in a series of sections between 1867 and 1928. It commences at Rockhampton and extends west 863 kilometres (536 mi) to Winton.

== History ==
Following the separation of Queensland from the colony of New South Wales in 1859, Queensland consisted of a vast area with a population of approximately 30,000 people, most of who lived in the southeast corner of the colony. The new Queensland Government was keen to facilitate development and immigration, and had approved the construction of the Main Line from Ipswich, about 160 kilometres (99 mi) to the fertile Darling Downs region in 1864. This was the first narrow gauge (1,067 mm or 3 ft 6 in) main line in the world.

Following the establishment of the settlement of Rockhampton in 1858, and the discovery of gold at nearby Canoona in 1859, there were calls for improved land transportation in the region. Despite the goldrush being short-lived, it established Rockhampton as the main port for Central Queensland, and the Queensland Parliament approved the Central West line once the Main Line had proven the viability of the controversial narrow gauge.

The first section opened to Westwood, the place where the roads to Taroom, Springsure, Peak Downs and the central west diverged, 46 kilometres (29 mi) from Rockhampton, in September 1867. Freight being carried by bullock teams from further west found no advantage to transferring to rail for such a short distance, and so the government was forced to extend the line in sections from 1874, reaching Blackwater in 1877 and the Nogoa River in 1879, leading to the establishment of the town of Emerald.

Construction then proceeded west virtually tracking the Tropic of Capricorn, with settlements developing once the line was built. The line reached Alpha on 22 September 1884, Beta on 12 January 1885, Jericho on 8 June 1885, and Barcaldine on 8 November 1886, after crossing the Drummond Range using 1 in 33 (3.3%) grades and 4-chain (80 m) radius curves (the tightest used on the system) to avoid major earthworks, and reached Longreach in 1892.

The town of Winton became the terminal of the Great Northern line from Townsville in 1899, and became a major livestock loading point for the central western region. Linking Winton to the Central West line was seen as providing additional markets for the livestock, and the extension opened in September 1928.

=== Export coal traffic ===
Coal had been noted by the earliest explorers to the Central Queensland region, but domestic demand was met by relatively small local mines. In the 1950s major exploration programs identified large reserves of high quality coal, and a series of mines and associated railways have been developed since that time. The first line, to the Callide mine, was 14 kilometres (8.7 mi) connecting to the Callide Valley branch opened in 1953, with coal railed to Gladstone via Mount Morgan (the Abt rack section being bypassed in 1952) and Rockhampton. Further mines opened, increasing tonnage to the point where a new direct line to Gladstone was built, known as the Moura Short line, opened in 1968.

Other mines were developed in the Blackwater-Emerald region, with a series of lines built to enable the coal to be railed to Gladstone, known as the Blackwater system. The individual branch lines in this system are detailed in the Branch Lines section below. Coal is also railed to the Stanwell Power Station.

Coal tonnage railed to Gladstone steadily increased, requiring innovations such as multiple locomotives (up to 6 diesel-electrics and then 5 electric) distributed front and mid-train and controlled by radio (Locotrol) from the front locomotive, introduced in 1976. The length of the longest trains on the system is 1.7 km.

=== System upgrades ===
As a result of the growing traffic volumes, CTC signalling was introduced between Rockhampton and Blackwater in 1979–80. In November 1980 a new line from Gracemere to Rocklands (junction with the North Coast line) opened, enabling coal trains to bypass Rockhampton. The only tunnel on the system was 'daylighted' as part of an upgrade in 1983.

The system was electrified at 25 kV, 50 Hz in 1987, including the line as far as Emerald. For details of this project see Rail electrification in Queensland.

Duplication of the line has occurred in sections, listed from east to west below:

- Rocklands – Stanwell (18 km) opened 2014
- Westwood – Windah (10.3 km)
- Tunnel – Aroona (19.8 km)
- Duaringa – Wallaroo (11.1 km)
- Dingo – Bluff (24 km) opened 2015
- Bluff – Rangal (29 km) opened ~2011

Approximately 60% of the 199 km Rocklands – Rangal section is duplicated.

== Branch lines ==
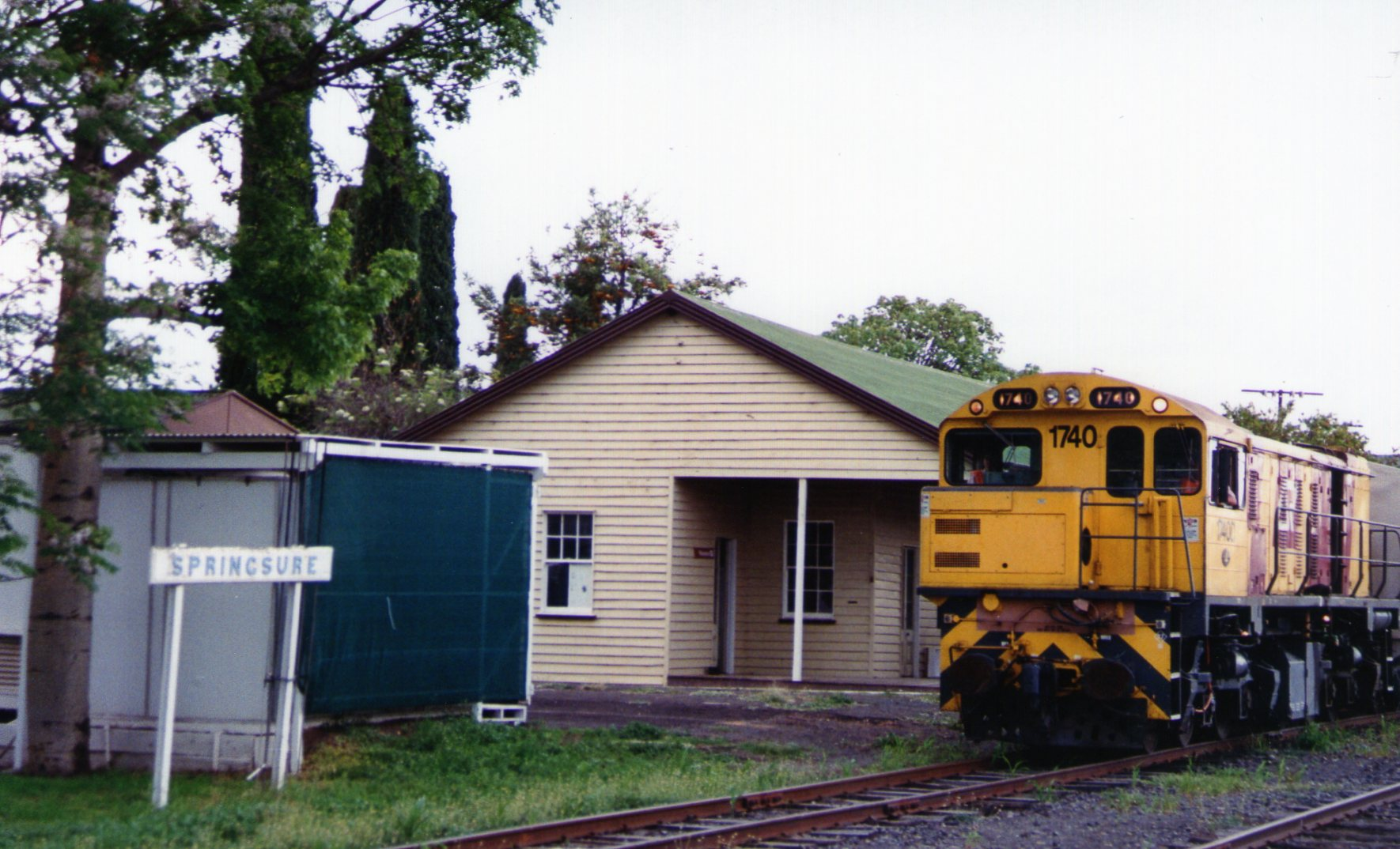
QR loco 1740 at Springsure Station, ~1991

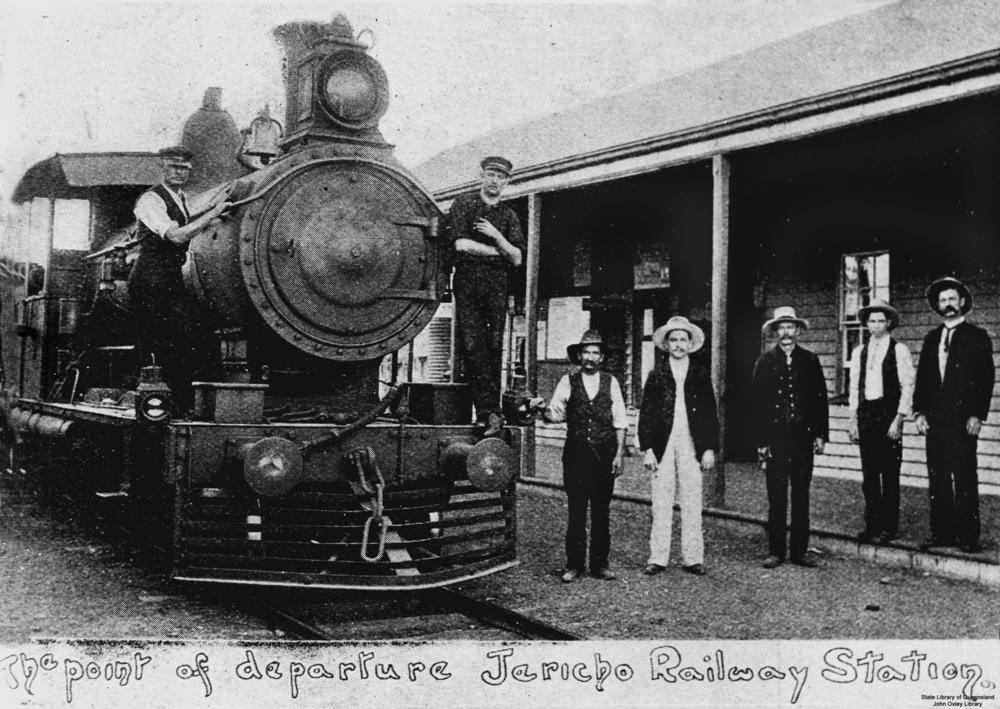
Jericho station, 1908

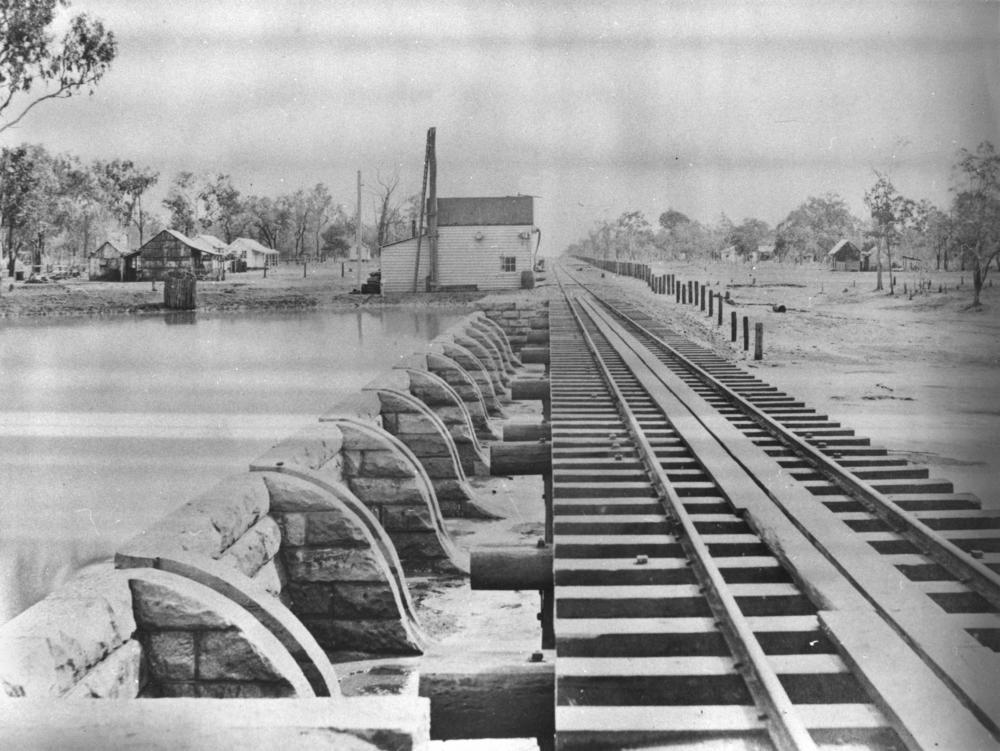
Weir at Dingo, 1878

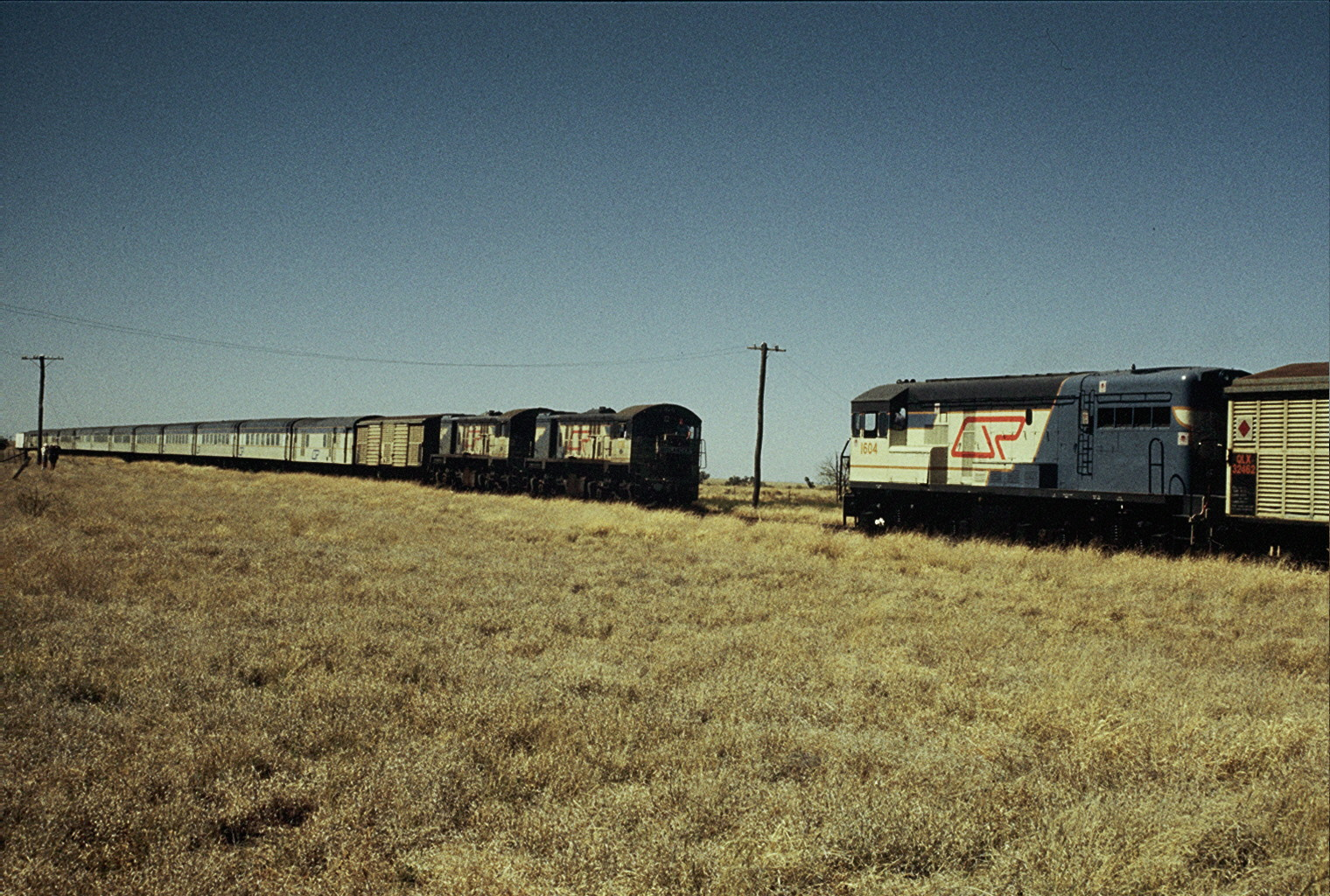
1604 crossing the westbound Midlander, September 1989

A series of traditional branch lines were built to connect to the Central West line, and these are listed from east to west below. The more recent lines to serve coal mines are listed separately below.

Kabra – Theodore and Lawgi (Dawson Valley line and Callide Valley line), opened in sections between 1898 and 1932, it included a 2.3 kilometres (1.4 mi) section of rack railway to Mt Morgan, which was replaced by a deviation in 1952. The last sections of this system closed on 26 June 2013.

Nogoa – Springsure, 65 kilometres (40 mi). This line opened on 15 August 1887 to provide access to a fertile valley. Although built to pioneer standards such as 10 tonne axle load, it has remained in service, with the first 43 km to Wurba Junction being upgraded in conjunction with the opening of a coal loading balloon loop serving the Minerva mine in 2006. The section beyond Wurba Junction was closed on 26 June 2013.

Emerald – Blair Athol, 118 kilometres (73 mi). This line was opened via Capella to Clermont (100 km) in 1884 to serve the developing Peak Downs copper mine. It was extended north to the Blair Athol coal mine in 1910, and a short extension was opened in 1912 to Birimgan to access a source of timber for sleepers in conjunction with the Great Western Railway proposal. The line was upgraded to 15 tonne axle load in 1979. A connection to the separate but proximate Blair Athol-Mackay line was opened in 1986, providing the Emerald district with rail access to the Mackay port, and closed on 26 June 2013.

Blair Athol had the first Rail ambulance in Queensland. Blair Athol coal, considered the best steaming coal in Queensland, was railed to Mount Isa via Winton and Hughenden in the 1960s, a distance of 1,510 km.

Jericho – Yaraka, 271 kilometres (168 mi). Opened to Blackall 114 kilometres (71 mi) in 1908, the line was extended as part of the Great Western Railway proposal between 1913 – 1917, with Yaraka becoming the terminus when construction halted due to difficulties in obtaining materials and labour due to the First World War. Intended to reach Windorah, construction never resumed. The line closed in 2005 with the rails being lifted that same year. Blackall had one of the last Rail ambulances in Queensland, withdrawn in 1990.

Aramac Tramway, 66 kilometres (41 mi). Aramac was one of the few existing settlements in the region when the Central West line was being constructed, but that line maintained its due west path and was built well south of the town. After unsuccessfully lobbying for the State to build a line, the Aramac Shire Council funded what was technically a tramway (but built to QR standards), providing the line to Barcaldine which opened in July 1913. The line was invaluable during wet weather, as the heavy clay 'black soil' became impassable for days after rain. Once an all-weather road was provided, the line was seen as a burden on rate payers and closed in 1975.

Winton – Springvale – Construction started on a line heading south west from Winton as part of the Great Western Railway proposal in 1912, and about 40 kilometres (25 mi) was built before work halted in 1917. Although construction resumed in 1920, it was again abandoned without ever being opened for traffic, and was dismantled as a work creation program in the 1930s depression.

== Contemporary coal lines ==
Rangal – Kinrola, 18.5 km, opened 1967

Blackwater – Laleham 41 km, opened 1970

Burngrove – Gregory 65 km, opened 1980. This line was connected to the Goonyella system in 1983. 2 spurs branch from this line, to Ensham (13.4 km) opened 1997 and Gordonstone (12.8 km), opened 1992.

Sagitarrius – Curragh 12 km, opened 1983

Kinrola – Rollestone (Bauhinia line), 107 km, opened 2005. This line was not electrified when built, with electrification commissioned in December 2014.

== Services ==
In 1892, the Central Western Mail train, with first class sleeping carriages and a travelling post office (TPO), departed Rockhampton three times each week at 10 p.m., arriving in Longreach at 5 p.m. the following day. Second class sleeping cars were introduced in 1896. The service was extended to Winton when the line was extended there in 1928. Sleeping cars were also provided to Clermont, Springsure and Blackall.

Foot-warmers were introduced in the first class compartments on trains departing Rockhampton in 1911, and provided each winter until 1958.

The first buffet car in Queensland operated between Emerald and Longreach commencing in 1912. The TPO was withdrawn in 1932 as an economic measure.

The air-conditioned Midlander was introduced on 4 May 1954. It was replaced by the Spirit of the Outback in November 1993, commencing from Brisbane and terminating at Longreach, Winton losing its passenger service from that time.

== See also ==
- Rail transport in Queensland
