= Metropolitan Transit Commission =

Metropolitan Transit/Transportation Commission/Corporation may refer to:

- Metropolitan Transportation Commission, San Francisco Bay Area, California
- Metropolitan Transport Corporation, Chennai, India
- Metro Transit, Minneapolis–Saint Paul, Minnesota, formerly Metropolitan Transit Commission

== See also ==
- San Francisco Municipal Transportation Agency
- Metro Transit (disambiguation)
- MTC (disambiguation)
- MTA (disambiguation)
