= Metro Transit Police =

Metro Transit Police may refer to:

- Metro Transit Police Department in Washington, D.C.
- Metropolitan Transit Police of Metro Transit in Minneapolis-St. Paul

== See also ==
- Metro Transit (disambiguation)
