= Metro Transit =

Metro Transit may refer to:

- King County Metro, formerly branded as "Metro Transit", serving King County, Washington and the Seattle metropolitan area
- Metro Transit (Halifax), rebranded as Halifax Transit, serving Halifax Regional Municipality, Nova Scotia
- Metro Transit (Kalamazoo), serving Kalamazoo, Michigan
- Metro Transit (Madison), serving Madison, Wisconsin
- Metro Transit (Minnesota), serving the Minneapolis-Saint Paul metropolitan area
- Metro Transit (Oklahoma City), rebranded as Embark, serving the Oklahoma City metropolitan area
- Metro Transit (Omaha), serving the Omaha, Nebraska metropolitan area
- Metro Transit (St. Louis), serving the St. Louis metropolitan area

== See also ==
- Metro (disambiguation)
- Metro Transit Police (disambiguation)
- Metropolitan Transit Commission (disambiguation)
