= Longreach railway station =

Longreach
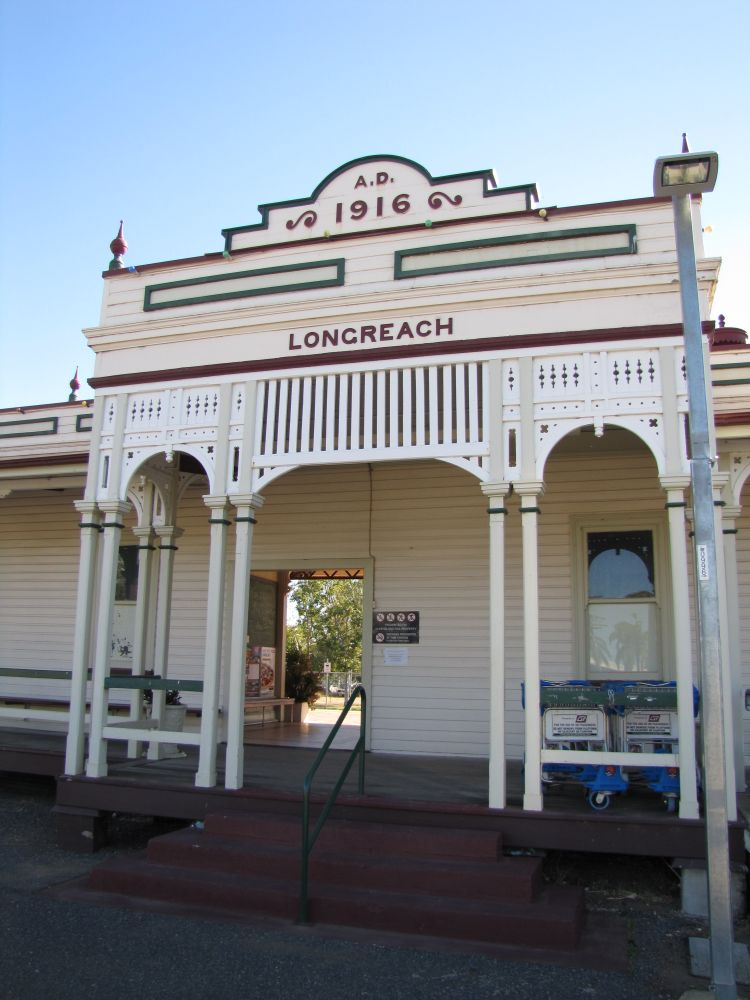
- Station entrance, 2013

General information
- Location: Landsborough Highway, Longreach
- Coordinates: 23.4401°S 144.2523°E
- Owner: Queensland Rail
- Operator: Traveltrain
- Line: Central Western
- Platforms: 1
- Tracks: 4

Construction
- Structure type: Ground
- Accessible: Yes

History
- Opened: February 1892
- Rebuilt: 1916
Location

Longreach railway station
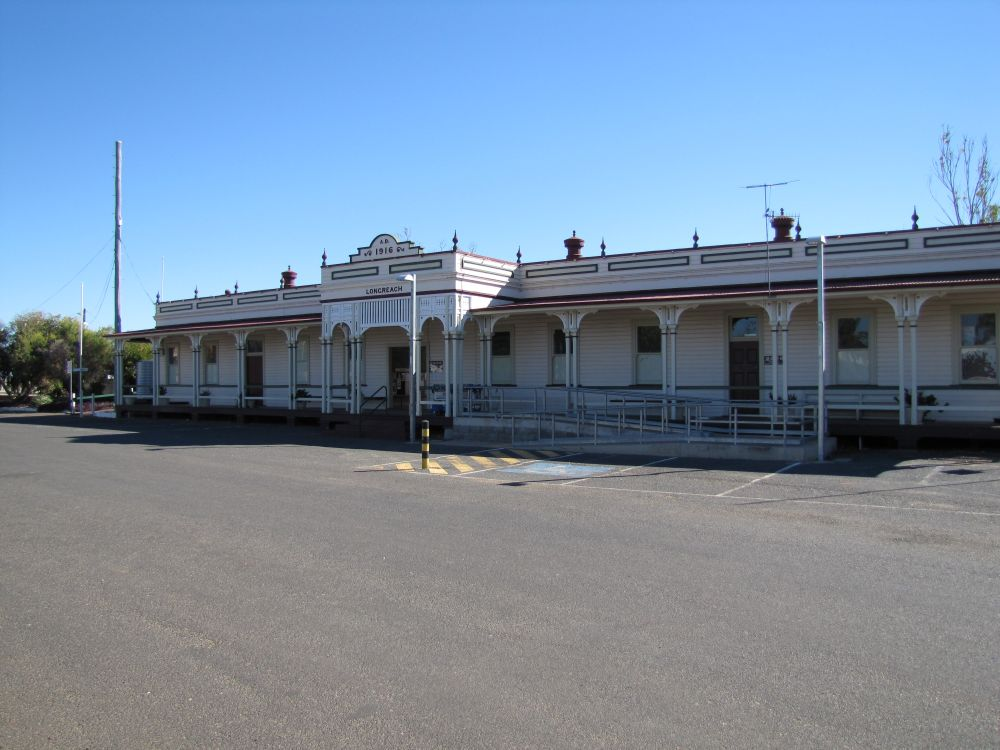
- Front of station, 2013

- Location within Queensland
- 23.4403°S 144.253°E
- Location: Landsborough Highway, Longreach, Longreach Region, Queensland, Australia

History
- Design period: 1870s–1890s (late 19th century)
- Built: 1887–1917

Queensland Heritage Register
- Official name: Longreach Railway Station
- Type: state heritage (landscape, built)
- Designated: 12 December 2005
- Reference no.: 601970
- Significant period: 1880s–1920s (historical); 1880s–ongoing (social)
- Significant components: ticket box/office, shed – goods, views to, platform canopies/awnings (railway), platform, views from, railway siding, shed/s, tank – water, furniture/fittings, tank stand, railway station, railway refreshment room/s

Longreach railway station is the terminus station of the Central Western line, serving the town of Longreach, Longreach Region, Queensland, Australia. It is on the Landsborough Highway. It was built from 1887 to 1917. It was added to the Queensland Heritage Register on 12 December 2005.

== Services ==
Longreach railway station is served by Traveltrain's Spirit of the Outback.

== History ==
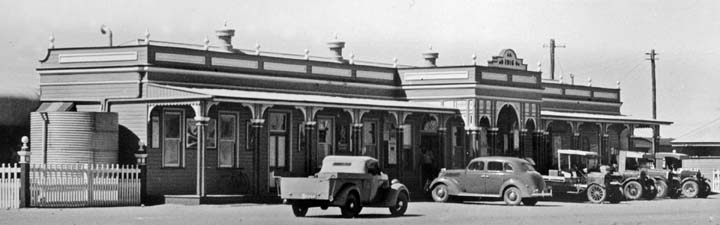
Front of station, 1938

Longreach Station opened in February 1892 as the interim terminus of the Central Western line when it was extended from Barcaldine. The line was later extended to Winton.

The present station building was completed in 1916.

The plan to build a railway in southern Queensland in 1863 prompted the residents of central Queensland to demand their own railway. The discovery of rich copper deposits at Peak Downs west of Rockhampton strengthened their case and in January 1864, Engineer for Roads, Northern Division, Henry Plews was ordered to survey a line to the copper field. Plews was made Chief Engineer of the northern railway in October 1864. The line opened as far as Westwood in September 1867.

This line was too short to be profitable and approval for an extension was granted in late 1872. Robert Ballard was appointed Chief Engineer and was given authority to let contracts for each section. The aim was to produce an affordable line.

As work progressed, towns developed at each temporary terminus. Some such as Pine Hill declined after the railway passed while others such as Alpha and Emerald continued to grow. Many buildings and businesses were shifted westwards from one terminus town to the next.

The line reached Duaringa in 1876, Blackwater in 1877 and Emerald in 1879. After Bogantungan (1881), the most difficult section was encountered – the crossing of the Drummond Range. The decision to extend the railway from Barcaldine (1886) to Longreach was the result of pressure being brought to bear by parliamentary representatives from Central Division and the fear that the northern Separation Movement could succeed. The final section was completed to Longreach in February 1892.

The Longreach site was selected by railways surveyors due to the presence of a large waterhole on the Thomson River. It was a popular stop for teamsters but it had never developed into a hotel or small community. Longreach was gazetted as a township in November 1887, and the first land sales occurred soon after that.

At the time the extension was completed, the bitterness of the Shearers' Strike was affecting the town and Premier Sir Samuel Griffith was rebuffed when he arrived to try to officially open the line.

When the line was completed, there were no railway buildings at the terminus, although a small post and telegraph office had been built to service the telegraph line which had advanced beside the railway. The first station building was a small timber shelter shed and office, 60 by 14 feet (18.3 m × 4.3 m).

The opening of the railway from Barcaldine to Longreach caused a building and population boom in the area. By 1914, Longreach had 14 hotels.

In 1912 Commissioner Evans promised a deputation of locals that he would ask the government to build a station at Longreach similar to that at Winton. QR at this stage was undergoing a major reinvestment and rebuilding program of railway lines, branch lines, carriages, locomotives, and buildings. The new station was begun in 1915–16. This would indicate something of the political influence of central Queensland, in that a new building was provided even though the existing building remained intact. The new station was completed in 1916–17.

The current timber station was completed in 1916 to a design attributed to Henrik Hansen, this date appearing on the pediment. It is similar to stations he designed at Emerald, Mount Morgan and Archer Park. The most obvious difference is the platform awnings: Archer Park and Mount Morgan have carriage shades with a curved roof; Emerald re-used the platform shade from Central Station, and Longreach has a cantilevered platform shade.

The refreshment room was built shortly afterwards. It has now closed and the building is used as offices.

The goods shed (still being used by Aurizon) is thought to have been built in 1892 and was substantially renovated in 1988. Longreach is a focus for heritage tourism for Queensland Rail, being the terminus for Queensland Rail's "Spirit of the Outback" rail adventure, offering what is promoted as a "unique insight into the history and culture of early Australia".

== Description ==
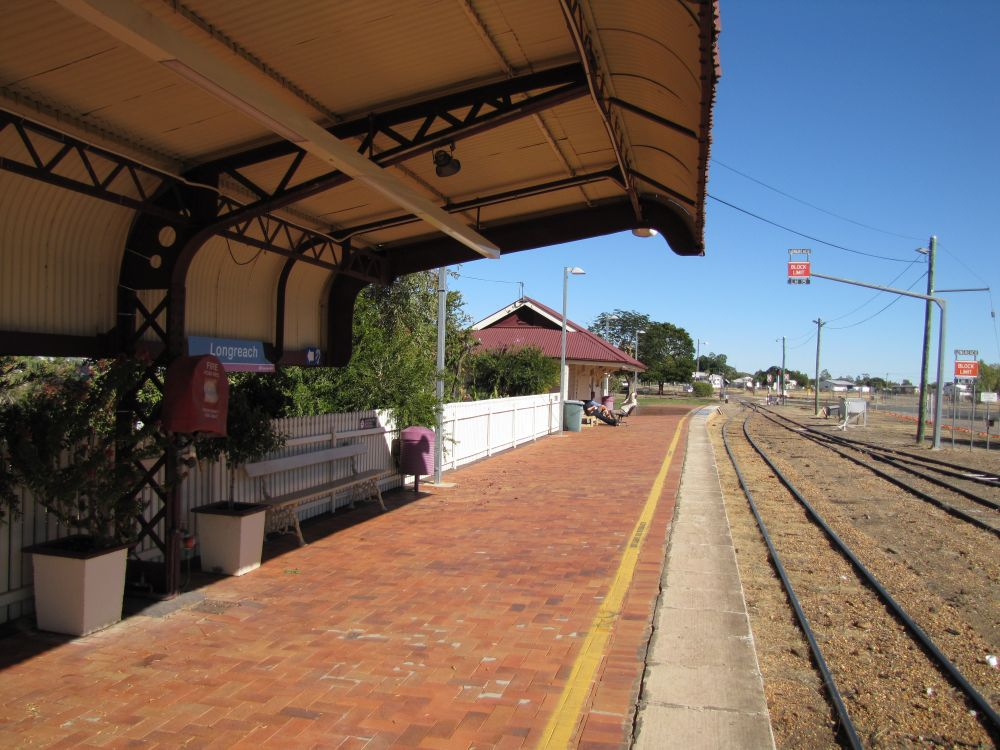
Platform, 2013

The station complex has a prominent location on the Landsborough Highway at the northern end of the main commercial precinct. It is opposite parkland with mature trees and a memorial.

=== Passenger Station ===
The Passenger Station building is a substantial and stylistic timber passenger station of the early twentieth century, demonstrating an Edwardian influence in style and decoration including central portico with parapet and pediment. The building is located on concrete stumps with timber floor throughout.

On the northern side of the building is the cantilevered steel framed platform awning with bull-nose front edge. Two timber sash windows are located along the northern side of the building.

The building has an imposing open front verandah with paired timber posts, capitals and brackets with a hipped main roof with a parapet surmounted by turned finials. The date AD 1916 appears on the pediment. The roof is clad with corrugated galvanised iron with original metal ventilators intact.

There are some internal tongue and groove VJ walls still exposed. The ladies waiting room has been fitted out with toilet facilities. A bench seat remains in the waiting room.

Original ticket windows survive in the western end of the building. The windows have been fitted with security grills. A bench seat remains in this central walkway section.

Internally, some suspended exposed grid drop-in ceilings have been installed and new tiling has been laid in the entrance ticket hallway. Corrugated galvanised iron tanks are located at the western and eastern ends of the building.

=== Refreshment Room ===
The Refreshment Room is a single storey timber building, clad with weatherboards, with a half-gable roof clad with corrugated galvanised iron. The roof projects on the northern (track side) with additional diagonal strut supports. The eastern and western ends has timber posts supporting verandah roof.

One original colonial sash window and double tongue and groove VJ doors are located in the eastern side of the building.

Internally, the building is lined with tongue and groove VJ boards throughout. A stove recess, with numerous metal flues, is located in the western wall. A roller door to a loading dock is located on the southern wall.

A tank and tank stand is located at the western end of the building.

=== Goods Shed ===
The Goods Shed (currently being used by Aurizon) is a large timber and steel framed shed with gable ends, with recent colorbond cladding. Steel columns are located to the northern side, elsewhere the frame is timber. The roof trusses are composite timber and steel with steel rods as tension members.

A single track enters the shed at the western and eastern ends through new hinged double gates clad with colorbond. A new concrete floor has replaced the original timber floor. Original offices at each end have also been removed. Two new roller shutter doors are located in the southern and western sides.

Timber struts to a projecting roof forming an awning are located over a former loading platform, southern wall. A quad gutter is located to the southern side and an ogee gutter to the northern side of the building.

A new office (currently utilized by Aurizon) with recent aluminum framed windows has been installed in the south-west corner.

A corrugated galvanised iron tank on a steel stand is located near the shed.

=== Male Toilet ===
A freestanding male toilet block is at the east end of station, with pyramid roof, part chamferboard wall cladding and glass louvre windows.

== Heritage listing ==
Longreach Railway Station was listed on the Queensland Heritage Register on 12 December 2005 having satisfied the following criteria.

The place is important in demonstrating the evolution or pattern of Queensland's history.

The station helps to demonstrate the pattern of Queensland history as Longreach is one of the largest of the many towns which developed as the result of railway construction. Longreach remained the terminus of the Central Line from 1892 until an extension was built to Winton to connect with the Great Northern Line in 1928 and it has been significant as a centre of railway operations up to the present day.

The place demonstrates rare, uncommon or endangered aspects of Queensland's cultural heritage.

The refreshment room is a rare surviving example of a free-standing timber refreshment room.

The place is important in demonstrating the principal characteristics of a particular class of cultural places.

Longreach Railway Station demonstrates many of the principal characteristics of a late 19th-century railway complex design. The passenger station, platform, refreshment room, goods shed and other ancillary buildings are significant for their contribution to an understanding of how the complex functioned.

The passenger station is associated with the office of railway designer Henrik Hansen and compares with similarly designed stations at Archer Park, Emerald and Mount Morgan.

The place is important because of its aesthetic significance.

The passenger station, platform awning and refreshment room exhibit aesthetic characteristics valued by the community as finely detailed and well-executed examples of railway buildings. They make a substantial contribution to the townscape at the junction of the Landsborough Highway with the main street of Longreach and form part of an important urban precinct including parkland and a memorial.
