= Mill test report =

Quality certification for metal products

A mill test report (MTR) and often also called a certified mill test report, certified material test report, mill test certificate (MTC), inspection certificate, certificate of test, or a host of other names, is a quality assurance document used in the metals industry that certifies a material's chemical and physical properties and states a product made of metal (steel, aluminum, brass or other alloys) complies with an international standards organization (such as ANSI, ASME, etc.) specific standards.

Mill here refers to an industry which manufactures and processes raw materials.

== Steel ==
An MTC provides traceability and assurance to the end user about the quality of the steel used and the process used to produce it.

Typically a European MTC will be produced to EN 10204. High quality steels for pressure vessel of structural purposes will be declared to 2.1 or 2.2 or certificated to 3.1 or 3.2. (EDIT: type is declared not by chapter in the document, but by type name, so edited the numbering)

The MTC will specify the type of certificate, the grade of steel and any addenda. It will also specify the results of chemical and physical examination to allow the purchaser or end user to compare the plate to the requirements of the relevant standards.

=== What is MTC for steel? ===
In steel industry There are mainly two types of MTC in steel industry, as for steel plates or steel pipes, there must be specific inspection scope or lists:

1. MTC EN 10204 3.1 :MTC 3.1 is issued by the manufacturer in which they declare that the products supplied are in compliance with the requirements of the order and in which they supply test results. This is the most common MTC in steel industry, when there is no extra requirement of customer for TPI inspection and witness of production and inspection of tests.
2. MTC EN 10204 3.2 :MTC 3.2 refers to the report prepared by both the manufacturer's authorized inspection representative, independent of the manufacturing department and either the purchaser's authorized inspection representative or the inspector designated by the official regulations and in which they declare that the products supplied are in compliance with the requirements of the order and in which test results are supplied.
