= Mackay Transit Coaches =

Mackay Transit

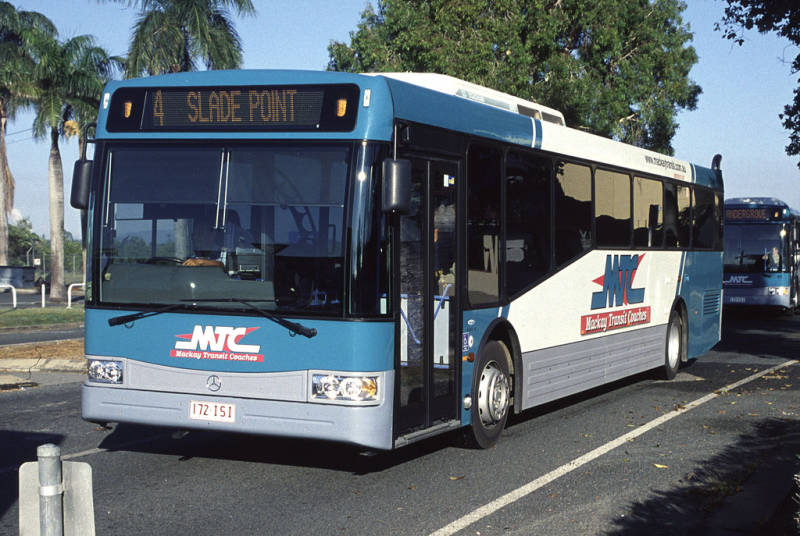
- Bustech bodied Mercedes-Benz OC500LE
- Parent: Kinetic
- Founded: 1991
- Defunct: 2023
- Service area: Mackay
- Service type: Bus operator
- Depots: Paget, Queensland
- Fleet: 62 (May 2022)
- Website: www.mackaytransit.com.au

Mackay Transit was a bus operator in the Australian state of Queensland. It operated in the Mackay region under contract to the Queensland Government to operate urban and school bus services utilising the Translink banner. As of 2023, Mackay Transit has changed its name and branding as part of a business re-brand by the parent company, Kinetic. Mackay Transit has now been dissolved into the Kinetic Group with its fleet of buses reflecting this change.

== History ==
In May 2022, Mackay Transit was acquired by Kinetic, an Australian-based multinational bus operator.

In late 2023, Mackay Transit was officially branded as Kinetic, with all new advertising now showing the Kinetic Brand. All new buses will display the Kinetic logo with the current logo and branding of Mackay Transit Coaches slowly being updated to reflect the new brand name.

== Services ==
Since 2016, Mackay Transit was the contracted operator of all urban bus services in Mackay under the Translink banner. Previously, the company had been contracted to operate QConnect services until 2016.

Mackay Transit was the major school bus operator in the Mackay region, servicing schools within the city and outer suburbs.

Mackay Transit also operated many long-distance services such as the Mackay-Emerald coach service. The company was also a major charter bus operator in Mackay and the Coalfields for schools, mining and general purposes.
