= Emerald railway station, Queensland =

Emerald
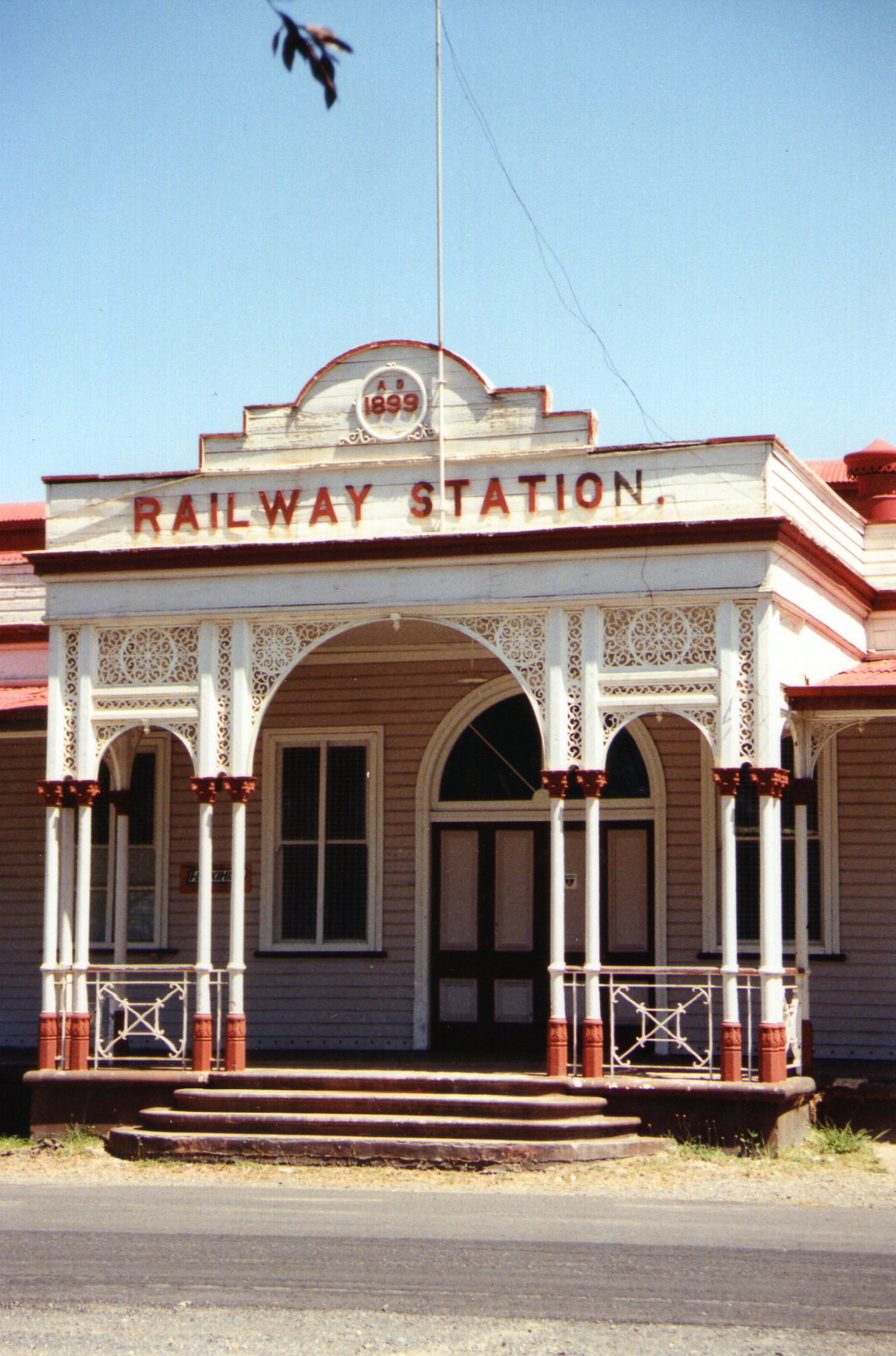
- The ornate entrance to Emerald railway station, 2014

General information
- Location: Capricorn Highway/Gregory Highway, Emerald
- Coordinates: 23.5266°S 148.1638°E
- Owner: Queensland Rail
- Operator: Traveltrain
- Lines: Central Western; Clermont; Springsure
- Platforms: 1
- Tracks: 2

Construction
- Structure type: Ground
- Accessible: Yes

History
- Opened: 19 May 1879
- Rebuilt: 1900
Location

Emerald railway station is a heritage-listed railway station on the Central Western railway line at Clermont Street (Capricorn Highway/Gregory Highway), Emerald, Central Highlands Region, Queensland, Australia. The building design was signed by Henrik Hansen was built in 1900 by Thomas Moir. It was added to the Queensland Heritage Register on 21 October 1992.

== Services ==
Emerald station is served by Traveltrain's Spirit of the Outback.

== History ==
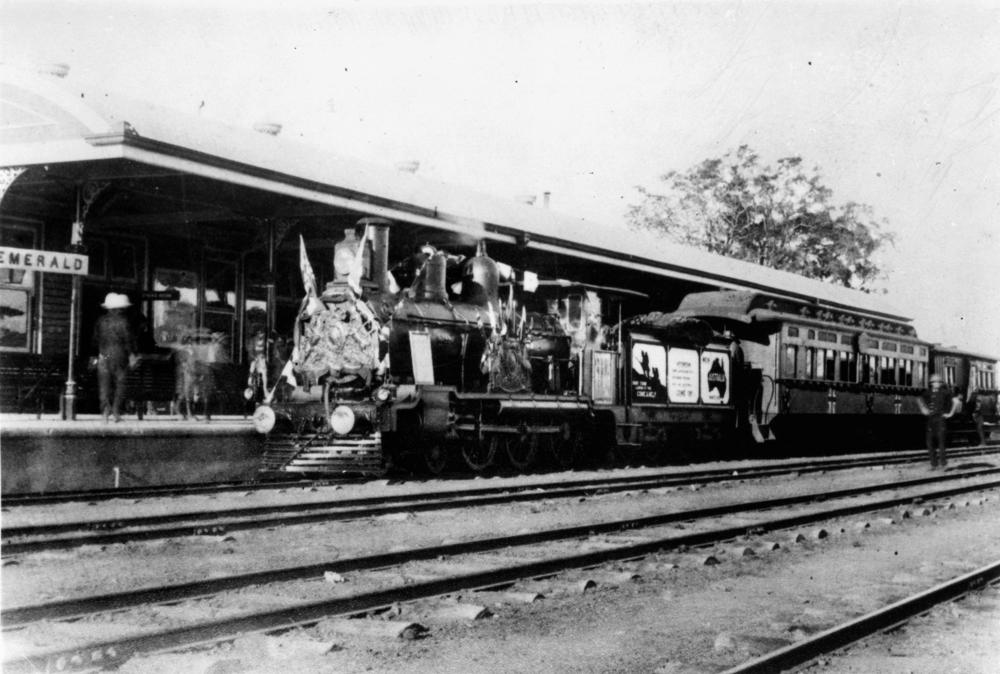
World War I recruiting train at Emerald station, circa 1916

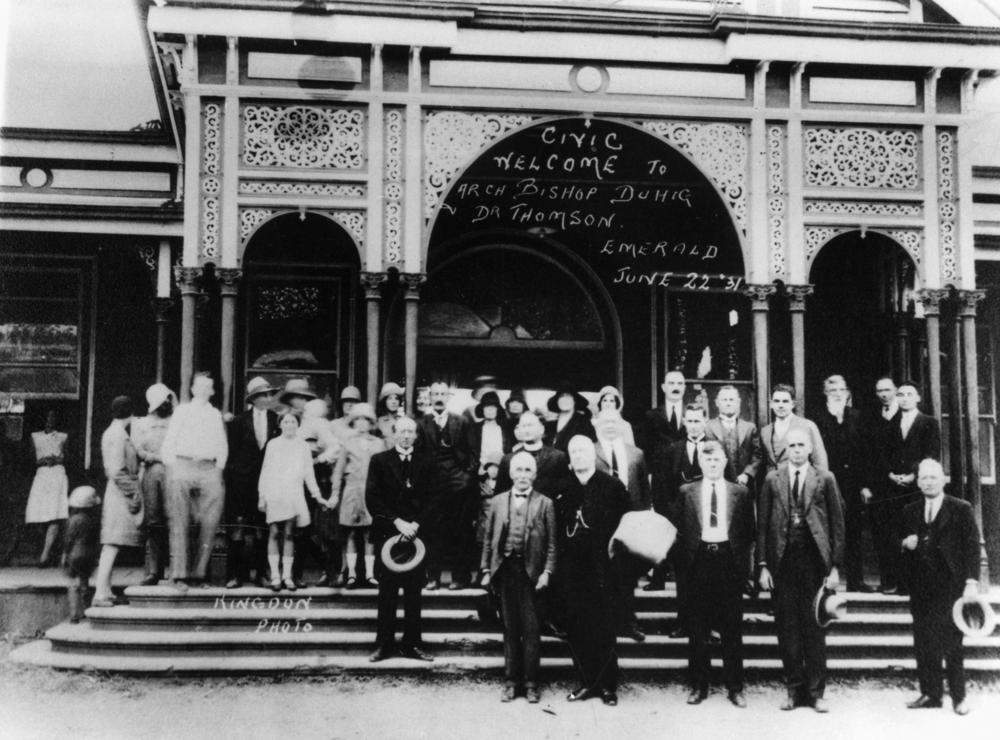
Civic welcome at Emerald railway station, 1931

Emerald railway station
- Location within Queensland
- 23.5266°S 148.1568°E
- Location: Clermont Street (Capricorn Highway/Gregory Highway), Emerald, Central Highlands Region, Queensland, Australia

History
- Design period: 1900–1914 (early 20th century)
- Built: 1900

Site notes
- Architect: Henrik Hansen
- Architectural style: Classicism

Queensland Heritage Register
- Official name: Emerald Railway Station Complex
- Type: state heritage (built)
- Designated: 21 October 1992
- Reference no.: 600490
- Significant period: 1900s (fabric, historical)
- Significant components: platform canopies/awnings (railway), carriage shade (railway), residential accommodation – staff quarters, shed – machinery, office/s, platform, views to, foyer – entrance, views from, railway station, ticket box/office
- Builders: Thomas Moir

The Central Western railway was extended from Comet to Emerald on 19 May 1879. Emerald was chosen as a point for branch lines to Clermont (1884) and Springsure (1887) to save building separate lines to each and to enable the main line to be extended due west. Although the railway extended west to Withersfield on 20 October 1880, Emerald's position as a railway junction made it a locomotive depot allowing Emerald to become a major regional centre.

The name Emerald was taken from a nearby property, Emerald Downs. In 1880 a goods shed and sheepyards were erected, and a coal stage in 1881. In 1882 an engine shed, fitting shop and smithy were erected. By 1885, with the building of the Clermont branch, a small repair shop and a new coal stage had also been built. In 1895 a contract was let for extension of the engine shed. Nothing is known of the original station building except that its removal to Raglan and Bajool was approved in 1903.

When Rockhampton Chamber of Commerce was advised in 1898 that a new refreshment room was to be built at Emerald, the Chamber pointed out the need for a new station building with a raised platform at this growing town. They were successful and a contract for the new station was awarded to Thomas Moir on 24 October 1900. The building design was signed by Henrik Hansen.

A new engine shed was built alongside the earlier one in 1926. This structure has since been demolished and a new building provided over the inspection and drop pit in 1983. It serves today as a wagon shed. Another shed having a bow string trussed roof similar to the original engine shed of 1882 is in situ and may have been built with parts obtained from this building or the original carriage shed. It was noted in 1964 that work had begun painting the station building. A fire in 1968 damaged the western (refreshment room) section of the station building. The building was subsequently repaired. The station building was listed by the National Trust in 1972. The refreshment rooms were reported to have been closed in May 1985. The station building was refurbished in February 1986, with the former refreshment rooms being used as offices and the platform shade being shortened by 1 metre (3 ft 3 in).

In 1972, the station building was listed by the National Trust. The railway refreshment room closed in May 1985. The station building was refurbished in February 1986, with the former refreshment rooms being used as offices. It was added to the Queensland Heritage Register on 21 October 1992.

== Description ==
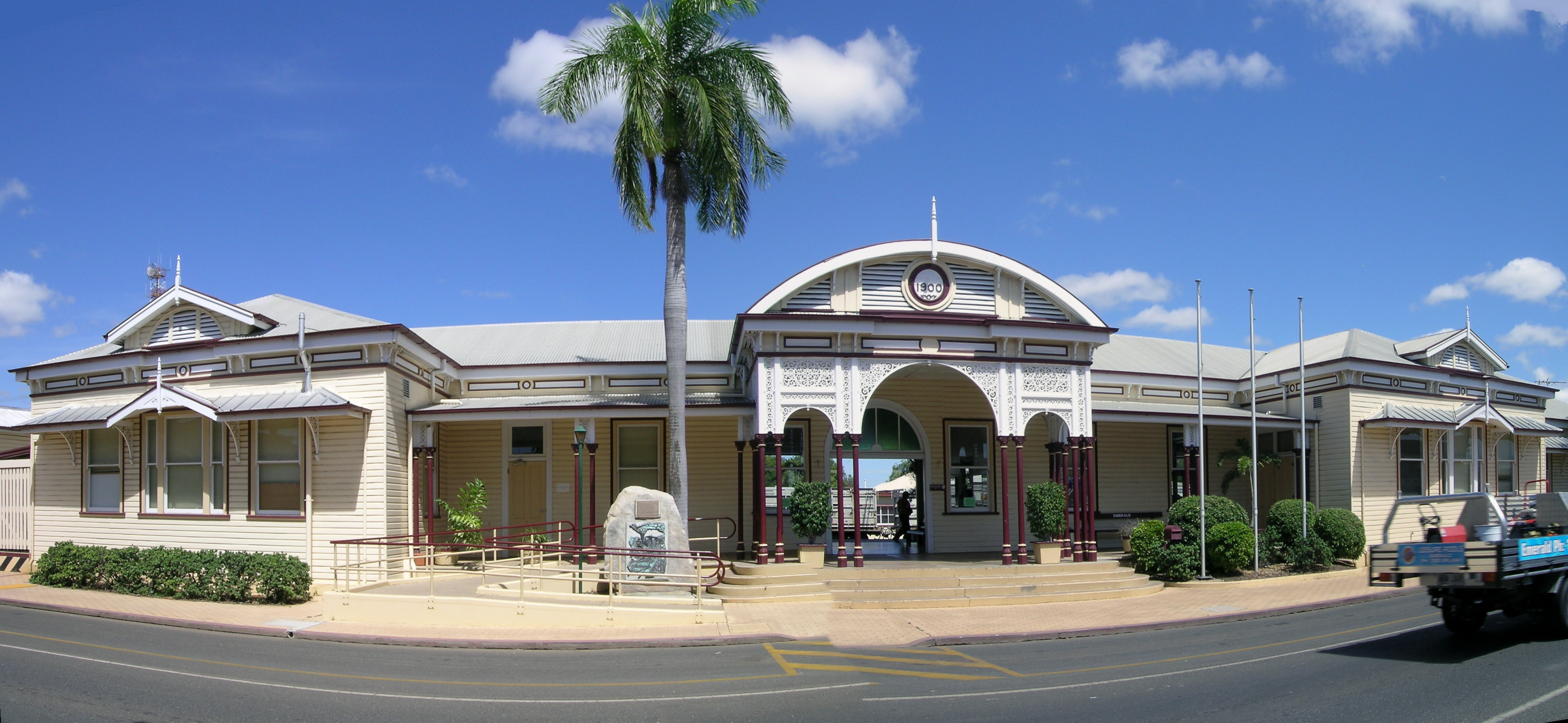
Emerald railway station, 2010

The station building and yard dominates the south side of the main street (Clermont Street). The station building, though very similar to earlier buildings of this group at Mount Morgan (1898) and Archer Park (1899), is distinguished by the semi-circular roof to the central portico which is in other respects similar to its precursors. Flanking pavilions are also distinctive elements having window shades and pedimented treatment with louvred lunettes, repeating the motif established by the central portico. The roadside verandah has cast iron columns and is partially built-in. The platform shade, unlike the carriage shades of the earlier designs has cast iron posts with a curved roof, comparing with South Brisbane (Melbourne Street) and Wallangarra. Accommodation consists of the central vestibule with former booking office and station masters office to the east (now office for maintenance staff and the stock officer) and former refreshment rooms to the west (now station offices). The recent interior fit-outs are generally unsympathetic although it is understood the original ceilings are in situ. Later quarters for refreshment room staff are attached at the west end. The goods shed is a 20-by-60-foot (6.1 m × 18.3 m) gable-roofed timber-frame c.g.i.-clad building with 2 doors to each side. The double rail weighbridge faces the passenger platform. The houses are contributary and also face the passenger platform from across the yard. The westernmost of the 3 is elevated with pyramidal roof, peripheral verandah and is relatively devoid of ornamentation. The present rolling stock depot includes a recent wagon shed erected over the site of the original engine shed drop pit which is stone and brick lined, and another shed 7 bays long with concrete floor slab and pit to a single siding and surmounting bow string truss roof.

== Heritage listing ==
Emerald Railway Station Complex was listed on the Queensland Heritage Register on 21 October 1992 having satisfied the following criteria.

The place is important in demonstrating the evolution or pattern of Queensland's history.

Emerald and Longreach are two of the largest towns in Queensland which were established as a result of being made the site of a railway station, rather than the railway being built to serve the town.

The Emerald station building group with weighbridge and houses expresses through its architecture and close association with the main street and war memorial (recently removed), the importance of the railway to the township in 1900 and thereafter.

The place is important in demonstrating the principal characteristics of a particular class of cultural places.

Its design is attributed to Henrik Hansen and it represents a high point in his career with the Chief Engineers branch as "draftsman deputed to plans for building construction".

The place is important because of its aesthetic significance.

The building is of distinctive design although forming one of a small group and represents its culmination given the existence of pavilions at either end.
