= QConnect =

Public transport network in Queensland

qconnect

Agency overview
- Formed: 20 December 2007
- Dissolved: 1 December 2025
- Superseding agency: Translink
- Jurisdiction: Regional Queensland
- Agency executive: Neil Scales, Director-General (Department of Transport and Main Roads)
- Parent department: Department of Transport and Main Roads
- Website: www.tmr.qld.gov.au/Travel-and-transport/qconnect

qconnect was a Queensland Government agency that operated public passenger transport services in regional Queensland, Australia. The agency provided greater connectivity and accessibility of services by working with contracted bus and aviation transport operators.

Between 2022 and 2025, operations were gradually transferred from the qconnect network to the Translink network, in order to create a more consistent and simplified brand. The last remaining qconnect network was transferred on 1 December 2025, thus abolishing the brand.

== Urban Bus Services ==
=== Infrastructure ===
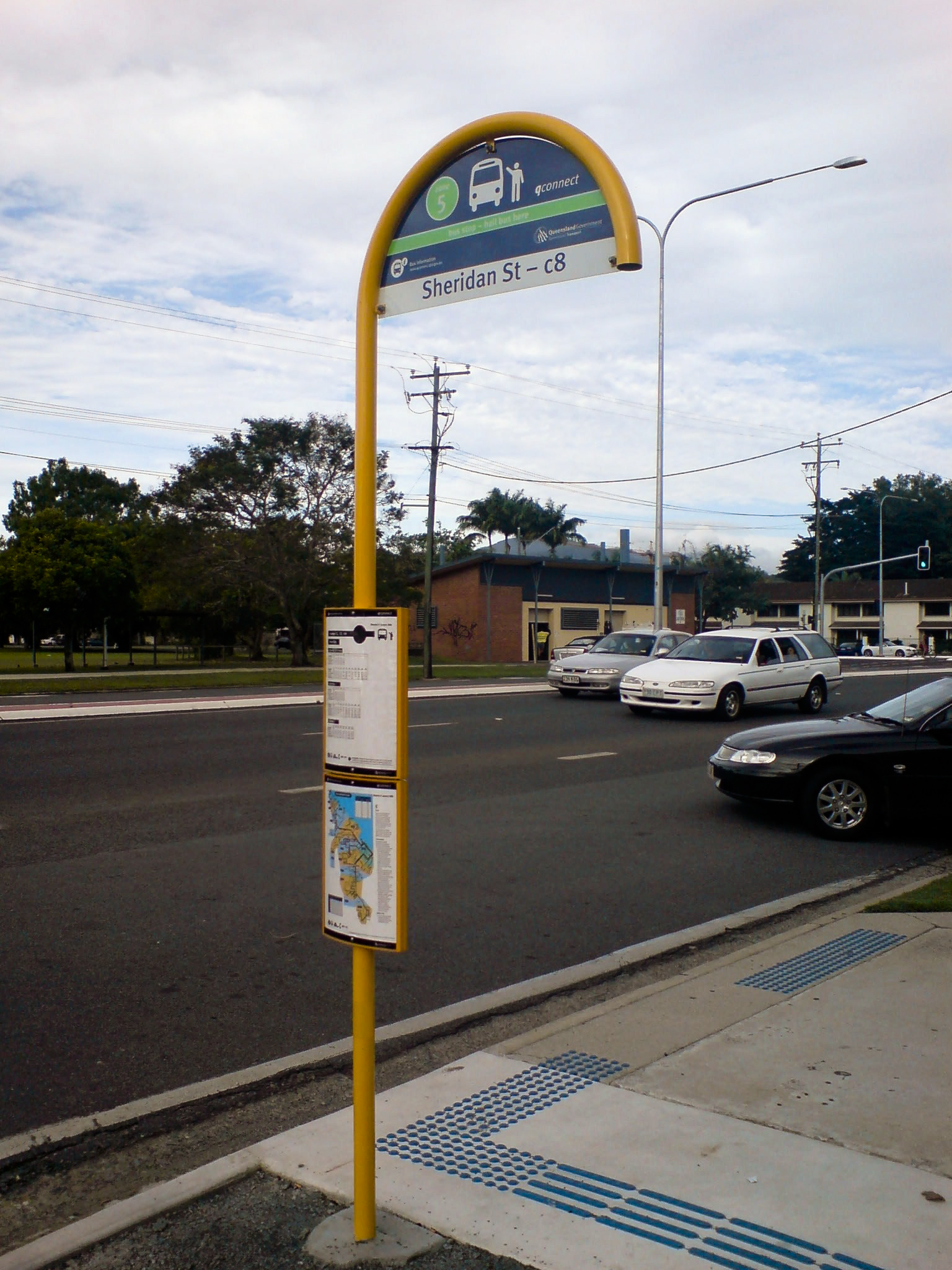
qconnect regular bus stop

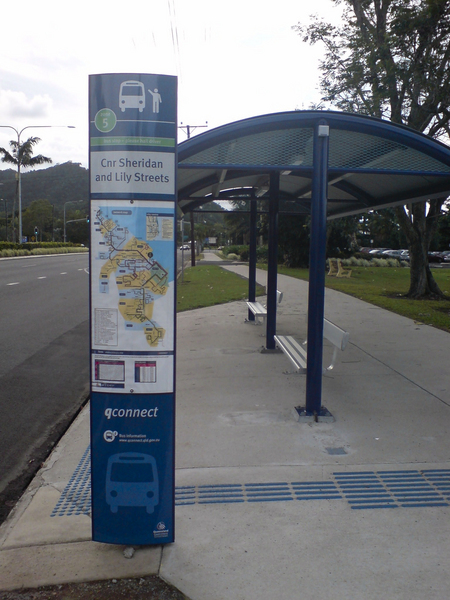
qconnect premium bus stop

The Department of Transport and Main Roads published standards for various qconnect bus stop designs, depending on the projected patronage and usage of the bus stop. All signed bus stops featured tactile ground surface indicators. All signed bus stops were wheelchair accessible.

Typical bus stops
| Bus stop type | Typical Locality | Features (non-exhaustive list) |
|---|---|---|
| Hail and Ride | Low demand suburban area | No infrastructure |
| Minimum | Low demand suburban area | Signage only |
| Regular | Low demand suburban or city area | Signage and seating |
| Intermediate | Moderate demand suburban or city area | Signage, seating, rubbish bin, and shelter |
| Premium | High demand city area | Signage, seating, rubbish bin, shelter, vending machine, and CCTV |

=== Fares ===
qconnect fares were originally calculated using a zone system, with fare bands radiating from the city or town centre. 50% concessions were available for seniors, veterans, asylum seekers, and students at primary school, high school, university, and TAFE. Children aged four and under, as well as blind passengers and holders of Companion Cards travelled for free.

In August 2024, the Miles Government introduced a six-month trial of a flat rate 50c fare for all Translink services in Queensland. The following Crisafulli Government made this initiative permanent in November 2024. The 50c fare scheme was also made available to the last remaining qconnect network on North Stradbroke Island.

=== Tickets ===
The following ticket types were available on qconnect urban bus services:

- qconnect Single: one-way travel
- qconnect Daily: unlimited travel until the last service on the same day
- qconnect Weekly: unlimited travel until the last service for seven days
- qconnect Monthly: unlimited travel until the last service for one calendar month
- qconnect Ten-Trip: ten one-way trips, any time during a twelve-month period

== Regional Aviation Services ==
Queensland Transport administered contracts for particular air routes across regional Queensland. In the financial year 2006–07, these contracts were held by MacAir Airlines, Qantas, and West Wing Aviation. The introduction of qconnect in 2007 sought to bring these regional aviation services under the same brand over a period of two years.

MacAir Airlines was placed in receivership by its creditors in January 2009. The Queensland Government issued emergency contracts in February 2009, with services to be operated by SkyTrans, Qantas, and West Wing Aviation. These emergency contracts were replaced by long-term qconnect contracts in December 2009, with services to be operated by SkyTrans, Qantas, and Regional Express (Rex).

In 2014, all regional aviation services were transferred to the administration of Translink.

== See also ==
- Translink
- Department of Transport and Main Roads
