= Spirit of Capricorn =

Australian train service

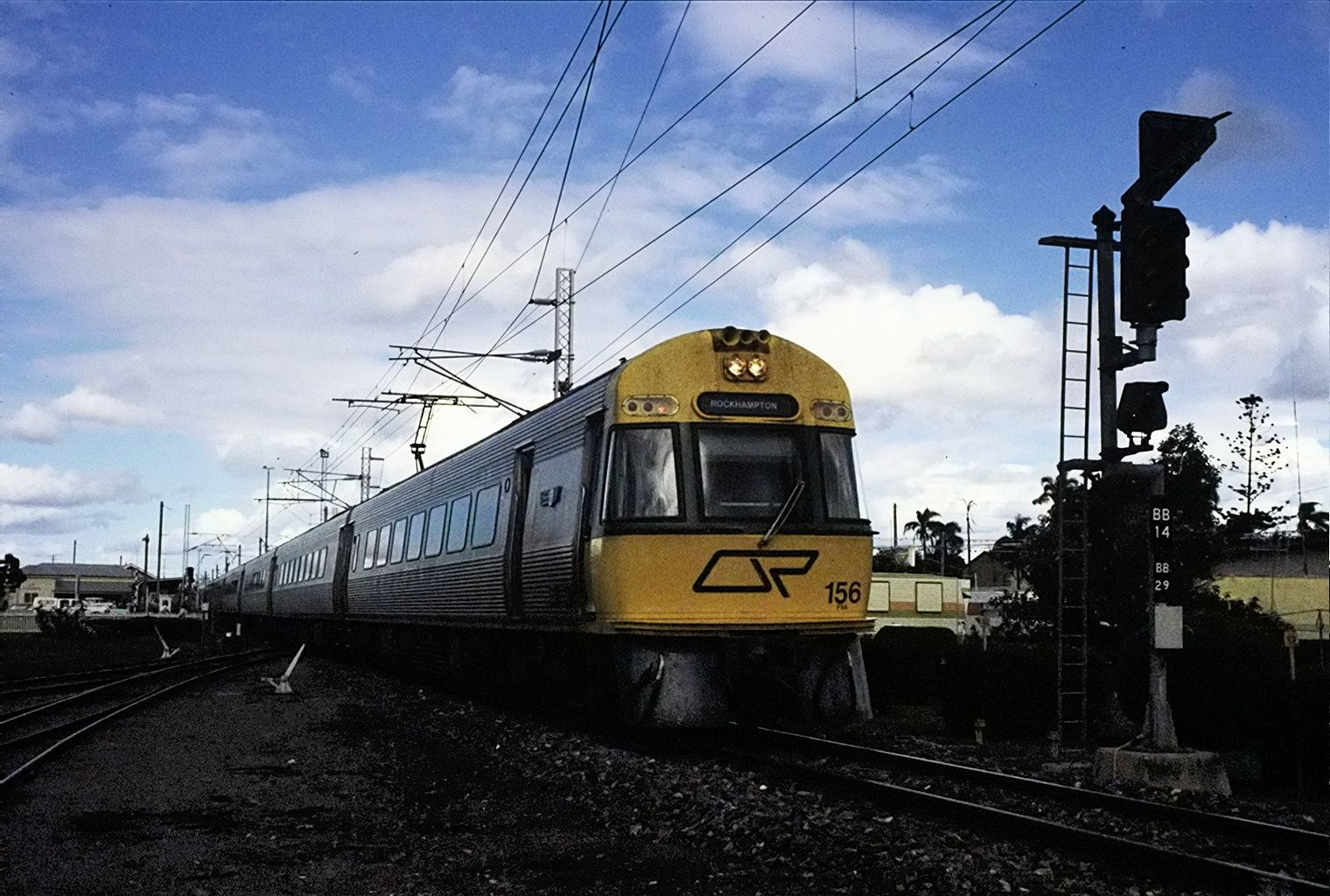
- Spirit of Capricorn departing Bundaberg Railway Station in 1989.
- In service: 3 July 1989 to 24 May 2003
- Manufacturer: Walkers Limited
- Built at: Maryborough
- Replaced: 24 May 2003
- Entered service: 1989
- Number built: 20 carriages
- Number in service: Zero
- Formation: 4 × 6 carriage sets
- Fleet numbers: 151–158
- Operator: Queensland Rail
- Line served: North Coast

Specifications
- Maximum speed: 120 kilometres per hour (75 mph)
- Track gauge: 1,067 mm (3 ft 6 in)

The Spirit of Capricorn was a long distance passenger rail service in Queensland, Australia, operated by Queensland Rail Traveltrain between 1988 and 24 May 2003. It operated between Rockhampton, Queensland and the capital of the state, Brisbane at its station Roma Street.

== Route ==
The Spirit of Capricorn commenced service on 3 July 1989 as the Main Line Electrification Project between Caboolture and Gladstone was completed. Initially, the InterCity Express sets ordered for this service had been in use from 1988 to operate services to Nambour, and then to Gympie North as the line was energised. The Spirit of Capricorn route follows the North Coast line alignment, the same as the loco-hauled Capricornian service. Due to the introduction of the Spirit of Capricorn, the Capricornian service was reduced to three times per week, eventually merging with The Midlander to form the Spirit of the Outback in 1993. The service ran from Roma Street Station to Rockhampton Station, stopping at several stations including Nambour, Gympie North, Bundaberg and Gladstone. Service time on the route was reduced by over three hours, with the Spirit of Capricorn completing the journey in around nine hours, as opposed to the Capricornian completing the journey (post electrification) in a little over 12 hours and 30 minutes.

== Onboard ==
The service onboard the Spirit of Capricorn was marketed as "airline style". The seating layout was in a 2 x 1 "First Class" setup, with a to-seat trolley service offered in lieu of a dining or lounge car. The trolley service was stocked from aircraft style galleys that featured ovens, fridges and urns. Seating was reversible so that groups could be seated together, and originally featured a yellow and green fabric which matched the exterior colour scheme of the InterCity Express sets. An in-seat audio system was also provided.

== Demise ==
Queensland Rail introduced the Tilt Train service in 1998 which runs between Brisbane and Bundaberg or Rockhampton. A reduced travel time was achieved due to the Tilt Train's 160 kilometres per hour (99 mph) operating speed combined with a tilting system; this technology and speed was superior to the Spirit of Capricorn's InterCity Express sets. Due to this, the Spirit of Capricorn services were reduced to once a week, departing Brisbane for Rockhampton on Saturday morning and returning with passengers from Rockhampton to Brisbane on Sunday morning only as required.

Spirit of Capricorn services ended on 24 May 2003 after the introduction of the new Diesel Tilt Train service operating from Brisbane to Cairns. The InterCity Express sets were re-allocated to operate Citytrain services, primarily serving the Sunshine Coast Line. The remaining InterCity Express sets were retired from service in November 2021.

== See also ==
- InterCity Express (Queensland Rail)
- Capricornian
