= Electric Tilt Train =

Type of Australian train

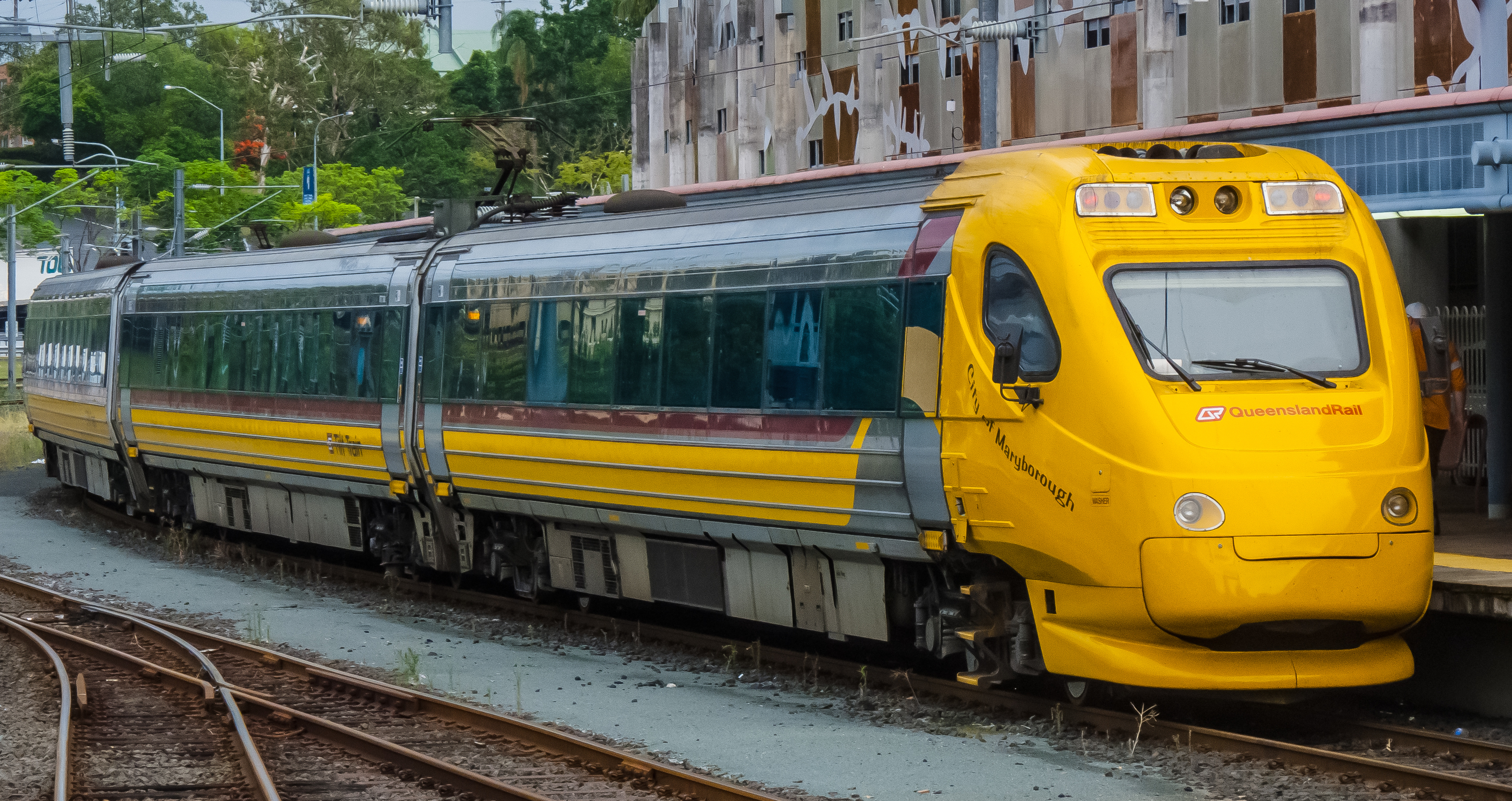
- "City of Maryborough" at Roma Street station

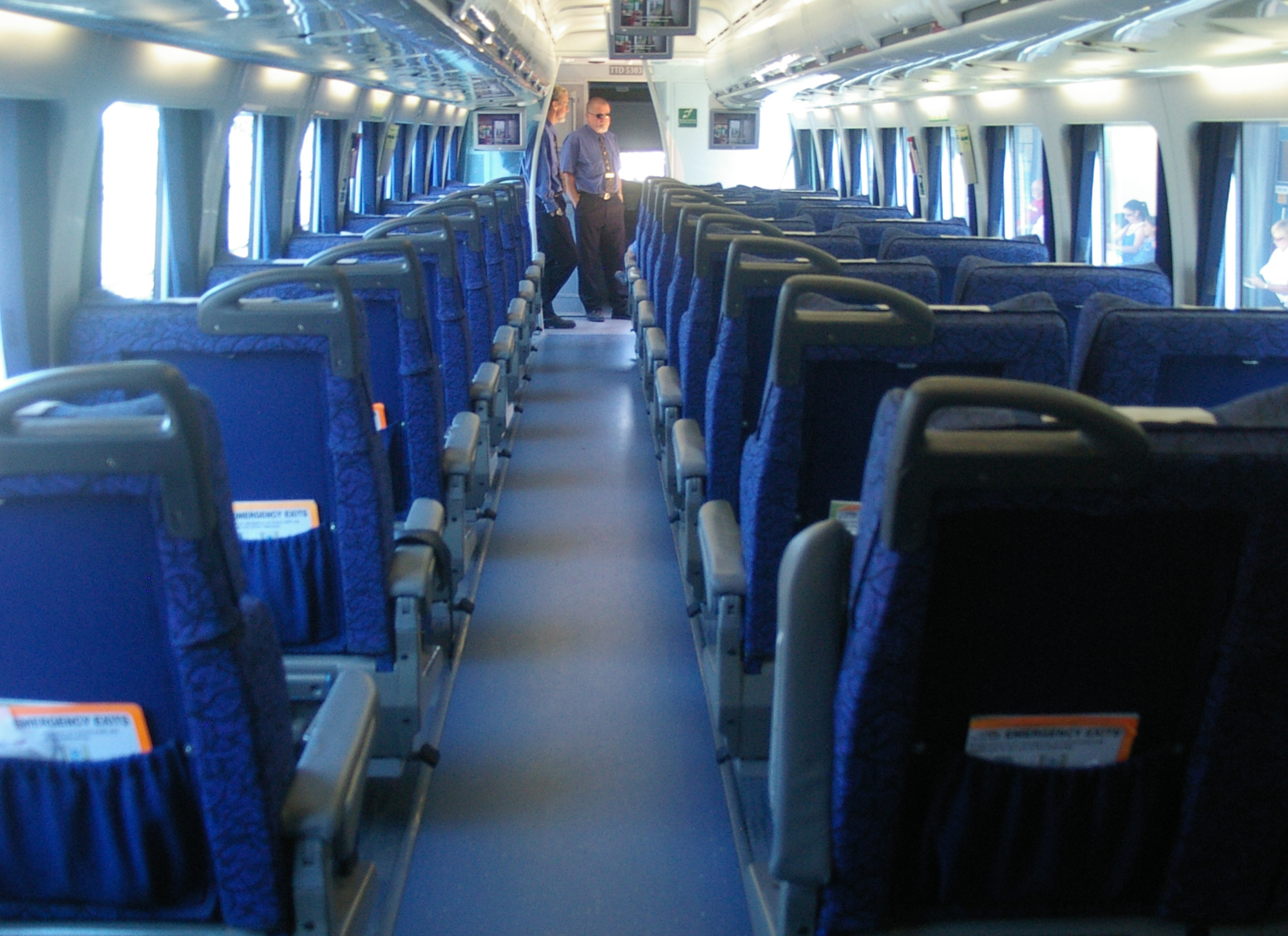
- Interior
- In service: 1998–present
- Manufacturer: Walkers Limited
- Built at: Maryborough
- Constructed: 1997–1998
- Entered service: 6 November 1998
- Number built: 2
- Number in service: 2
- Formation: 6-car sets TTD1–TTT–TTM+TTM–TTT–TTD2
- Fleet numbers: 301/302 and 303/304
- Operator: Queensland Rail
- Depots: Mayne, Gracemere
- Line served: North Coast

Specifications
- Car body construction: Stainless steel
- Train length: 136 m (446 ft 2 in)
- Car length: 23.4 m (76 ft 9 in) (TTD); 22.3 m (73 ft 2 in) (TTT, TTM)
- Width: 2,837 mm (9 ft 3.7 in)
- Height: 3,615 mm (11 ft 10.3 in)
- Floor height: 1.2 m (3 ft 11 in)
- Wheel diameter: 810 mm (32 in)
- Wheelbase: Per bogie: 2.25 m (7 ft 5 in); Between bogie centres: 16 m (52 ft 6 in)
- Maximum speed: Service: 160 km/h (100 mph); Record: 210 km/h (130 mph)
- Weight: 44 t (43 long tons; 49 short tons) (TTD1); 45 t (44 long tons; 50 short tons) (TTD2); 47 t (46 long tons; 52 short tons) (TTT); 43 t (42 long tons; 47 short tons) (TTM)
- Traction system: Hitachi PWM 3-level IGBT–VVVF
- Traction motors: 16 × Hitachi 170 kW (230 hp) 3-phase AC induction motor
- Power output: 2.72 MW (3,650 hp)
- Deceleration: 1.05 m/s^{2} (3.4 ft/s^{2}) (service)
- Electric system: 25 kV 50 Hz AC (nominal) from overhead catenary
- Current collection: Pantograph
- UIC classification: Bo′Bo′+2′2′+Bo′Bo′+Bo′Bo′+2′2′+Bo′Bo′
- Braking systems: Regenerative electric and electro-pneumatic disc brakes
- Track gauge: 1,067 mm (3 ft 6 in)

The Electric Tilt Train (ETT) is a type of high-speed tilting train, operated and maintained by Queensland Rail. The ETT runs services on the North Coast line from Brisbane to Bundaberg and Rockhampton, as part of the Tilt Train service. Having reached 210 km/h (130 mph), it is the fastest narrow-gauge train type in the world.

== History ==
In March 1993, Queensland Rail issued a tender for the construction of two electric six-carriage tilting trains. In October 1994, a contract was awarded to Walkers, Maryborough with Hitachi to supply the electrical and tilting equipment. The ETT initially began tests on 12 August 1997 when it conducted its first run between Maryborough West and Gympie North stations. This was later followed by tests from Maryborough West to Roma Street on 25 October 1997 and first trial run to Rockhampton on 15 November 1997. November 1997 also saw the train conduct the first testing involving its Tilting mechanism.

On 6 November 1998, Australia's first pair of tilting trains entered service between Brisbane and Rockhampton. Simply marketed as the "Tilt Train", the journey time was reduced from nine hours to seven hours. In July 1999, a second daily service was introduced between Brisbane and Bundaberg. In May 2003, the Tilt Train service completely replaced the Spirit of Capricorn service.

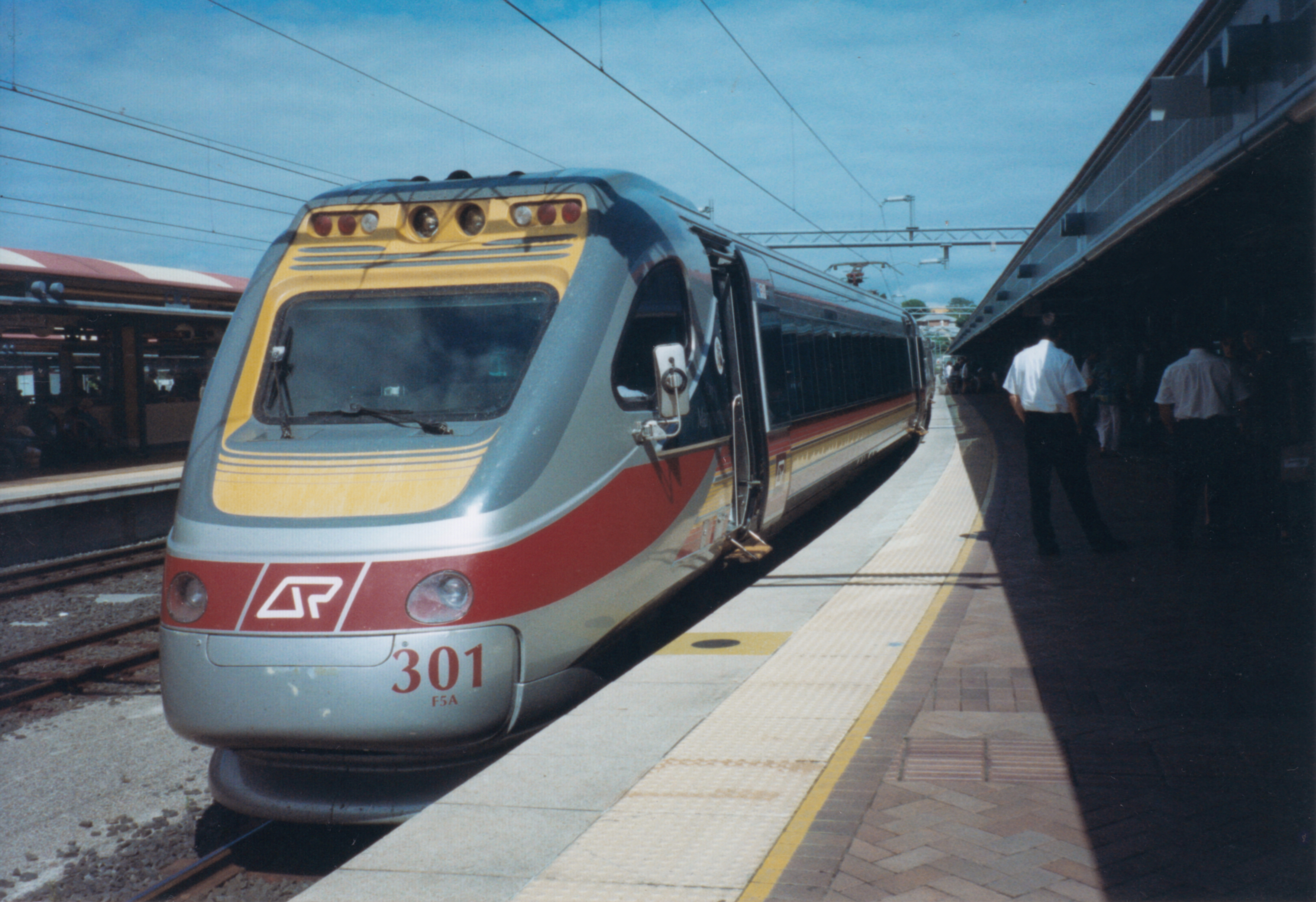
Set 301/302 in the original livery at Roma Street station

In May 1999, the ETT set an Australian train speed record of 210 km/h (130 mph) north of Bundaberg, using traction equipment based on the JR Shikoku 8000 series trains. The record still stands and makes it the fastest narrow-gauge train in the world.

The sets have undergone several refurbishments over the years. In 2006, the electric sets underwent an $8.3 million refurbishment program at Mayne depot. In 2015, the tilt train sets again undertook refurbishment over the course of 12 months with the addition of high visibility yellow doors, and a modification of the front ends. The traction packages were given a complete overhaul to extend the life of the tilt train. The trains also had Wi-Fi installed to enable wireless internet for passengers. The first refurbished set re-entered service in July 2016. The second refurbished set re-entered service in July 2017. Both of these refurbishment programs saw the introduction of a loco-hauled "Tilt Train Replacement Service" (known informally as the "Tiltlander") that was formed of spare L-series sitting cars and a dining car, with a M-series staff car and available power van. In mid-2023, a 14 month program began to perform heavy maintenance on the sets (with one set out of service at a time). Instead of a loco-hauled replacement service operating in lieu of the second service, a modified timetable was introduced with no Tilt Train service provided on a Wednesday and no service starting/ending at Bundaberg.

A driving cab is found at each end of the train, however usually the odd-numbered cab car will lead when in service and the train is turned to face the correct direction on either a loop or triangle to ensure this is the case. Sets 301/302 are named "City of Maryborough", whilst sets 303/304 are named "City of Rockhampton".

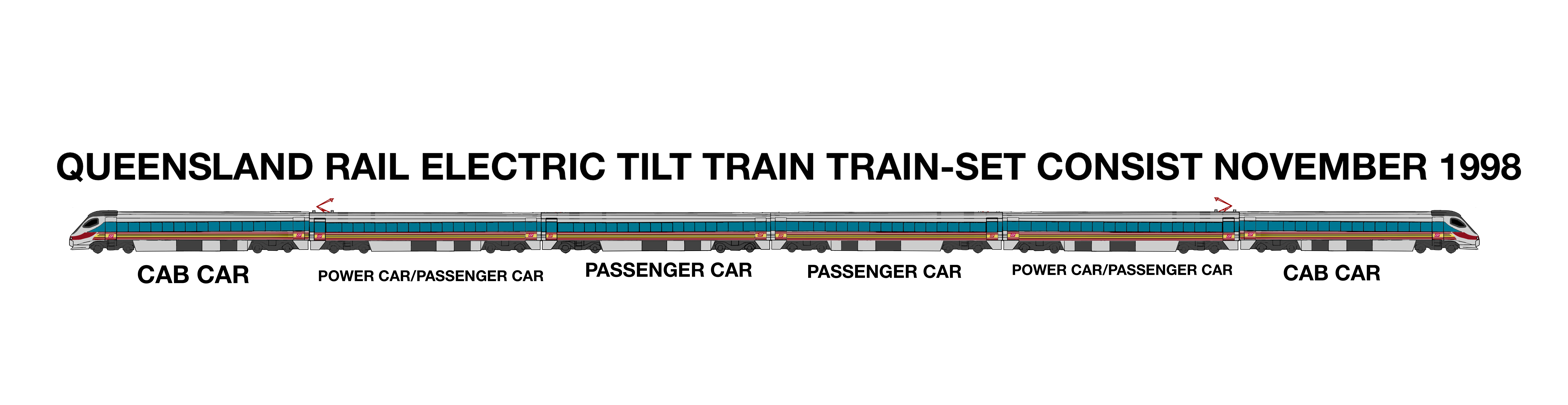
The standard formation of ETTs from 6 November 1998

== Interior ==
The ETT consists of 1 Business Class carriage (Car A) and 5 Economy Class carriages (Cars B to F). The Business Class layout is in a 2 x 1 seating configuration with large reclining seats, the same as the previous InterCity Express sets used on the Spirit of Capricorn service. The Economy Class layout is in a 2 x 2 seating configuration with regular reclining seats. All carriages feature enclosed, aircraft style overhead lockers for hand luggage. A to-seat trolley service is provided to passengers in both classes of travel, however the two galleys that stock the trolley service (located in Cars B and E) are available for passengers to purchase food and drink from directly. When the service was introduced, Business Class passengers were provided with a meal as part of their ticket. The service was discontinued only a few years later, and Business Class passengers are now required to purchase food and drink (although a welcome drink is provided). An audio and video system is provided throughout the train in both classes of travel. Wheelchair spaces are found in Car A, along with an accessible toilet.

== Routes ==
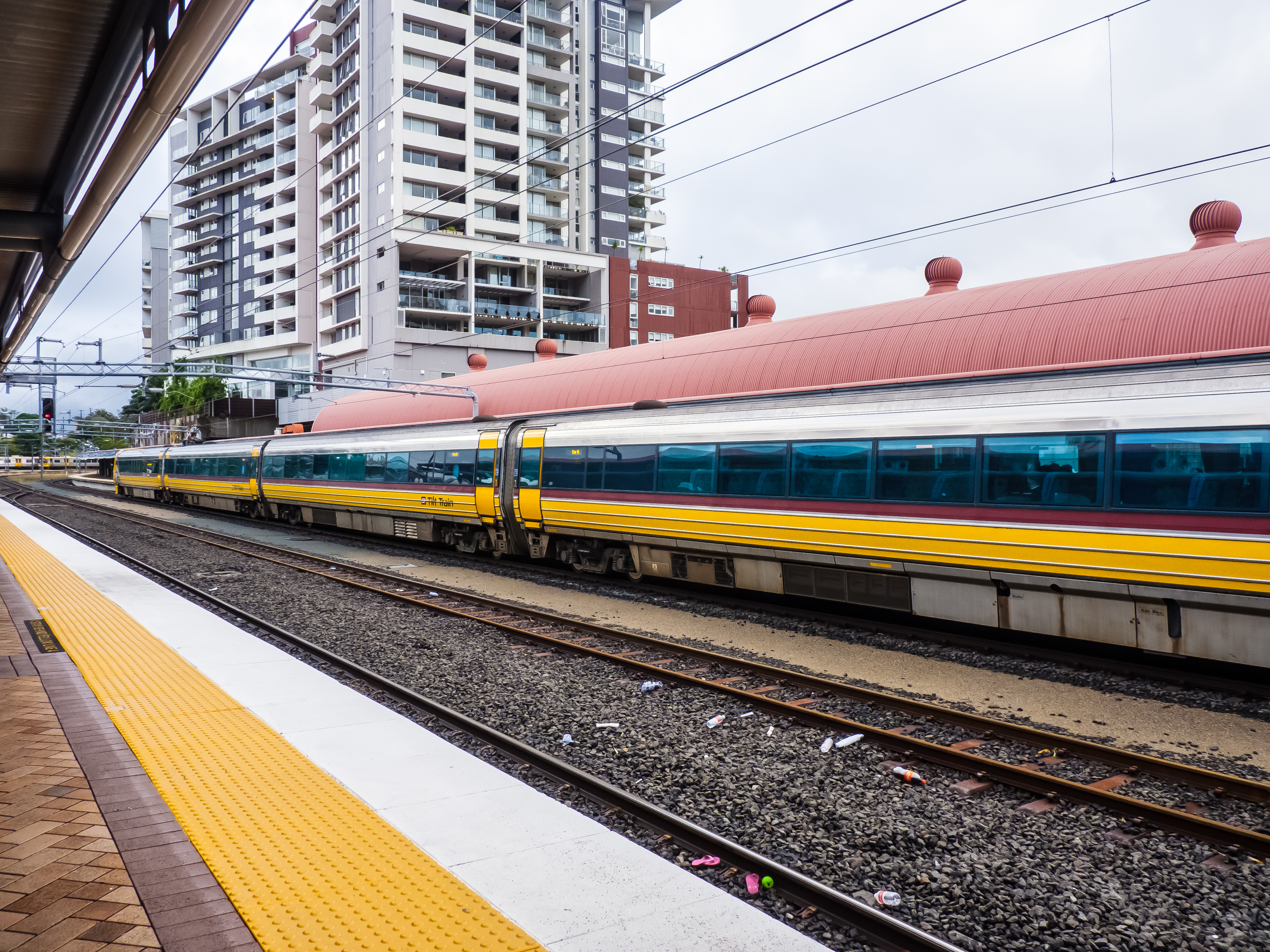
Carriages

The ETT operates the Tilt Train service from Brisbane to Bundaberg and Rockhampton along the North Coast line. The service calls at several stations along the route, including Gympie, Maryborough and Gladstone. The stopping pattern is the same as the previous Spirit of Capricorn service.
