= Mount Larcom railway station =

Railway station in Queensland, Australia

Mount Larcom
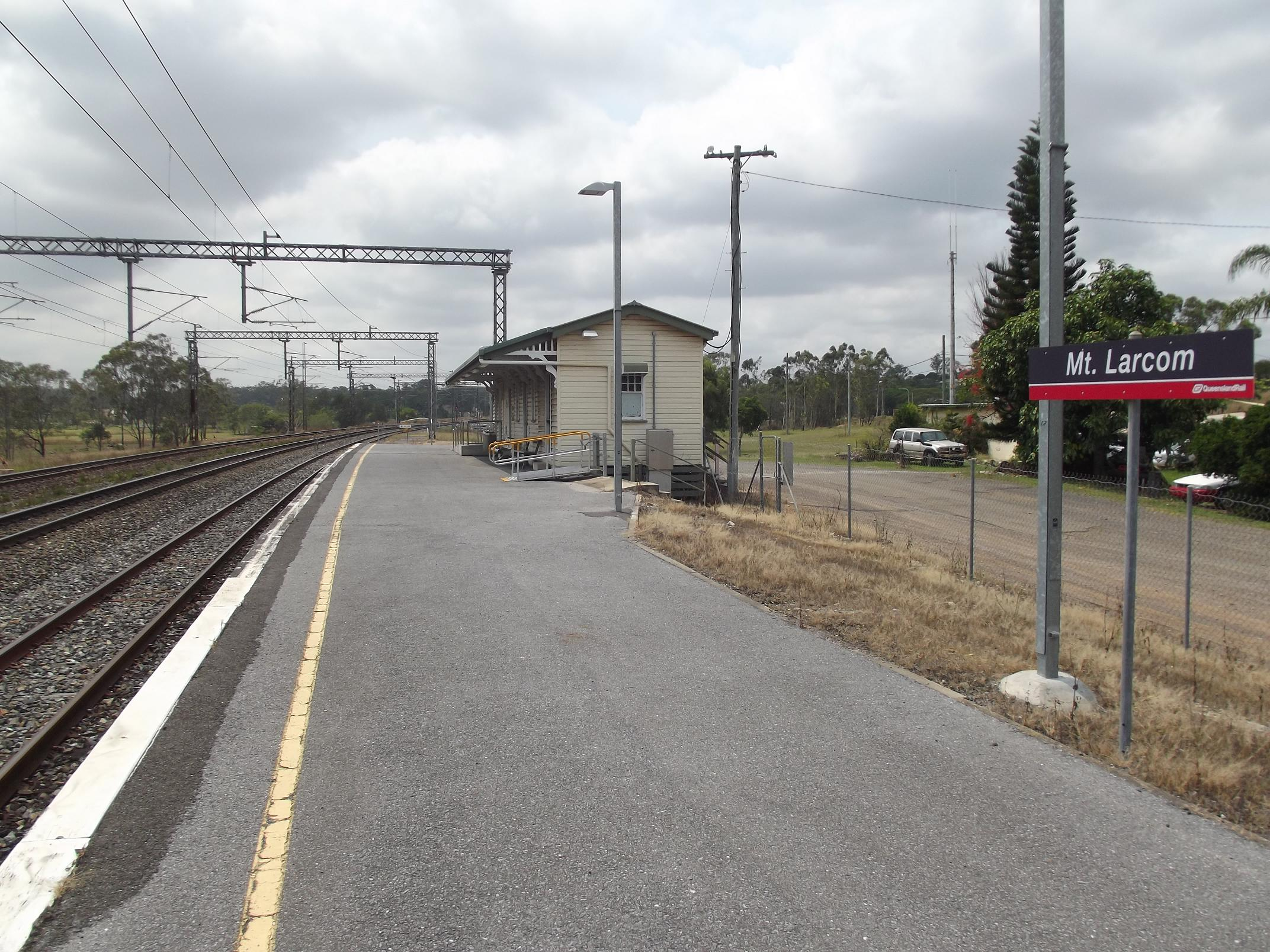
- Southbound view in November 2012

General information
- Location: Bruce Highway, Mount Larcom
- Coordinates: 23.8079°S 150.9786°E
- Owner: Queensland Rail
- Operator: Traveltrain
- Line: North Coast
- Platforms: 1
- Tracks: 3

Construction
- Structure type: Ground
- Accessible: Yes

Services
Preceding station	Queensland Rail	Following station
Gladstone towards Brisbane	Spirit of Queensland	Rockhampton towards Cairns
Gladstone towards Brisbane	Tilt Train	Rockhampton Terminus
Gladstone towards Brisbane	Spirit of the Outback	Rockhampton towards Longreach
Location

Mount Larcom railway station is located on the North Coast line in Queensland, Australia. It serves the town of Mount Larcom. It features a single platform with a wooden structure. Opposite lie two passing loops.

== Services ==
Mount Larcom is served by long-distance Traveltrain services; the Spirit of Queensland, Spirit of the Outback and Rockhamption Tilt Train.
