= DownsSteam Tourist Railway & Museum =

Railway museum in Drayton, Australia

- Established: 2001
- Location: Drayton
- Coordinates: 27.59302°S 151.917039°E
- Type: Railway museum
- Website: www.downssteam.com

The DownsSteam Tourist Railway & Museum was founded in 2001 in the Toowoomba suburb of Drayton in Queensland. It operates under the auspices of the Great Divide Scenic Railway.

The station building on the complex was originally situated at Yuleba, between Roma and Miles servicing the town of Yuleba from 1879 to 2008. The building was purchased by the Museum after it was replaced by the present-day Yuleba Railway Station in 2008.

It currently runs train trips using the restored steam locomotives the Pride of Toowoomba C16-106 (the last steam locomotive built at Toowoomba's historic Foundry, circa 1914) and the BB18¼ 1037, along with the Commissioner's Inspection Railmotor, using the Great Divide Scenic Railway brand with former Lander carriages that were delivered in June 2015.

It has the following collection:

- Queensland Railways locomotive 106
- Queensland Railways locomotive 1172
- Queensland Railways locomotive 1177 (Used for parts on 1172, Scrapped)
- Tasmanian Government Railways railcar DP13 (No longer at DownSteam) -
- 7 SX carriages
- M series carriages - MBSC 1486, MCS 1466, MAS 1494, MBC 1449, MBS 1483, MBL 1506 & MBLM 1526 (Rear of site, not on track), MCC 1503, MCD 1516,
- 2000 class rail motor "The Commissioner"
