= Gladstone railway station, Queensland =

Railway station in Queensland, Australia

Gladstone
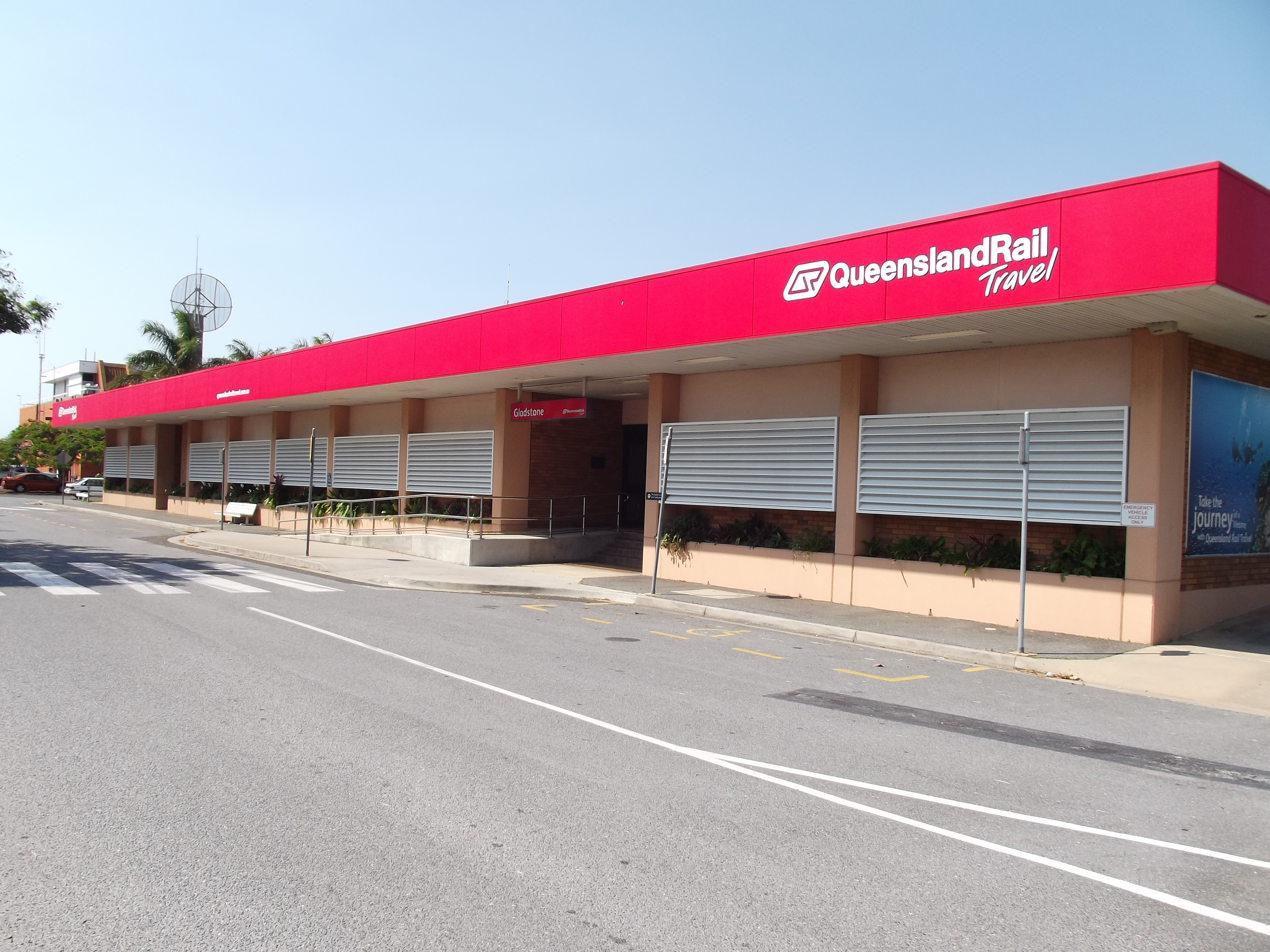
- Station front in November 2012

General information
- Location: Corner Tank & Toolooa Streets, Gladstone
- Coordinates: 23°50′47″S 151°15′47″E
- Owner: Queensland Rail
- Operator: Traveltrain
- Line: North Coast
- Distance: 511.95 kilometres from Central
- Platforms: 1

Construction
- Structure type: Ground
- Accessible: Yes

Services
Preceding station	Queensland Rail	Following station
Miriam Vale towards Brisbane	Spirit of Queensland	Mount Larcom towards Cairns
Miriam Vale towards Brisbane	Tilt Train	Mount Larcom towards Rockhampton
Miriam Vale towards Brisbane	Spirit of the Outback	Mount Larcom towards Longreach
Location

Gladstone railway station is located on the North Coast line in Queensland, Australia. It serves the city of Gladstone.

It is a major hub for Central Queensland rail services, and is a major freight depot.

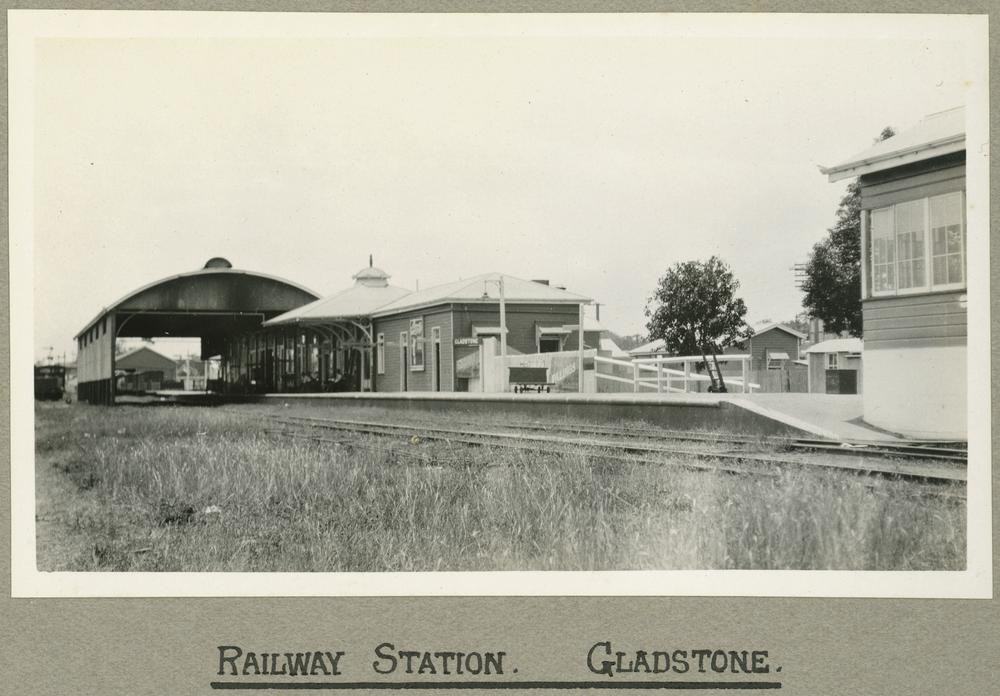
The station in 1924

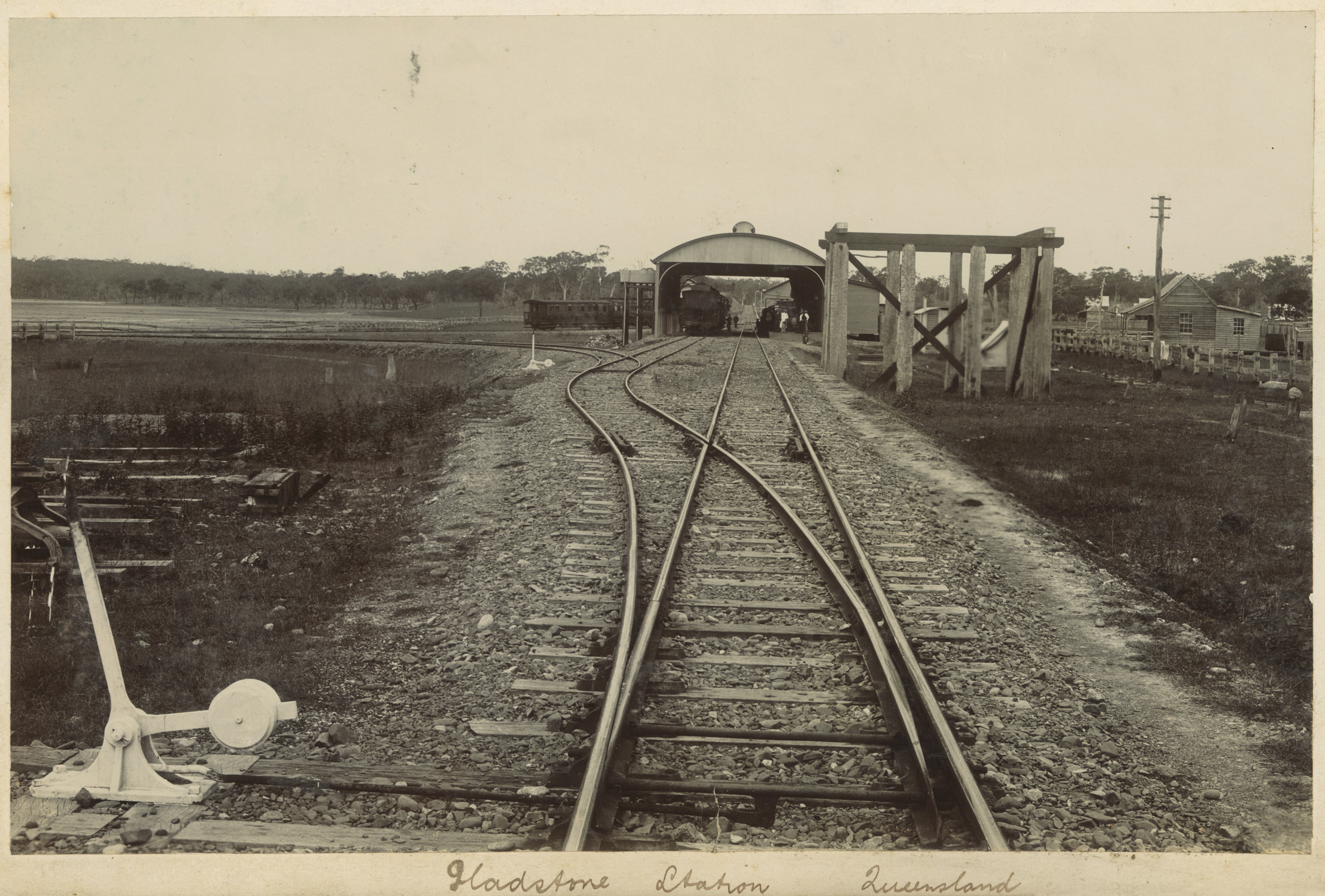
Gladstone railway station, ca. 1895

== Services ==
Gladstone is served by long-distance Traveltrain services; the Spirit of Queensland, Spirit of the Outback and Rockhamption Tilt Train.

== Transport links ==
Gladstone station is served by CDC Gladstone bus routes 500 and 501.
