= Rockhampton railway station =

Railway station in Queensland, Australia

Rockhampton
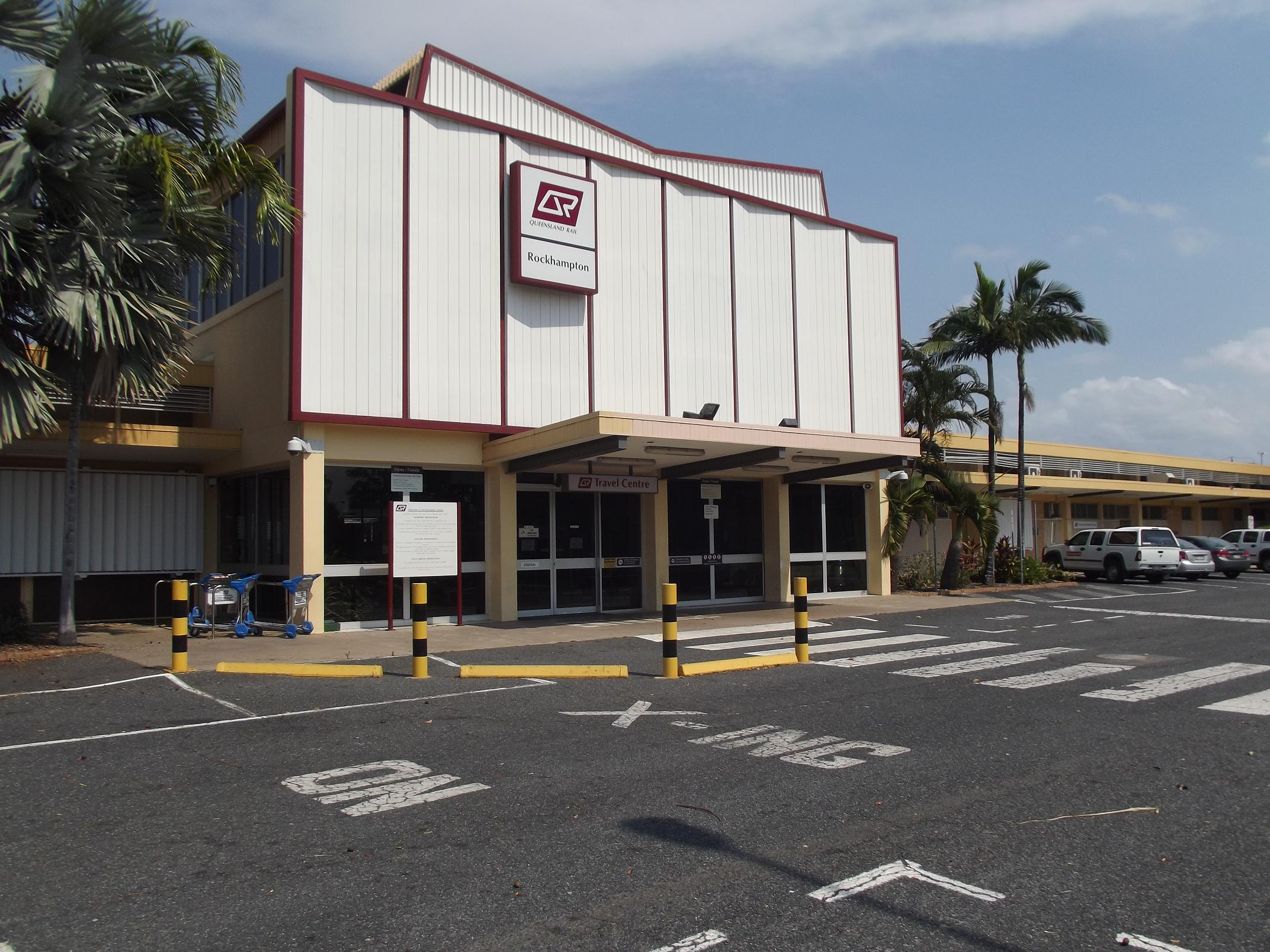
- Station front in November 2012

General information
- Location: George Street, Depot Hill; Australia
- Coordinates: 23°23′23″S 150°30′44″E
- Owner: Queensland Rail
- Operator: Traveltrain
- Line: North Coast
- Distance: 619.94 km from Brisbane Central
- Platforms: 5 (2 bay, 1 side, 1 island)

Construction
- Structure type: Ground
- Accessible: Yes

History
- Opened: 24 August 1973

Services
Preceding station	Queensland Rail	Following station
Mount Larcom towards Brisbane	Spirit of Queensland	St Lawrence towards Cairns
Mount Larcom towards Brisbane	Tilt Train	Terminus
Mount Larcom towards Brisbane	Spirit of the Outback	Duaringa towards Longreach
Location

Rockhampton railway station is located on the North Coast line in Queensland, Australia. It serves the city of Rockhampton.

It is the terminus of the electrified section of line from Brisbane. The line north of the station runs along the middle of Denison Street in a single track.

Rockhampton is an important transport hub in the Central Queensland region, providing important transport links between the Central Highlands and Capricorn Coast regions and the areas to the north and south of the state.

Rockhampton was also the junction of the Central Western line and Emu Park line.

In January 2023, public consultation was undertaken to help shape the station's redevelopment. A new customer lounge and shelters will be built, as well as accessible car parking and improved connectivity to other public transport.

== Services ==
Rockhampton is served by long-distance Traveltrain services the Spirit of Queensland and Spirit of the Outback. It is also the terminus for the Tilt Train service.

Rockhampton was previously served by the Sunshine Express, Sunlander, Queenslander, Spirit of Capricorn and Capricornian on the North Coast line and Midlander on the Central Western line.
