= Queensland Railways steel carriage stock =

The Queensland Railways ordered two different types of steel bodied air-conditioned carriage stock, both built by Commonwealth Engineering at their Rocklea plant. Over the years these carriages have been used on many different long distance Queensland Rail services.

All Queensland Rail Travel (formerly "Traveltrain") services are now operated only with L Series carriages.

== M Series Carriage Stock ==
M series
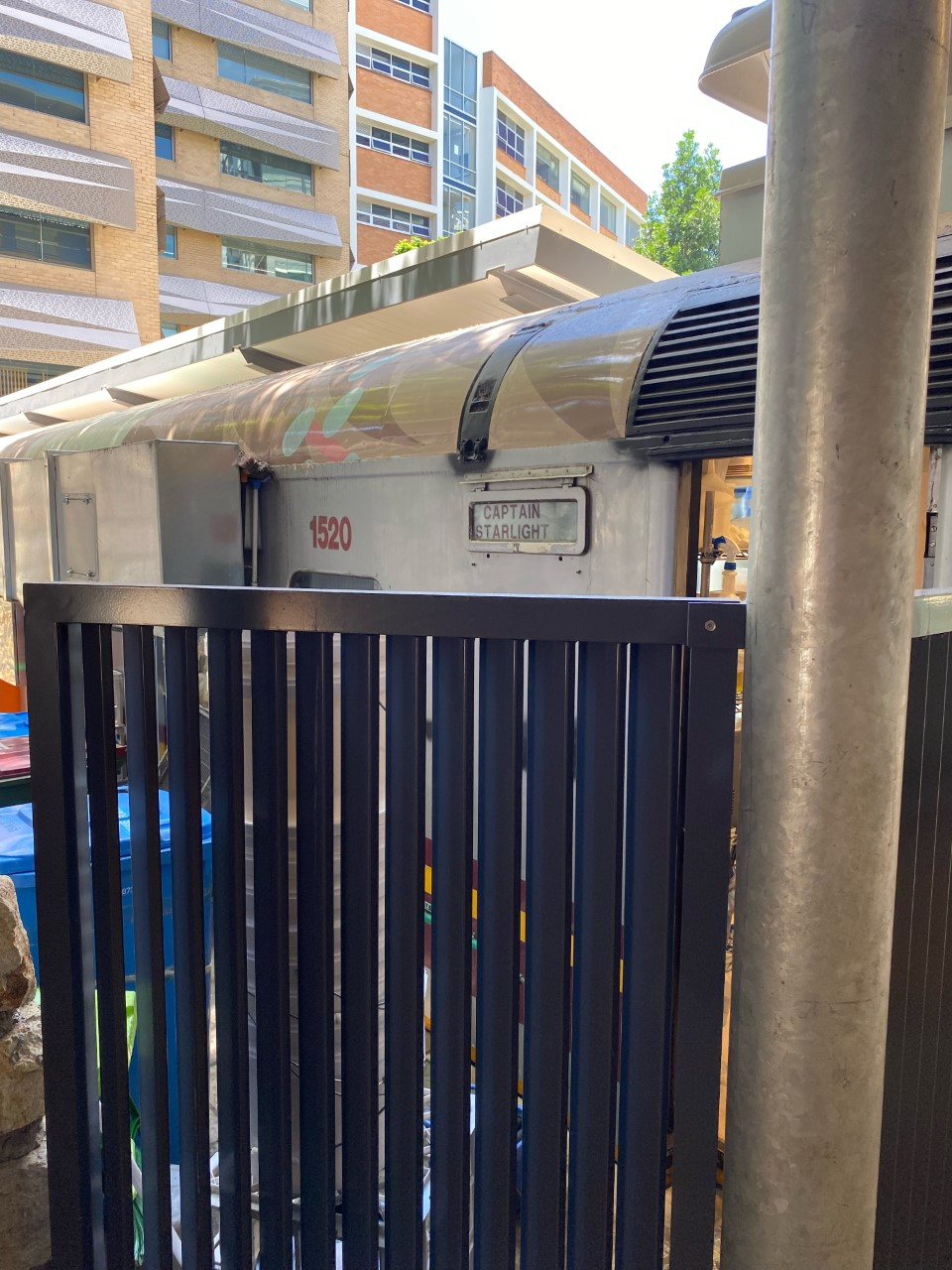
- MCC 1520, one of the M series carriages built
- In service: 1953–2014
- Manufacturer: Commonwealth Engineering
- Built at: Rocklea
- Constructed: 1953–1955
- Number built: 99
- Operators: Queensland Rail

Specifications
- Track gauge: 1,067 mm (3 ft 6 in)

In January 1950, Queensland Railways awarded a contract for 99 steel bodied carriages to Commonwealth Engineering, Rocklea. These were purchased to operate the Lander series of trains, The Inlander, The Midlander, The Sunlander and The Westlander entering service between 1953 and 1955.

The original order of 99 cars was for:

- 8 x MPC class power generation vans
- 8 x MMV class mail vans
- 14 x MBC class luggage vans
- 6 x MDC class dining cars
- 10 x MAL class first class sitting cars (36 seats)
- 14 x MBL class second class sitting cars (52 seats)
- 3 x MCL class composite sitting cars (18 first-class, 24 second-class seats)
- 15 x MAS class first class sleeping cars (14 berths)
- 15 x MBS class second class sleeping cars (24 berths)
- 6 x MCS class composite sleeping cars (8 first-class, 9 second-class berths)

In 2007 as well as 2010, Queensland Rail decided that the 80 remaining M-series carriages would have to be removed from service by December 2013. With the replacement of The Sunlander by the Spirit of Queensland, the M-series carriages were retired in December 2014.

=== Preservation and Re-Use ===
The known ownership/location of the remaining M series lander cars is as follows:

Allocated to Ipswich Workshops Rail Museum:

- MAS 1492 - First Class Twinette Sleeper
- MBL 1513 - Economy Class Sitter
- MCDL 1518 - Lounge Car (former "Canecutters Bar")

Allocated to DownsSteam Tourist Railway & Museum:

- MAS 1494 - First Class Twinette Sleeper
- MAS 1496 - First Class Twinette Sleeper (last noted as "for sale")
- MAS 1500 - First Class Twinette Sleeper (last noted as "no longer on site")
- MAS 1501 - First Class Twinette Sleeper (last noted as "no longer on site")
- MBC 1449 - Baggage Car (ex-Sunlander consist)
- MBL 1506 - Economy Class Sitting Car
- MBLM 1526 - Lounge Car (former "Daintree Lounge")
- MBS 1483 - Economy Triple Berth Sleeper (last noted as "for sale")
- MBSC 1486 - Staff Car
- MCC 1503 - Club Car (former "Tropics Club Car")
- MCS 1466 - Composite First/Economy Sleeper
- MDC 1516 - Dining Car

Allocated to Queensland Pioneer Steam Railway at Swanbank:

- Sleeping car MAS 1540 (the final M Car) (Moved to Mitchell in 2019)
- Power car MPCC 1437 (Ex Westlander)
- Dining car MDC 1461 (Ex Sunlander)
- Bar-diner MCD 1528
- Tropics club car 1502 (Ex Sunlander, still in its 1990s configuration)
- Combined sleeper-diner "The Stockmans bar" MBSL 1476 (Ex "The Spirit of the Outback")
- MXX 1480

Four of these cars have undergone work to return them to traffic as the Queensland Pioneer Steam Railway Dinner Train, which runs over 7 km of scenic railway track at Ipswich, and sport the original blue and white livery they first wore in 1953.

The Q Train, based at The Bellarine Railway, have obtained carriages for the purpose of their restaurant train.

- MBL 1509: Converted to a boutique First Class Dining Car A, seating 14 people. (Ex "The Spirit of the Outback")
- First class sleeper MAS 1487: Converted to a Q Class combined Dining and Bar Car, seating 28 people.
- Economy class sleeper MBS 1474: Converted to a Q Class Dining Car, seating 44 people. (Ex Sunlander)
- Staff car MSC 1469 : Converted to a boutique First Class Dining Car B, seating 14 people. (Ex Sunlander)
- Club Car MCC 1521: Club Loco – Bar Car. (Ex "The Spirit of the Outback")
- Kitchen car MSD 1460 - converted to a full commercial kitchen with servery and pantry.
- Power car MPCC 1430 (Ex Inlander)
- Dining car MDC 1461 (Ex Sunlander)
- Dining car MBSC 1533 (Ex "The Spirit of the Outback")
- Baggage Car MBC 1454 (Ex Westlander)
- Baggage Car MBC 1459 (Ex Sunlander)
- Economy Class Sitter MLB 1512 (Ex Westlander)

Gayndah Heritage Railway

- Guards Van MMV 1439,
- Sleeping car MAS 1536,
- Club Car MCC 1519
- Dining Car MDC 1462

==== Other Carriages Preserved ====
- Economy class sleeper MBS 1473 has been preserved at Cecil Plains railway museum, located at the former railway station..
- Economy class sleeper MBSC 1482 has been preserved at Herberton, located at the former railway station
- Baggage Car MBC 1458 (Ex Spirit of the Outback). Location unknown
- First class sleeper MAS 1540 is located next to Mitchell Railway station. Exchanged for with Steam locomotive 761 by QPSR (Story can be found here)
- Club car "Captain Starlight Lounge" MCC 1520 (formerly on the Spirit of the Outback) is currently at the Macgregor Forecourt in The University of Queensland, formerly home to the Yumantra restaurant

== L Series Carriage Stock ==
L series
- In service: 1981–present
- Manufacturer: Commonwealth Engineering
- Built at: Rocklea
- Constructed: 1981–1985
- Number built: 30
- Operators: Queensland Rail

Specifications
- Track gauge: 1,067 mm (3 ft 6 in)

Between October 1981 and October 1985, Comeng built a further 30 carriages. These were built out of stainless steel.

The original order was for 5 x LBL class second class sitting cars (48 seats).

Subsequent orders added an additional:

- 5 x LAL class first class sitting cars (36 seats)
- 5 x LBL class second class sitting cars (48 seats)
- 10 x LAR class roomette sleeping cars (14 berths)
- 5 x LDC dining cars

In 2007 as well as 2010, Queensland Rail projected that the 30 remaining L series carriages could operate for a further 15 years, pending refurbishment. In July 2014, tenders were called to reconfigure 11 L series carriages. With The Sunlander withdrawn, this allowed The Inlander, Spirit of the Outback and The Westlander to be converted to L series stock.
