= The Sunlander =

Former passenger train service in Australia

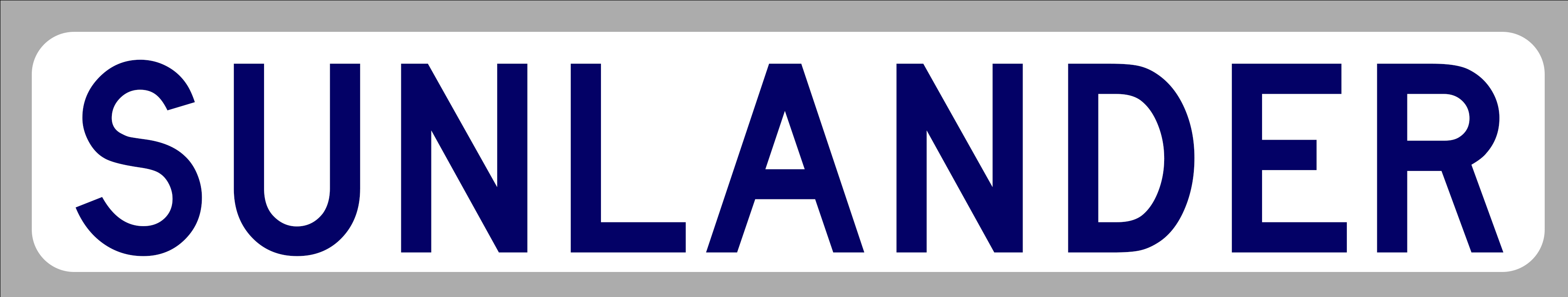
- Depiction of the "Sunlander" locomotive headboard

Overview
- Service type: Passenger train
- Status: Retired
- Predecessor: Sunshine Express
- First service: 4 June 1953
- Last service: 31 December 2014
- Successor: Spirit of Queensland
- Former operator: Queensland Rail

Route
- Termini: Brisbane; Cairns
- Distance travelled: 1,681 kilometres (1,045 mi)
- Average journey time: 45 hours (Original); 31 hours (Final)
- Line used: North Coast

Technical
- Rolling stock: M series L series
- Track gauge: 1,067 mm (3 ft 6 in)

The Sunlander was a long distance passenger rail service operated by Queensland Rail on the North Coast line between Brisbane and Cairns in Queensland between June 1953 and December 2014. It has been replaced by the Spirit of Queensland.

== History ==
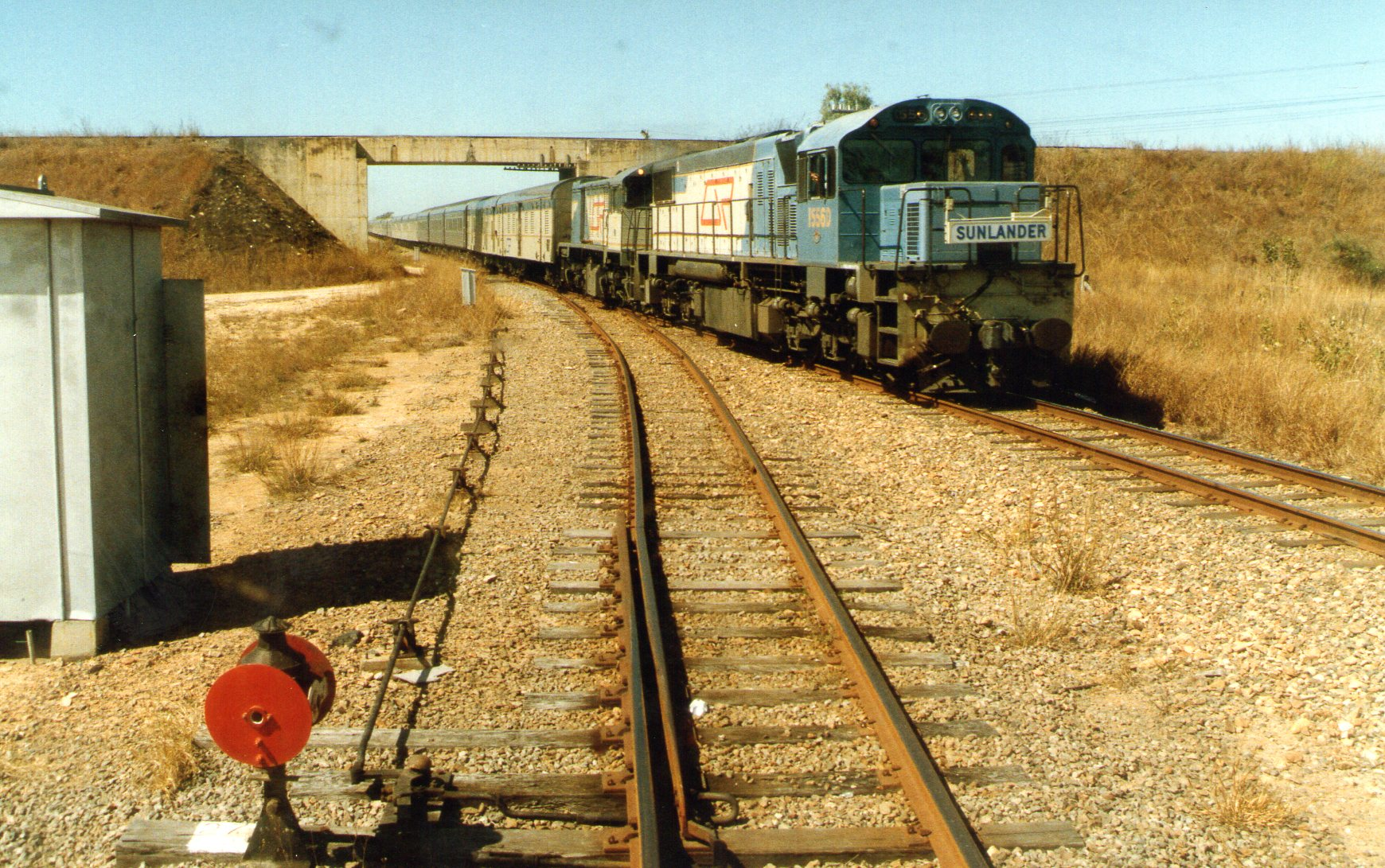
1556 and a 1720 class haul the northbound Sunlander through Yabulu in 1991

Lounge car of The Sunlander in 1978

From December 1924, when the North Coast line was completed, a steam hauled non air-conditioned train provided the service.

In 1935, a new train named the Sunshine Express was introduced. This train of wooden carriages featured varnished timber internal panelling made from natural Queensland timbers. Comforts for that period included electric fans, electric lighting, and leather upholstered seating. Accommodation included sleeping berths for first and second class passengers and seating only carriages.

In December 1949, Queensland Railways placed an order with Commonwealth Engineering for eight M series carriage sets totalling 99 carriages to introduce air-conditioned rolling stock to its long distance services. In addition QR's own North Ipswich Railway Workshops built a train. The carriages were designed to travel to all parts of the system with a maximum axle load of nine tons, which was a challenge for the dining cars. New features included showers in the sleeping cars, roomettes in first class and head end power cars, especially necessary where trains may be delayed by floods or other events, as was often the case.

The Sunlander commenced service on 4 June 1953, replacing the Sunshine Express. This new air conditioned train was hauled by a diesel locomotive and by eliminating steam locomotive servicing stops, the transit time to Cairns was reduced from 45 to 41¼ hours. By the time it ceased in December 2014, the time had been cut to 31 hours with many infrastructure upgrades having taken place.

As further rolling stock was delivered, a second weekly service commenced on 30 November 1953 building up to five on 9 December 1955. The much delayed Ipswich built set was commissioned on 10 May 1961, allowing the service to build up to six services per week, this was reduced back to five on 8 November 1970 to release stock for the Capricornian.

Promotional image of the Sunlander in North Queensland

Queenslander Class branding

This was further reduced when the luxury Queenslander commenced operating on the Brisbane to Cairns route. On 29 February 1992, a motorail service was introduced. The Queenslander was later merged in with the Sunlander to offer "Queenslander Class" accommodation on selected services.

In 2014, the service was gradually replaced by the Spirit of Queensland using extra Diesel Tilt Trains. From 13 October 2014, the number of weekly services was reduced from three to one, with the last service departing Cairns on 31 December 2014.

== Route ==
The route followed the North Coast line from Brisbane in the sub tropical region of South East Queensland through to Cairns the tropical north region. The train travelled the coastal strip between the beaches and the Great Dividing Range passing diverse country including the Glasshouse Mountains, the sugar cane country of North Queensland and the tropics beyond Townsville.

== Rolling stock ==
The Sunlander was operated by M series carriage stock. From the early 1980s this was supplemented by L series stock.

Motive power was provided by diesel locomotives throughout until the North Coast line was electrified in 1989 with the 3900 class operating the service south of Rockhampton. Following the cessation of electric locomotive working on the North Coast line, The Sunlander was again diesel hauled throughout.

Following the reorganisation of Queensland Rail's freight operations in preparation for privatisation, the locomotives were provided by QR National. On 1 July 2014, this function was taken over by Queensland Rail.

== Passenger facilities ==
Facilities and accommodation onboard remained generally consistent throughout the history of the train, although some changes were made over time with the addition and removal of carriages. Facilities and accommodation after the refurbishment of carriages in the 1990s featured:

- First Class Roomette Sleepers
- First Class Twinette Sleepers
- Economy Class Triple Berth Sleepers
- Waterways Restaurant Car
- Macrossan Lounge Car
- Tropics Club Car
- Sitting Cars

From 2003 through to the last service, the Sunlander service was merged with the Queenslander train and provided two levels of "First Class" accommodation on selected trains.

Queenslander Class featured a premium First Class experience, with premium toiletries packs, bath robes, premium bedding and meals included, made up with carriage stock formerly used on the Queenslander service. Facilities and accommodation of Queenslander Class were as follows:

- First Class Twinette Sleepers
- Coral Cay Restaurant Car
- Lounge Car

Facilities and accommodation on the Sunlander portion of the train from 2003 onwards were as follows:

- First Class Roomette Sleepers
- First Class Twinette Sleepers
- Economy Class Triple Sleepers
- Food Bar Car
- Tropics Club Car
- Sitting Cars

== Preservation ==
With the widespread retirement of the M Series carriages, several carriages allocated to the Sunlander have been preserved.

The Queensland Pioneer Steam Railway at Swanbank were gifted six M-class cars following their retirement. Of those, three had been formerly used on The Sunlander:

- Sleeping car MAS 1540 (the final M car)
- Dining car MDC 1461
- Tropics club car 1502 (in its 1990s configuration)

Four of the M-class cars (including two of those listed above) have now undergone work to return them to traffic as the Queensland Pioneer Dinner train over the seven kilometres scenic railway outside Ipswich, and are sporting the blue and white livery they first wore in 1953. These cars had their first trip as the Queensland Pioneer Dinner Train on 22 July 2017.

The Q Train is a fine dining restaurant on the Bellarine Peninsula in Victoria. It operates on the Bellarine Railway. They acquired a large number of Sunlander coaches and renovated them to become Australia's only dedicated fine-dining rail experience.
