= Capricornian =

Australian passenger train

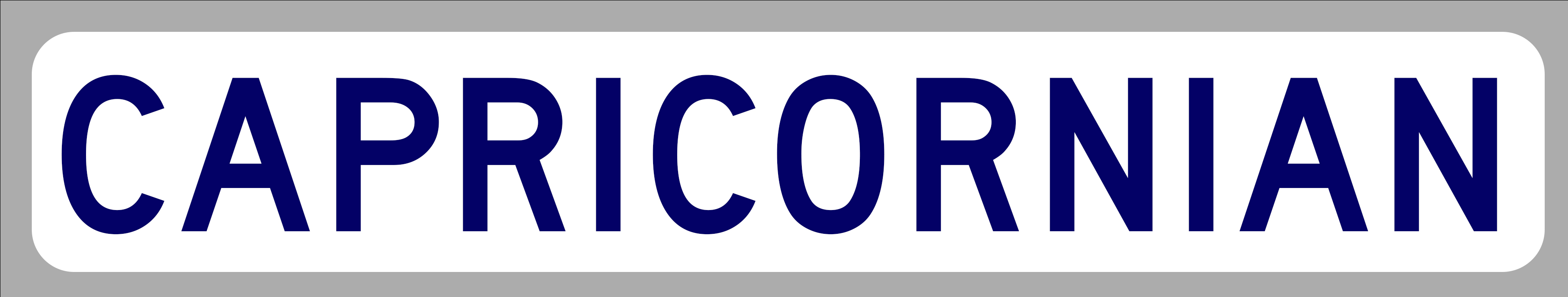
- Depiction of the Capricornian locomotive headboard
- Stock type: Loco Hauled Passenger Train
- Entered service: 1970
- Retired: 1993
- Predecessor: Rockhampton Mail
- Successor: Spirit of the Outback
- Operators: QR Traveltrain
- Lines served: North Coast Line

Specifications
- Track gauge: 1067mm

The Capricornian was a passenger train that operated in Queensland, Australia between 1970 and 1993. It travelled on the North Coast line between Brisbane and Rockhampton.

== History ==
When the Sunlander air-conditioned express train to Cairns was introduced in 1953, the Rockhampton Mail retained its wooden carriages, and a surcharge and booking restrictions deterred Rockhampton bound travelers from using the air-conditioned services. Following a rearrangement of the Sunlander consists and the construction of further air-conditioned cars, the Capricornian replaced the Rockhampton Mail in 1970, taking 14.25 hours for the overnight trip and running 5 times per week.

By 1988, the transit time was 13 hours 55 minutes, reduced to 12 hours 35 minutes following the extensive upgrading of the North Coast line (NCL) in 1989. However, the pending electrification of the NCL led to an announcement that the Capricornian would be eliminated once the Spirit of Capricorn service was introduced. Vehement protests about the loss of the overnight sleeper service went all the way to Queensland Premier, Mike Ahern and Prime Minister, Bob Hawke This resulted in the retention of the train on Thursday, Friday and Sunday nights.

The Capricornian was eventually merged with the Rockhampton - Winton Midlander Train and the merged service was renamed the Spirit of the Outback in November 1993, which now runs from Brisbane to Longreach with a connecting coach service to Winton, largely to cater for the 'rail cruising' tourism market.

== On board ==
The Capricornian used standard Queensland Rail M Series and L Series steel rolling stock. As at 1990, the service featured the following facilities and accommodation:

- First Class Roomette Sleepers
- First Class Twinette Sleepers
- Economy Class Triple Berth Sleepers
- Club Car
- Sitting Cars

== See also ==
- Rail transport in Queensland
