= Queensland Railways 1170 class =

Class of Australian diesel locomotives

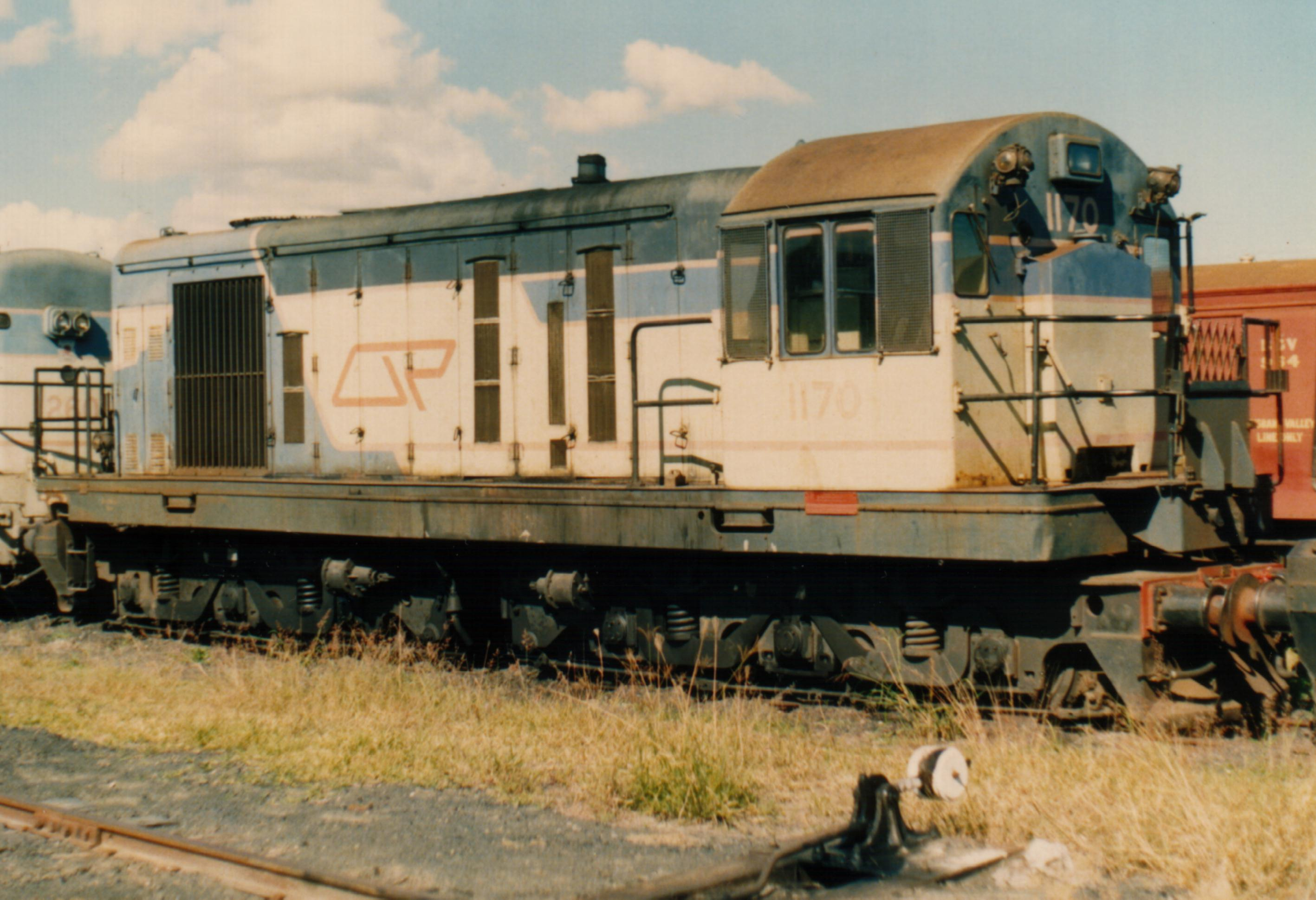
- 1170 at Redbank Railway Workshops in August 1988
Type and origin
- Power type: Diesel-electric
- Builder: Walkers Limited, Maryborough
- Model: GE Transportation U-67T
- Build date: 1955–1958
- Total produced: 12
Specifications
- Configuration
  - UIC: A1A-A1A
- Gauge: 1,067 mm (3 ft 6 in)
- Length: 12.65 m (41 ft 6 in)
- Loco weight: 60 t (59 long tons; 66 short tons)
- Fuel type: Diesel
- Prime mover: Cooper Bessemer FWL6T
- Generator: General Electric EE 828A
- Traction motors: General Electric 756
Performance figures
- Maximum speed: 80 km/h (50 mph)
- Power output: 477 kW (640 hp)
- Tractive effort: 122 kN (27,000 lbf)
Career
- Operators: Queensland Railways
- Number in class: 12
- Numbers: 1170-1181
- First run: 18 January 1956
- Last run: 31 March 1989
- Preserved: 1170, 1172, 1177, 1179, 1181
- Disposition: 5 preserved, 7 scrapped

The 1170 class were a class of diesel locomotive built by Walkers Limited, Maryborough for Queensland Railways between 1956 and 1958.

== History ==
The 1170 class were intended as a replacement for the PB15 class steam locomotives on branch lines. They were built by Walkers Limited in Maryborough under licence from GE Transportation.

When the class leader entered service in January 1956 it was numbered 1270, so the class would have been called the 1270 class (not to be confused with the later 1270 class), but later that year it was renumbered as 1500, and subsequent locomotives would be numbered 1501-1511. In 1965 the locomotives were renumbered 1170-1181, and for the rest of their lives they were known as the 1170 class.

The class were popularly known as 'Paw Paws' after a racehorse, which in turn was named after a character in a contemporary cartoon strip.

They spent most of their working lives based at Townsville but in later years were used around Brisbane and the southern region of the state as shunters. The first unit was withdrawn in 1984 with the final two withdrawn in 1989.

Five units have been preserved, including class leader 1170 retained by the Queensland Rail Heritage Division at North Ipswich. 1181, formerly located at Herberton Railway Museum, is now located at Southern Downs Steam Railway, Warwick waiting an audit and evaluation before being considered for full restoration to operational service.

== Status table ==
Image	1500 class number	1270 class number	1170 class number	Serial number	In service	Withdrawn	Scrapped	Notes
	1500	1270	1170	558	18 January 1956	18 July 1988		Preserved, Queensland Rail Heritage Fleet, North Ipswich
	1501	1271	1171	559	1 June 1956	4 July 1988	December 1990	
	1502	1272	1172	560	4 August 1956	31 March 1989		Preserved, privately owned. Now operational at Bell Railway Station
	1503	1273	1173	561	27 September 1956	13 March 1986	December 1989	
	1504	1274	1174	562	15 March 1957	3 March 1988	January 1991	
	1505	1275	1175	563	12 April 1957	20 February 1984	January 1991	
	1506	1276	1176	564	31 May 1957	11 September 1987	December 1989	
	1507	1277	1177	565	28 June 1957	25 February 1989	2018?	Formerly Preserved, stripped for parts for 1172 and 1179. Remaining shell scrapped.
	1508	1278	1178	566	26 October 1957	11 July 1988	January 1991	
	1509	1279	1179	567	4 December 1957	25 July 1988		Preserved, Rosewood Railway Museum
	1510	1280	1180	568	14 March 1958	30 September 1987	January 1991	
	1511	1281	1181	569	25 May 1958	22 March 1989		Preserved, Herberton Railway Museum, carries number 1181
