= Tilt Train =

High-speed tilting train service in Australia

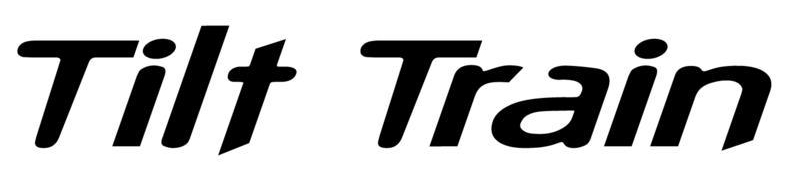

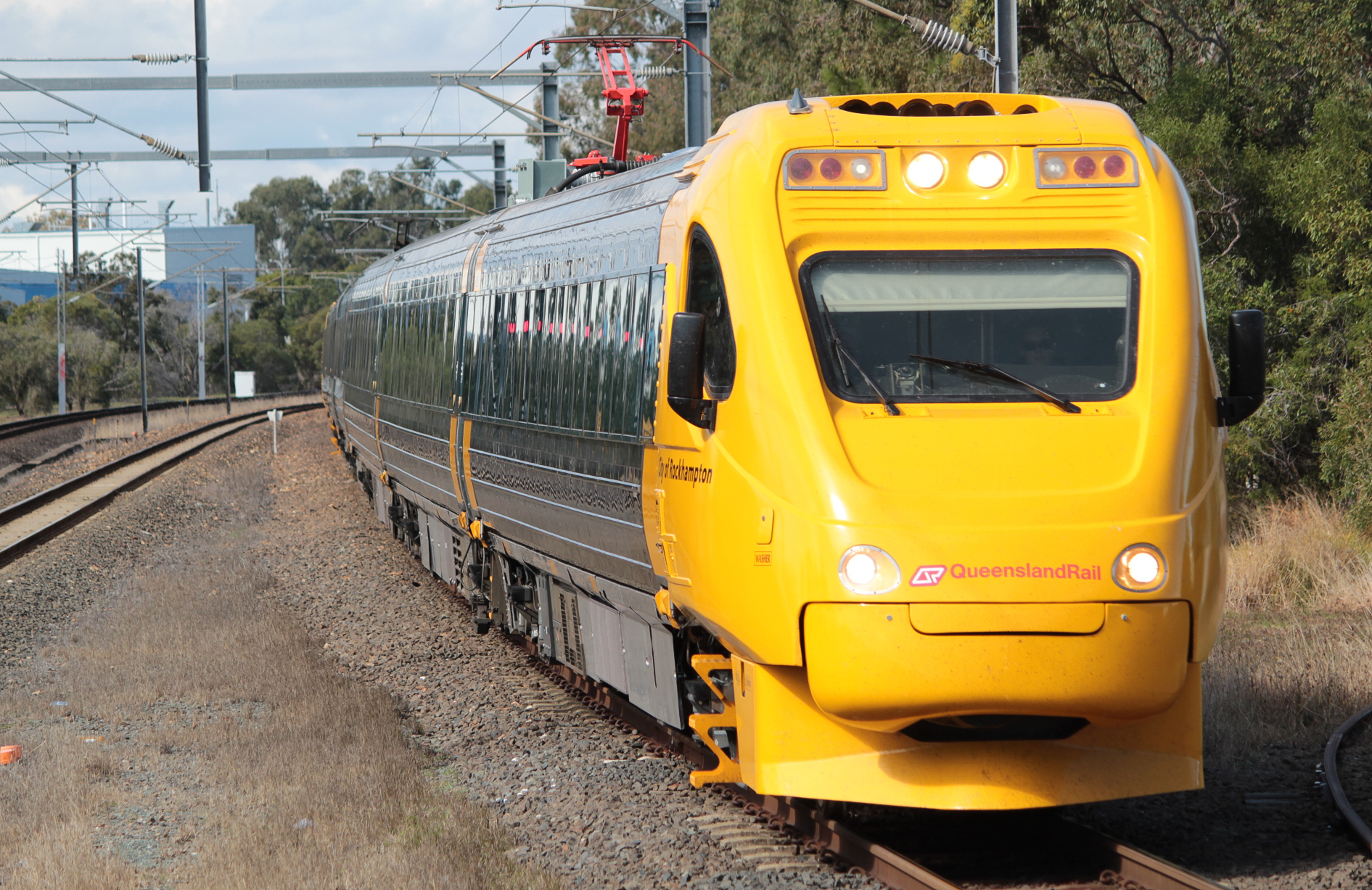

Overview
- Service type: Passenger
- Current operator: Queensland Rail

Route
- Termini: Brisbane: Bundaberg; Rockhampton
- Line used: North Coast

Technical
- Rolling stock: Electric Tilt Train
- Track gauge: 1,067 mm (3 ft 6 in)
- Electrification: 25 kV 50 Hz AC from overhead catenary
- Operating speed: 160 km/h (100 mph)

Tilt Train is the brand name for the higher-speed tilting train service operated by Queensland Rail. The service runs on the North Coast line from Brisbane to Bundaberg and Rockhampton, serving the intermediate towns of Gympie, Maryborough and Gladstone. The service operates using Electric Tilt Train rolling stock.

== History ==
On 6 November 1998, Australia's first pair of tilting trains entered service between Brisbane and Rockhampton. Simply marketed as the Tilt Train, the journey time was reduced from nine hours to seven hours. In July 1999, a second daily service was introduced between Brisbane and Bundaberg. In May 2003, the Tilt Train service completely replaced the Spirit of Capricorn service.

== Rolling stock ==
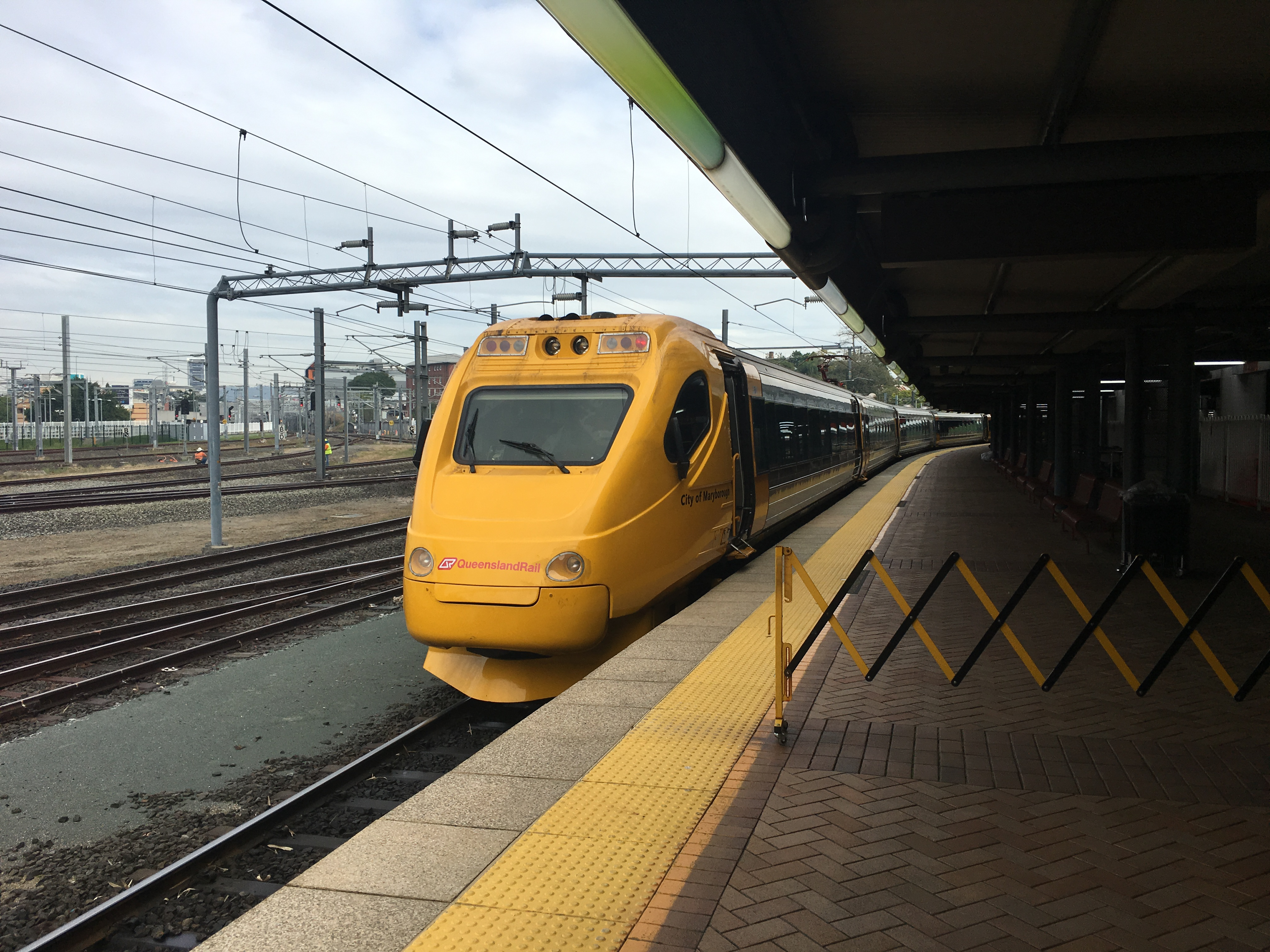
Tilt Train at Roma Street

With a top service speed of 160 km/h (100 mph) and the ability to tilt five degrees in each direction, the Electric Tilt Train is one of the fastest trains in Australia. The train has a similar maximum allowed speed to the V/Line VLocity, the Transwa Prospector railcar and the New South Wales XPT. In May 1999, the train achieved a top speed of 210 kilometres per hour (130 mph) under test conditions.

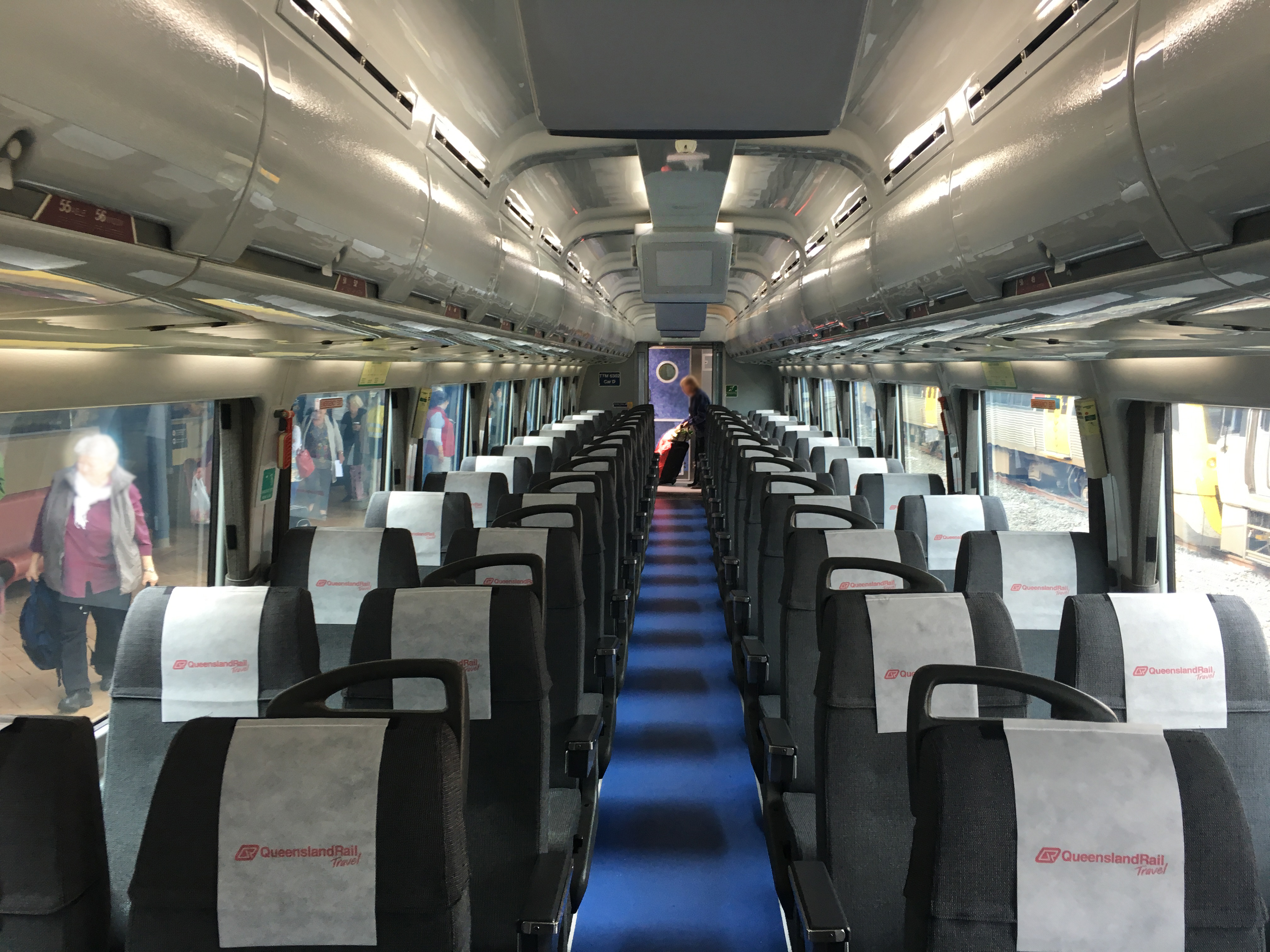
Economy Class interior

The Electric Tilt Train features 2×2 Economy class seating and 1×2 Business class seating. A trolley service is provided on afternoon services. There are two serveries onboard providing food and beverages which are consumed at your seat. Wi-Fi internet access was introduced in 2016.

== Awards ==
In 2009 as part of the Q150 celebrations, the Tilt Train was announced as one of the Q150 Icons of Queensland for its role as an iconic "innovation and invention".

== See also ==
- High-speed rail in Australia
