= Spirit of the Outback =

Passenger rail service in Queensland, Australia

Overview
- Service type: Passenger
- Predecessor: Capricornian; The Midlander
- First service: November 1993
- Current operator: Queensland Rail
- Ridership: 18,216 (2010–11)

Route
- Termini: Brisbane (Roma Street); Longreach
- Distance travelled: 1,325 kilometres (823 mi)
- Average journey time: 26 hours
- Service frequency: Twice per week
- Lines used: North Coast; Central Western

Technical
- Track gauge: 1,067 mm (3 ft 6 in)

The Spirit of the Outback is a long-distance passenger rail service in Queensland, Australia, operated by Queensland Rail's Traveltrain division. It operates between Brisbane and Longreach.

== History ==
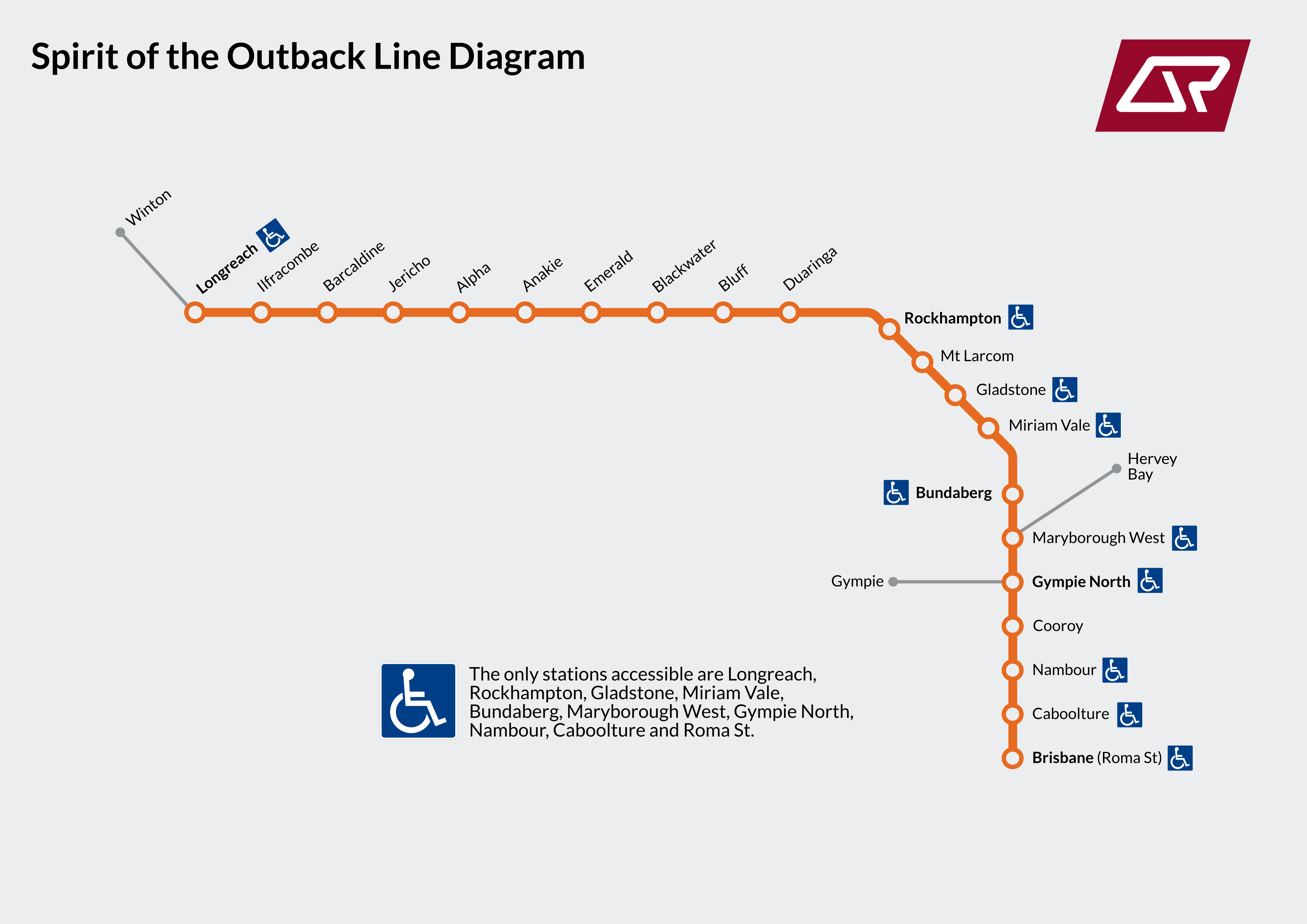
Route diagram of the Spirit of the Outback.

The service commenced in November 1993 by combining the former Capricornian and Midlander trains.

In January 2015, the service was upgraded with refurbished L series carriages. At this time the M series carriages and Motorail services were also withdrawn. While the Tuckerbox was retained, the Stockman's Bar and Captain Starlight Lounge (which were the original lounge cars) were withdrawn and replaced with the Shearer's Rest Lounge.

In June 2021, the Queensland government announced $1 million for a business case to build replacement carriages for The Westlander, The Inlander and Spirit of the Outback long-distance services with manufacturing to be set in Queensland.

== Rolling stock ==
The Spirit of the Outback has two classes of travel:

- Economy, with a seat.
- Sleepers, including:
  - 'Single Sleeper', with a seat that converts into a bed
  - 'Twin Sleeper', with two seats that convert into two beds

== Incident ==
On 18 November 2000, 3W56 Longreach-bound Spirit of the Outback came within 50 metres of colliding head-on with a Gladstone-bound coal train. The close call occurred 15 kilometres west of Dingo when the coal train proceeded through a red signal and entered the same section of track the Spirit of the Outback was travelling on. At the time of the incident, there were fifty passengers on board the Spirit of the Outback. When the crew of the coal train realised the danger, they applied their emergency brakes and contacted the crew of the Spirit of the Outback who also applied their emergency brakes. Both trains were able to stop in time before a head on collision occurred. The Spirit of the Outback came to a stop first and the drivers vacated the lead locomotive as the coal train approached. There was much criticism that the drivers had abandoned the passengers with no warning to brace for an impending impact. The Spirit of the Outback was hauled back to Dingo where passengers were permitted to disembark and were given complimentary tea and coffee. The Spirit of the Outback was delayed for two and a half hours due to the incident.

An investigation chaired by Queensland Transport concluded on 8 December 2000, which confirmed the crew of the Gladstone-bound coal train were at fault because they had passed a signal at danger and as a result were facing disciplinary action. A Queensland Rail spokesperson said the two drivers, who had excellent driving records prior to the incident, would undergo extensive re-training before being allowed to return to driving duties. The spokesperson also said the staff on board the Spirit of the Outback had acted properly by not discussing the severity of the incident with passengers at the time.

== See also ==
- Rail transport in Australia
