= Interurban multiple unit =

Queensland Rail EMU interurban trainsets

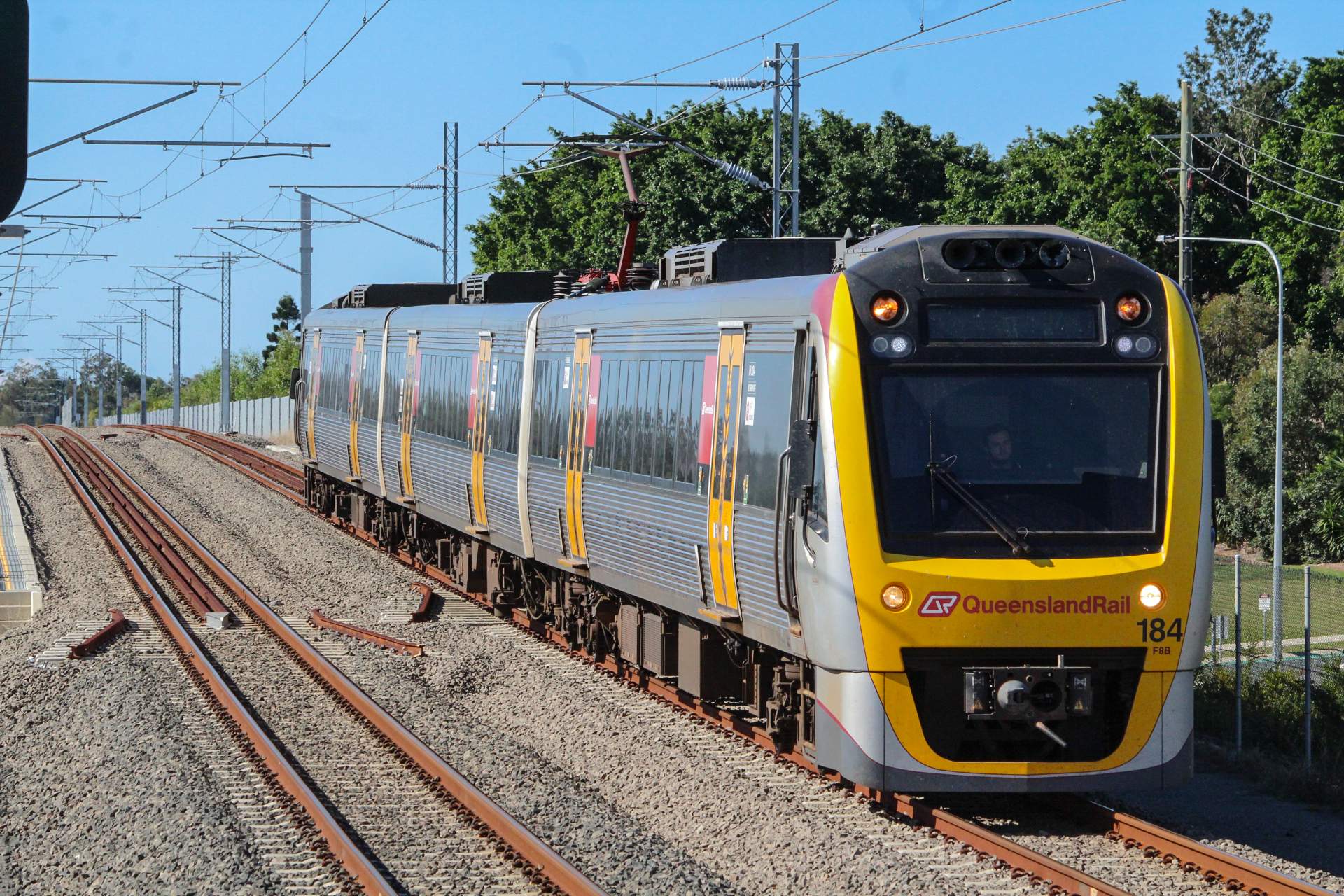
- IMU 184 arriving Murrumba Downs station

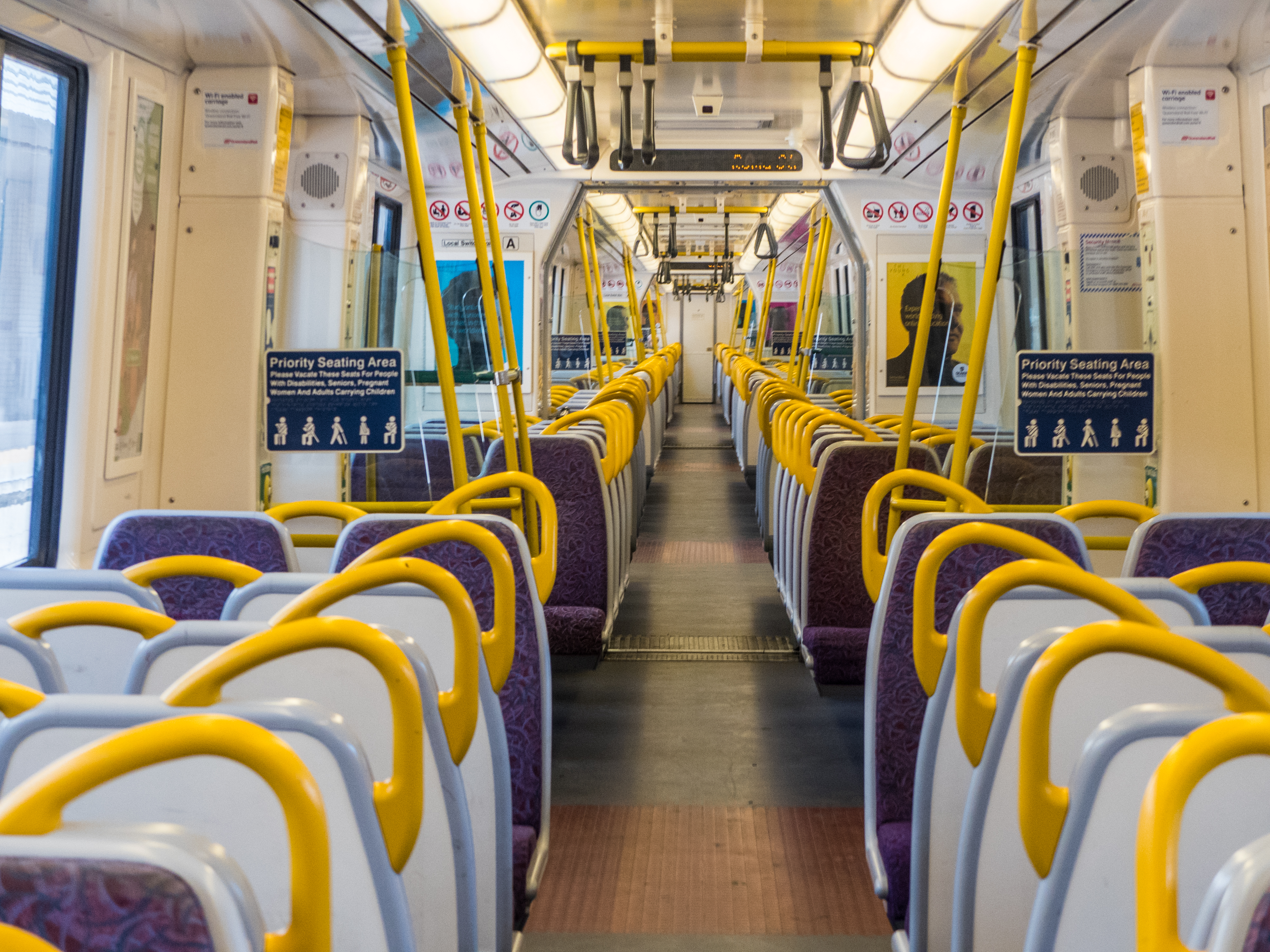
- Interior of an IMU 160
- Manufacturers: Walkers Limited (100 and 120); Downer EDI Rail/Bombardier (160)
- Built at: Maryborough
- Constructed: 1996–1997 (100); 2001–2002 (120); 2007–2011 (160)
- Number built: 30 carriages (100); 12 carriages (120); 84 carriages (160)
- Formation: 3-car sets
- Fleet numbers: 101–110 (100); 121–124 (120); 161–188 (160)
- Operator: Queensland Rail

Specifications
- Train length: 72.40 m (237 ft 6 in) (100 & 120); 72.42 m (237 ft 7 in) (160)
- Car length: 24.21 m (79 ft 5 in) (160 – end cars); 24.00 m (78 ft 9 in) (160 – intermediate cars)
- Width: 2.7 m (8 ft 10 in)
- Height: 3.9 m (12 ft 10 in)
- Maximum speed: 140 km/h (87 mph) (100 & 120); 130 km/h (81 mph) (160)
- Weight: 131.8 t (129.7 long tons; 145.3 short tons) (100); 130.4 t (128.3 long tons; 143.7 short tons) (120); 128.2 t (126.2 long tons; 141.3 short tons) (160)
- Traction system: 100: ABB MICAS-S2 GTO–VVVF; 120 and 160: Bombardier MITRAC IGBT–VVVF
- Traction motors: 8 × 180 kW (240 hp) 3-phase AC induction motor
- Power output: 1.44 MW (1,930 hp)
- Electric system: 25 kV 50 Hz AC (nominal) from overhead catenary
- Current collection: Pantograph
- UIC classification: Bo′Bo′+Bo′Bo′+2′2′ (100); Bo′Bo′+2′2′+Bo′Bo′ (120/160)
- Braking systems: Mix of electro-pneumatic and regenerative braking
- Coupling system: Scharfenberg Type 10
- Multiple working: Within type; With SMU260 (160 only)
- Track gauge: 1,067 mm (3 ft 6 in)

The Interurban multiple units (IMU) are a class of electric multiple units manufactured by Walkers Limited/Downer EDI Rail, Maryborough for Queensland Rail's Citytrain division between 1996 and 2011. The IMU is divided into three subclasses, units 101–110 as the 100 series, units 121–124 as the 120 series, and units 161–188, as the 160 series.

== Design ==
The Interurban Multiple Units are a long-distance optimised version of the Suburban Multiple Units. Internally, the IMUs differ from the SMUs, being fitted with larger seats, luggage racks and mobility-access toilets. Like most trains in the Citytrain fleet, two three-car IMUs can be coupled to form one six-car unit.

== History ==
=== 100 series ===
To provide rolling stock for the new Gold Coast line to Helensvale, in 1993 a contract for four 100 class units was awarded to Walkers Limited, Maryborough. The 100 were manufactured by Walkers Limited, Maryborough in partnership with ABB. The first four IMU100s, 101 to 104 entered service in 1996 before the opening of the new line. As these were never going to be adequate to operate all services on the line, in July 1995 a further six were ordered. They were delivered in 1997. They feature luggage racks, disabled access toilets, and high-backed cloth seating.

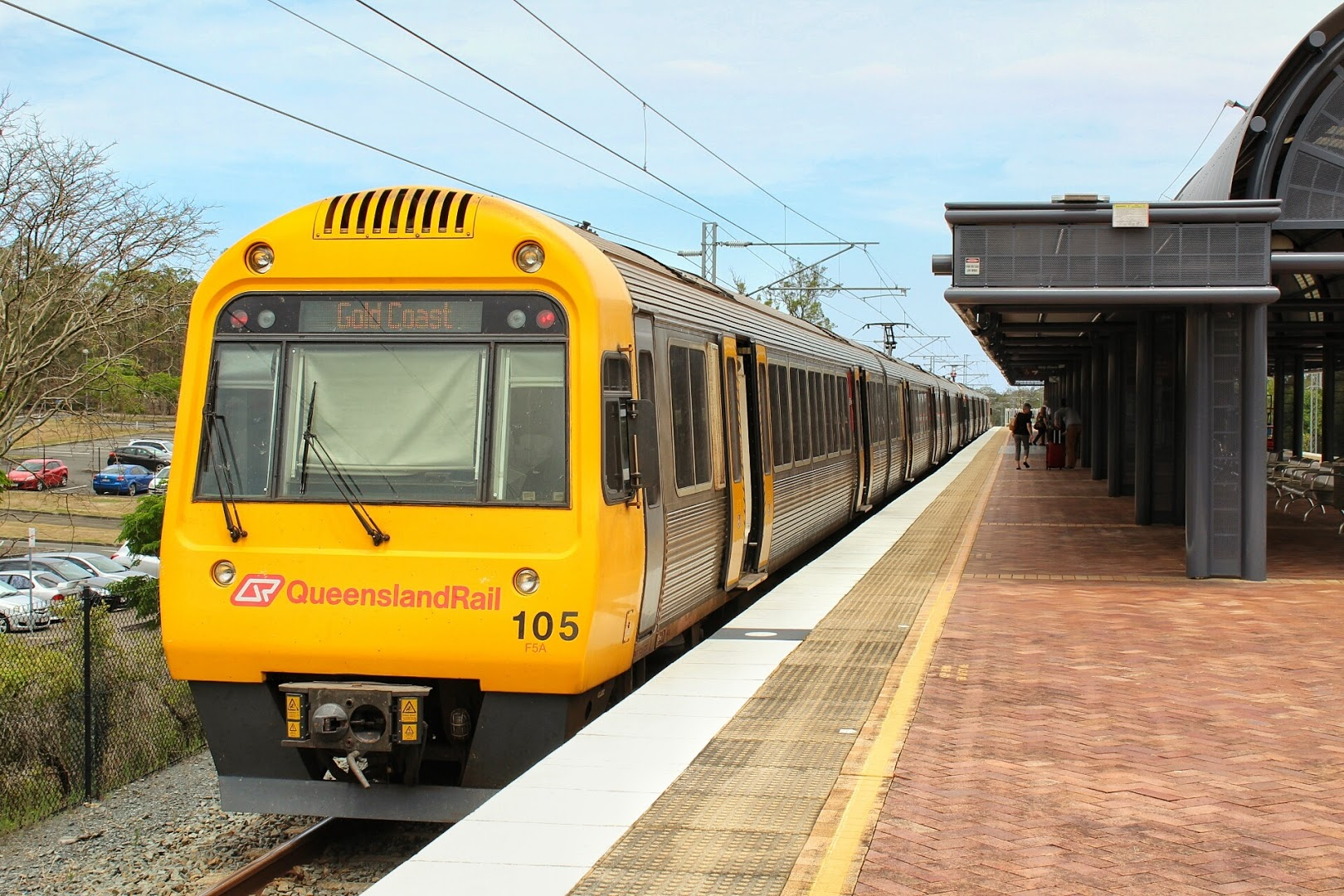
IMU105 at Coomera in December 2016

==== Formation ====
The 100 class consists of three-car sets, which usually operate coupled in pairs as six-car trains.

Car No.	1	2	3	4	5	6
Numbering	IM 8107	IM 6107	IM 5107	IM 8110	IM 6110	IM 5110

=== 120 series ===
In 1999, four 120 series units were ordered for the Airtrain line to Brisbane Airport.

They entered service in 2001, fitted with high-backed seats with a head cushion as an extension as the seat design is based on the SMU 220s, one toilet per unit and luggage racks in different configurations due to the interior design differences to its predecessor. The 100 series and 120 series are interoperable, and used to operate together in revenue service as six-car units, but no longer do so due to electrical and mechanical differences.

The 120 series were the final batch of trains manufactured by Walkers Limited before being absorbed by Downer Group, Maryborough in partnership with ADtranz, which was likewise taken over by Bombardier.

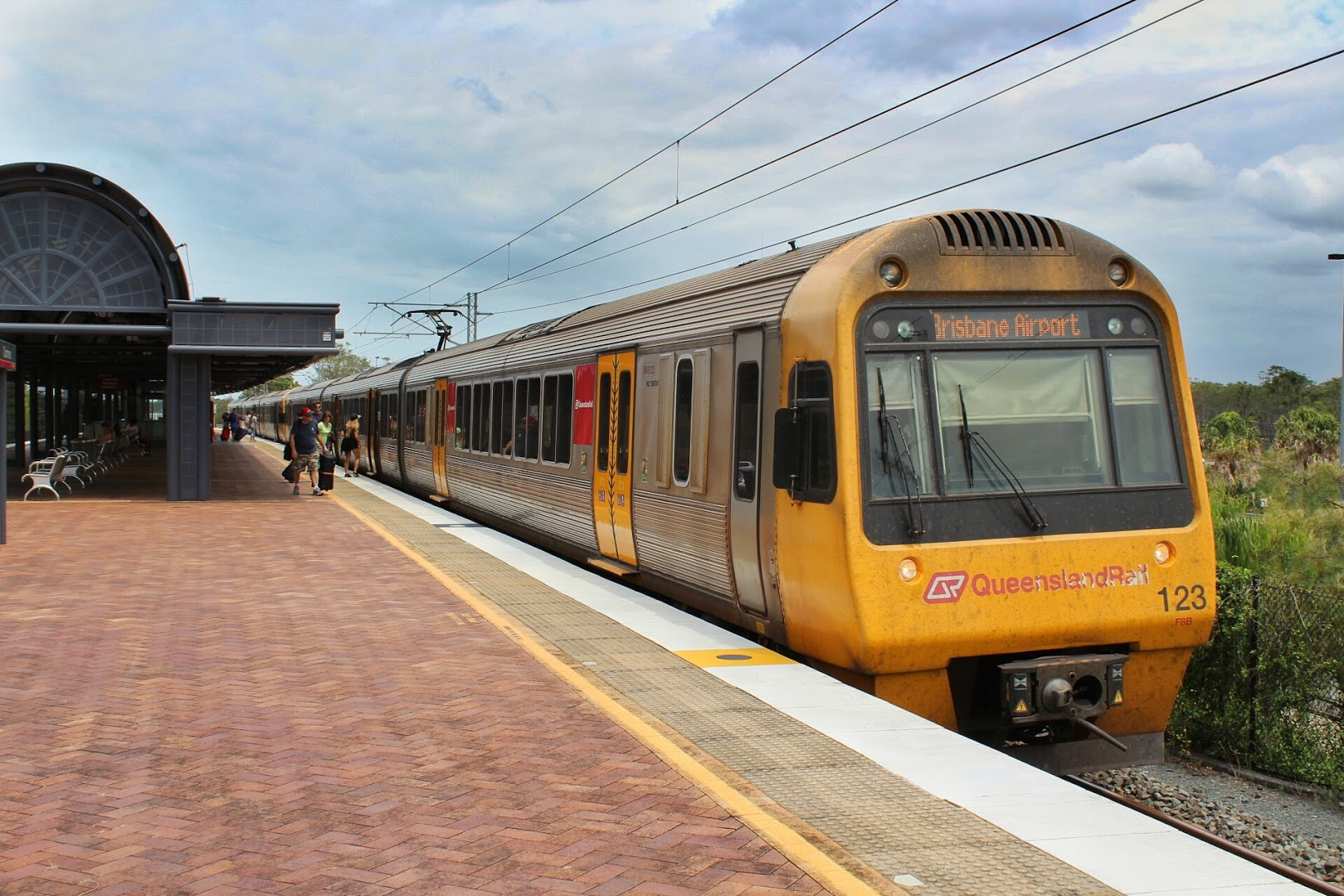
IMU123 at Coomera in December 2016

=== 160 series ===
In 2004, Queensland Rail ordered sixteen 160 series units to provide extra rolling stock in conjunction with the upgrade and duplication of the Gold Coast line. The 160 series were manufactured by Downer EDI Rail, Maryborough in partnership with Bombardier Transportation. These trains are similar in design to the Transperth B-series EMU, V/Line VLocity DMU, and Adelaide Metro 4000 class EMU trains with alterations to the headlights to complement with the rest of the Citytrain fleet. These trains are interoperable with the 260 series Suburban Multiple Units as they have almost identical specifications.

In early 2007, during safety checks, it was discovered that air-conditioning units on the trains were 10 millimetres too wide for the loading gauge.

On 28 May 2007, the first of the new IMUs entered service on the Gold Coast line.

On 31 January 2013, IMU173 derailed at Cleveland station and ran into the station's toilet block, injuring 14. Only minor injuries were reported. The damaged car IM5173 was eventually repaired and returned to service.

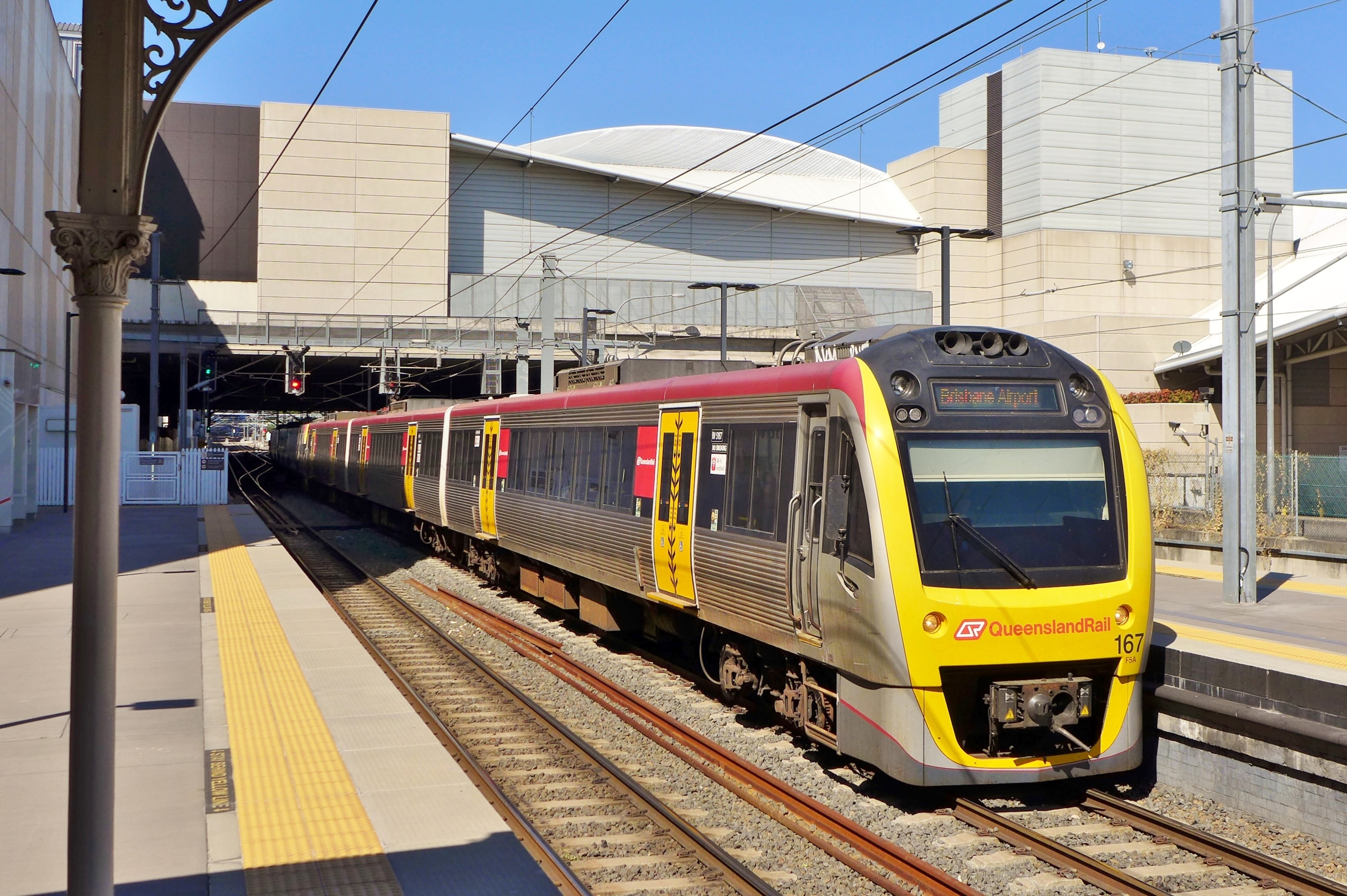
An IMU 160 (IMU167)

==== Refurbishment ====
Since July 2023, the IMU160s have been undergoing a major refurbishment. Twenty-two units have already been completed under this scheme with new vinyl flooring, better Wi-Fi, and the driver B carriage having mostly sideways seating.

==== Formation ====
The 160 class consists of three-car sets, which can operate coupled with another 160 series set or interoperably with a 260 series Suburban Multiple Unit (SMU) set as six-car trains.

Car No.	1	2	3	4	5	6
Class	SMU260 series	SMU260 series	SMU260 series	IMU160 series	IMU160 series	IMU160 series
Designation	Driving motor	Pantograph trailer	Driving motor B	Driving motor	Pantograph trailer	Driving motor B
Numbering	SM 5295	SM 7295	SM 8295	IM 5183	IM 7183	IM 8183

== Gallery ==
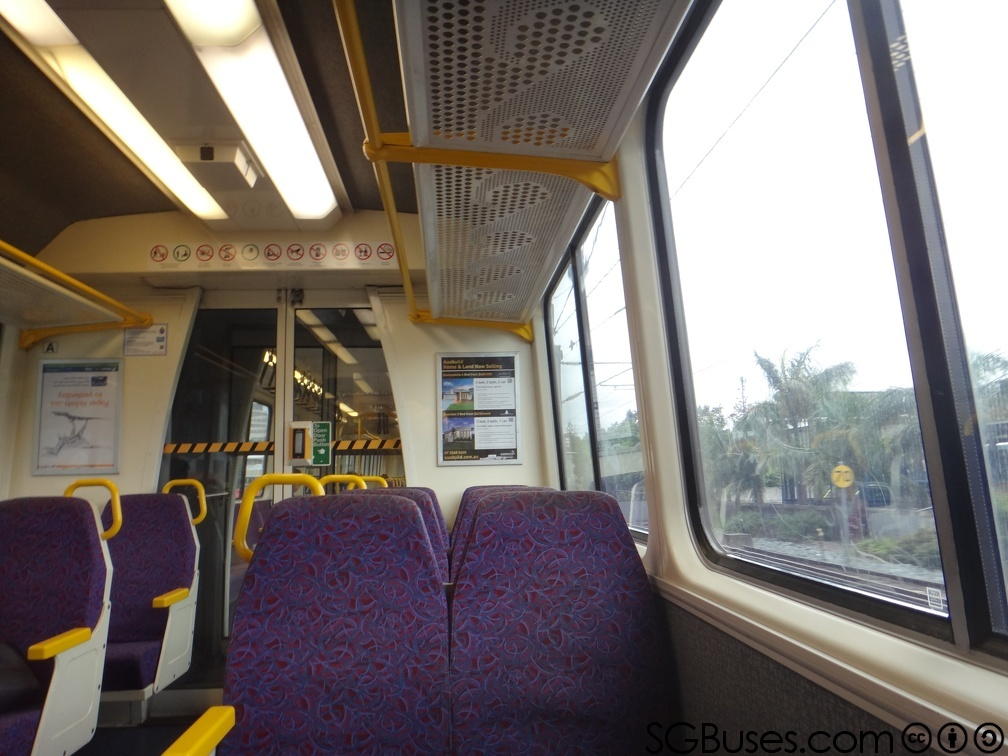
Refurbished IMU 100 interior

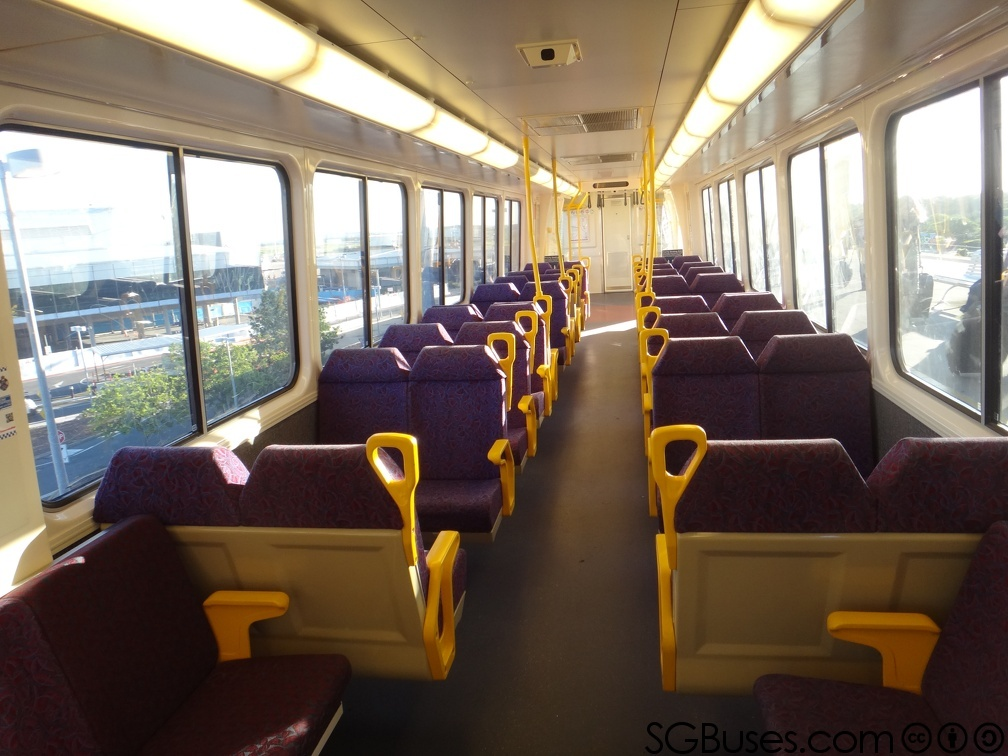
Refurbished IMU 120 interior
