= SX carriages =

Australian type of railway carriage

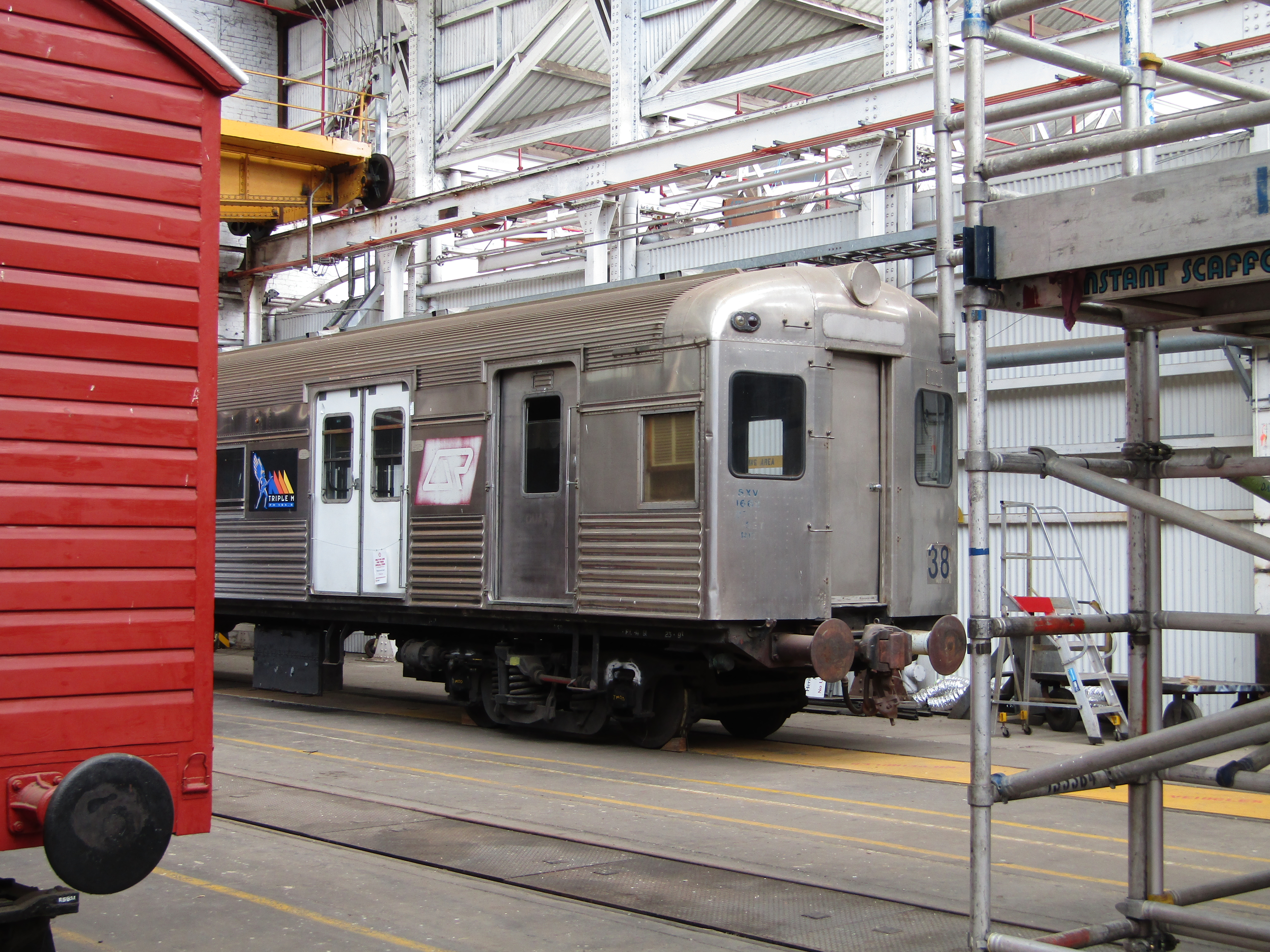
- SXV 1662 from set 38 at Ipswich
- In service: 1961-1999 (Brisbane); 1986 - 1991 (Perth); 1995 - Present (Thailand); 2003 - 2014 (Auckland)
- Manufacturer: Commonwealth Engineering
- Built at: Granville, New South Wales
- Constructed: 1961-62
- Entered service: 1961 (Brisbane); 1986 (Perth); 1995 (Thailand); 2003 (Auckland)
- Capacity: SXC = 139 (52 seated, 87 standing); SXV = 110 (36 seated, 74 standing)
- Operators: Queensland Rail, Zig Zag Railway, Auckland Transport

Specifications
- Car length: 17,555 mm (57 ft 7.1 in)
- Width: 2,667 mm (8 ft 9.0 in)
- Height: 3,718 mm (12 ft 2.4 in)
- Floor height: 1,115 mm (3 ft 7.9 in)
- Maximum speed: 80 km/h (50 mph)
- Weight: 23000 Kgs (50,706 lbs)
- Track gauge: 1,067 mm (3 ft 6 in)

The SX carriages were a type of passenger carriages constructed by Commonwealth Engineering for the Queensland Railways in 1961–1962.

== History ==
The SX carriage stainless steel bodyshells were constructed by Commonwealth Engineering, Granville, with the fitout undertaken at Rocklea between 1961 and 1962. They were built to operate suburban services on the Brisbane rail network. They shared many components with the New South Wales U set carriages.

Initially hauled by steam and later diesel locomotives, provision was made for their conversion to electric multiple units once the network was electrified. Sixteen seven-carriage sets were completed. The conversion never occurred and they were gradually replaced from the 1980s as EMUs and SMUs entered service. The last was withdrawn on 2 December 1999.

To allow extra services to be operated during the 1987 America's Cup yacht regatta in Fremantle, 2 sets (14 cars) were leased to Transperth in October 1986. Initially intended as a short-term deal, they would remain in Perth until returned to Queensland in 1991. Others were exported to the Auckland Regional Council, Ferrocarril de Antofagasta a Bolivia and State Railway of Thailand.

=== Zig Zig Railway - Auckland set ===
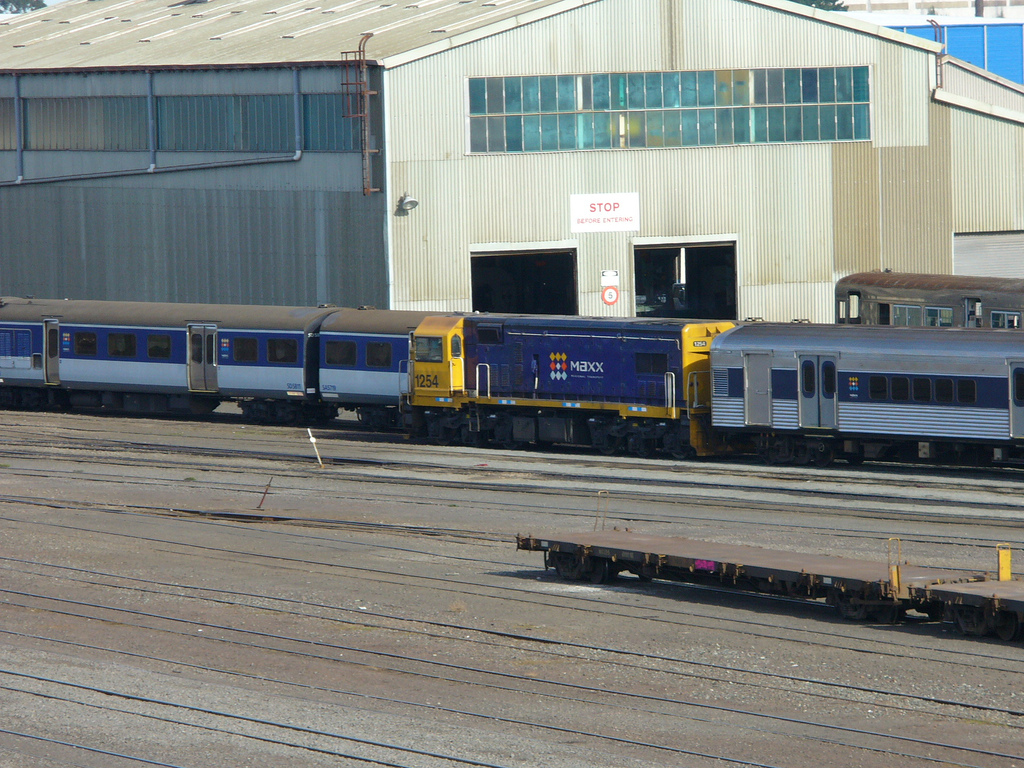
DBR class locomotive 1254 with an SX carriage at Westfield, Auckland on 13 August 2007.

Seven SX carriages were imported to New Zealand in the early 2000s from the Zig Zag Railway in Lithgow, New South Wales, Australia. A set of six were overhauled for the Auckland Regional Council. Hillside Workshops in Dunedin overhauled these carriages in 2002 and 2003, further refurbished between 2008 and 2009, and retired in 2014 as the electrification of Auckland's rail network was completed. The carriages were top and tailed by DBR class diesel locomotives.

SXA1744 was sold by Auckland Transport in its imported condition to Dunedin Railways and was used for storage. It was later on sold and is now privately owned and located near Bluff as of 2021. The six carriages in MAXX livery were stored in Taumarunui in the central North Island until sold for a dollar each to the Railway Enthusiasts Society. Five of the number consisted of AT MAXX set of SXV1697, SXC1741, SXC1742, SXC1743 and SXV1746. After a detailed inspection, they did not fulfil their needs and were advertised to Australian and New Zealand preservation groups. One was sold to Taumarunui Rail Action Centre Trust. There was no further interest in the remaining five, so they were advertised on auction site TradeMe and were sold to private owners around New Zealand with bogies in March 2021 and were removed from Taumarunui on 17 June 2021. SXC1743 was relocated to Whanganui, SXC1742 went to Hastings and the remaining three carriages went to a single owner in Taupo. The relocation of SXC1742 from Taumarunui to Hastings was shown in season one, episode four (2021) of the television show Moving Houses.

=== Preserved ===
One set (7 cars) has been retained by Queensland Rail's Heritage Division while others have been preserved including seven at the DownsSteam Tourist Railway & Museum, another set in Cairns with Cairns Kuranda Steam Pty Ltd (stored in Cairns) and a set owned by Queensland University of Technology (stored at Ipswich).

- SXV1745 Static Display at the Taumarunui Rail Action Centre in its AT MAXX configuration and livery from 2021.

== Subclasses ==
The SX carriages consisted of three subclasses:

- SXA
- SXC
- SXV

The SXC carriages were normally coupled to a SXV power van carriage. The SXV had a generator compartment, with a 65kVa Perkins/Leroy Somer diesel alternator set to provide electrical power to the other carriages. As a result, the SXV carriages had less space for passengers.

In New Zealand service, the SX carriages all had multiple unit equipment installed to allow for push-pull mode operation.

== Sources ==
- Higham, Geoffrey (2007). Marble Bar to Mandurah: A History of Passenger Rail Services in Western Australia (1st ed.). Bassendean: Rail Heritage WA. ISBN 978-0-9803922-0-3. OCLC 271545712. Wikidata Q140375689.
- KiwiRail (2011). KiwiRail Locomotive and Rolling Stock Register - 2011. Mosgiel, New Zealand: Triple M Productions. ISBN 978-0-9582072-2-5.
