= Suburban multiple unit =

Queensland Rail EMU suburban trainsets

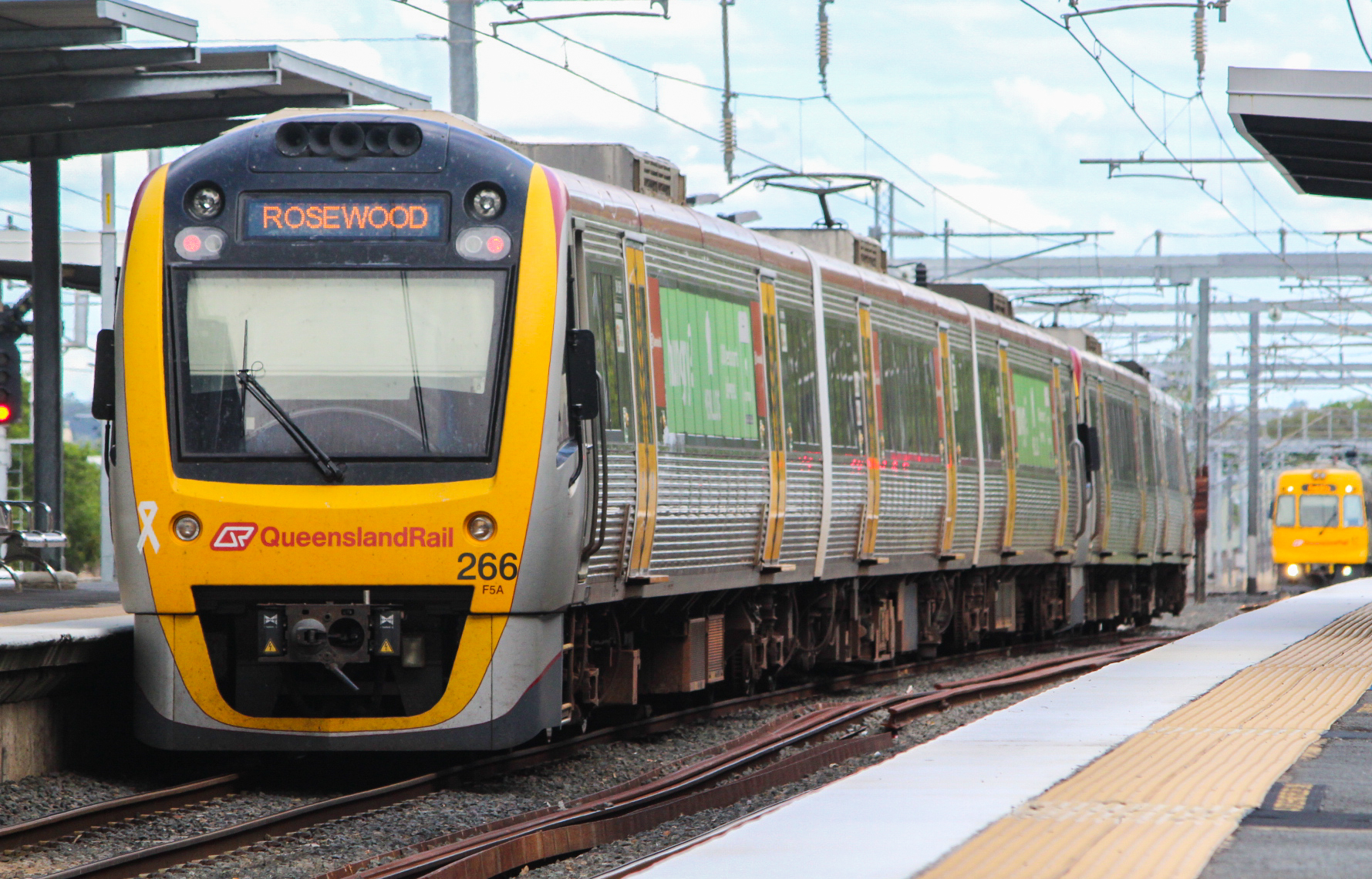
- SMU 266 departing Corinda station

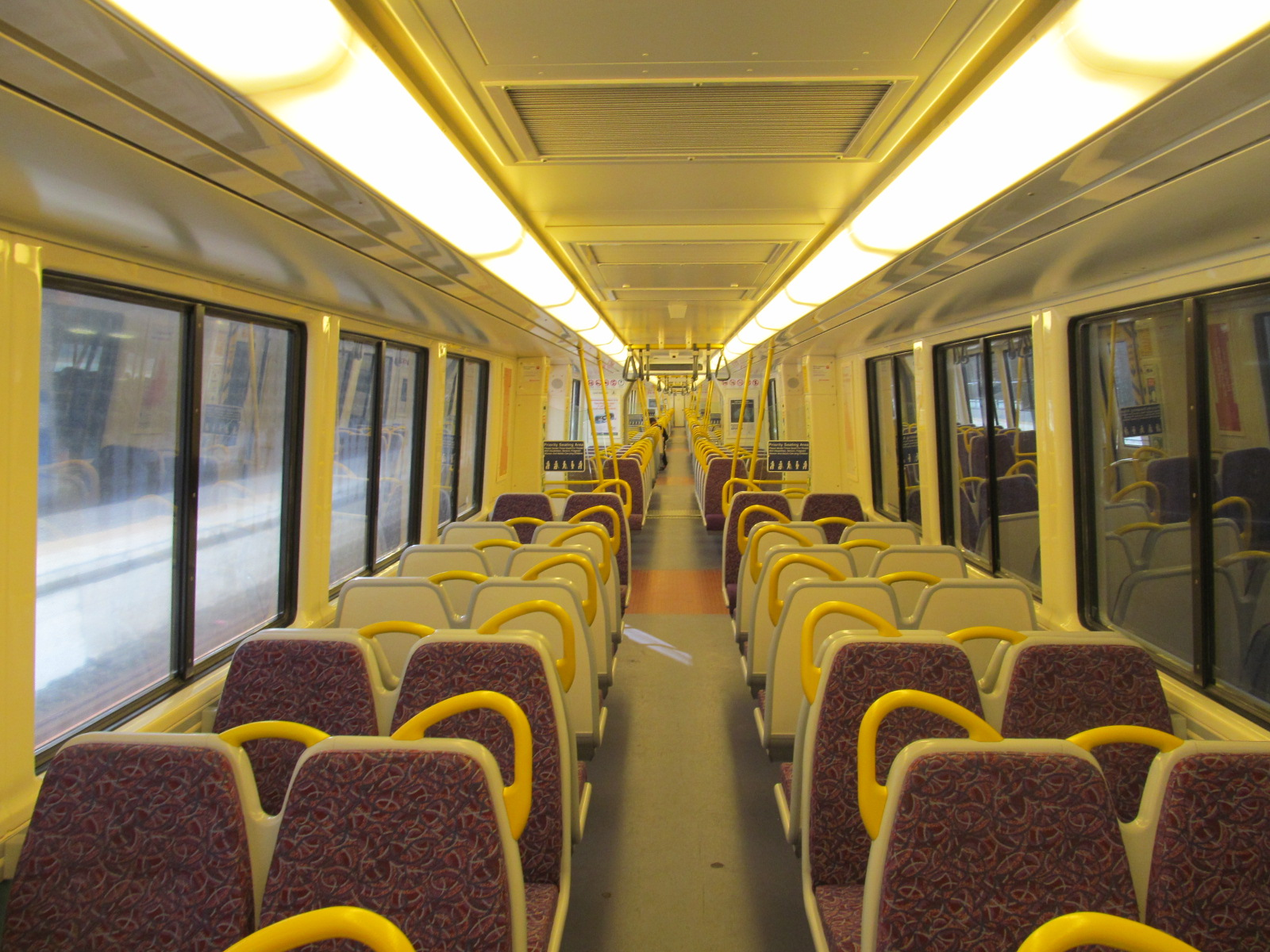
- Interior of an SMU 260
- Manufacturers: Walkers Limited (200 and 220); Downer EDI Rail/Bombardier (260)
- Built at: Maryborough
- Replaced: SX carriages
- Constructed: 1994–1995 (200); 1999–2001 (220); 2008–2011 (260)
- Number built: 36 carriages (200); 90 carriages (220); 108 carriages (260)
- Formation: 3-car sets
- Fleet numbers: 201–212 (200); 221–250 (220); 261–296 (260)
- Capacity: 240 (200); 236 (220–260)
- Operator: Queensland Rail

Specifications
- Train length: 72.42 m (237 ft 7 in) (260)
- Car length: 24.21 m (79 ft 5 in) (260 – end cars); 24 m (78 ft 9 in) (260 – intermediate cars)
- Maximum speed: 100 km/h (62 mph) (200–220); 130 km/h (81 mph) (260)
- Weight: 126.1 t (124.1 long tons; 139.0 short tons) (200); 122.1 t (120.2 long tons; 134.6 short tons) (220); 128.2 t (126.2 long tons; 141.3 short tons) (260)
- Traction system: 200: ABB MICAS-S2 GTO–VVVF; 220 and 260: Bombardier MITRAC IGBT–VVVF
- Traction motors: 8 × 180 kW (240 hp) 3-phase AC induction motor
- Power output: 1.44 MW (1,930 hp)
- Electric system: 25 kV 50 Hz AC (nominal) from overhead catenary
- Current collection: Pantograph
- UIC classification: Bo′Bo′+Bo′Bo′+2′2′ (200); Bo′Bo′+2′2′+Bo′Bo′ (220/260)
- Braking systems: Blended Regenerative electric and electro-pneumatic
- Multiple working: Within type; With IMU160 (260 only)
- Track gauge: 1,067 mm (3 ft 6 in)

The Suburban multiple units (SMU) are a class of electric multiple units manufactured by Walkers Limited/Downer EDI Rail, Maryborough for Queensland Rail's Citytrain division between 1994 and 2011. The SMU is divided into in three subclasses, units 201–212 as the 200 series, units 221–250 as the 220 series, and units 261–296, as the 260 series.

== Design ==
The Suburban Multiple Units consist of three cars. The first car is a Driver Motor fitted with motors for all variants (numbered 5), the middle car is either a motor car (numbered 6 for SMU 200 series) or trailer car (numbered 7 for SMU 220/260) with pantograph fitted, and the third car is either a Driver Trailer (SMU 200 series) or the second Driver Motor B also fitted with motors for the SMU 220 and 260 series (numbered 8). Like most trains in the Citytrain fleet, two three-car SMUs can be coupled to form one six-car unit.

== History ==
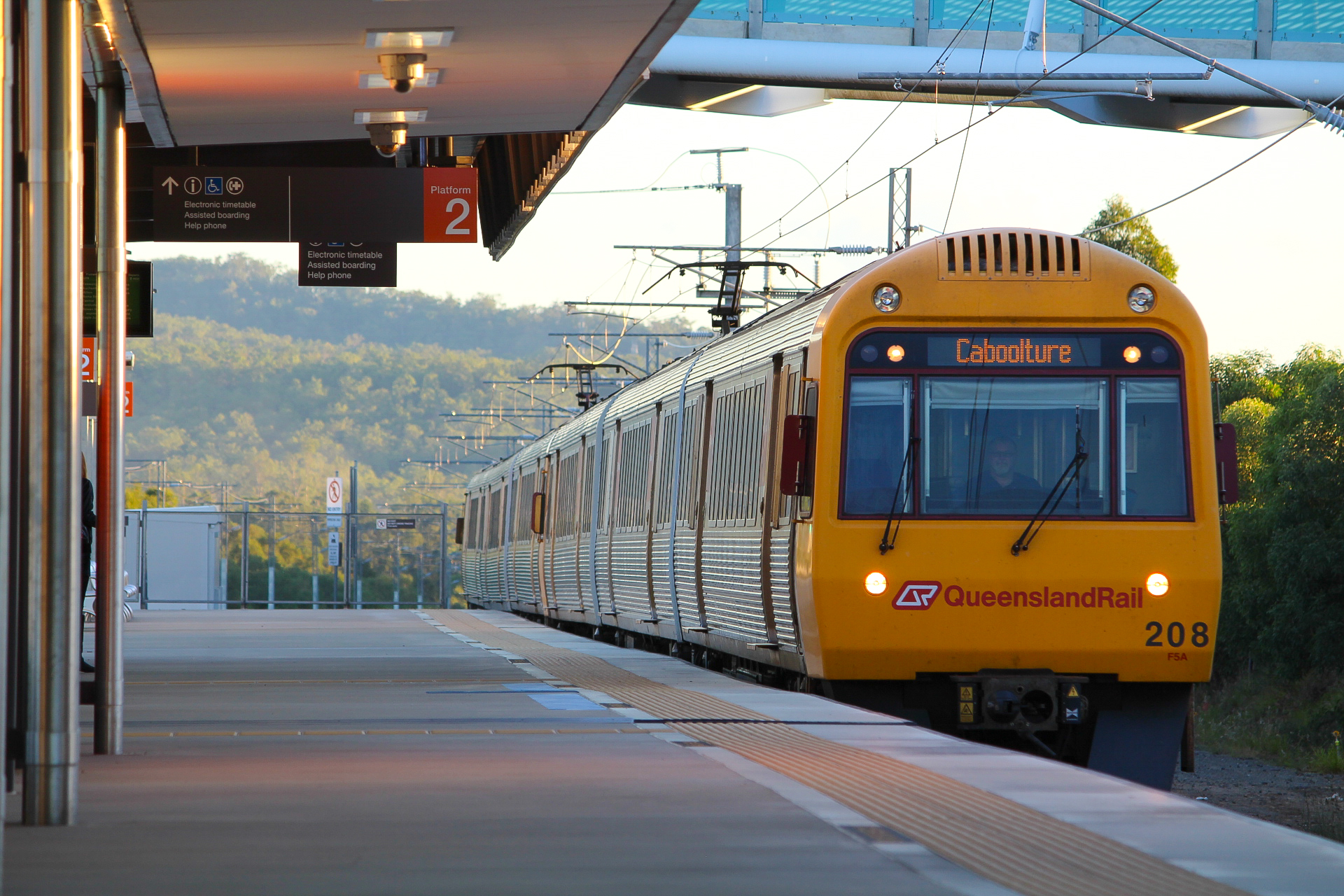
An SMU 200 (SMU208)

=== 200 series ===
The SMU200 series were introduced in 1994 due to a rollingstock shortage after an increase in demand. They were the first new trains since the EMU deliveries ended in 1989. Twelve were built by Walkers Limited, Maryborough with electrical equipment supplied by ABB. The trains are numbered SMU201-SMU212. The first entered service on 16 August 1994.

=== 220 series ===
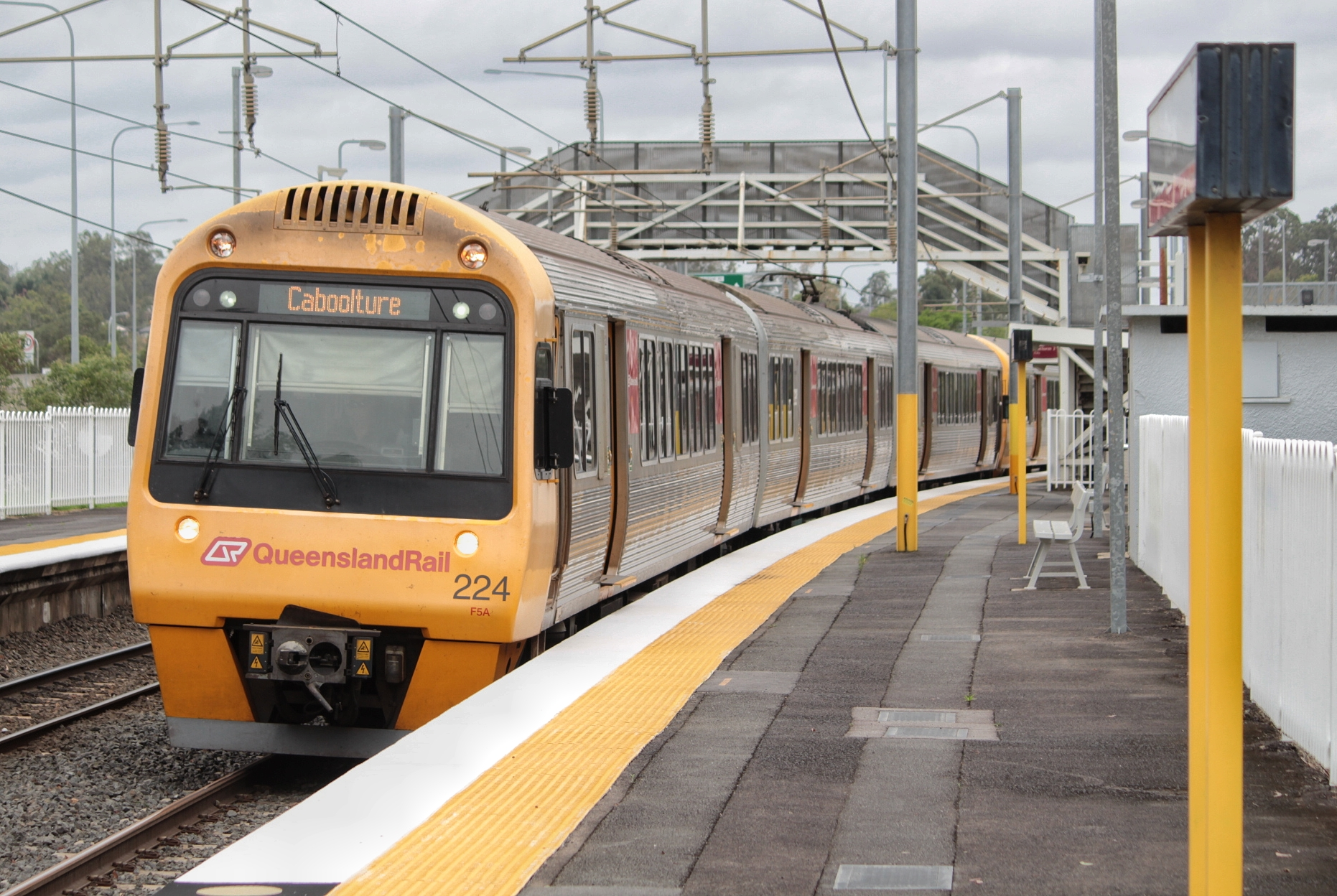
An SMU 220 (SMU224)

The SMU220 series were introduced into service in August 1999 to cater for service increases on recently upgraded lines such as the Caboolture line triplication from Northgate to Lawnton. The SMU220s replaced the last remaining loco-hauled SX carriages suburban services in Brisbane. The trains are numbered SMU221-SMU250. All have motor driving cabs at both ends each coupled to the trailer power car in the middle (DMA-T-DMB) as opposed to the DM-M-DT configuration. These cars were manufactured by Walkers Limited in partnership with ADtranz. These units use more energy efficient IGBT traction packages, as opposed to the thyristors for the 200 series. The train’s body design is similar to its predecessor, albeit with a single air conditioning module in the middle of each carriage. Selected units previously had a software update installed to enable them to operate slightly higher speeds suitable for the Gold Coast line and would have the markings 'HS' on the right, but this practice was discontinued due to wheel wear issues, and the braking system not being adequately equipped.

==== Refurbishment ====
Older SMUs have undergone progressive re-configuration to seating, lighting and hand-rail arrangements to allow easier access to the elderly, parents with prams and people with disabilities, which includes people in wheelchairs. Older SMUs have been refurbished to comply with the Australian Disability Discrimination Act 1992 with the 220 series having the carpet interiors replaced with hard-wearing Linoleum flooring for low maintenance cleaning, with a blue section for seating compartments separated by red tactile bumps that are situated in doorways. Dot-matrix displays have been added alongside new automated voice announcement systems on older SMUs (the SMU260s were delivered with them already installed). These systems are used to address passengers with information such as the current and next station as well as alerting passengers where to transfer for other services.

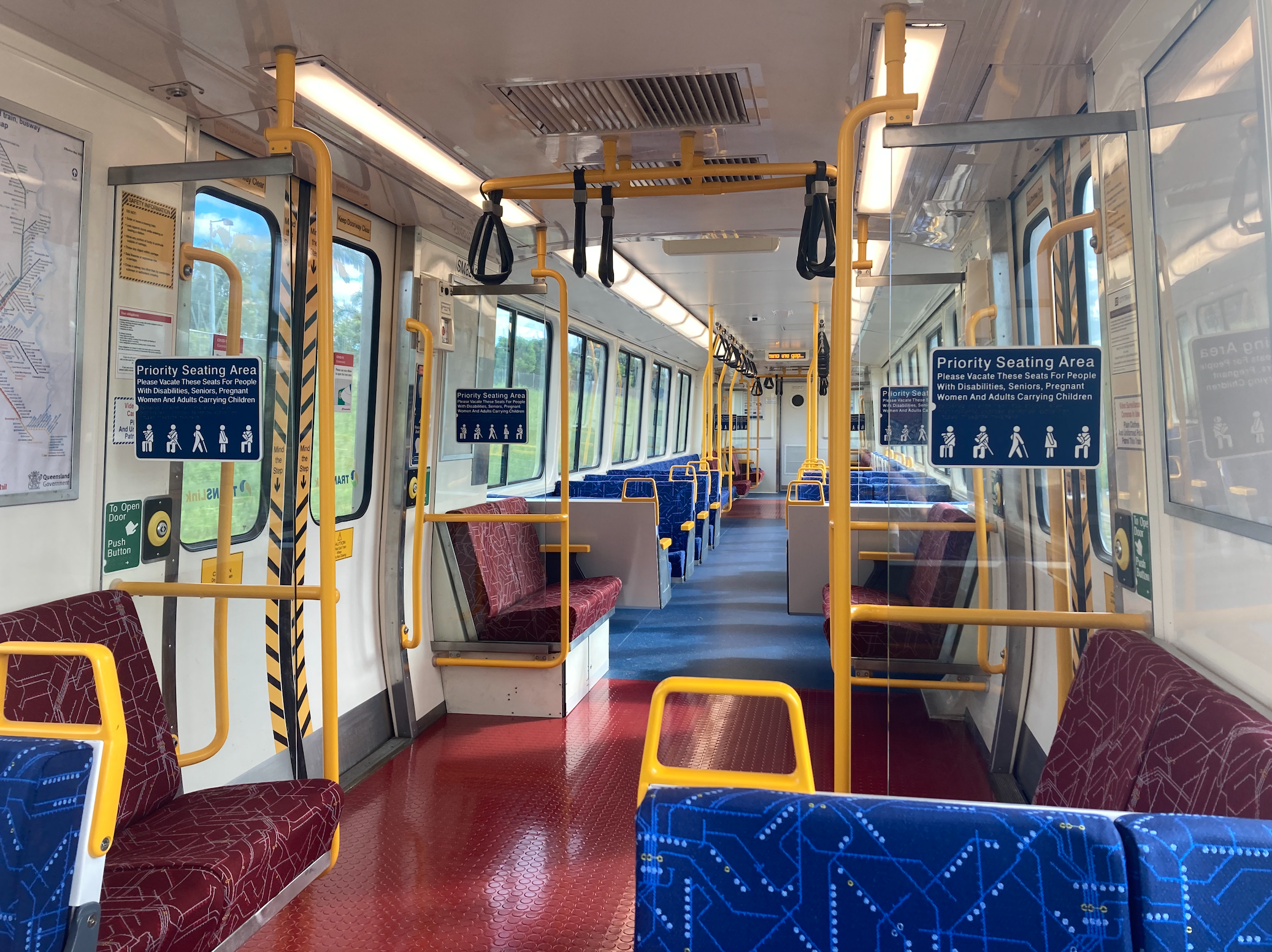
Interior of upgraded SMU200 (212) in 2023

Along with the rectification of the NGR, the government has announced that the SMU200 & 220 series will be overhauled at Maryborough extending their services into the future. The SMU200 units have been completed with new flooring and seat fabric among many cosmetic and mechanical improvements performed on the units. These units are recognisable by having the door frames on the cab doors painted black (with the exception of SMU 205).

=== 260 series ===
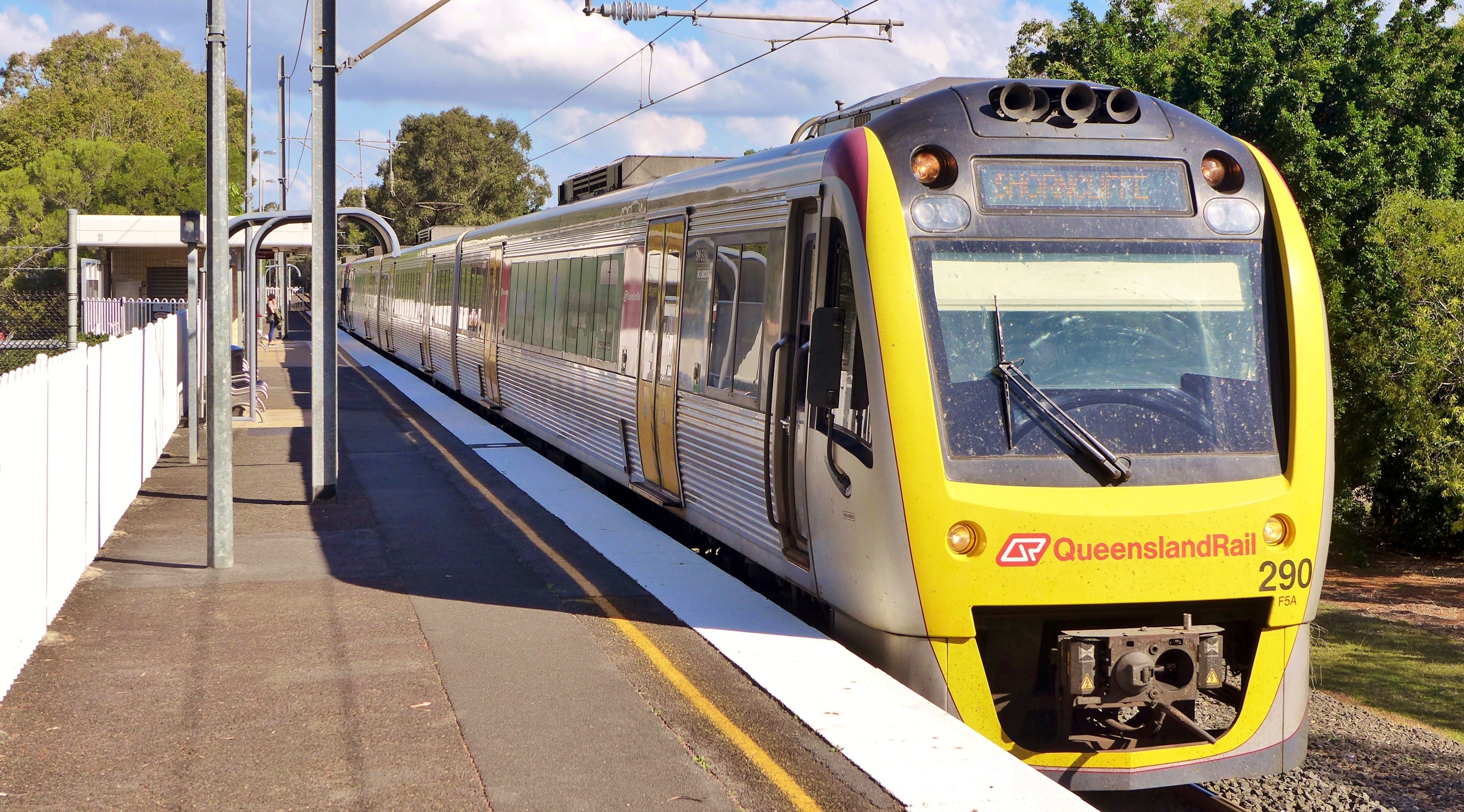
An SMU 260 class (numbered 290)

In 2004, eight SMU260 class units were ordered from Downer EDI Rail, Maryborough to cater for increased demand. They are of a similar design to the Transperth B-series train. The first two units entered service in August 2008. These were followed by an additional 14 units. In March 2009, an additional 20 units were ordered. These units are identical in design to the IMU 160 series trains with the exception of toilets and luggage racks, and the 260s and 160s are also interoperable with each other. It also has similar operating speed of 130 km/h (81 mph) to the IMU 160, making it ideal for running on interurban lines.

==== Refurbishment ====
Since July 2023, the SMU260s have been undergoing a major refurbishment. Two units, SMU262 and SMU266, have already been completed under this scheme with new vinyl flooring, better Wi-Fi, digital advertising screens and the driver B carriage having mostly sideways seating.

== Gallery ==
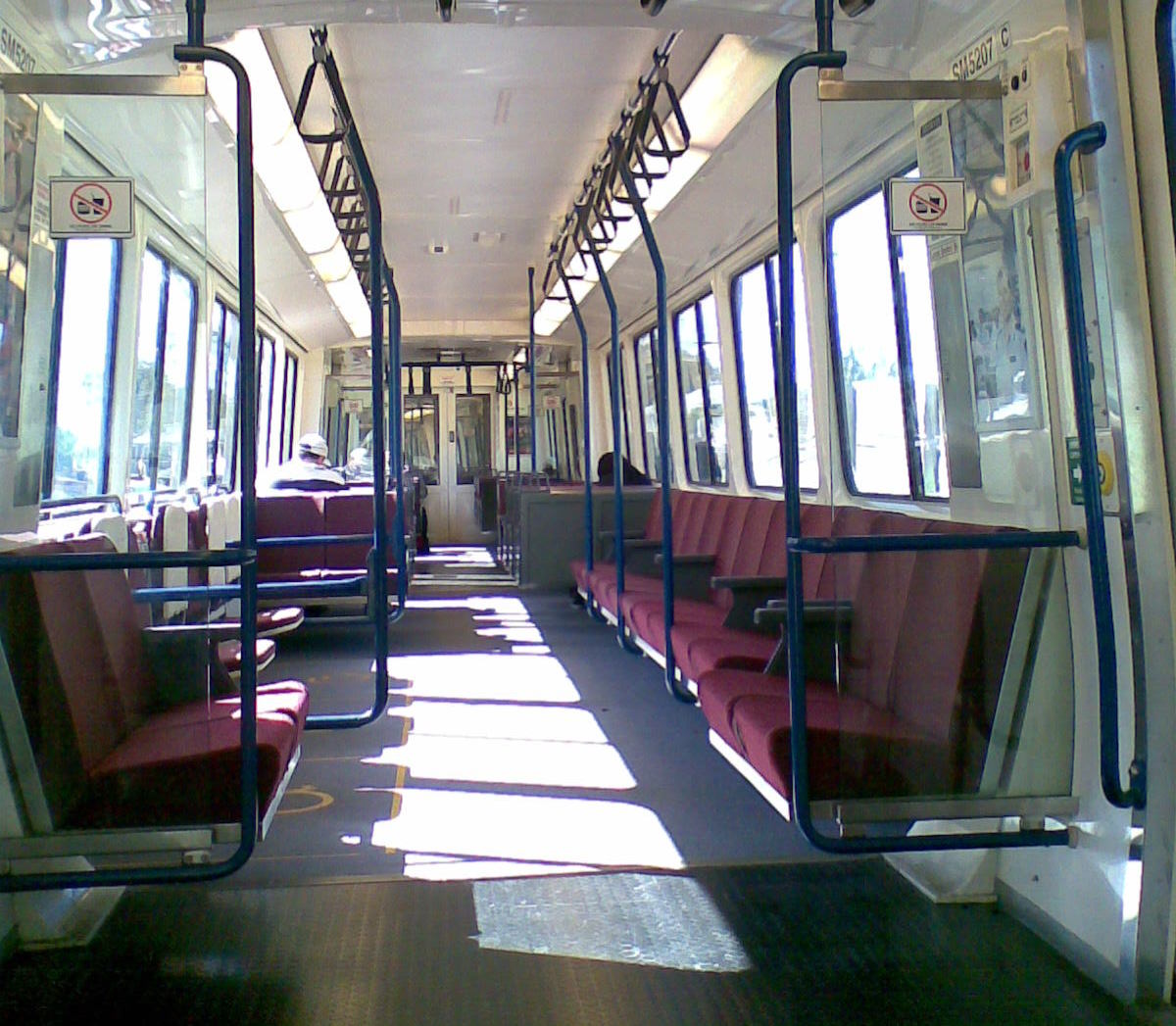
Unrefurbished interior of an SMU 200

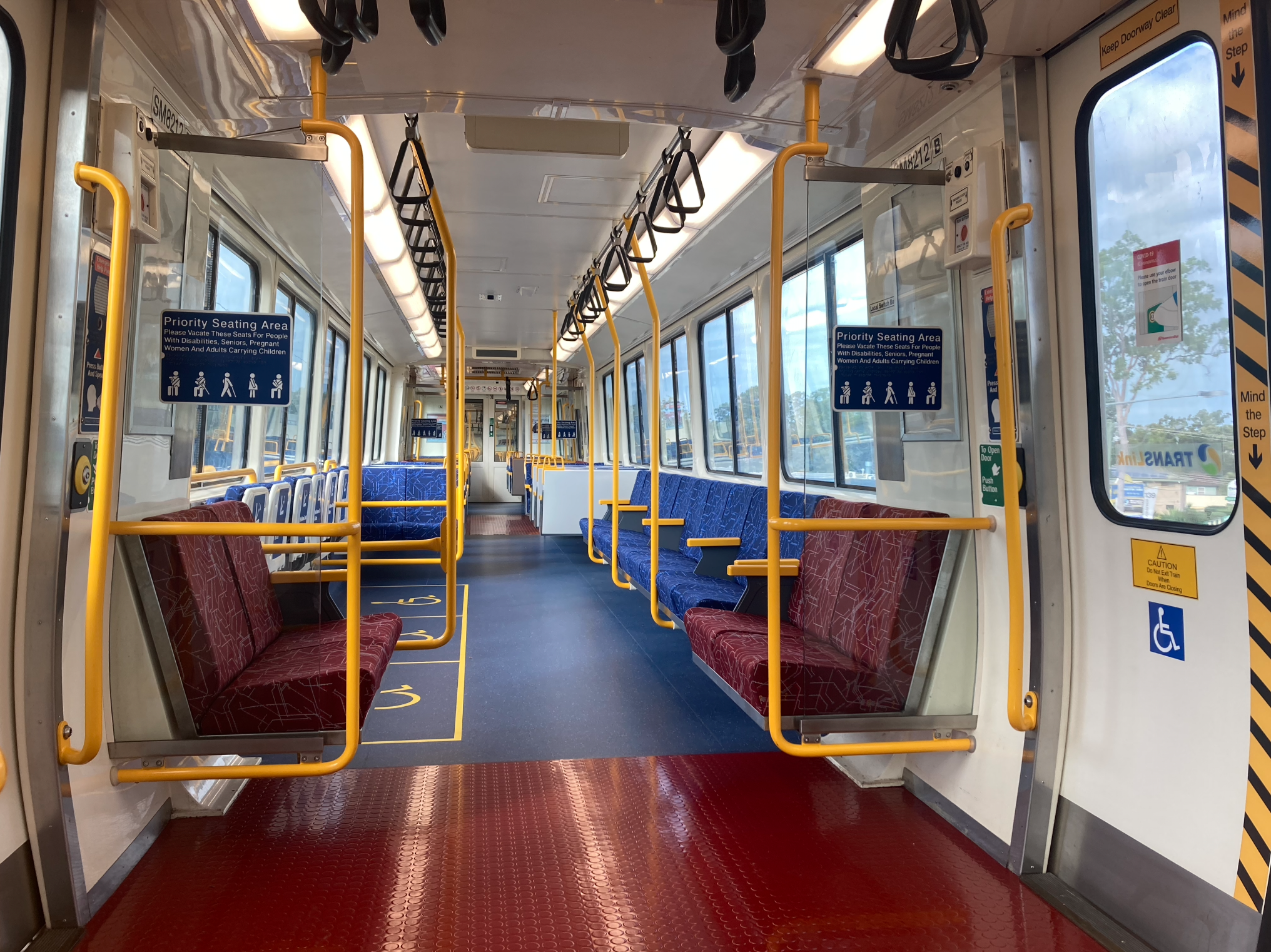
Refurbished interior of SMU200

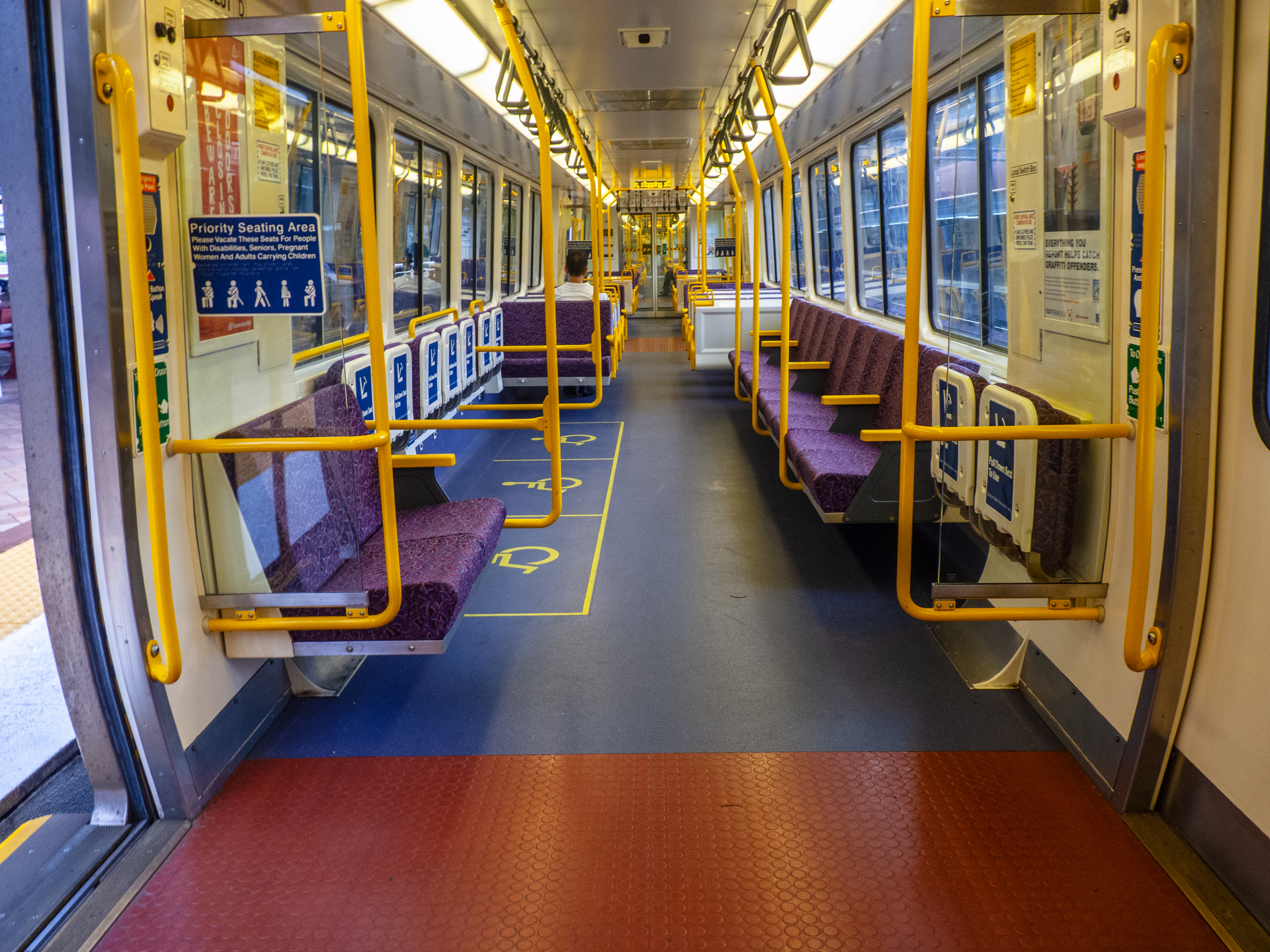
Refurbished interior (SMU 220)
