= Queensland Museum Rail Workshops =

The Workshops Rail Museum
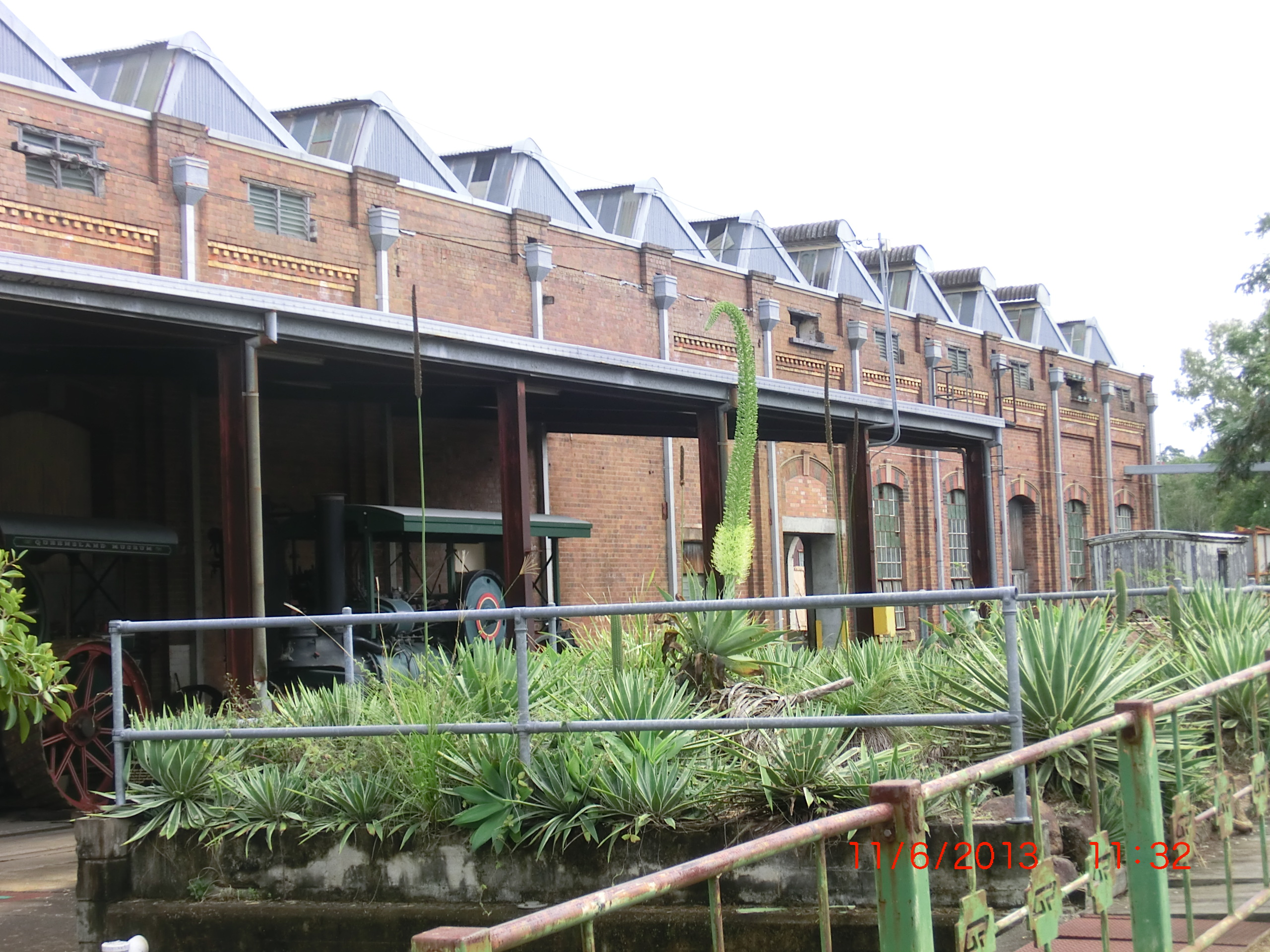
- The museum in June 2013
- Established: September 2002
- Location: North Ipswich Railway Workshops
- Coordinates: 27°36′08″S 152°45′26″E
- Type: Transport museum
- Director: Andrew Moritz
- Owner: Queensland Museum
- Public transit access: Westside Bus Company route 515 (from Ipswich railway station)
- Parking: Free on-site parking
- Website: www.theworkshops.qm.qld.gov.au

The Queensland Museum Rail Workshops (formerly the Workshops Rail Museum) is a railway museum in Ipswich, Queensland, located within the Queensland Rail owned North Ipswich Railway Workshops and tells the story of more than 150 years of railways in Queensland. Exhibits are spread out across a number of the complex's original buildings housing a collection of historic steam and diesel locomotives and other rolling stock that operated on Queensland Railways, as well as general interest exhibits and ones tailored specifically for children.

The museum, which opened in 2002, is part of the Queensland Museum network, and highlights include the oldest working locomotive in Australia and the largest model railway in Queensland.

The Workshops were closed until further notice, following a 26 October 2025 severe hailstorm.

== History ==
=== Ipswich Railway Workshops ===
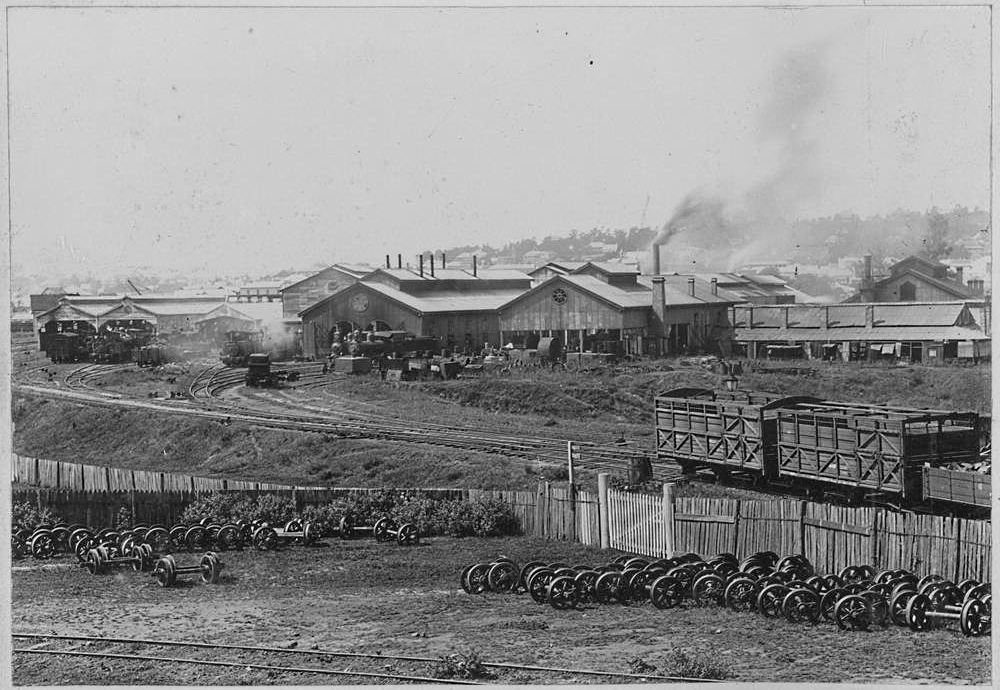
The workshops c.1890

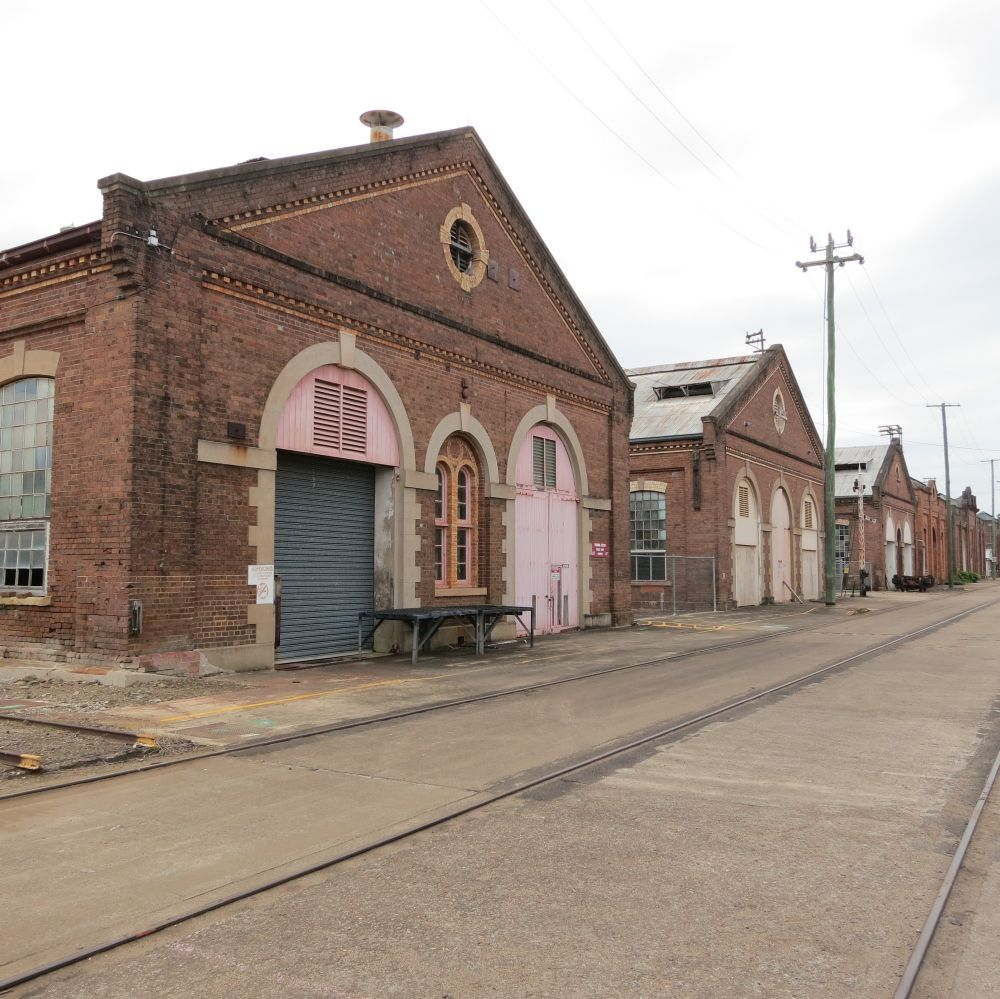
The workshops in 2016

Queensland's first railway line, opened on 31 July 1865, ran between Ipswich and Grandchester, approximately 35 km (21.7 mi) (Note: The actual length of line, as stated in the tender for construction issued by the Department of Lands and Works on 19 November 1863, specified a length of "21½ miles".) to the town's west. To support the new line, which became known as the South and West Railway, construction of two workshop buildings at Ipswich commenced in 1863, about a kilometre (0.62 miles) south of the present facility on the northern banks of the Bremer River. The workshops were mostly intended for maintenance, but it was also where the state's first steam locomotives imported from the United Kingdom were assembled.

==== Locomotive and wagon construction ====
By the time the line to Grandchester opened, plans were already well underway to extend it over the Great Dividing Range to provide access to the agriculturally rich Darling Downs. Work commenced in November 1865 and opened to Gatton on 24 May 1866, to Helidon on 30 July and finally to Toowoomba on 12 April 1867. However, the Al0 Nelson locomotives imported from England struggled with the gradient and were limited to loads of no more than 58 tons between Murphy's Creek and Toowoomba. Larger B11-class locomotives built in Glasgow entered service in 1867 which could haul a load of 64 tons but these were later deemed too heavy for the rails by Chief Engineer H. C. Stanley, and although locomotives continued to be imported from the United Kingdom and the United States of America, (Note: From the Baldwin Locomotive Works of Philadelphia commencing with the A10 Baldwin and C16 Baldwin classes in 1879 through to the AC16 class in 1943.), the workshops commenced plans to construct their own locomotives.

In 1877, the workshops built its first locomotive, a one-off modification of the A10 Neilson-class was known as the A10 'Ipswich'-class to differentiate it. However, in the same year a Select Committee for the Colony of Queensland recommended against local manufacture, and for the next two decades no new locomotives were built at the workshops (Note: This was not to say steam locomotives were not built in Ipswich in this period; in 1889, the Phoenix Engineering Company of Lowry Street North Ipswich built the first of 25 B13-class locomotives from a design by Dübs and Company of Glasgow, Scotland.), and instead rebuilt existing locomotives often with larger fireboxes and higher pressure boilers for greater power, as well as converting four of the eight original A10 Neilson 2-4-0 tender locomotives to 2-4-2 tank locomotives (which were redesignated as the 4D10-class).

In 1908, the first of a new class, the B17-class (originally known as the "mail engine" as it was tasked to haul mail trains) was built. Designed by Locomotive Engineer H. Horniblow (1883–1899 and 1904–1910), this was the first locally designed locomotive built at the workshops. (Note: Following the death of Horniblow in 1910, the other 20 members of this class of locomotive were built at the workshops between May 1911 and May 1914, first under Locomotive Engineer R. T. Darker (February–July 1910) and then C. F. Pemberton (from August 1910).)

As Queensland's rail network grew in size, the need for a larger fleet of locomotives led to the North Ipswich Railway Workshops, as they came to be known, grew in size and function.

At its peak during World War II, The Workshops, as it is affectionately known, employed around 3,000 men and women, mostly from Ipswich and the surrounding areas, making it one of the state's largest employers of the time. Those employed included:

- blacksmiths
- boilermakers
- carpenters
- electrical and mechanical engineers
- metalworkers
- painters, and
- riveters and welders.

In its history, The Workshops constructed more than 200 steam locomotives and 13,000 carriages, and is the only Australian railway workshop that has been in continuous operation since the 1800s.

==== Building construction and expansion ====
The workshops' original buildings were two prefabricated sheds imported from England. Over the decades, the workshops grew in size and function and larger, more permanent buildings were constructed over the subsequent decades, often highlighted by architectural style of that period. Some buildings have been repurposed, and are listed by their current purpose:

- 1880s: During the original expansion period five propose-built workshops were constructed:
  - K Mill (1885), former Paint Shop / North Saw Mill / Wood Machine Shop
  - Tarpaulin Shop (1886; extended c. 1901–03 to connect to K Mill), former Machine Shop
  - Wheel Shop (1885, extended 1923), former Wagon Shop
  - Trimmers' and Electroplating Shop (1885), former Carriage Shop / Timber Store / Paint Shop
  - Spring Shop (1887, extended 1924), former Smithy (Blacksmith) Shop / Foundry / Forge
- 1903–04: Ten additional buildings were constructed to provide storage, power generation, and water storage and supply; these were:
  - Blacksmith Shop (1903, extended 1922 and by 1946)
  - Boiler Shop (1903, extended 1918, 1936 and 1944)
  - Carriage and Wagon Shop (1903)
  - Erecting and Machine Shop (1903, extended 1928 and 1938)
  - Maintenance Carpenter's Shop (1903, extended 1927), former Pattern Shop
  - Power House (1903)
  - Pump House (1903)
  - Bogie and Brake Shop (1904): former Foundry and Moulding Shop
  - Supply Warehouse (1904, extended 1914 and 1925), former Stores
  - Water Tower (1904)
- 1906–12: Five additional buildings were constructed to provide further operational capability as well as general support:
  - Timekeepers' Office (1911)
  - Dining Hall (1912, extended 1935)
  - Locomotive Store (1906, extended 1909), former Westinghouse Brake Shed / Spray Paint Shop / Spray Shed
  - Fibreglass Shed (1911): former Sawmill / Breaking Down Mill
  - Paint Shop (1912)
- 1930s–40s: Eight additional buildings were constructed to provide further operational capability and general support:
  - Electrical Tool and Gang Store (1938)
  - Laboratory (1939, extended 1941)
  - Lighting Up Shed and Toilet Block (c. 1940)
  - Sheet Metal Shed Toilet Block (c. 1940)
  - Tool and Gauge Shop (1941)
  - Wagon Repair Shed / Old Fibreglass Shed (1945)
  - Former Sheet Metal Shed (1946, extended 1950s)
  - Sub Station No. 3 (1946), attached to west side of Bogie and Brake Shop
- 1950s: This decade saw the construction of just one additional building, the White Metal and Sand Blasting Shop (1956)
- 1970s: Two additional buildings were constructed to provide further operational capability:
  - Sheet Metal Amenities (1971)
  - Carriage Shop Amenities (1979)
- 1980s: Two additional buildings were constructed to provide further operational capability:
  - Testing Shed (1983)
  - Moulding Room (1988)

Not all buildings that remain within the complex are used by the museum, with some still operational and off-limits to the public.

==== Opening of the Museum ====
Following the opening of the Redbank Railway Workshops in 1958 for its diesel fleet and with stream locomotives being phased out of service in the 1960s. (Note: The last regular service operated by a steam locomotive was on 21 December 1969, more and more of the Ipswich Workshops' functions were transferred to the more modern facility, with many of the building no longer being used by the 1990s.)

In August 2002, the Workshops Rail Museum was officially opened, and contained the locomotives previously displayed at the old Redbank museum.

Despite its heritage status, The Workshops is still a functioning maintenance facility for Queensland Railways.

Some of the buildings were subject to a fire in September 2011 and November 2012. A severe hailstorm over the Ipswich area on Sunday 26 October 2025 resulted in the closure of the Workshops, and the need for restoration work.

=== Queensland Railways Locomotive Museum ===
In 1964, members of the Queensland Division of the Australian Railway Historical Society (ARHS) approached Queensland Railways with a request to have a number of steam locomotives, soon to be withdrawn from service with the introduction of diesels, set aside for preservation. The original plan of six locomotives increased to fourteen – the Queensland Railways Heritage Fleet – and coincided with the Ipswich Rotary Club's plan to relocate and preserve A10 locomotive A10 no. 3 and two carriages that had previously been on displayed at Countess Street in Brisbane city to Ipswich. The plan was met with the full support of the then Commissioner for Railways, Alva G. Lee, and a number of sites were considered over the next few years before a plot of land on the north of railway station opposite the railway workshops was chosen, approximately 15 km (9.3 mi) east of the current museum.

On 7 February 1970, the Queensland Railways Locomotive Museum was officially opened and as well as the Queensland Railways Heritage Fleet and A10 no. 3. Within the next few years, two further locomotives were added, A10 no. 6 and B13 no. 48, which had operated privately on Gibson & Howes private tramway near Bundaberg on the Central Coast. The museum was entirely outdoors, except for a small shed containing the curator's office and a souvenir shop, with the locomotives exposed to the weather.

In 1991, due to concerns about security of and to prevent further deterioration to the locomotives, as well as workplace health and safety issues, the decision was taken to close the collection to the public. However, QR entered into an agreement with Queensland Museum and the collection would be transferred to then Railways Historical Centre at Ipswich, which become a branch of the Queensland Museum. The Redbank Museum closed in 1992.

== Buildings ==
The Workshops contains 16 Heritage-listed buildings spread out across its 60 acres (24.3 hectares), of which the following are used by the Museum:

=== The Bogie Shop ===
Opened in January 1902, this building was first used for over sixty years as the workshops' foundry where metal parts for locomotives, rolling stock and infrastructure were cast. Casting was done in iron, brass and aluminium using wooden patterns (moulds). During World War II, the Foundry also produced various metal casings and fittings for ships of the Royal Australian Navy.

In 1965, the Foundry was moved to the new Redbank Workshops, and this building became the Bogie Shop casting bogies and wheels for railway vehicles. Casting operations ended in the 1990s and the building is now used for storage of some of the Museum's larger items. The building is off-limits to the public, but views of the interior can be gained from behind the safety fence.

=== The Boiler Shop ===
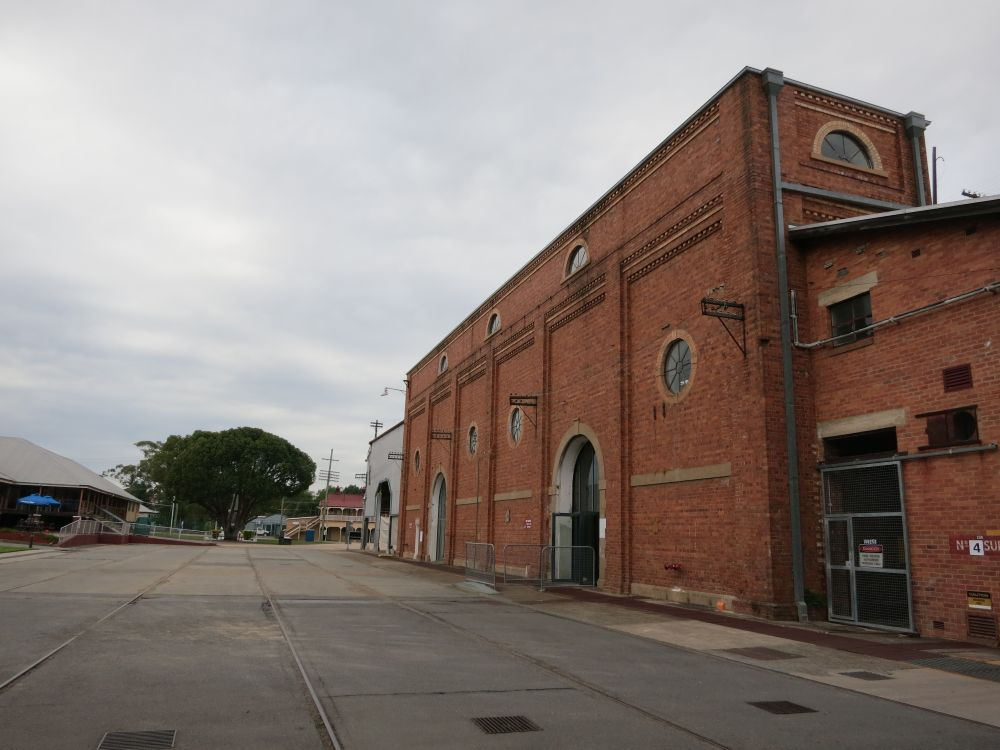
The Boiler Shop in 2016

The Boiler Shop was where the boilers for steam locomotives were built, and as the workshops' construction capacity increased, the Boiler Shop expanded four times to keep up with the increasing demand for making and repairing boilers. Power for the Boiler Shop was provided by the Power House.

During its busiest period in the 1950s, up to 24 boilers could be made or repaired at any one time, and at its peak more than 300 staff worked in the Boiler Shop and by today's occupational health and safety standards it was dangerous place to work. It was a very noisy from the forging hammers and pneumatic machinery, and was also rather dirty as it had a dirt floor to ensure the boilers would not get damaged when rolled onto the floor. The Boiler Shop now houses the museum's main exhibits.

=== The Power House ===
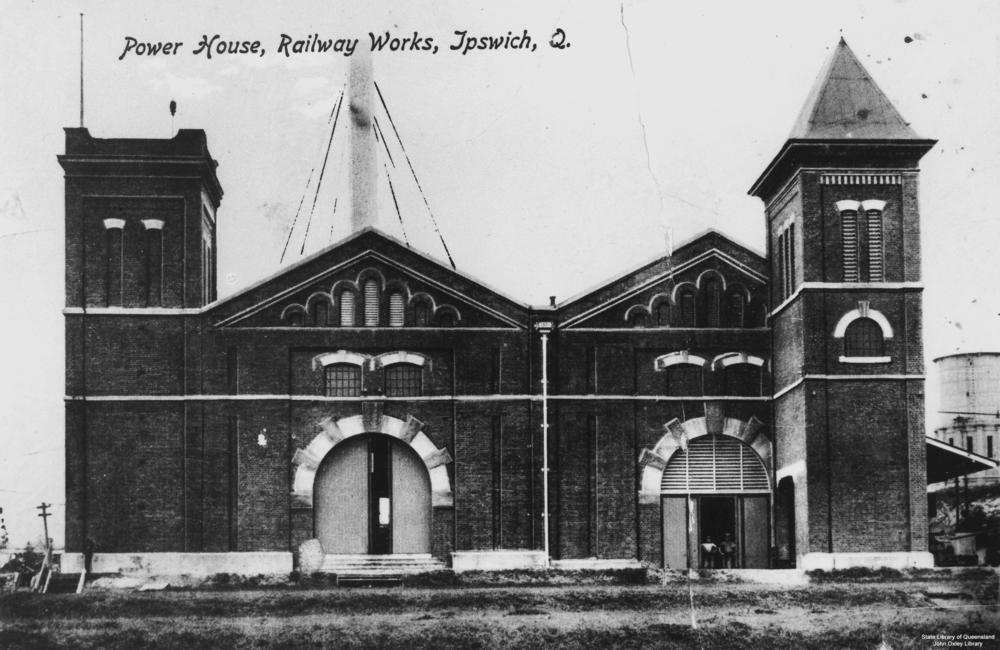
The Powerhouse, c,1914

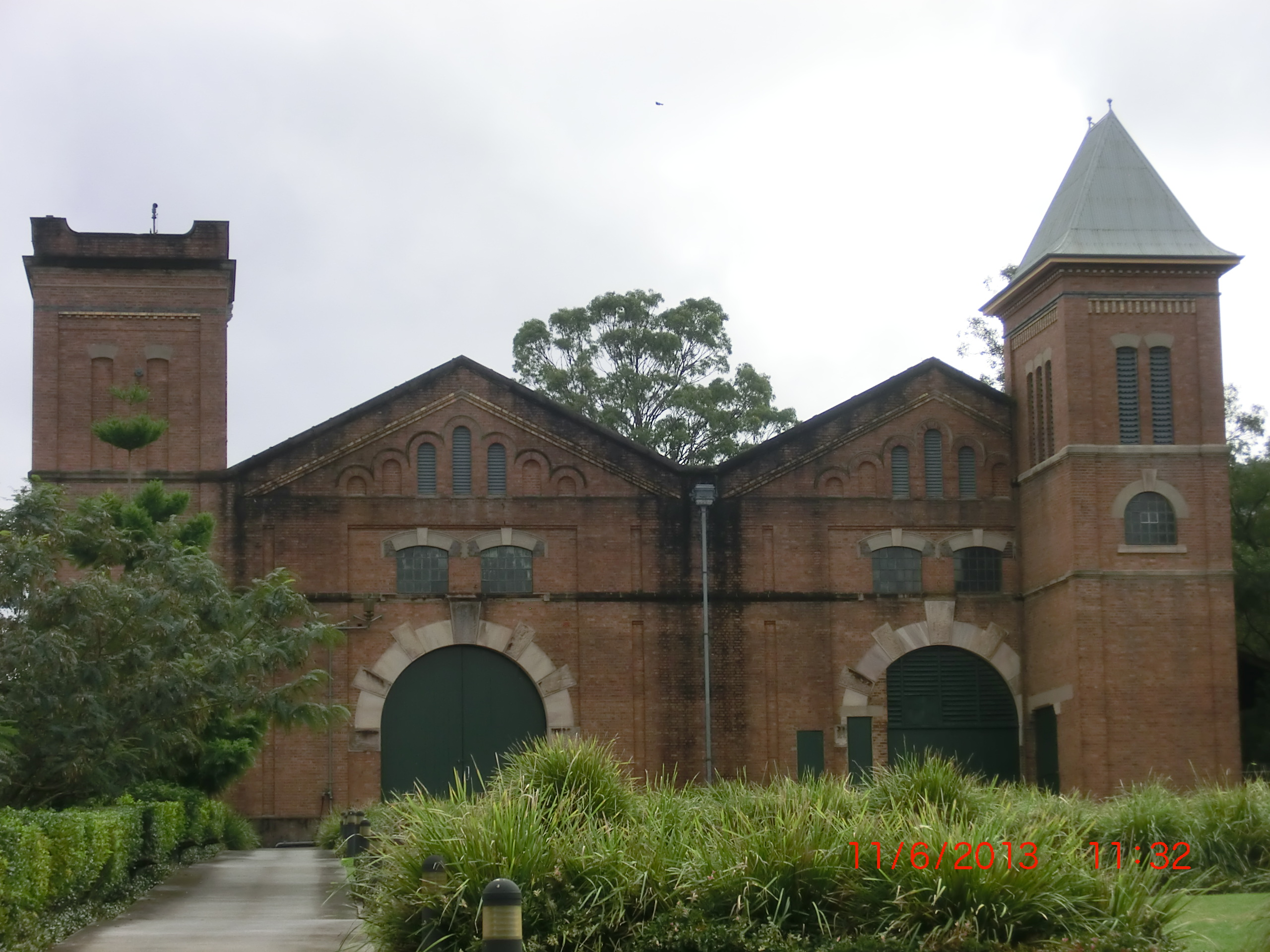
The Powerhouse in 2013

When the workshops were originally built, as Ipswich did not have an electricity supply, the machinery was driven by steam power. As the site expanded rapidly in the late 19th century, electricity was seen as the key to its modernisation and in 1902, the Power House was built so as to supply electricity to the workshops, one of the first industrial complexes in Queensland to use electricity on a large scale. As well as electricity, the Power House also supplied compressed air and hydraulic pressure to power the complex's machinery.

Construction commenced in 1901 by contractor D. D. Carrick with equipment from the Westinghouse Electric and Manufacturing Company provided by Noyes Brothers of Sydney and took a little over a year to complete. The boilers were located on the east side of the building and the engine room, containing the generators and switching gear, on the west side. The system generated 2-phase 60-cycle Ac current with sufficient power for about 200 electric motors, and was also provided to Ipswich Railway Station and the shunting yard on the south side of the Bremer River. The building was off limits to most workshop employees, accessible only to the electricians, engineers and maintenance fitters and turners.

Electricity cane to Ipswich in 1917 with the establishment of the Ipswich Electric Supply Company (Note: The Ipswich Electric Supply Company was a subsidiary of the Brisbane-based City Electric Light Company, and while it is often quoted that the City Electric Company supplied the electricity to The Workshops, it would appear that it was actually supplied by this subsidiary.) and by the mid 1930s, with the equipment at the Power House deemed obsolete, the workshops stopped producing electricity on site and began using the local supply. Alternators and a transformer were installed in the Power House to convert the power to a supply suitable for the older machinery.

=== Timekeeper's Office ===
The Timekeeper's Office is a two-storey timber building constructed in 1910 which served as the workshop workers' entrance. Workers passed through this building every morning and afternoon to collect and return their individual worker's "check", a brass disc with their employee number stamped on it. Each day the timekeeper would tally up the uncollected discs; for those disc that remaining the worker was deemed absent and wasn't paid for that day. It was also where the workers were paid, queuing up to receive their pay packets.

Behind the office stands a sculpture entitled 'Marker' by artist Brad Nunn. The piece is covered with the representation of hundreds of workers' discs, which "symbolise the memories of the workers, their spirit and their stories". Inset into the pathway between the office and the sculpture are eight plaques which are enlarged copies of workers' discs.

The building now serves as the visitor's entrance to The Workshops.

=== Workers' Dining Hall ===
The workers' dining hall (canteen) was built in 1911 to provide a cheap meal for workers. Each day when the lunchtime whistle – located on the front of the Power House – sounded, hundreds of workers poured into the hall to buy a three-course lunch. During World War II, the dining hall served around 2,500 lunches daily. This was the first place where women worked on the site.

Located in front of the hall is the Ipswich Railway Workshops War Memorial, unveiled on 26 September 1921. During World War I more than three hundred men from the workshops enlisted in the Australian Imperial Force, of which thirty-one did not return. (It was reported of the 15,000 male employees who served the war, 3000 never returned.) After the war the workshops raised £1400 to build the memorial, to honour those employees who served and died. The memorial, which features a figure of a soldier with a rifle standing at attention atop a column, was designed by Queensland Railways architect, Vincent Price, while London sculptors, John Whitehead & Sons sculpted the figure. Bronze plaques on the column display the Coat of arms of Queensland, the Queensland Railway Badge and the names of those who served with those who did not return highlighted.

=== Other facilities ===
There is an onsite shop and cafe, and toilets and baby change facilities are provided in a number of buildings. Most exhibits are wheelchair-accessible and sensory kits are available for the visually impaired. Service animals are permitted. The museum is available for venue hire.

== Exhibits ==
The Workshops is laid out in 'zones' that "showcase the social, technical and cultural impacts rail transport and travel have had on our lives". Each zone contains one or more exhibits of a common theme. The exhibits are either permanent, such as the main collections, or are special events that run for a specific period of time; from 24 November 2022 to 14 May 2023 the exhibit 'Australia in Space', developed by Questacon is featuring, which "reveals the ways that Australian innovations are used in space, and the surprising benefits space technologies bring to everyday life here on Earth."

Originally there were 15 zones but this later increased to 17, numbered 1 to 11 and 13 to 18 (as of February 2023, there is no Zone 12).

- Vice Regal Carriage: the special carriage built at the workshops in 1903 for the governor of Queensland and visiting royalty.

The Queensland Museum Rail indoor exhibits was temporarily closed after a storm in 2025.

== Collections ==
The museum's collection contains diesel and steam locomotives and pieces of other rolling stock from Queensland Rail as well as various private operators.

=== Steam locomotives ===
The Workshops has a large number of steam locomotives on display, some of which operate heritage trains. Others are undergoing overhaul or restoration and may not be accessible for public viewing. Preserved locomotives include:

Class	No.	Status	Notes
A10	3	Undergoing restoration	Built 1866, works number 1214
A10	6	Restored, operational	Built 1865, works number 1170
AC16	221A	Restored, operational	
B13	48	Awaiting restoration	In storage not accessible to public
B13½	398	Restored, static	Built 1908, works number 4
B15	290	Awaiting restoration	In storage not accessible to public
B18¼	771	Restored, static	Built 1929, works number 128. Only surviving member of class.
BB18¼	1079	Restored, operational	Built 1956, works number 547
BB18¼	1089	Restored, operational	Built 1958, works number 557
Beyer-Garratt	1009	Restored, static	Built 1950, works number 7359
C17	2	Awaiting restoration	In storage not accessible to public
C17	974	Restored, operational	Built 1951, works number 511
C17	100	On display, dismantled	Built 1953, works number 537
C19	700	Awaiting restoration	Built 1923, works number 98. Only surviving member of class. In storage not accessible to public.
DD17	1051	Undergoing overhaul	Built 1952, works number 210. Undergoing boiler replacement
PB15	444	Restored, static	Built 1908, works number 89
PB15	732	Awaiting overhaul	Built 1926, works number 379

=== Diesel locomotives ===
Class	No.	Status	Notes
1250-class	1262	Static	Cutaway display showing inner mechanisms
1270-class	1281	Static	
1620-class	1620	Operational	Part of the QR Heritage Fleet – used for excursion trains
1620-class	1650	Awaiting restoration	Donated by ARHS(QLD).
1620-class	1651	n/a	Donated by ARHS(QLD). Used as a source for spare parts.
DL-class	DL1	Static	First diesel locomotive to enter service in Queensland in 1939

=== Electric Multiple Units ===
Class	No.	Status	Notes
Electric multiple unit (Queensland Rail)	01	Static	First EMU to enter service in Queensland in November 1979. also 01 was one if the first to go to darra and Ferny Grove when that line got electrified in 1979
Electric multiple unit (Queensland Rail)	04	Static	forth EMU to enter service in Queensland in November 1979
InterCity Express (Queensland Rail)	153	Static	
InterCity Express (Queensland Rail)	157	Static	

== Awards ==
The Workshops was the winner of the 2007 Australian Tourism Award for Heritage and Cultural Tourism.

== See also ==
- Ipswich Railway Workshops War Memorial, a heritage-listed war memorial on the grounds of the workshops
- North Ipswich Railway Workshops
- List of transport museums
- List of museums in Queensland
