= A10 class =

A10 class may refer to:

- Queensland A10 Avonside class locomotive
- Queensland A10 Baldwin class locomotive
- Queensland A10 Fairlie class locomotive
- Queensland A10 Ipswich class locomotive
- Queensland A10 Neilson class locomotive
