= A12 =

A12, A.12 or A-12 may refer to:

== Aviation ==
- A-12 Shrike, a World War 2–era American attack aircraft
- Abrial A-12 Bagoas, a French experimental glider of the 1930s
- Aero A.12, a Czechoslovak light bomber built after World War I.
- Lockheed A-12, codenamed Oxcart, a high-altitude, high-speed reconnaissance aircraft, manufactured for the CIA
- McDonnell Douglas A-12 Avenger II, an early attempt by the US to develop stealth aircraft, cancelled due to cost overruns

== Military ==
- Aggregate 12, a German rocket design in World War II that was never constructed
- Brazilian aircraft carrier São Paulo (A12), a French-built aircraft carrier in use by the Brazilian Navy
- HMS A12, a British A-class submarine of the Royal Navy
- Matilda II (tank), built to General Staff specification A12, a British tank of World War 2.

== Science and technology ==
- A12 Authentication, a CHAP-based mechanism used by a CDMA2000 Access Network to authenticate a 1xEV-DO Access Terminal
- ARM Cortex-A12, a 32-bit multicore processor
- Apple A12, a 7-nanometer 64-bit ARM SoC
- ATC code A12 Mineral supplements, a subgroup of the Anatomical Therapeutic Chemical Classification System
- British NVC community A12 (Potamogeton pectinatus community), a British Isles plant community
- A Rhodopsin-like receptors subfamily
- Samsung Galaxy A12, an Android phone

== Other uses ==
- A12 road, in several countries
- Fiat A.12, a 1916 Italian, 6–cylinder, liquid-cooled in-line engine
- LSWR A12 class, an 1887 British steam locomotive model
- Queensland A12 class locomotive
- Queensland A12 small class locomotive
- Route A12 (WMATA), a bus route in Washington, US
- A12 scale, musical tuning based on the 4:7:10 triad
- English Opening (Encyclopaedia of Chess Openings code A12, among others)
- Unite the Right rally, referred to as "A12" locally, a white supremacist rally in Charlottesville, Virginia, which took place on August 12, 2017
- X Æ A-12, the son of Elon Musk
- A12-Speed, a track in Trackmania United Forever & Nations Forever best known for its shortcut
