= Queensland 6D13½ class locomotive =

Class of Australian 0-6-0ST locomotive

Queensland Railways 6D13½ class
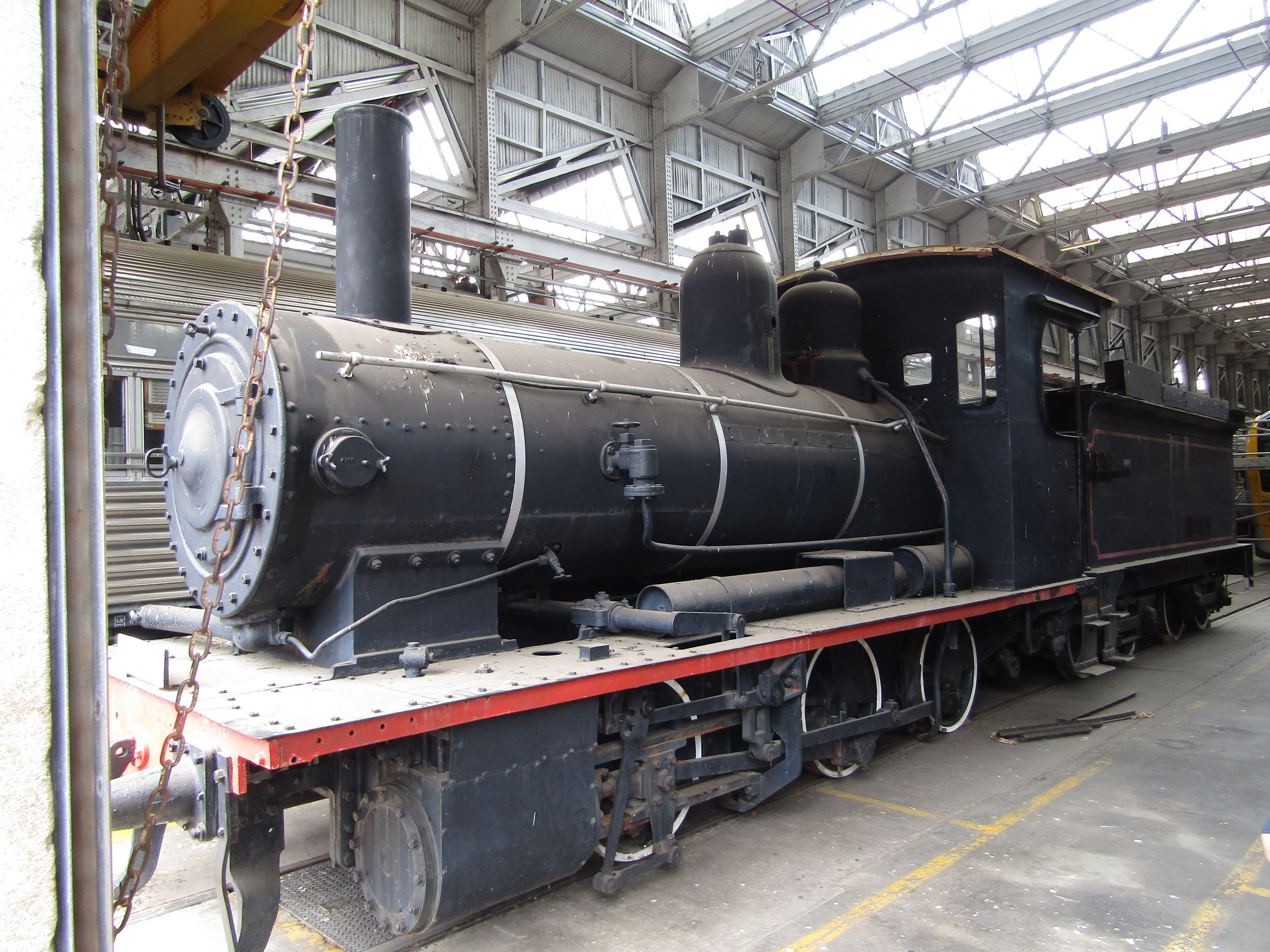
- B13 1/2 398 - nicknamed Pompey - stored at the Ipswich Railway Workshops after being displayed for a long time.
Type and origin
- Power type: Steam
- Builder: North Ipswich Railway Workshops
- Serial number: 2-7
- Build date: 1904-1905
- Total produced: 6
- Rebuilder: North Ipswich Railway Workshops
- Rebuild date: 6
- Number rebuilt: 1937-1938
Specifications
- Configuration
  - Whyte: 0-6-0T (as built); 0-6-0 (as rebuilt)
- Gauge: 1,067 mm (3 ft 6 in)
- Driver dia.: 3 ft 0 in (914 mm)
- Length: 26 ft 6 in (8.08 m)
- Fuel type: Coal
- Cylinders: 2 outside
- Cylinder size: 13.5 in × 20 in (343 mm × 508 mm)
Career
- Operators: Queensland Railways
- Numbers: 396-401
- Preserved: 398
- Disposition: 1 preserved, 5 scrapped

The Queensland Railways 6D13½ class locomotive was a class of 0-6-0T steam locomotives operated by the Queensland Railways.

== History ==
In 1904, the North Ipswich Railway Workshops assembled six 0-6-0T locomotives. The wheel sets came from B15 class locomotives, and the cylinders were purchased for an aborted project. Per Queensland Railway's classification system, they were designated the 6D13½ class, 6D representing they were a tank locomotive with six wheels, and the 13½ the cylinder diameter in inches.

They were generally used as shunters in Brisbane, but on occasions were used in Toowoomba and Warwick. In 1937–1938, all were converted to 0-6-0 tender locomotives and reclassified as the B13½ class with tenders from B13 and C15 class locomotives.

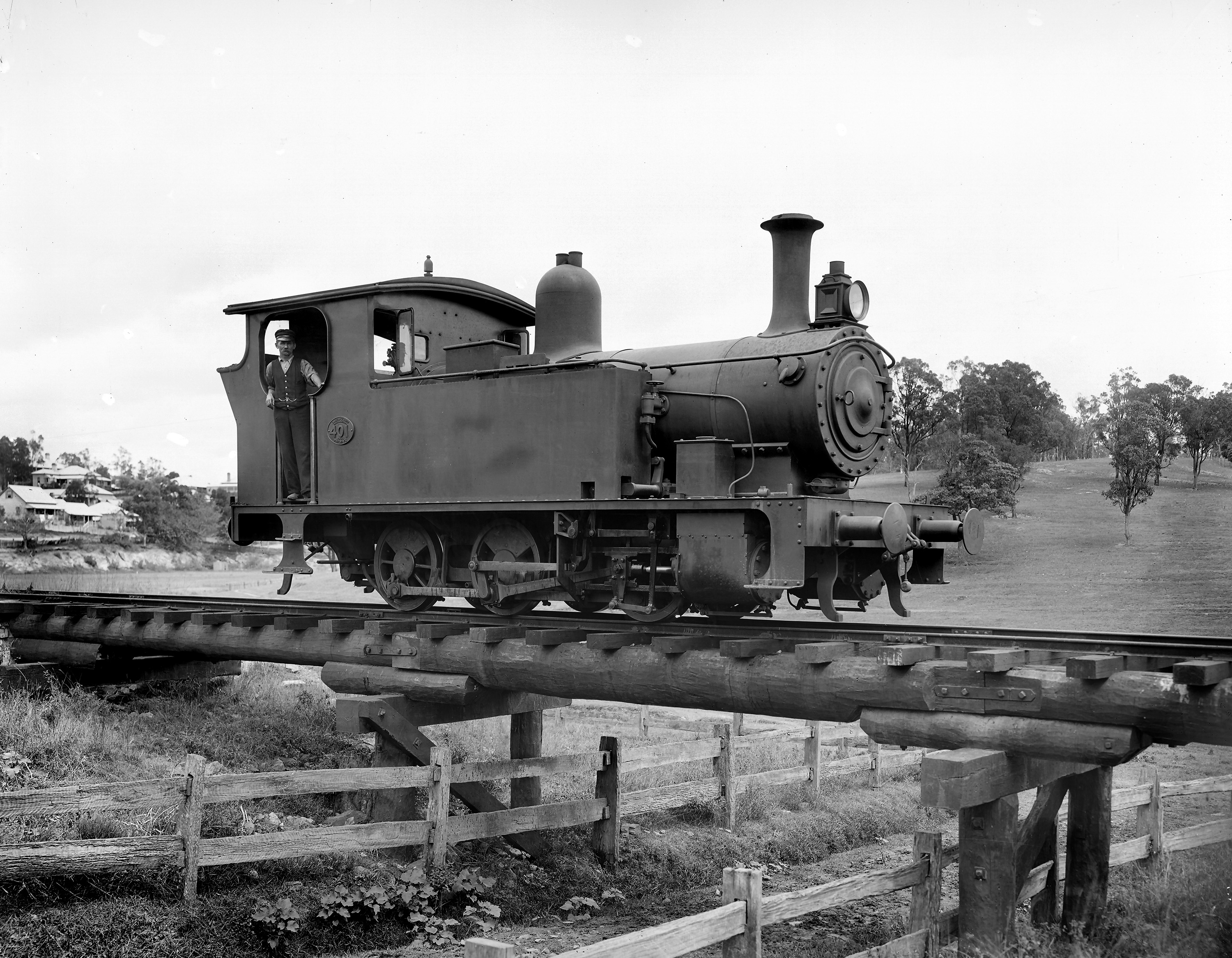
6D13 ½ Shunting-Loco No 401 on a timber bridge in Ipswich

== Class list ==
Number	Works number	In service	Notes
396	2	July 1904	
397	3	August 1904	
398	4	October 1904	Preserved at Workshops Rail Museum
399	5	November 1904	
400	6	February 1905	
401	7	April 1905	

== Preservation ==
One has been preserved:

- 398 "Pompey" at the Workshops Rail Museum
