= Queensland B16½ class locomotive =

Class of Australian 2-6-2 locomotive

Queensland Railways B16½ class
Type and origin
- Power type: Steam
- Builder: North Ipswich Railway Workshops
- Build date: 1918; 107 years ago
- Total produced: 1
Specifications
- Configuration
  - Whyte: 2-6-2
- Gauge: 1,067 mm (3 ft 6 in)
- Leading dia.: 2 ft 2 in (660 mm)
- Driver dia.: 4 ft 0 in (1,219 mm)
- Trailing dia.: 2 ft 2 in (660 mm)
- Length: 47 ft 6 in (14.48 m)
- Axle load: 12 tonnes (12 long tons; 13 short tons)
- Loco weight: 54.15 tonnes (53.3 long tons; 59.7 short tons)
- Tender weight: 21 tonnes (20.66834 long tons; 23.14854 short tons) (loco built 1918-1926); 33.4 tonnes (32.87250 long tons; 36.81720 short tons) (loco fitted with C16 tender 1926–1950)
- Total weight: 75.15 tonnes (73.96312 long tons; 82.83870 short tons) (loco built 1918-1926); 87.55 tonnes (86.16728 long tons; 96.50736 short tons)(loco fitted with C16 tender 1926–1950)
- Fuel type: Coke
- Water cap.: 1,200 imperial gallons (5,500 L; 1,400 US gal)(loco built 1918-1926); 3,000 imperial gallons (14,000 L; 3,600 US gal)(loco fitted with C16 tender 1926–1950)
- Firebox
  - Grate area: 1,712 sq ft (159.1 m^{2}) (loco built 1918-1926); 1,666 sq ft (154.8 m^{2}) (loco built 1926–1950)
- Boiler pressure: 175 psi (1,207 kPa)
- Heating surface
  - Tubes and flues: 1,294 sq ft (120.2 m^{2}) (loco built 1918-1926); 1,263 sq ft (117.3 m^{2}) (loco built 1926–1950)
- Cylinders: 2 outside
- Cylinder size: 16.5 in × 22 in (419 mm × 559 mm)
- Valve gear: Southern
Performance figures
- Tractive effort: 16,442 pounds (7,458 kg) (80%)
- Factor of adh.: 4.87
Career
- Operators: Queensland Railways
- Numbers: 204
- Disposition: scrapped

The Queensland Railways B16½ class locomotive was a one-off 2-6-2 steam locomotive operated by the Queensland Railways.

== History ==
In August 1918, the North Ipswich Railway Workshops completed an experimental locomotive designed to burn coke instead of coal in an attempt to reduce smoke nuisance caused by coal in Brisbane suburban tunnels. Per Queensland Railway's classification system it was designated the B16 class, B representing that it had three driving axles, and the 16 the cylinder diameter in inches. It was also experimentally built as a 2-6-2 and fitted with Southern valve gear. It was modified to burn coal in June 1927.

To provide enough heating surface to generate sufficient steam through its projected use the firebox was made wider for greater burning capacity. The two wheel trailing truck enabled the fitting of a wide firebox, necessary for a coke burning locomotive. The engine was originally fitted with the surplus tender from PB15 N° 411 after it was converted to a one off member of the 6D15 class. The tender was later changed to a standard C16 class locomotive tender to increase its potential range. The engine spent its working life on the Brisbane to Ipswich line working coal trains. It was withdrawn in February 1950.
