= Queensland A10 class 2-4-0 locomotive =

Queensland A10 class 2-4-0 locomotive may refer to:

- Queensland A10 Fairlie class locomotive
- Queensland A10 Ipswich class locomotive
