= Queensland 6D8½ class locomotive =

Queensland Railways 6D8½ class
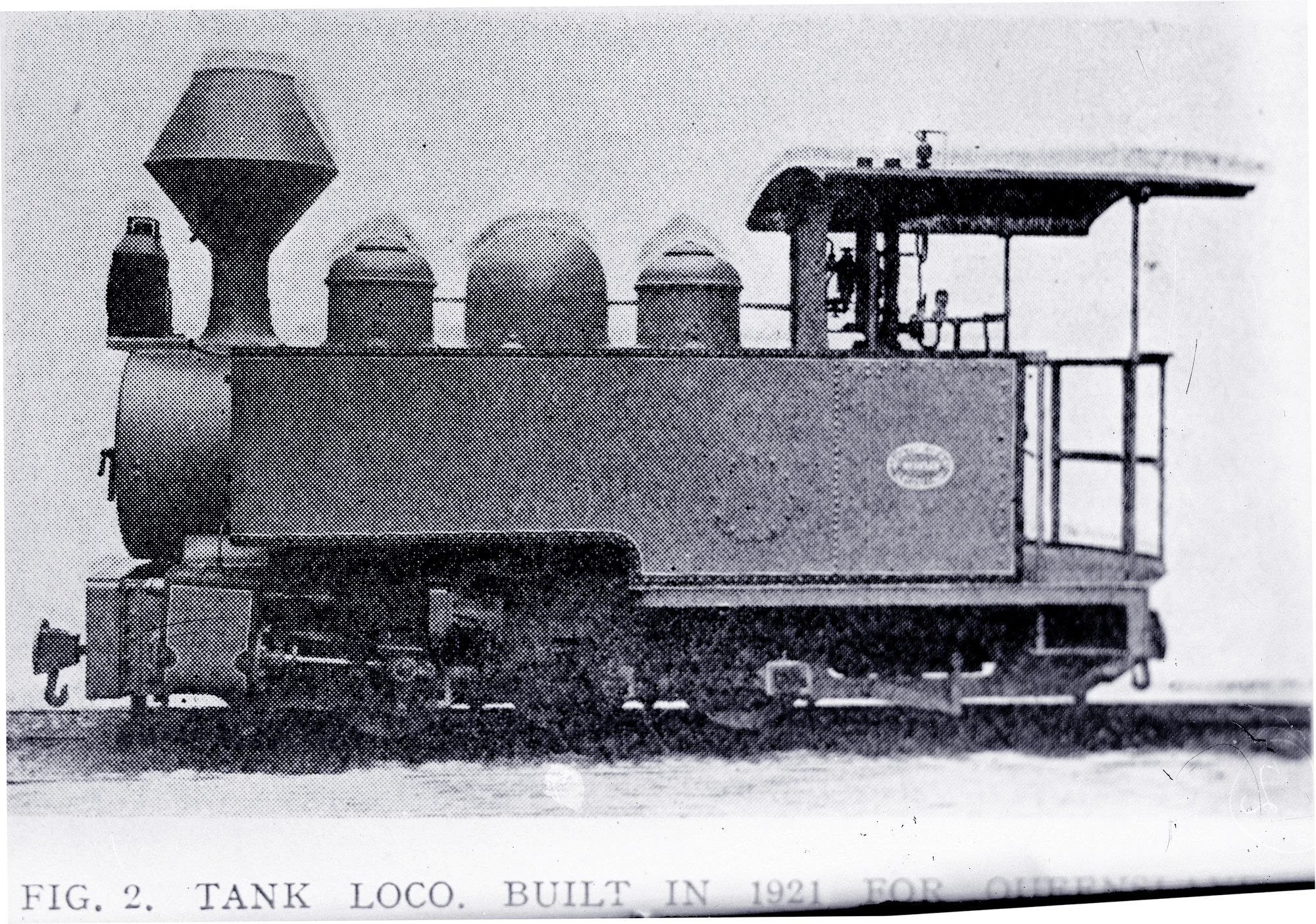
- No.5 tank type, Innisfail Tramway, 1921
Type and origin
- Power type: Steam
- Builder: John Fowler & Co
- Build date: 1900-23
- Total produced: 6
Specifications
- Configuration
  - Whyte: 0-6-0T
- Gauge: 610 mm (2 ft)
- Fuel type: Coal
- Cylinders: 2
Career
- Operators: Queensland Railways
- Numbers: 1-5, 8
- Disposition: all scrapped

The Queensland Railways 6D8½ class locomotive was a class of 0-6-0T steam locomotives operated by the Queensland Railways.

== History ==
The 6D8½ class was a class of similar locomotives built by John Fowler & Co, Leeds over a 23-year period. Per Queensland Railway's classification system they were designated the 6D8½ class, the 6 representing the number of driving wheels, the D that it was a tank locomotive, and the 8½ the cylinder diameter in inches.

== Class list ==
Number	In service	Notes
1	1900	Written off October 1925
2	1900	Written off June 1924
3	August 1915	Withdrawn September 1957
4	August 1915	Withdrawn September 1957
5	June 1921	Withdrawn September 1957
8	March 1923	Withdrawn January 1962
