= Queensland A14 class locomotive =

Class of Australian 4-4-0 locomotives

Queensland Railways A14 class
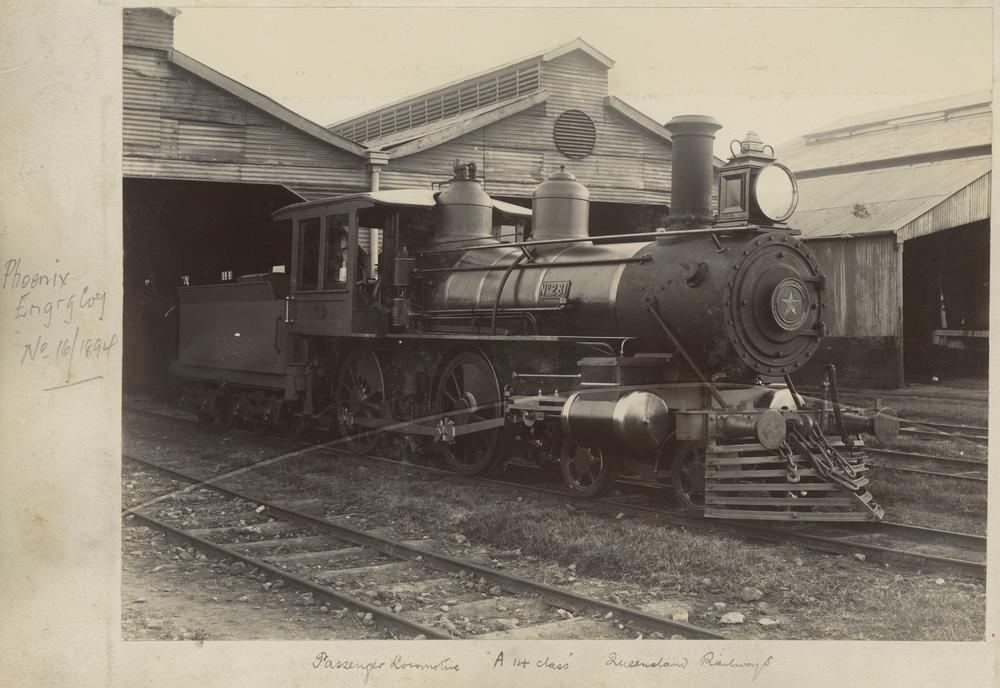
Type and origin
- Power type: Steam
- Builder: Phoenix Engine Company
- Serial number: 16-23
- Build date: 1894/95
- Total produced: 8
Specifications
- Configuration
  - Whyte: 4-4-0
- Gauge: 1,067 mm (3 ft 6 in)
- Driver dia.: 4 ft 3 in (1,295 mm)
- Fuel type: Coal
- Cylinders: 2 outside
- Cylinder size: Diameter: 14 in (356 mm) x (?)
Career
- Operators: Queensland Railways
- Numbers: 281-288
- Disposition: all scrapped

The Queensland Railways A14 class locomotive was a class of 4-4-0 steam locomotives operated by the Queensland Railways.

== History ==
In 1894/95, the Phoenix Engine Company, Ipswich built eight 4-4-0 steam locomotives for the Queensland Railways. Per Queensland Railway's classification system they were designated the A14 class, A representing they had two driving axles, and the 14 the cylinder diameter in inches.

All were reboilered in 1909 and withdrawn between 1922 and 1929.

== Class list ==
Number	Builder's number	In service	Notes
281	16	June 1894	Condemned October 1927
282	17	July 1894	Condemned February 1928
283	18	November 1894	Condemned March 1930
284	19	January 1895	Condemned February 1929
285	20	March 1895	Condemned June 1926
286	21	June 1895	Condemned October 1922
287	22	March 1895	Condemned November 1929
288	23	December 1895	Condemned December 1928
