= Queensland 8D11 class locomotive =

Double boilered steam locomotive operated by the Queensland Railways until 1902

Queensland Railways 8D11 class
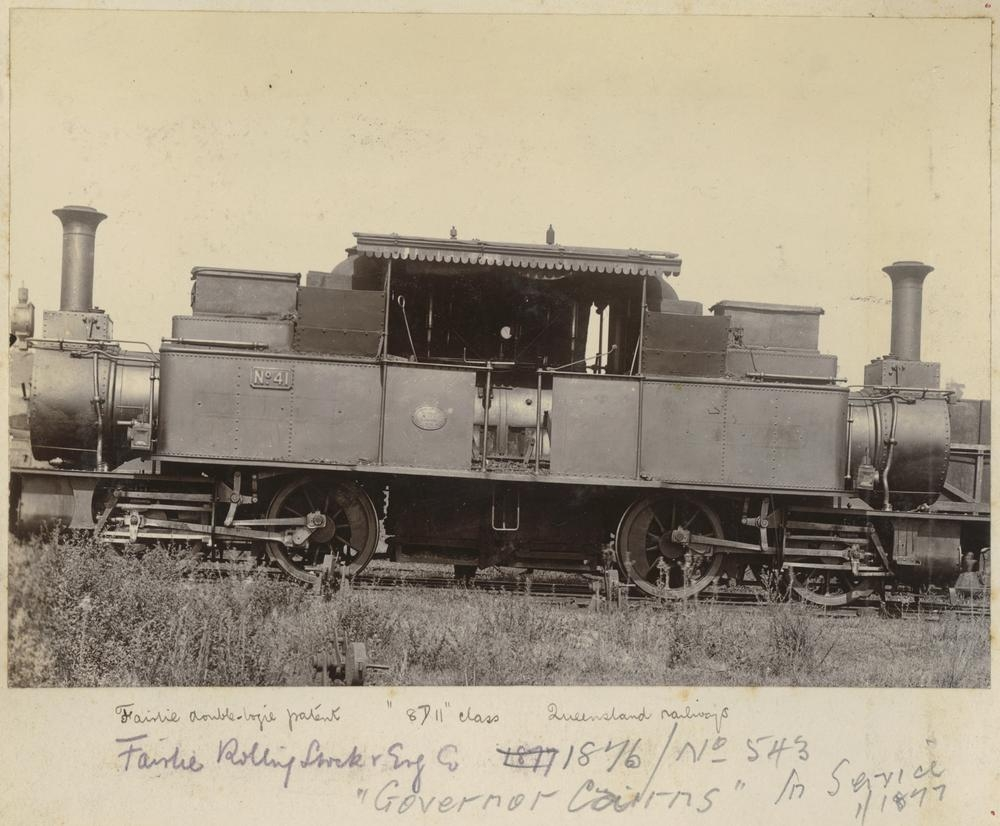
- Class 8D11 No.41, in service from 1877
Type and origin
- Power type: Steam
- Builder: Vulcan Foundry
- Serial number: 734 (as built); 850 (after rebuild)
- Build date: 1874
- Total produced: 1
Specifications
- Configuration
  - Whyte: 0-4-4-0T
- Gauge: 1,067 mm (3 ft 6 in)
- Driver dia.: 3 ft 0 in (914 mm)
- Loco weight: 36 tons
- Fuel type: Coal
- Boiler pressure: 110 psi (758 kPa)
- Cylinders: 4 outside
- Cylinder size: 11 in × 8 in (279 mm × 203 mm)
Performance figures
- Tractive effort: 10,648 lb (4,830 kg)
Career
- Operators: Queensland Railways
- Numbers: 41
- Scrapped: 1902
- Disposition: Scrapped

The Queensland Railways 8D11 class locomotive was a single-member class of 0-4-4-0 double boilered steam locomotive operated by the Queensland Railways.

== History ==
In 1874, the Vulcan Foundry delivered a 0-4-4-0 locomotive to the Norwegian Government Railways, who refused to accept it. After being rebuilt as works number 850, it was trialled by the Queensland Railways on the Ipswich to Toowoomba line and later purchased.

Numbered 41, it was named Governor Cairns. Per Queensland Railway's classification system it was designated the 8D11 class, 8 representing that it had eight driving wheels, D that it was a tank locomotive and the 11 the cylinder diameter in inches. It was scrapped in 1902.
