= Queensland 8D15 class locomotive =

Queensland Railways 8D15 class
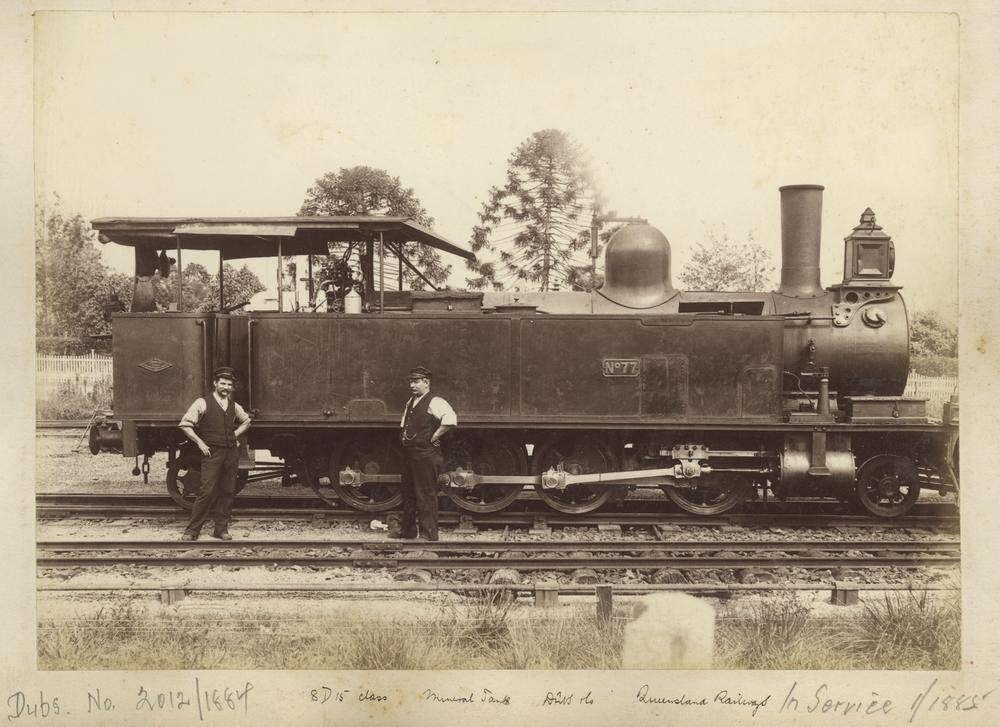
- Class 8D15 No. 77, in service from January 1885
Type and origin
- Power type: Steam
- Builder: Dübs & Co
- Serial number: 2010-2014
- Build date: 1884
- Total produced: 5
- Rebuilder: North Ipswich Railway Workshops
- Rebuild date: 1890/91
- Number rebuilt: 2
Specifications
- Configuration
  - Whyte: 2-8-2T
- Gauge: 1,067 mm (3 ft 6 in)
- Fuel type: Coal
- Cylinders: 2 outside
- Cylinder size: 15 in × 20 in (381 mm × 508 mm)
Career
- Operators: Queensland Railways
- Numbers: 75-77, 134, 135
- Nicknames: Donald Dinnies
- Disposition: All scrapped

The Queensland Railways 8D15 class locomotive was a class of 2-8-2T steam locomotives operated by the Queensland Railways.

== History ==
In 1884 Dübs & Co delivered five 2-8-2T locomotives to the Queensland Railways. Three were delivered to the Southern & Western Railway and one each to the Central (Rockhampton) and Great Northern (Townsville) Railways. The latter was transferred to the Central Railway without use. Per Queensland Railway's classification system they were designated the 8D15 class, the 8 representing the number of driving wheels, the D that it was a tank locomotive, and the 15 the cylinder diameter in inches.

Two were converted to tender engines in 1890/91. All were later reboilered. The tank engines were written off in October 1922, while the tender locomotives, having spent their final years hauling limestone and water trains to Mount Morgan gold mine, followed in 1938.

== Class list ==
Works number	Southern & Western Railway number	Central Railway number	Queensland Railways number	In service	Notes
2010	75		75	February 1885	
2011	76		76	January 1885	
2012	77		77	January 1885	
2013		23 & 2	134	December 1884	entered service as no. 23, withdrawn for modifications, re-entered service as no. 2, converted to tender engine 1891
2014		3	135	November 1884	delivered to Great Northern Railway as no. 13, transferred without use to Central Railway, converted to tender engine 1890
