= Queensland 6D11½ motor class locomotive =

Queensland Railways 6D11½ class
Type and origin
- Power type: Steam
- Builder: Kitson & Co
- Build date: 1882
- Total produced: 3
Specifications
- Configuration
  - Whyte: 0-6-0
- Gauge: 1,067 mm (3 ft 6 in)
- Driver dia.: 2 ft 6 in (762 mm)
- Fuel type: Coal
- Cylinders: 2
- Cylinder size: 11.5 in × 15 in (292 mm × 381 mm)
Career
- Operators: Queensland Railways
- Numbers: 105-107
- Disposition: All scrapped

The Queensland Railways 6D11½ class locomotive was a class of 0-6-0 steam trams operated by the Queensland Railways.

== History ==
In June 1883, Kitson & Co delivered three steam trams and six trailers for a proposed tramway in Brisbane from Ann Street to Petrie Bight. The tramway was not built and with the locomotives considered unsuitable for railway use, they were stored. Per Queensland Railway's classification system they were designated the 6D11½ class, 6D representing they were a tank locomotive with six wheels, and the 11½ the cylinder diameter in inches.

In 1884 one was assembled at North Ipswich Railway Workshops and operated a trial from Ipswich to Brisbane. This confirmed its unsuitability for main line use, and it was instead employed as a shunter in Ipswich and South Brisbane. The other two were assembled and dispatched to Maryborough in 1888. They returned south in 1893 hauling trains on the Redbank-Bundamba Loop Line. All were withdrawn in 1902.
