= Queensland C16 class locomotive =

Class of Australian 4-8-0 locomotives

Queensland Railways C16 class
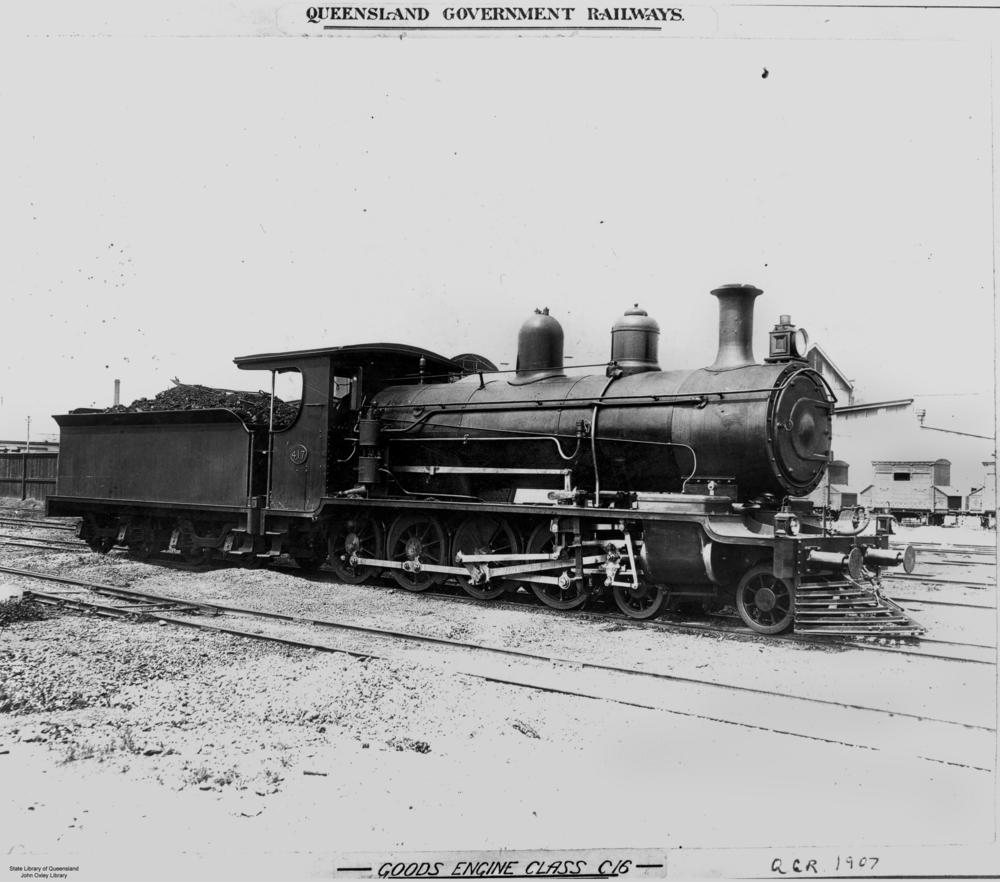
- C16 class, 1907
Type and origin
- Power type: Steam
- Builder: Evans, Anderson, Phelan & Co (41); North Ipswich Railway Workshops (51); Toowoomba Foundry (15); Walkers Limited (45)
- Build date: 1903-1918
- Total produced: 152
Specifications
- Configuration
  - Whyte: 4-8-0
- Gauge: 1,067 mm (3 ft 6 in)
- Leading dia.: 28 in (711 mm)
- Driver dia.: 45 in (1,143 mm)
- Wheelbase: 45 ft 0 in (13.72 m)
- Length: 52 ft 5 1/2 in (15.99 m)
- Height: 12 ft 6 in (3.81 m)
- Axle load: 8.25 long tons (9.24 short tons; 8.38 t)
- Total weight: 80.5 long tons (90.2 short tons; 81.8 t)
- Fuel type: Coal
- Fuel capacity: 8 long tons (8.96 short tons; 8.13 t)
- Water cap.: 3,000 imp gal (14,000 L; 3,600 US gal)
- Firebox
  - Grate area: 18.5 sq ft (1.72 m^{2})
- Boiler pressure: 175 lbf/in^{2} (1,207 kPa)
- Heating surface: 1,093 sq ft (101.5 m^{2})
- Cylinders: 2 outside
- Cylinder size: 16 in × 22 in (406 mm × 559 mm)
Career
- Operators: Queensland Railways
- Numbers: 4, 6-14, 19-22, 31, 34-39, 41, 43, 44, 51, 63-65, 67, 69, 72-74, 96-99, 105-111, 118, 131-133, 139-142, 167-172, 176-178, 395, 414-433, 510-517, 614-675
- Preserved: 106
- Disposition: 1 preserved, 151 scrapped

The Queensland Railways C16 class locomotive is a class of 4-8-0 steam locomotives that was operated by the Queensland Railways.

== Construction ==
Per Queensland Railway's classification system the class was designated the C16 class, C representing they had four driving axles, and the 16 the cylinder diameter in inches. The prototype, N°395, was the first engine to be built by the then new North Ipswich Railway Workshops. It was the only Queensland Railway engine with the exception of the Garratt classes to be fitted with a screw reverser. After successful trials, an order for a further 20 was placed in March 1906 and construction began in earnest. The first engines had an unusual combined number and builder’s plate mounted on the sides of the cab. In early years, the class was often referred to as the Ipswich C16 class to distinguish them from the C16 Baldwin class of the previous century.

Most were painted black to haul livestock trains. Three were painted were specially turned out to haul the heavy Sydney Mail to Wallangarra with 427 painted brown, 428 blue and 429 green until larger locomotives took over this duty. Engines constructed from around 1910 were given indiscriminate numbers by being allocated numbers of scrapped locomotives with the brass number plate recycled.

== Superheating trial ==
In 1920s, superheating was trialled on ten engines. Operation of these superheated engines proved costly despite tests proving savings in coal and water consumption. The principal problem was lubrication of slide valves with the higher temperatures. This caused wear and cutting of the valve and port faces with resultant steam leaks. The original cast iron valves were replaced with bronze ones but produced little improvement. In 1929, it was decided not to superheat any more slide valve engines and those so fitted reverted to saturated steam as boiler renewals became necessary. Eleven engines were loaned to the Commonwealth Railways in 1942 for use on the Central Australia Railway as NMB55-NMB65, returning in 1944.

As saturated engines they were soon replaced on more important duties by their successor, the C17 Class. The engines that survived until the last decade of steam were mainly used for heavy shunting in yards such as Rockhampton where the loads were beyond the capacity of the PB15 class.

== Modifications ==
The class received a number of modifications during their lives. The early engines had sandboxes on the running boards rather than mounted on the boiler. All, except the class leader, had these replaced by a “standard” Baldwin style sandbox on their boilers. Association of American Railroads Master Mechanics smokeboxes commenced being fitted to members of the class in 1945. This greatly improved their performance. All engines remaining in service, except N°106, were similarly altered. These modified engines could be distinguished by their tapered stove pipe chimney.

== Preservation ==
One has been preserved. Initially preserved at Redbank Locomotive Museum, 106 moved to the DownsSteam Tourist Railway & Museum in October 2001 where restoration was completed in 2021.
