= Queensland Railways steam locomotive classification =

Between 1864 and 1958, Queensland Railways ordered 47 types of locomotives for purposes such as freight, passenger and mail train use.

== Classification ==
Until 1889, each of the isolated sections of the Queensland Railways adopted its own locomotive numbering system. With the impending joining of most of the sections, in 1890 a new centralised classification system was adopted to eliminate duplications. Locomotives on the Southern & Western Railway retained their existing numbers, with locomotives on other networks renumbered where there was a duplication.

The classification system consisted of a letter, indicating the number of driving axles, followed by a number, indicating the cylinder diameter in inches and factions of inches. This was confusing for two reasons:

- it differed from the international system.
- it could lead to several classes having the same classification number.

Where classification numbers were duplicated, the classes were usually distinguished by the name of the builder, e.g. A10 Baldwin, A10 Fairlie, A10 Neilson.

In the case of tank locomotives, the number of driving wheels was added as a prefix, e.g. the 6D16 class had six driving wheels. With all four wheel tank locomotives, the prefix was dropped, thus the 6D16 class became the D17 class.

Number of driving axles	International classification	QR classification
1	A	-
2	B	A
3	C	B
4	D	C
3 (Tank locomotive)		D

Improved versions of a similar class were given a second identical letter. For example, the improved version of the D17 was the DD17.

== Classes ==
Classification
Image	Years built	Whyte notation	Designation	Cylinder diameter (inches)	Driving axles	Type	Number in Class
A10 Avonside Locomotive	1864	2-4-0	A10 Avonside	10	2	Freight	4
A10 Neilson Locomotive	1865-1866	0-4-2	A10 Neilson class – Originally B class	10	2	Mixed	13
	1867	2-6-0	B11 class – Originally C class	11	3	Freight	4
	1867	0-6-6-0	Double boilered Cross class	17	6	Freight	
B12 Locomotive	1874-1882	2-6-0	B12 class – Originally E class	12	3	Mixed use	
	1874	0-4-4-0	8D11 class	11	4	Tank	
A10 Fairlie (Vulcan) Locomotive	1877	2-4-0	A10 Fairlie – Originally A class	10	2	Freight	
A10 Ipswich Locomotive	1877	2-4-0	A10 Ipswich	10	2	Freight	
	1878	2-4-0	A11 class – Originally Large A class	11	2	Mixed	
The Central Railway's A12 class number 11, later Queensland Railways no. 167.	1878	4-4-0	A12 (small) class – American Passenger class	12	2	Passenger	3
	1879	4-4-0	A10 Baldwin – Originally American Passenger class	10	2	Passenger	
	1879	2-8-0	C13 Baldwin class	13	4	Freight	
	1879	2-8-0	C15 class – Originally Small Consolation class	15	4	Mixed	
B11 Baldwin No.3 on bridge at Kuranda Railway, Cairns.	1880	2-6-0	B11 Baldwin class	11	3	Freight, then shunting	
Macquarie Harbour breakwater construction, Tasmania. Ex Queensland railways locomotive.	1881	2-4-2T	4D9 class	9	2	Tank (Mixed use)	
	1882-1891	4-4-0	A12 class – Originally American Passenger class	12	2	Passenger	
	1882	0-6-0T	6D11½ Motor class	11 1/2	3	Tank (Freight)	
	1882	0-6-2T	6D13 – formerly F-class	13	3	Tank (Freight)	
	1882	2-8-0	C16 Baldwin class – Large Consolidation class	15	4	Freight	
	1883-1895	4-6-0	B13 class	13	3	Mixed use	
C13 Class Locomotive built by Dubs for the Maryborough Railway	1883	2-8-0	C13 Dubs class	13	4	Freight	
4D10 locomotive	1884-1885	2-4-2T	4D10 class	10	2	Tank (Passenger)	
	1884	2-8-2T	8D15 class	15	4	Tank (Heavy Freight)	
	1889-1899	4-6-0	B15 class	15	3	Freight	
	1894-1895	4-4-0	A14 class	14	2	Passenger	
Abt rack locomotive at Mount Morgan, Queensland, ca. 1890-1900	1898	0-4-2T	4D11½ Abt class	11	2	Tank (Rack Freight)	
PB15 locomotive	1899-1926	4-6-0	PB15 class	15	3	Passenger, Shunter	
QGR, 6D8 1/2 Class, No.5 tank type, Innisfail Tramway, 1921	1900-1923	0-6-0T	6D8½ class	8 1/2	3	Tank (Passenger)	
Abt rack locomotive No. 383 of the Razorback Range, Mount Morgan	1900-1915	0-6-0T	6D13½ Abt class	13 1/2	3	Tank (Rack Freight)	
6D16 locomotive	1901-1902	4-6-2T (originally), 4-6-4T (after rebuild)	6D16 class	16	3	Tank (suburban passenger)	
	1902	0-6-0ST	6D11½ Crane class	11 1/2	3	Saddle Tank (Inspection)	
	1903-1918	4-8-0	C16 class	16	4	Poison trains, mail trains, goods trains	
B13 1/2 398 – nicknamed Pompey – stored at the Ipswich Railway Workshops after being displayed for a long time.	1904-1905	0-6-0T	6D13½ later B13½ class	13 1/2	3	Tank (Shunter)	
B13 Baldwin Locomotive	1908	4-6-0	B13 Baldwin class	13	3	Freight	
B17 Class No.681 at Ipswich Depot	1911	4-6-0	B17 class	17	3	Express Passenger	
	1914	4-8-0	C18 later CC19 class	18 (then 19)	4	Express passenger	
No. 204 the sole member of the B16½ class	1918	2-6-2	B16½ class	16 1/2	3	Passenger	
C17 Locomotive	1920-1953	4-8-0	C17 class	17	4	Mail trains, suburban passenger, freight trains and passenger	
	1922-1935	4-8-0	C19 class	19	4	Express passenger	
Advertisement for QGR, B9 1/2 Class, 0-6-2 narrow gauge tender engine built by John Fowler & Co. 1925	1923-1927	0-6-2	B9½ class	9	3	Freight	
6D17/D17 locomotive	1924-1942	4-6-4T	6D17 later D17 class	17	3	Tank (suburban passenger)	30
B18 1/4 Locomotive	1926-1947	4-6-2	B18¼ class	18 1/4	3	Express passenger, suburban passenger, mail trains and heavy freight	83
	1943	2-8-2	AC16 class	16	4	Mixed use	20
	1943-1945	4-8-2+2-8-4 2′D1′+1′D2′	Australian Standard Garratt	14.5	8	Heavy freight	57
DD17 Locomotive	1948-1952	4-6-4T	DD17 class	17	3	Suburban passenger	12
BB18 1/4 Locomotive	1950-1958	4-6-2	BB18¼ class	18 1/4	3	Express passenger, mail trains, suburban passenger and heavy freight trains	55
Beyer-Garratt	1950-1951	4-8-2+2-8-4	Beyer-Garratt class	13 3/4	8	Freight	30

== See also ==
- List of Australian diesel locomotives
