= Queensland 6D13 class locomotive =

Class of Australian 0-6-2T locomotives

Queensland Railways 6D13 class
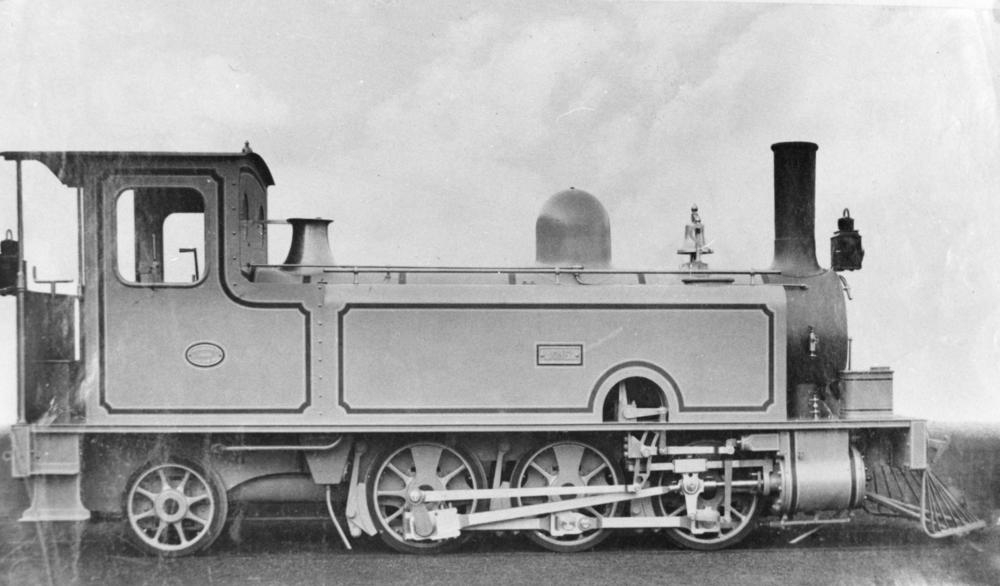
- Lionel built in 1882 for the Queensland Land and Coal Company of Burrum. Later to be numbered No. 70
Type and origin
- Power type: Steam
- Builder: Neilson and Company
- Serial number: 2826, 2827
- Build date: 1882
- Total produced: 2
Specifications
- Configuration
  - Whyte: 0-6-2T
- Gauge: 1,067 mm (3 ft 6 in)
- Fuel type: Coal
- Cylinders: 2 outside
- Cylinder size: 13 in × 18 in (330 mm × 457 mm)
- Valve gear: Walschaerts
Career
- Operators: Queensland Railways
- Numbers: 70, 71
- Disposition: Both scrapped

The Queensland Railways 6D13 class locomotive was a class of 0-6-2T steam locomotives operated by the Queensland Railways.

== History ==
In 1881, the Queensland Land & Coal Company purchased two locomotives for a proposed colliery on the Burrum coalfields near Maryborough that would join with the Queensland Railway’s network at Torbanlea. After the proposal fell through, they were sold to the Queensland Railways, entering service on the Southern & Western Railway. They were used as shunters.

Per Queensland Railway's classification system, they were designated the 6D13 class, the 6 representing the number of driving wheels, the D that it was a tank locomotive, and the 13 the cylinder diameter in inches.

Lionel (No.70) was purchased by Queensland Rail in 1884, and was used for shunting. It gained notoriety when its boiler exploded at Roma Street Station on 29 August 1898. It was repaired and later written off in 1926.

== Class list ==
Works number	Southern & Western Railways number	Queensland Railways number	Name	In service	Notes
2826	70	70	Lionel	February 1884	Written off April 1926
2827	71	71	Lion	March 1884	Written off June 1926
