= Queensland C13 class locomotive =

Class of Australian 2-8-0 locomotives

Queensland Railways C13 class
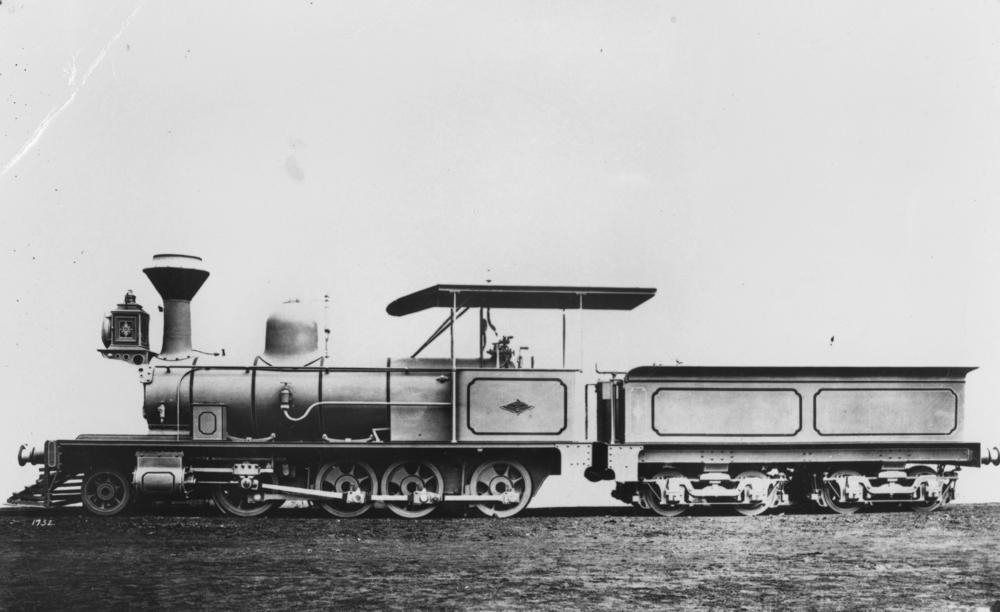
- C13 Dub locomotive built by Dubs for the Maryborough Railway
Type and origin
- Power type: Steam
- Builder: Dübs & Co
- Serial number: 1752-1757
- Build date: 1883
- Total produced: 6
Specifications
- Configuration
  - Whyte: 2-8-0
- Gauge: 1,067 mm (3 ft 6 in)
- Fuel type: Coal
- Cylinders: 2 outside
- Cylinder size: 13 in × 16 in (330 mm × 406 mm)
Career
- Operators: Queensland Railways
- Numbers: 112-117
- Disposition: all scrapped

The Queensland Railways C13 class locomotive was a class of 2-8-0 steam locomotives operated by the Queensland Railways.

== History ==
In 1883, Dübs & Co delivered six 2-8-0 to the Queensland Railways. Per Queensland Railway's classification system they were designated the C13 class, C representing they had four driving axles, and the 13 the cylinder diameter in inches.

Four were delivered to the Maryborough Railway and two to the Bundaberg Railway. They late operated coal trains on the Redbank-Bundamba Loop Line.

== Class list ==
Works number	Maryborough Railway number	Bundaberg Railway number	Queensland Railways number	In service	Notes
1752	12		115	January 1884	Condemned March 1925
1753	10		113	November 1883	Condemned October 1922
1754	11		114	December 1883	Condemned October 1922
1755	9		112	December 1883	Condemned October 1922
1756		4	116	December 1883	Condemned October 1926
1757		5	117	December 1883	Condemned February 1927
