= Queensland 4D11½ Abt class locomotive =

Class of steam locomotive operated by Queensland Railways

Queensland Railways 4D11½ Abt class
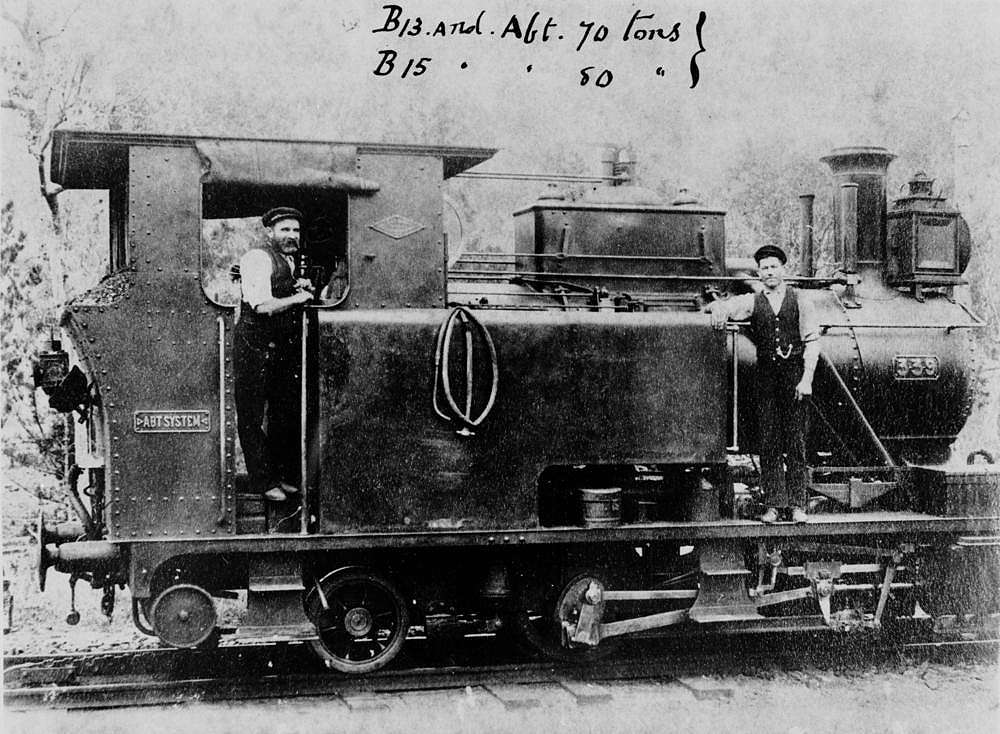
- Mount Morgan track locomotive no. 339 built by Dubs
Type and origin
- Power type: Steam
- Builder: Dübs & Co
- Serial number: 3619, 3620
- Build date: 1898
- Total produced: 2
Specifications
- Configuration
  - Whyte: 0-4-2RT
- Gauge: 1,067 mm (3 ft 6 in)
- Fuel type: Coal
- Water cap.: 600 imp gal (2,700 L; 720 US gal)
- Cylinders: 2
- Cylinder size: 11.5 in × 16 in (292 mm × 406 mm)
- Loco brake: Westinghouse air Le Chatlier
Career
- Operators: Queensland Railways
- Numbers: 339, 340
- Disposition: both scrapped

The Queensland Railways 4D11½ Abt class locomotive was a class of 0-4-2RT steam locomotives operated by the Queensland Railways.

== History ==
In October 1898, two Dübs & Co locomotives entered service. Per Queensland Railway's classification system they were designated the 4D11½ Abt class, the 4 representing the number of driving wheels, the D that it was a tank locomotive, and the 11½ the cylinder diameter in inches.

They were built to assist conventional locomotives up and down a steeply graded rack railway section of the Central Western line at Mount Morgan.

== Class list ==
Number	Works number	In service	Condemned
339	3619	October 1898	September 1916
340	3620	October 1898	December 1922
