= Queensland B11 Baldwin class locomotive =

Class of Australian 2-6-0 locomotives

Queensland Railways B11 class
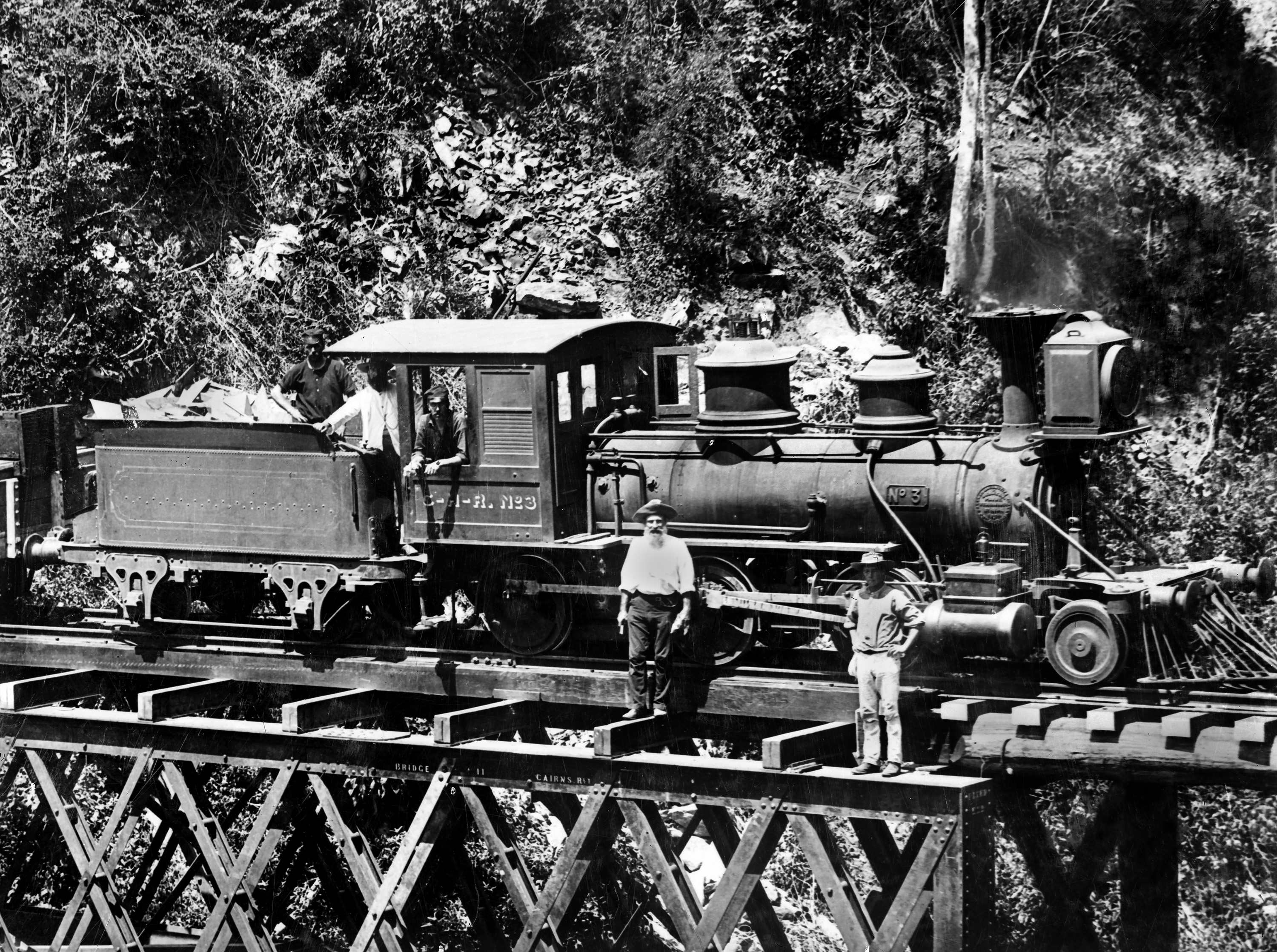
- B11 Baldwin No.3 and Workmen on bridge at Kuranda Railway, Cairns
Type and origin
- Power type: Steam
- Builder: Baldwin Locomotive Works
- Serial number: 4594, 4596
- Build date: 1880
- Total produced: 2
Specifications
- Configuration
  - Whyte: 2-6-0
- Gauge: 1,067 mm (3 ft 6 in)
- Fuel type: Coal
- Cylinders: 2
Career
- Operators: Queensland Railways
- Numbers: 178, 179
- Disposition: both scrapped

The Queensland Railways B11 class locomotive was a class of 2-6-0 steam locomotives operated by the Queensland Railways.

== History ==
In 1880, the Queensland Railways took delivery of two 2-6-0 locomotives built by Baldwin Locomotive Works. Per Queensland Railway's classification system they were designated the B11 class, B representing they had three driving axles, and the 11 the cylinder diameter in inches.

== Class list ==
Works number	Great Northern Railways number	CS number	Bowen Railways number	Queensland Railways number	In service	Notes
4594	5	3		178	1882	Sold to contractor O’Rourke & McSharry, repurchased 1887 as no.3, transferred to Cairns May 1888, hired to contractor John Robb until 1891, sold to Cairns-Mulgrave Tramway 1896, reacquired with tramway September 1911, scrapped August 1913
4596	1		2	179	1880	Sold to contractor J Bashford 1884, repurchased 1886, returned to service August 1889 as no. 23, transferred to Bowen Railway as no. 2, sold to Bowen-Proserpine Tramway July 1909, reacquired with tramway April 1911, sold to Chillagoe Railway & Mining Co. March 1917
