= Queensland 6D13½ Abt class locomotive =

Queensland steam railway locomotive class

Queensland Railways 6D13½ Abt class
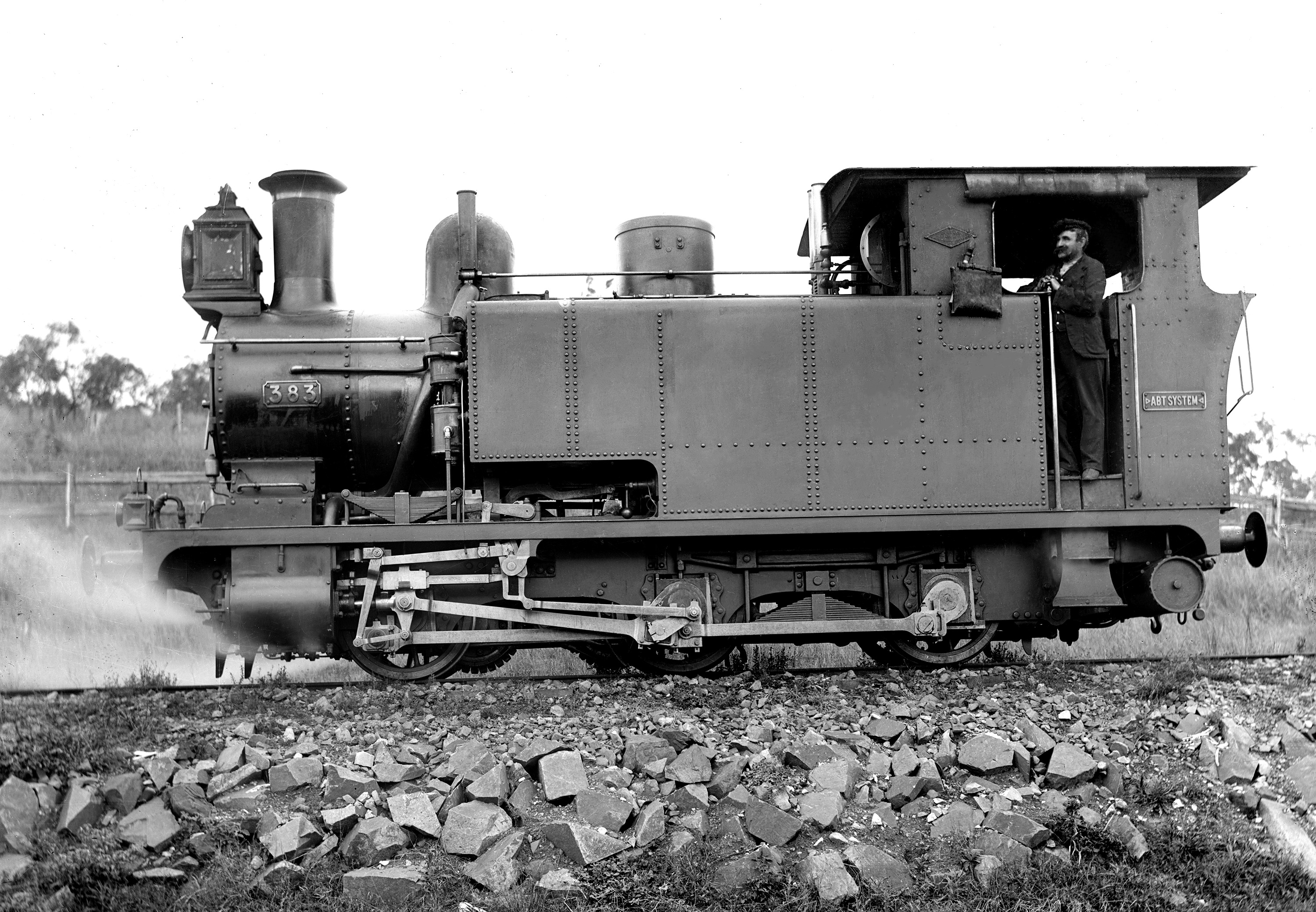
- Abt rack locomotive No. 383 of the Razorback Range, Mount Morgan
Type and origin
- Power type: Steam
- Builder: Dübs & Co (2); North British Locomotive Company (4)
- Build date: 1900-15
- Total produced: 6
Specifications
- Configuration
  - Whyte: 0-6-0RT
- Gauge: 1,067 mm (3 ft 6 in)
- Length: 25 ft 2 in (7.67 m)
- Fuel type: Coal
- Cylinders: 2
Career
- Operators: Queensland Railways
- Numbers: 383, 384, 402, 403, 202, 203
- Disposition: all scrapped

The Queensland Railways 6D13½ Abt class locomotive was a class of 0-6-0RT steam locomotives operated by the Queensland Railways.

== History ==
In October 1900, two Dübs & Co locomotives entered service. Per Queensland Railway's classification system they were designated the 6D13½ Abt class, the 6 representing the number of driving wheels, the D that it was a tank locomotive, and the 13½ the cylinder diameter in inches.

They were built to assist conventional locomotives up and down a steeply graded rack railway section of the Central Western line at Mount Morgan. In 1906 a further pair were built by the North British Locomotive Company with a further two delivered in 1915. One of the original pair was condemned in 1926, with the remaining five withdrawn when the steeply graded section was bypassed in 1952. The only time the locomotives strayed from Mount Morgan was when sent to Rockhampton for overhaul.

== Class list ==
Number	Builder	Works number	Year built	Condemned
383	Dübs & Co	3918	1900	1952
384	Dübs & Co	3919	1900	1952
402	North British Locomotive Company	17224	1906	June 1926
403	North British Locomotive Company	17225	1906	1952
202	North British Locomotive Company	20937	1915	1952
203	North British Locomotive Company	20938	1915	1952
