= Queensland A11 class locomotive =

Class of steam locomotive

Queensland Railways A11 class
Type and origin
- Power type: Steam
- Builder: Vulcan Foundry
- Serial number: 807
- Build date: 1878
- Total produced: 1
Specifications
- Configuration
  - Whyte: 2-4-0
- Gauge: 1,067 mm (3 ft 6 in)
- Fuel type: Coal
- Cylinders: 2
Career
- Operators: Queensland Railways
- Numbers: 37
- Disposition: Scrapped

The Queensland Railways A11 class locomotive was a one locomotive class of 2-4-0 steam locomotive operated by the Queensland Railways.

== History ==
In 1878, the Vulcan Foundry delivered a 2-4-0 locomotive to the Queensland Railways Southern & Western Railway. Per Queensland Railway's classification system it designated the A11 class, A representing that it had two driving axles, and the 10 the cylinder diameter in inches.

== Class list ==
Works number	Southern & Western Railway number	Queensland Railways number	In service	Notes
807	37	37	June 1878	Condemned November 1902
