= Queensland 6D11½ crane class locomotive =

Class of Australian 0-6-0CT locomotives

Queensland Railways 6D11½ class
- Beyer Peacock 0-6-0 saddle tank crane locomotive
Type and origin
- Power type: Steam
- Builder: Beyer, Peacock & Company
- Serial number: 4317, 4318
- Build date: 1902
- Total produced: 2
Specifications
- Configuration
  - Whyte: 0-6-0ST
- Gauge: 1,067 mm (3 ft 6 in)
- Fuel type: Coal
- Water cap.: 250 imp gal (1,100 L; 300 US gal) (as built); 570 imp gal (2,600 L; 680 US gal) (after crane removed)
- Cylinders: 2
Career
- Operators: Queensland Railways
- Numbers: 1, 2
- Disposition: Both scrapped

The Queensland Railways 6D11½ class locomotive was a class of 0-6-0ST steam locomotive operated by the Queensland Railways.

== History ==
In January 1903, two Beyer, Peacock & Company built crane locomotives entered service. Per Queensland Railway's classification system they were designated the 6D11½ class, the 6 representing the number of driving wheels, the D that it was a tank locomotive, and the 11½ the cylinder diameter in inches. Their delivery was delayed after the ship Duke of Sutherland they were aboard ran aground off Lizard Island. Both had their cranes removed in 1911/12.

== Class list ==
Number	Works number	In service	Notes
1	4317	January 1903	Crane removed November 1911, written off April 1927
2	4318	January 1903	Crane removed, written off September 1927
