= Queensland B9½ class locomotive =

Class of Australian 0-6-2 locomotives

Queensland Railways B9½ class
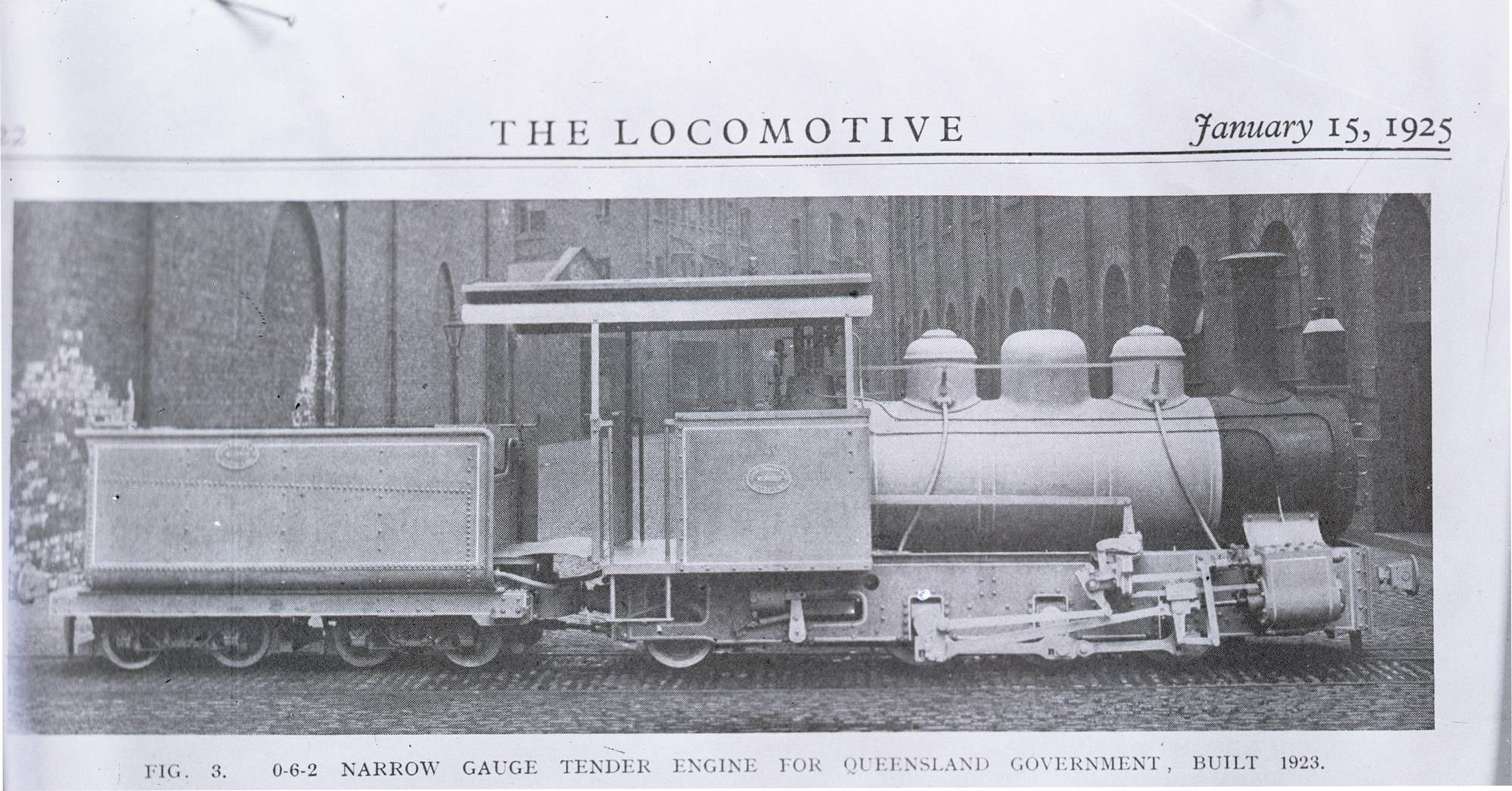
- Advertisement for the B9 1/2 Class
Type and origin
- Power type: Steam
- Builder: John Fowler & Co
- Build date: 1924-27
- Total produced: 3
Specifications
- Configuration
  - Whyte: 0-6-2
- Gauge: 610 mm (2 ft)
- Fuel type: Coal
- Cylinders: 2
Career
- Operators: Queensland Railways
- Numbers: 9-11
- Preserved: 11
- Disposition: 1 preserved, 2 scrapped

The Queensland Railways B9½ class locomotive was a class of 0-6-2 steam locomotives operated by the Queensland Railways.

== History ==
Between 1923 and 1927, John Fowler & Co, Leeds delivered three 0-6-2 locomotives to the Queensland Railways. Per Queensland Railway's classification system they were designated the B9½ class, B representing they had two driving axles, and 9½ the cylinder diameter in inches. They operated on 610 mm (2 ft) Innisfail Tramway, all being withdrawn in the early 1960s. One has been preserved at the Australian Narrow Gauge Railway Museum Society, Woodford.
