= Queensland A12 small class locomotive =

Class of Australian 4-4-0 locomotives

Queensland Railways A12 class
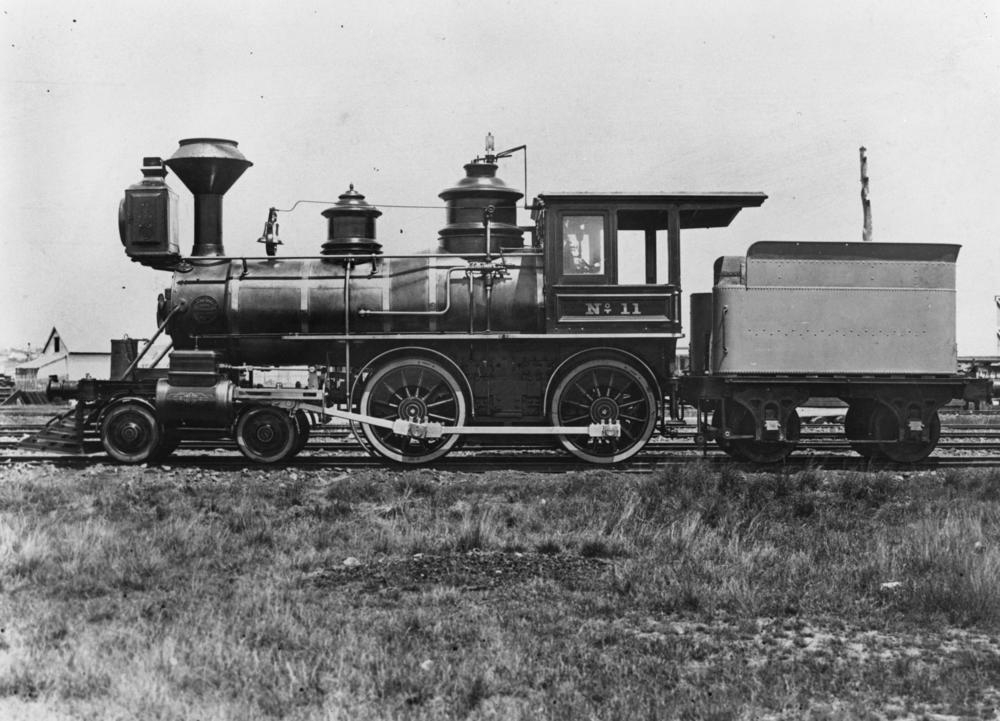
- The Central Railway's A12 class number 11, later Queensland Railways no. 167.
Type and origin
- Power type: Steam
- Builder: Baldwin Locomotive Works
- Serial number: 4197-4199
- Build date: 1878
- Total produced: 3
Specifications
- Configuration
  - Whyte: 4-4-0
- Gauge: 1,067 mm (3 ft 6 in)
- Fuel type: Coal
- Cylinders: 2 outside
- Cylinder size: 12 in × 16 in (305 mm × 406 mm)
Career
- Operators: Queensland Railways
- Numbers: 38, 39, 167
- Disposition: All scrapped

The Queensland Railways A12 class locomotive was a class of 4-4-0 steam locomotives operated by the Queensland Railways.

== History ==
In 1878, the Queensland Railways took delivery of three 4-4-0 locomotives built by Baldwin Locomotive Works. Two entered service on the Southern & Western Railway and one on the Central Railway. Per Queensland Railway's classification system they were designated the A12 class, A representing they had two driving axles, and the 12 the cylinder diameter in inches.

== Class list ==
Works number	Central Railways number	Southern & Western Railway number	Queensland Railways number	In service	Notes
4197	11		167	July 1878	Condemned June 1913
4198		38	38	June 1878	Condemned June 1912
4199		39	39	July 1878	Condemned June 1912
