= Queensland C13 Baldwin class locomotive =

Class of Australian 2-8-0 locomotives

Queensland Railways C13 class
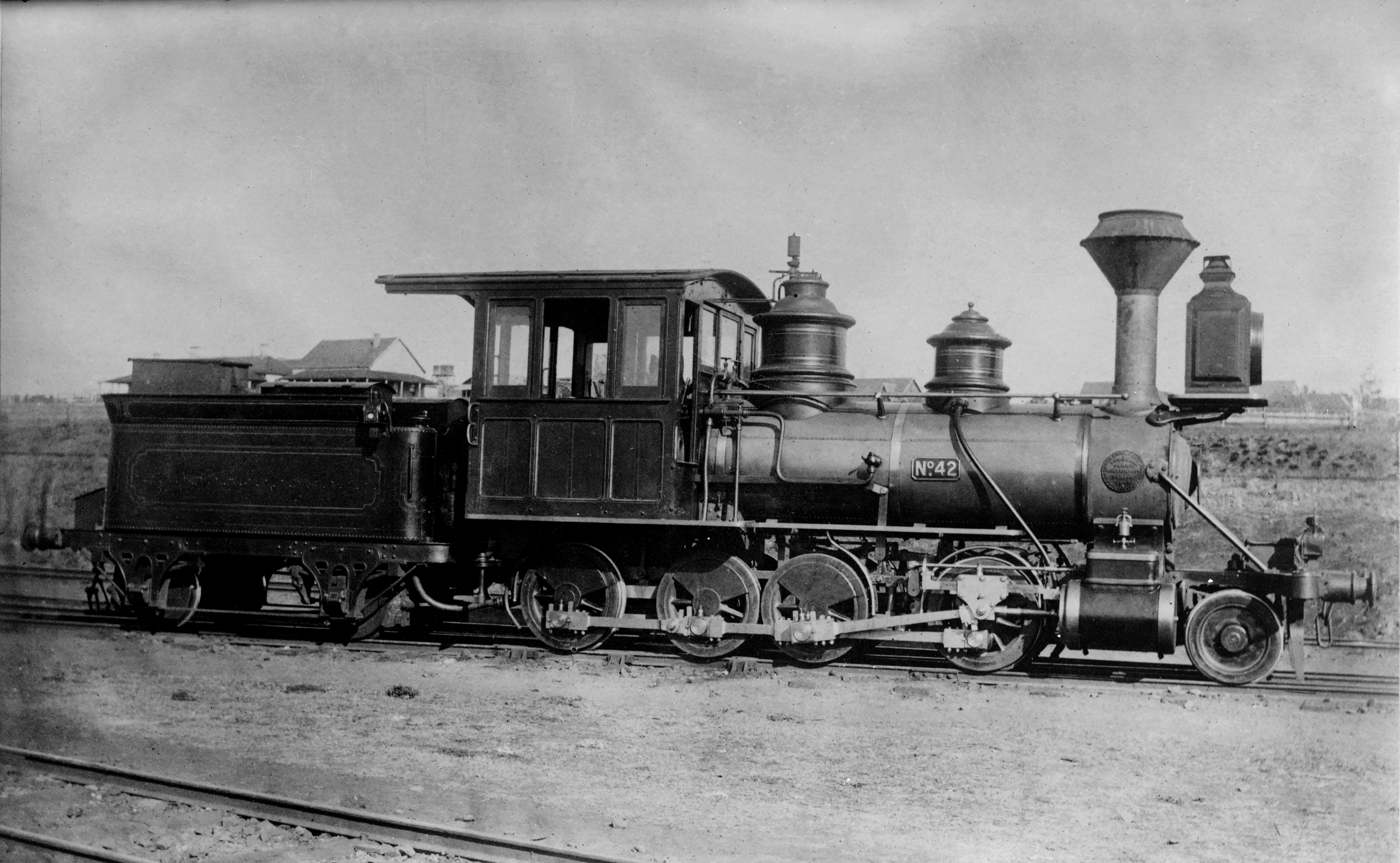
- Queensland Railways C-13 Class No.42
Type and origin
- Power type: Steam
- Builder: Baldwin Locomotive Works
- Serial number: 4598, 4603
- Build date: 1879
- Total produced: 2
Specifications
- Configuration
  - Whyte: 2-8-0
- Gauge: 1,067 mm (3 ft 6 in)
- Fuel type: Coal
- Cylinders: 2 outside
- Cylinder size: 13 in × 14 in (330 mm × 356 mm)
Career
- Operators: Queensland Railways
- Numbers: 43, 118
- Disposition: both scrapped

The Queensland Railways C13 Baldwin class locomotive was a class of 2-8-0 steam locomotives operated by the Queensland Railways.

== History ==
In 1879, the Baldwin Locomotive Works delivered two 2-8-0 to the Queensland Railways’ Southern & Western Railway. Per Queensland Railway's classification system they were designated the C13 class, C representing they had four driving axles, and the 13 the cylinder diameter in inches.

== Class list ==
Works number	Southern & Western Railway number	Bundaberg Railway number	Queensland Railways number	In service	Notes
4598	43		43	June 1880	Written off November 1902
4603	42	1	118	December 1879	Sold 1900 to Gibson & Howes of Bingera Sugar Mill, withdrawn 1946
