= Queensland A10 Avonside class locomotive =

Class of Australian 2-4-0 locomotives

Queensland Railways A10 Avonside class
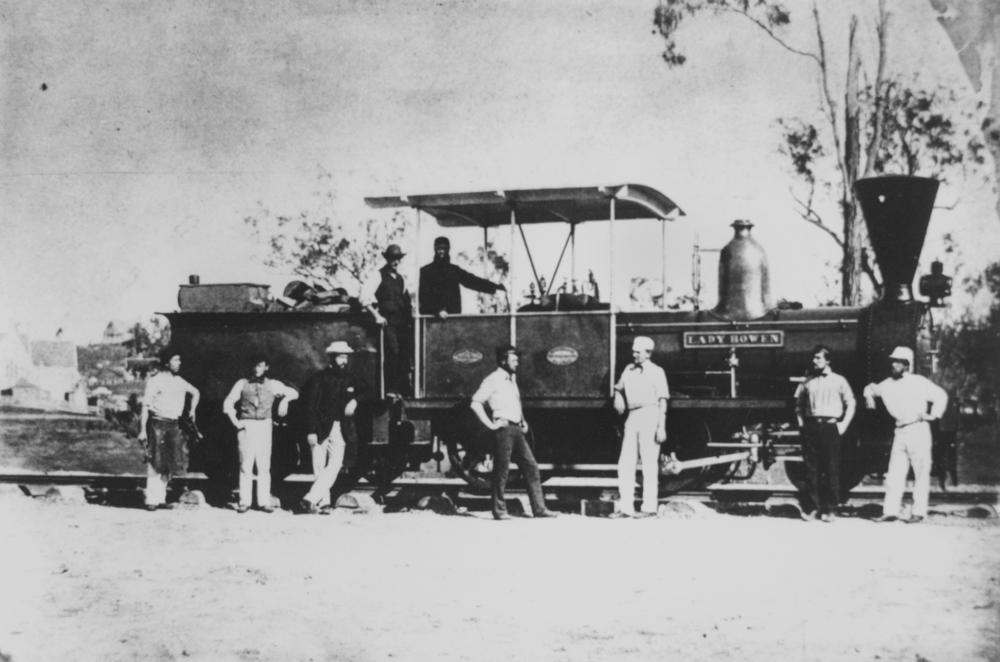
- Lady Bowen circa 1865
Type and origin
- Power type: Steam
- Builder: Avonside Engine Company
- Serial number: 552-555
- Build date: 1864
- Total produced: 4
Specifications
- Configuration
  - Whyte: 2-4-0
- Gauge: 1,067 mm (3 ft 6 in)
- Fuel type: Coal
- Cylinders: 2 outside
- Cylinder size: 10 in × 18 in (254 mm × 457 mm)
Career
- Operators: Queensland Railways
- Numbers: 1-4
- Disposition: all scrapped

The Queensland Railways A10 Avonside class locomotive was a class of 2-4-0 steam locomotives operated by the Queensland Railways.

== History ==
In 1864, the Avonside Engine Company, Bristol built four locomotives for the Queensland Railway. After being built they were dismantled and reassembled at North Ipswich Railway Workshops. Originally classified the A class, per Queensland Railway's classification system they were designated the A10 Avonside class in 1890, A representing they had two driving axles, and 10 the cylinder diameter in inches.

One, 3 Lady Bowen, operated the first Queensland Railways service in 1865 between Grandchester and Ipswich. Initially operating on the Southern & Western Railway out of Ipswich, one was transferred to the Central Railway out of Rockhampton in 1867 and the other three to Maryborough in 1879.

== Class list ==
Works number	Southern & Western Railway number	Maryborough Railway number	Central Railway number	Queensland Railways number	Name	In service	Notes
552	1	1			Premier	January 1865	Transferred to Maryborough May 1880, condemned 1888
555	2	2		108	Faugh-a-Ballagh	January 1865	Transferred to Maryborough January 1880, renumbered 108 1890, sold to contractor Overend & Paterson
554	3	3			Lady Bowen	February 1865	Transferred to Maryborough 1879, condemned 1888
553	4		1	133	Pioneer	February 1865	Transferred to Rockhampton 1867, renumbered 133 1890, withdrawn 1896
