= Queensland B11 class locomotive =

Class of Australian 2-6-0 locomotives

Queensland Railways B11 class
Type and origin
- Power type: Steam
- Builder: Neilson and Company
- Serial number: 1305-1308
- Build date: 1867
- Total produced: 4
Specifications
- Configuration
  - Whyte: 2-6-0
- Gauge: 1,067 mm (3 ft 6 in)
- Fuel type: Coal
- Cylinders: 2 outside
- Cylinder size: 11 in × 18 in (279 mm × 457 mm)
Career
- Operators: Queensland Railways
- Numbers: 36, 109-111
- Disposition: all scrapped

The Queensland Railways B11 class locomotive was a class of 2-6-0 steam locomotive operated by the Queensland Railways.

== History ==
In 1867, the Neilson and Company, Glasgow delivered four 2-6-0 locomotives to the Queensland Railways Southern & Western Railway. Originally classified as the C class, per Queensland Railway's classification system they were redesignated the B11 class in 1890, B representing that they had three driving axles, and the 11 the cylinder diameter in inches.

In 1888, three were transferred to Maryborough. The remaining member on the Southern & Western Railway was renumbered no. 36 to allow the B12 class to be consecutively numbered.

== Class list ==
Works number	Southern & Western Railway number	Maryborough Railway number	Queensland Railways number	In service	Notes
1305	17		36		Written off November 1904
1306	15	4	110		Written off November 1904
1307	16	5	109		Written off November 1904
1308	18	6	111		Written off November 1904
