= Queensland C15 class locomotive =

Class of Australian 2-8-0 locomotives

Queensland Railways C15 class
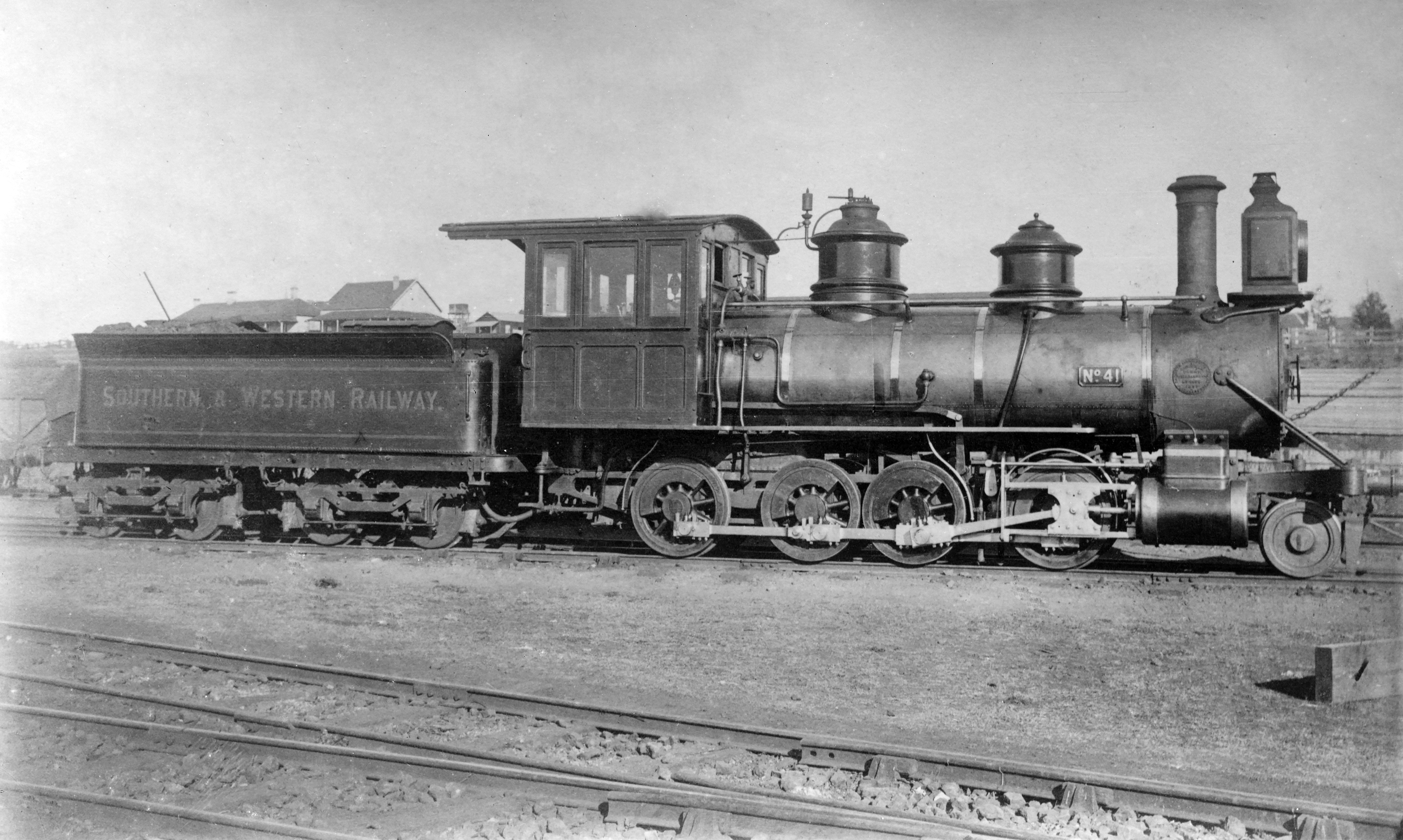
- Queensland Railways C15 Class Locomotive No.41 circa 1879-1886
Type and origin
- Power type: Steam
- Builder: Baldwin Locomotive Company
- Serial number: 4602, 4730
- Build date: 1879
- Total produced: 2
Specifications
- Configuration
  - Whyte: 2-8-0
- Gauge: 1,067 mm (3 ft 6 in)
- Fuel type: Coal
- Cylinders: 2 outside
- Cylinder size: 15 in × 18 in (381 mm × 457 mm)
Career
- Operators: Queensland Railways
- Numbers: 42, 104
- Disposition: all scrapped

The Queensland Railways C15 class locomotive was a class of 2-8-0 steam locomotives operated by the Queensland Railways.

== History ==
In 1879, the Queensland Railway’s Southern & Western Railways took delivery of one Baldwin Locomotive Company 2-8-0 locomotive, being placed in service as no. 41 hauling services up the Main Range.

A similar example as imported jointly by JA Overend and Company and Garget and Company for sections 1 and 2 of the Stanthorpe extension. It was purchased by the Queensland Railways entering service as no. 42. No. 41 was transferred to the Great Northern Railway (Townsville), returning south in 1886 as no. 104. Both were reboilered in 1900. They were similar to the New Zealand Railways T class.

Per Queensland Railway's classification system they were designated the C15 class, the C representing they had four driving axles, and the 15 the cylinder diameter in inches.

== Class list ==
Works number	Southern & Western Railway number	Great Northern Railway number	Queensland Railways number	In service	Notes
4602	41	1	104 (from 1886)	December 1879	Written off 1926
4730	42		42	1881	Written off 1916
