= Queensland C16 Baldwin class locomotive =

Class of Australian 2-8-0 locomotives

Queensland Railways C16 class
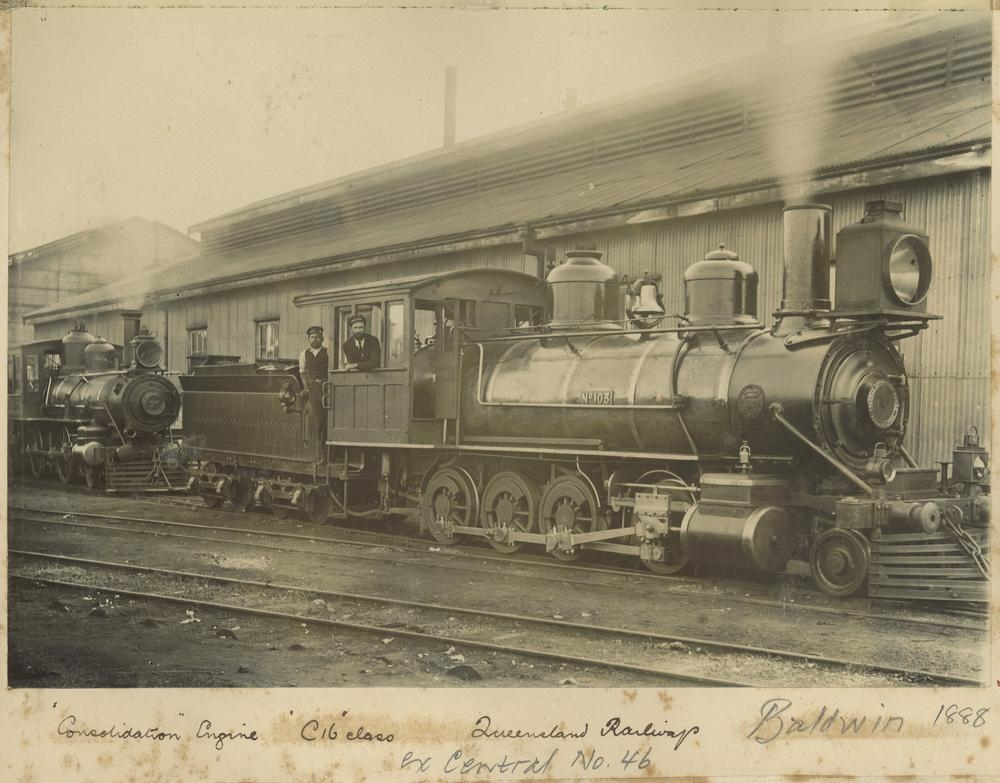
Type and origin
- Power type: Steam
- Builder: Baldwin Locomotive Works
- Serial number: 6112, 6121, 7117
- Build date: 1882
- Total produced: 3
Specifications
- Configuration
  - Whyte: 2-8-0
- Gauge: 1,067 mm (3 ft 6 in)
- Fuel type: Coal
- Cylinders: 2 outside
- Cylinder size: 16 in × 20 in (406 mm × 508 mm)
Career
- Operators: Queensland Railways
- Numbers: 103, 143, 144
- Disposition: all scrapped

The Queensland Railways C16 Baldwin class locomotive was a class of 2-8-0 steam locomotives operated by the Queensland Railways.

== History ==
In 1882, the Baldwin Locomotive Works delivered two 2-8-0 to the Queensland Railways’ Central Railway at Bowen. Per Queensland Railway's classification system they were designated the C16 class, C representing they had four driving axles, and the 16 the cylinder diameter in inches.

A third purchased by contractor O’Rourke & McSharry, was purchased for the Central Railway in December 1887. The latter was sent to North Ipswich Railway Workshops in July 1888 for overhaul, but did not return entering service with the Southern & Western Railway. All were reboilered in 1900. They were transferred to the Maryborough / Bundaberg area hauling limestone trains to the Mount Morgan gold mine. All were withdrawn in the 1920s.

== Class list ==
| Works number | Central Railway number | Southern & Western Railway number | Queensland Railways number | In service | Notes |
|---|---|---|---|---|---|
| 6112 | 15 | | 143 | December 1882 | Written off July 1924 |
| 6121 | 16 | | 144 | December 1882 | Written off March 1925 |
| 7117 | 46 | 103 | 103 | December 1887 | Written off October 1922 |
