= Queensland B17 class locomotive =

Class of Australian 4-6-0 locomotives

Queensland Railways B17 class
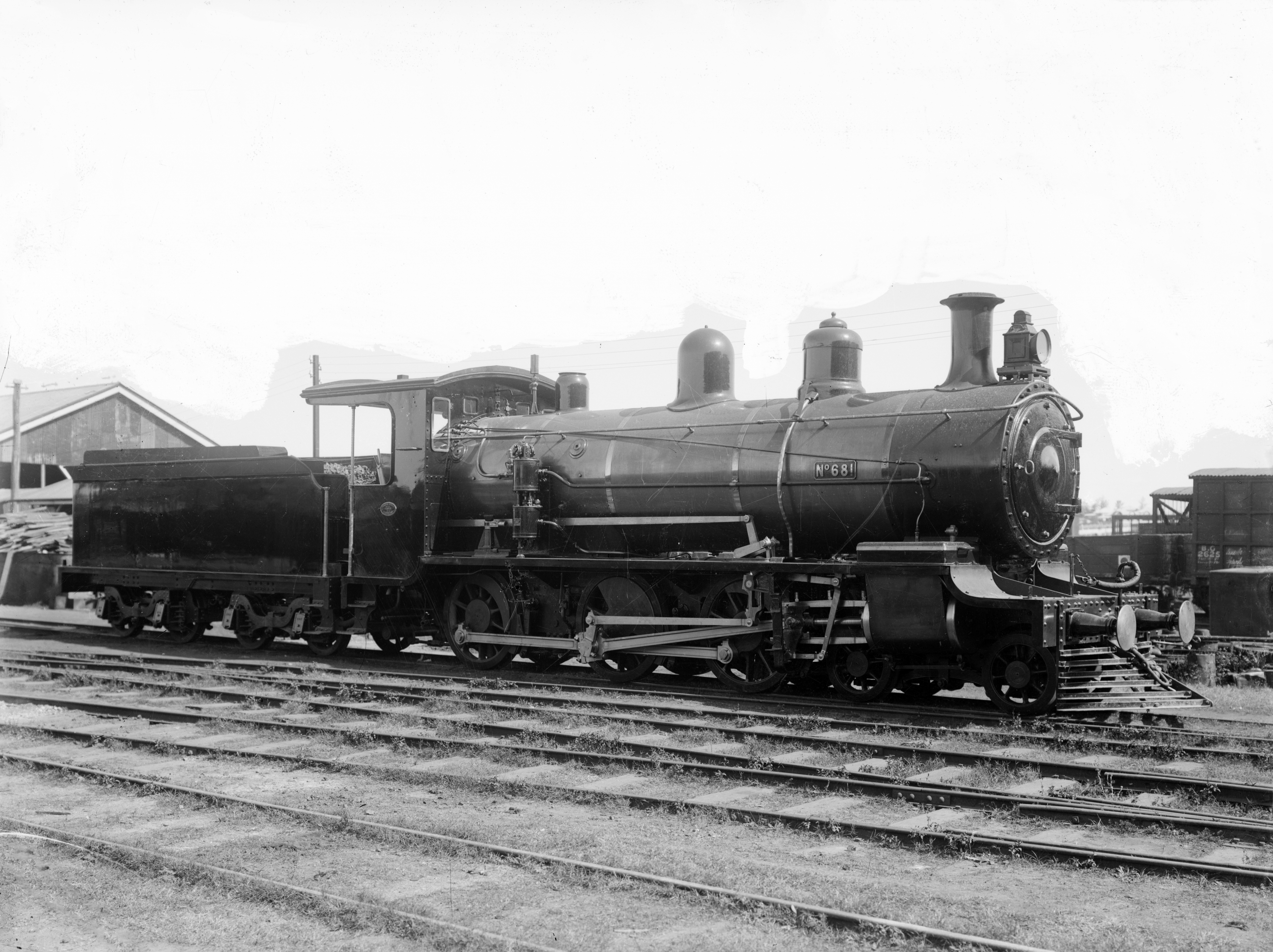
- B17 Class No.681 at Ipswich Depot
Type and origin
- Power type: Steam
- Builder: North Ipswich Railway Workshops
- Build date: 1911
- Total produced: 21
Specifications
- Configuration
  - Whyte: 4-6-0
- Gauge: 1,067 mm (3 ft 6 in)
- Length: 54 ft 2 in (16.51 m)
- Fuel type: Coal
- Cylinders: 2
Career
- Operators: Queensland Railways
- Numbers: 538, 610-613, 676-691
- Disposition: all scrapped

The Queensland Railways B17 class locomotive was a class of 4-6-0 steam locomotives operated by the Queensland Railways.

== History ==
Between May 1911 and May 1914 North Ipswich Railway Workshops built 21 4-6-0 locomotives. Per Queensland Railway's classification system they were designated the B17 class, B representing they had three driving axles, and the 17 the cylinder diameter in inches. In October 1917, 678 was superheated. Although judged a success, no more followed.
