= Queensland A10 Baldwin class locomotive =

Class of Australian 4-4-0 locomotives

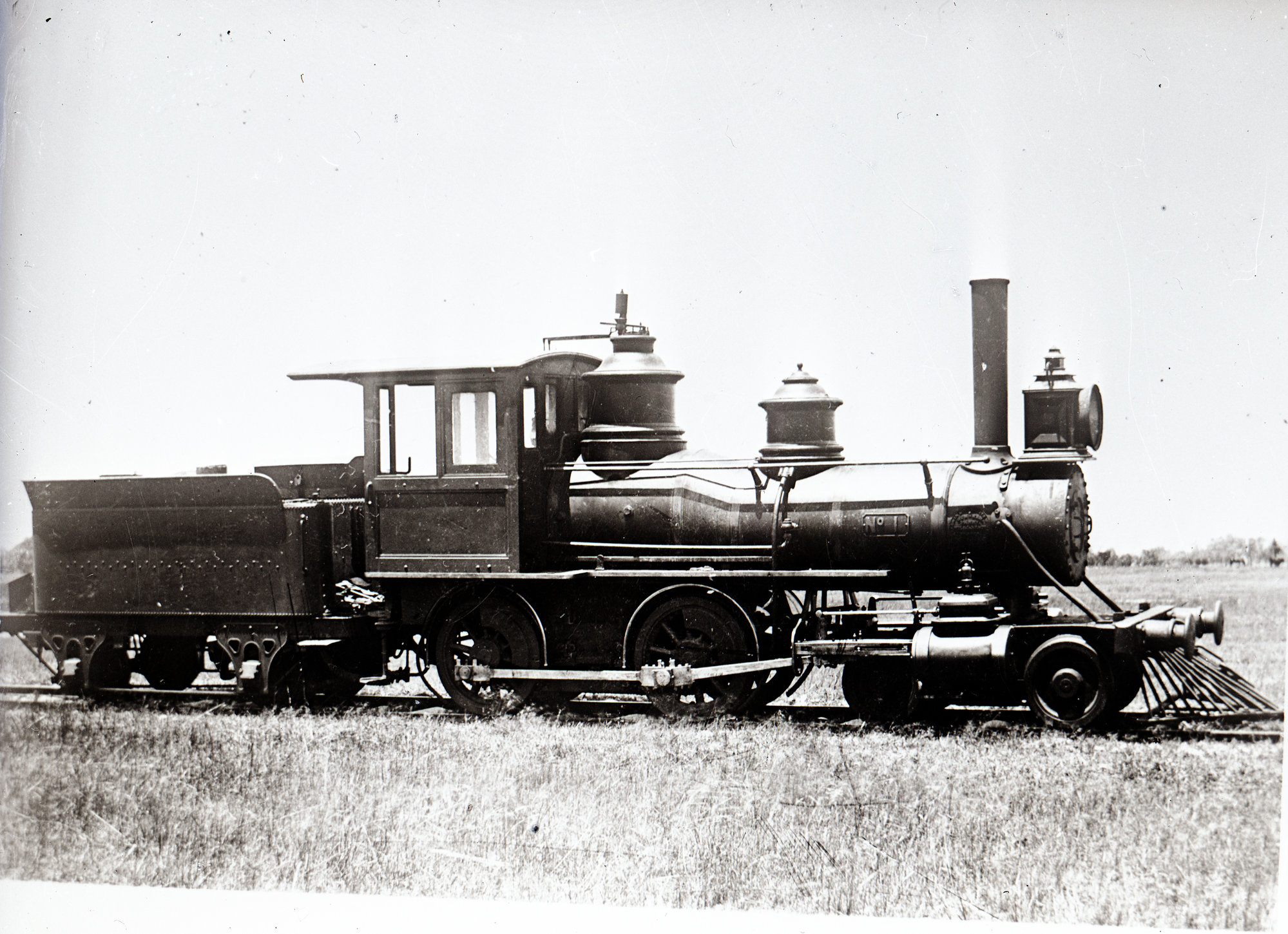
- A10 Baldwin class at Bowen Railway re-numbered as No.1
Type and origin
- Power type: Steam
- Builder: Baldwin Locomotive Works
- Build date: 1879
- Total produced: 2
Specifications
- Configuration
  - Whyte: 4-4-0
- Gauge: 3 ft 6 in (1,067 mm)
Career
- Operators: Queensland Railways
- Class: A10

The A10 Baldwin class steam locomotive was a 4-4-0 locomotive of the Queensland Railways (QR).

The locomotives operated on 3 ft 6 in (1,067 mm) gauge. The “A”, is used to identify the number of coupled wheels, being four coupled wheels for the A10 class, followed by numerals indicating the cylinder diameter of ten inches. Baldwin indicates that the builder was the Baldwin Locomotive Works, United States.

== History ==
There were two Baldwin A10's purchased and they entered service on the Northern Railway (Townsville Region). These small engines were also ordered at a cost of £1,690 each. They entered service as No.2 on the 1 March 1881 and No.3 on the 6 November, 1881. In 1886 No.2 was renumbered No.1 and No.3 became No.2. In 1888, No.1 was transferred to the Bowen Railway as its No.1. In 1890, Nos 1 and 2 were integrated into the Queensland Government Railways (QGR) numbering list as No.2 became QGR No.176 and Bowen Railway No. 1 became QGR No.177 respectively. In 1895, No.177 was condemned at Bowen and No.176 was transferred to that line from the Northern Railway in September 1895. In 1902 No.176 was shown as condemned in the commissioners report.

QR no.	Northern Railway & Bowen Railway (Post 1886) no.	Northern Railway no.
176	2	3
177	1	2

== See also ==
- Rail transport in Queensland
- List of Queensland steam locomotives
