= Queensland A10 Fairlie class locomotive =

Class of Australian 2-4-0 locomotives

Queensland Railways A10 Fairlie class
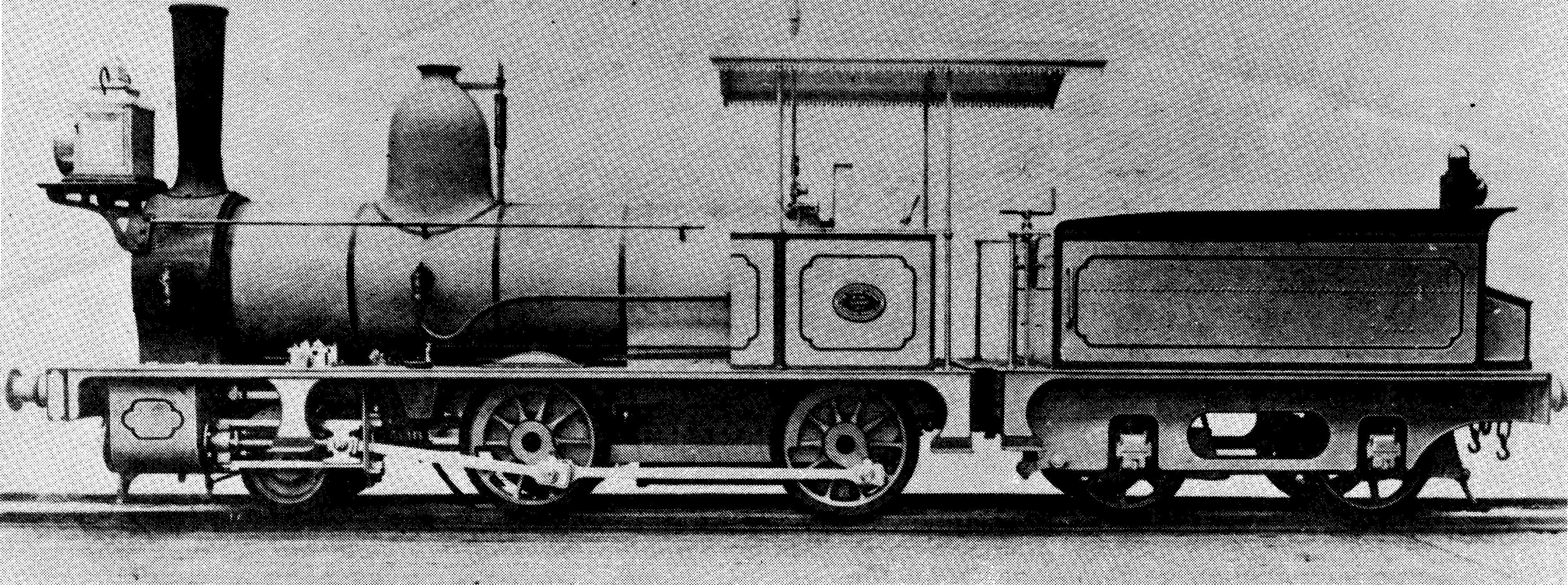
Type and origin
- Power type: Steam
- Builder: Vulcan Foundry
- Serial number: 802–804
- Build date: 1877
- Total produced: 3
Specifications
- Configuration
  - Whyte: 2-4-0
- Gauge: 1,067 mm (3 ft 6 in)
- Driver dia.: 3 ft 0 in (914 mm)
- Fuel type: Coal
- Water cap.: 565 imp gal (2,570 L; 679 US gal)
- Cylinders: 2 outside
- Cylinder size: 10 in × 14 in (254 mm × 356 mm)
Career
- Operators: Queensland Railways
- Numbers: 202-204
- Disposition: All preserved

The Queensland Railways A10 Fairlie class locomotive was a class of 2-4-0 steam locomotives operated by the Queensland Railways.

== History ==
Per Queensland Railway's classification system they were designated the A10 class, A representing they had two driving axles, and the 10 the cylinder diameter in inches. Because other locomotives also had these features, they were designated as the A10 Fairlie class. They were ordered from the Fairlie Engine Company, but were not articulated Fairlie locomotives. They were built under sub-contract by the Vulcan Foundry and both companies gave them works numbers.

The locomotives were delivered to the Central Railway (Rockhampton) in late 1877, entering service numbered 8 to 10. In March 1881, No. 10 was sold only to rail contractor O'Rourke & Co, being repurchased in December 1887. In May 1888, No. 8 was transferred to the Normanton Railway and renumbered no.1, with no.10 following as No. 2 in December 1888 and No. 9 as No. 3 in June 1890.

In 1890, they were integrated into the Queensland Railways numbering list as 202-204. Two of these locos were condemned at Normanton in 1895, No. 203's boiler was separated from the loco at Normanton and sent to the Clarina pump, where it remains derelict, No. 204's boiler was scrapped in 1905 but the frames and wheels remained at Normanton. No. 202 was sold to the Pioneer Mill (a gold ore crushing mill) near Croydon in 1906 and last used about 1915.

The A10 Fairlies were rated to pull 60 long tons (67 short tons; 61 t) up a 1 in 50 (2%) grade.

| Vulcan Foundry works number | Fairlie Engine Company works number | Central Railway number | Normanton Railway number | Queensland Railways number |
|---|---|---|---|---|
| 802 | 602 | 8 | 1 | 202 |
| 803 | 604 | 10 | 2 | 203 |
| 804 | 603 | 9 | 3 | 204 |

== Preservation ==
Because of the isolation of the Normanton Railway, none were scrapped. Croydon Shire Council salvaged 202 and made an assessment on restoring it.
