= Ghana Railways 1851 class =

Class of diesel–electric locomotives

Type and origin
- Power type: Diesel-electric
- Builder: English Electric-AEI Traction
- Serial number: 3850–3859, 3864–3869
- Build date: 1969–1970
- Total produced: 16
Specifications
- Configuration
  - UIC: Co-Co
- Gauge: 1,067 mm (3 ft 6 in)
- Bogies: English Electric bolsterless, low weight transfer, interlinked
- Wheel diameter: 3 ft 1 1/2 in (0.953 m)
- Length: 48 ft 6 in (14.78 m) over headstocks
- Width: 9 ft 0 in (2.74 m)
- Height: 12 ft 7 1/2 in (3.848 m)
- Axle load: 13.6 long tons (13.8 t; 15.2 short tons)
- Loco weight: 81.5 long tons (82.8 t; 91.3 short tons)
- Fuel type: Diesel
- Fuel capacity: 770 imp gal (3,500 L)
- Prime mover: English Electric 12CSVT Mk II
- Engine type: Four stroke
- Aspiration: Turbocharged, intercooled
- Generator: EE822
- Traction motors: Six EE537
- Cylinders: V12
- Cylinder size: 10 in × 12 in (254 mm × 305 mm)
- Loco brake: Air
- Train brakes: Vacuum
Performance figures
- Maximum speed: 60 miles per hour (97 km/h)
- Power output: 2,025 hp (1,510 kW) gross, 1,850 hp (1,380 kW) net
- Tractive effort
  - Starting: 65,000 lbf (290 kN)
  - Continuous: 50,000 lbf (220 kN) at 11.5 mph (20 km/h)
Career
- Operators: Ghana Railway Corporation
- Number in class: 16
- Numbers: 1851-1866
- Disposition: 16 scrapped

The Ghana Railways 1851 class were diesel-electric locomotives built by English Electric-AEI Traction for the Ghana Railways in 1969–1970.

== Description ==
The design of the 1851 class combined a narrow body, similar to a hood unit, with full-width cabs at each end to provide good visibility. The engine, electrical and control equipment was essentially the same as fitted to the British Rail Class 37 as well as a number of other export locomotives.

The main frame consisted of two fabricated box-section longitudinal members with fabricated box-section cross members. These box sections were sealed to form the fuel tank in the centre of the locomotive.

The bogies were cast steel with axles fully compensated with underslung beams acting on long-travel coil springs. Side bearers were totally enclosed with oil lubrication. The bogies were linked with lateral spring-controlled intercouplers, reducing track stresses and flange wear in curves. To maximise rail adhesion the locomotives were fitted with a wheelslip prevention system and the bogies were designed to reduce weight transfer.

== History ==
By 1999 only two remained in service. In 2003 just one, 1864, remained in storage at New Takoradi, but had been scrapped by 2007.
