= CP Class 1400 =

Portuguese diesel locomotive

Class 1400
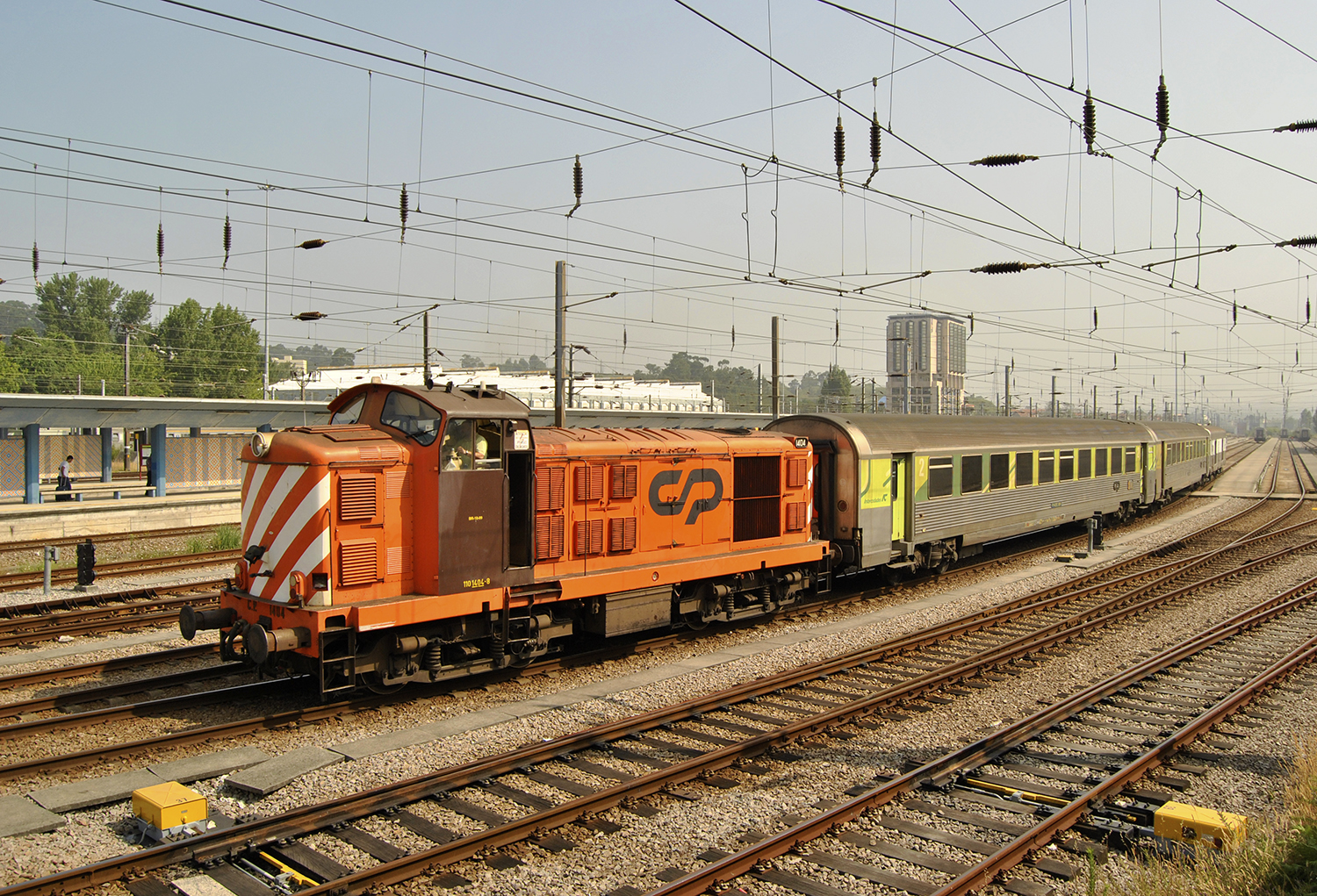
- CP 1404 pulls a regional passenger train at Porto in 2013
Type and origin
- Power type: Diesel-Electric
- Designer: English Electric
- Builder: Vulcan Foundry; Sorefame
- Serial number: 1401 to 1467
- Build date: 1967-1969
- Total produced: 67
Specifications
- Configuration
  - UIC: Bo - Bo
- Gauge: 1,668 mm (5 ft 5 21/32 in) Iberian gauge
- Wheel diameter: 950 mm (new)
- Length: 12.720 m
- Width: 3.260 m
- Height: 4.355 m
- Axle load: 16.3 ton
- Loco weight: 64.4 ton
- Fuel type: Diesel
- Fuel capacity: 1.878 ton
- Lubricant cap.: 0.38 ton
- Coolant cap.: 0.47 ton
- Sandbox cap.: 0.47 ton
- Prime mover: English Electric 8CSVT
- RPM range: 850 rpm (max)
- Engine type: Four-stroke diesel engine
- Displacement: 304.8 mm
- Alternator: 1 x EE819/9H
- Traction motors: 4x EE548/3A
- Head end power: No
- Cylinders: 8
- Cylinder size: 254.0 mm
- Transmission: Electric (DC)
- Gear ratio: 72:15
- MU working: 3
- Train heating: No
- Loco brake: Westinghouse Brake & Signal Company
- Train brakes: Air and Vacuum
- Safety systems: Davies & Metcalfe / Maschinenfabrik Oerlikon
- Couplers: UIC
Performance figures
- Maximum speed: 105 km/h (65 mph)
- Power output: 1,328 hp
- Tractive effort
  - Starting: 16,100 Kg
  - Continuous: 14,200 Kg @ 19 Km/h
Career
- Operators: Comboios de Portugal, Medway, Takargo and Somafel
- Class: Class 1400
- Preserved: 0
- Current owner: Comboios de Portugal, Medway, Takargo and Somafel

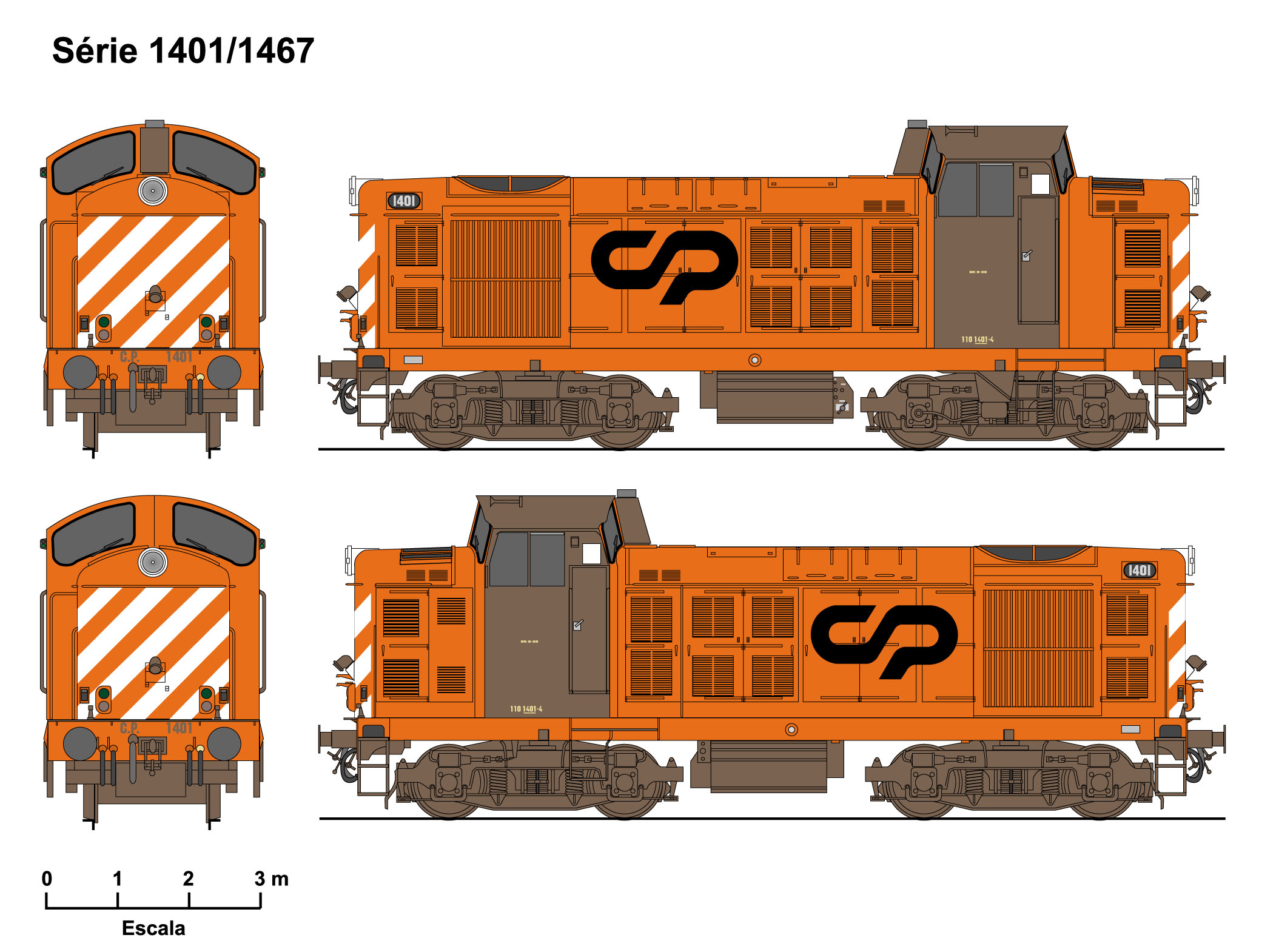
Line diagram of Class 1400 locomotives

The CP Class 1400 are a series of 67 diesel-electric locomotives built for the Portuguese Railways (CP) between 1967 and 1969. They have a top speed of 105 km/h.

They were ordered primarily to replace steam locomotives then still in use on CP. Designed and engineered by English Electric, they are closely modelled mechanically on the British Rail Class 20 locomotives but using a more powerful intercooled 1,330 bhp 8CSVT version of the Class 20's 8SVT engine. The locomotives were designed for the 1,668 mm (5 ft 5 21/32 in) Iberian gauge and larger loading gauge than possible in United Kingdom. The first ten were built in England at the Vulcan Foundry in Newton-le-Willows, with the remaining locomotives assembled in Portugal by Sorefame. The locomotives share many components with the larger and more powerful Class 1800.

During the early years of the 21st century, some were sold for further service in Argentina, but as of 2012 many remain in service with CP.
