= D34 =

D34 may refer to:

- Akaflieg Darmstadt D-34, a German sailplane
- BHP Port Kembla D34 class, a class of diesel locomotives
- Brazilian destroyer Mato Grosso (D34), a Mato Grosso-class destroyer of the Brazilian Navy
- D34 road (Croatia)
- HMS Diamond (D34), a D-class destroyer of the Royal Navy
- HMS Velox (D34), a V-class destroyer of the Royal Navy
- LNER Class D34, a class of British steam locomotives
- Tarrasch Defense, a chess opening
- d34, a die with 34 sides
