= 1800 class =

1800 class or Class 1800 may refer to:

- CP Class 1800, diesel-electric locomotives
- Queensland Railways 1800 class rail motor
