= Queensland Railways 1270 class =

Australian Co′Co′ diesel-electric locomotives

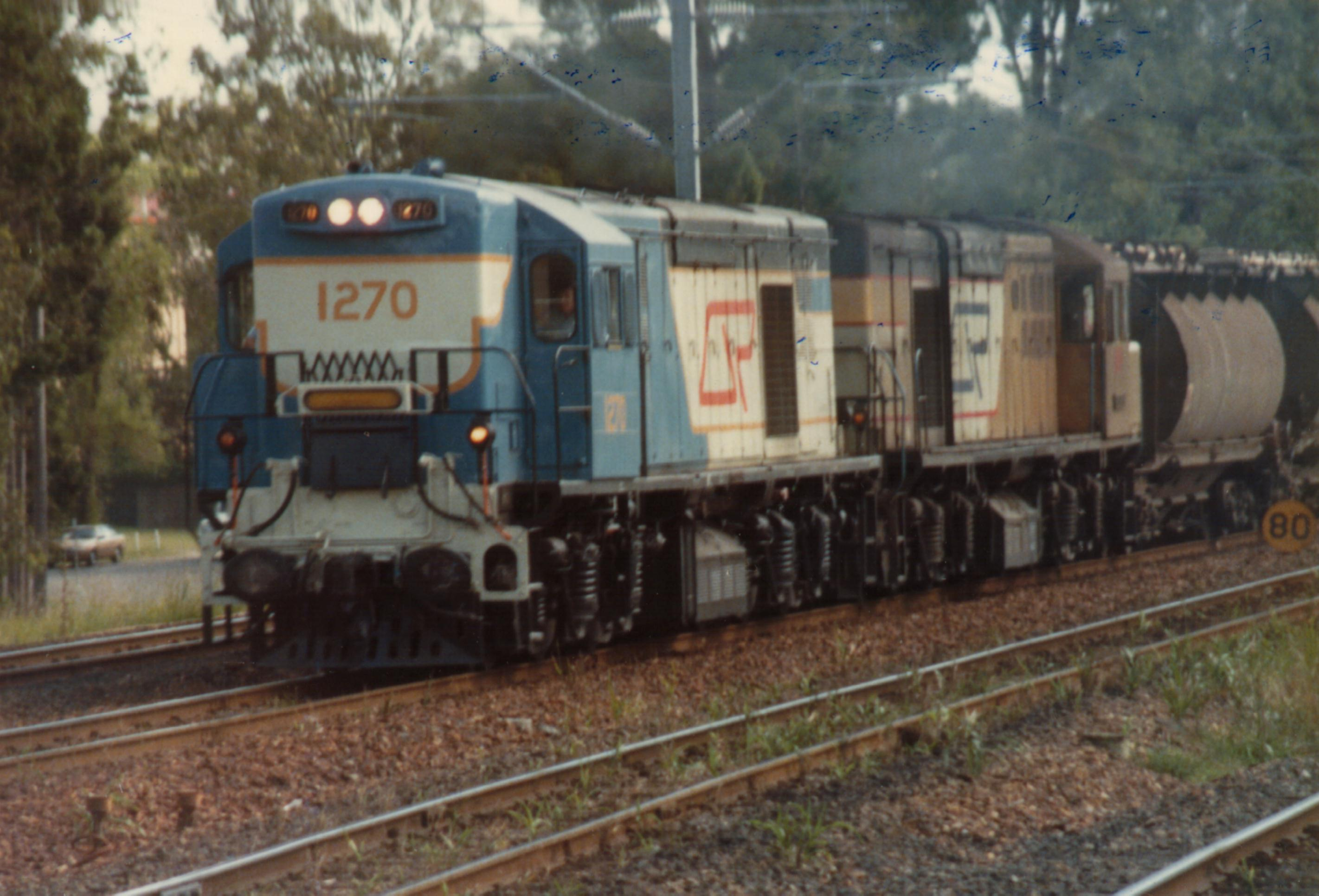
- 1270 and 1281 in Auchenflower in November 1985
Type and origin
- Power type: Diesel-electric
- Builder: English Electric, Rocklea
- Build date: 1964–1966
- Total produced: 30
Specifications
- Configuration
  - Commonwealth: Co-Co
- Gauge: 1,067 mm (3 ft 6 in)
- Loco weight: 85 t (84 long tons; 94 short tons)
- Fuel type: Diesel
- Prime mover: English Electric 12SVT Mk II
- RPM range: 450–850
- Engine type: four stroke, four valves per cylinder
- Aspiration: turbocharged
- Generator: English Electric 822
- Traction motors: English Electric 525 (1270-1281); English Electric 548 (1282-1299)
- Cylinders: 12 vee
Performance figures
- Maximum speed: 80 km/h (50 mph)
- Power output: 1,145 kW (1,540 hp)
- Tractive effort: 272 kN (61,000 lbf) (1270-1281); 300 kN (67,000 lbf) (1282-1299)
Career
- Operators: Queensland Railways
- Number in class: 30
- Numbers: 1270-1299
- First run: 1964
- Last run: 1989
- Preserved: 1270, 1281
- Disposition: 2 preserved, 28 scrapped

The 1270 class were a class of diesel locomotive built by English Electric, Rocklea for Queensland Railways between 1964 and 1966.

== History ==
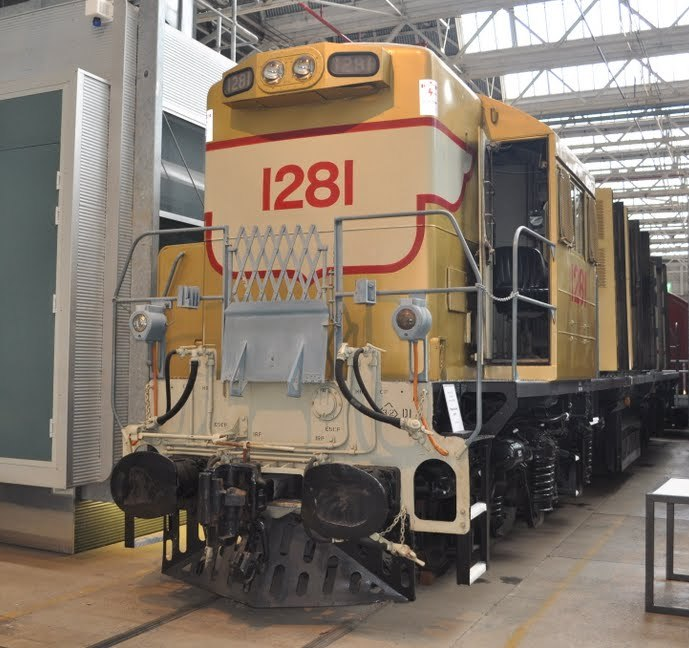
1281 Century at the Workshops Rail Museum, North Ipswich in October 2011

The 1270 class was devised by English Electric engineer Stan Lyons, based on the body design of North American road switcher but using the same engine and generator as the 1250 class. The first 12 units had the same English Electric 525 traction motors as the 1250 class. The remaining units had improved English Electric 548 traction motors with a slightly higher tractive effort. The final six units had dynamic brakes.

In 1965, 1281 was named Century and painted in a commemorative gold and white livery to mark the centenary of the first railway in Queensland.

They were used on grain trains between the Darling Downs and Brisbane, ore trains on the Mount Isa line and coal trains on the Moura line. With higher power diesel locomotives becoming available in the 1970s, the 1270s were moved to general freight.

== Withdrawal & disposal ==
The 1270 class were displaced from coal traffic with the electrification of coalfields lines from 1986. All were withdrawn between 1987 and 1989. Two units were retained by the Queensland Rail Heritage Division and the remainder were scrapped.

== Fleet summary ==
Number	Serial number	In service	Withdrawn	Scrapped	Notes
1270	A.092	26 October 1964	24 November 1988		Queensland Rail Heritage Division, stored
1271	A.090	9 November 1964	19 January 1989	October 1991	
1272	A.091	23 November 1964	18 November 1989	January 1992	
1273	A.093	7 December 1964	8 November 1988	October 1991	
1274	A.094	21 December 1964	18 January 1989	October 1991	
1275	A.095	7 January 1965	30 December 1988	September 1991	
1276	A.098	23 April 1965	17 January 1989	November 1991	
1277	A.099	30 April 1965	23 January 1989	November 1991	
1278	A.100	13 May 1965	17 November 1988	September 1991	
1279	A.101	21 May 1965	19 November 1988	November 1991	
1280	A.102	22 June 1965	18 November 1988	November 1991	
1281	A.103	30 July 1965	4 January 1989		Named Century. Queensland Rail Heritage Division, Workshops Rail Museum
1282	A.108	6 November 1964	17 November 1987	October 1991	
1283	A.113	21 February 1966	29 October 1988	November 1991	
1284	A.107	7 December 1965	21 November 1988	October 1991	
1285	A.106	26 November 1965	31 October 1988	January 1992	
1286	A.112	4 February 1966	16 January 1989	October 1991	
1287	A.115	18 March 1966	30 December 1988	November 1991	
1288	A.114	7 April 1966	21 November 1988	October 1991	
1289	A.117	22 April 1966	22 December 1988	October 1991	
1290	A.119	29 April 1966	14 November 1988	November 1991	
1291	A.120	13 May 1966	25 September 1989	November 1991	
1292	A.122	3 June 1966	17 November 1988	November 1991	
1293	A.123	10 June 1966	16 November 1988	January 1992	
1294	A.126	17 June 1966	22 December 1988	October 1991	
1295	A.127	1 July 1966	4 January 1989	September 1991	
1296	A.128	15 July 1966	5 April 1988	October 1991	
1297	A.129	28 July 1966	10 August 1987	December 1989	
1298	A.130	12 August 1966	16 January 1989	November 1991	
1299	A.131	12 August 1966	21 January 1988	October 1991	
