= New Zealand DI class locomotive =

New Zealand DI Class
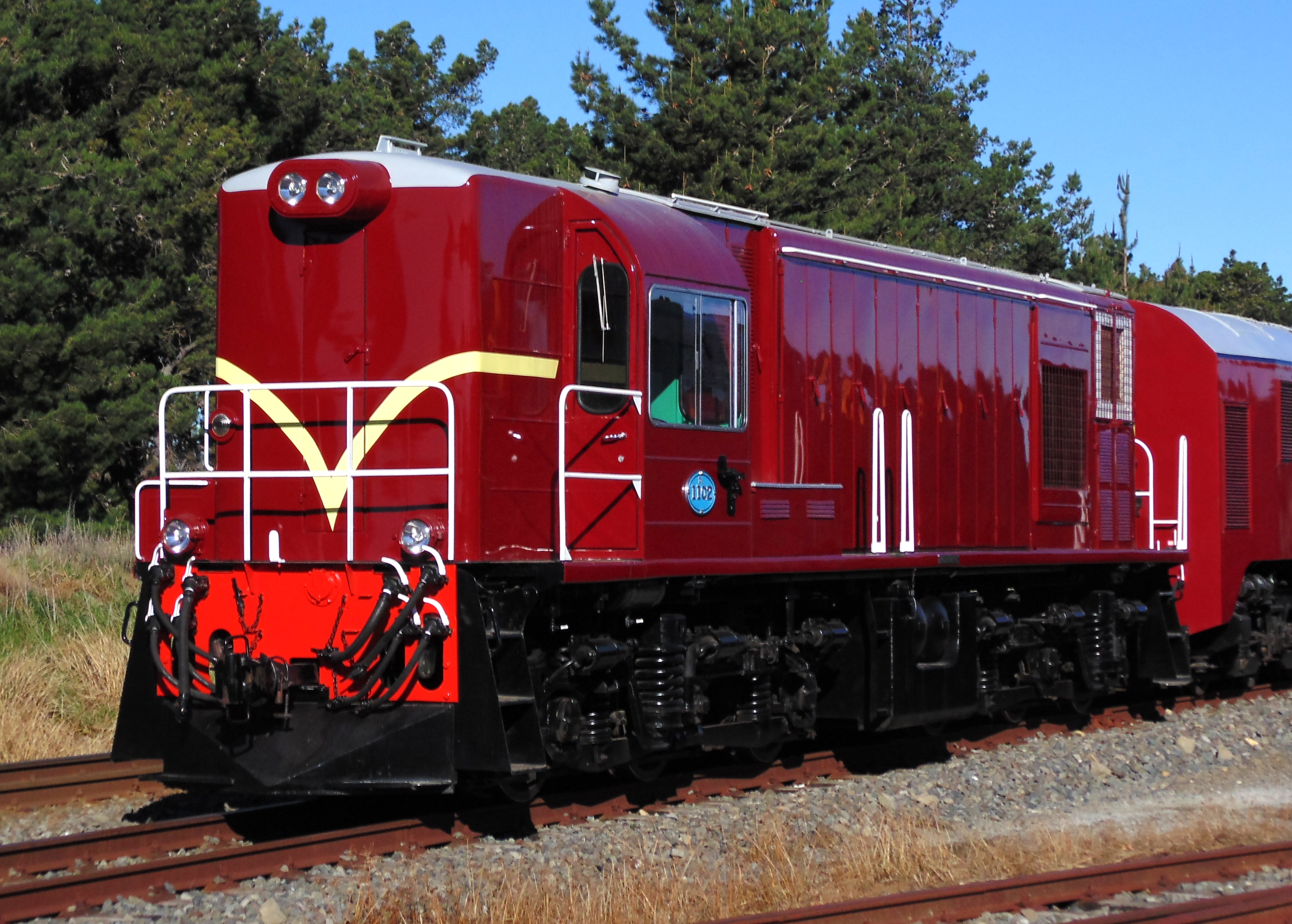
- Preserved locomotive D^{I} 1102 in Waipara in 2018.
Type and origin
- Power type: Diesel-Electric
- Builder: English Electric; Rocklea works, Queensland, Australia
- Build date: 1966
Specifications
- Configuration
  - UIC: Co-Co
- Gauge: 1,067 mm (3 ft 6 in)
- Wheel diameter: 3 ft 1 1/2 in (0.953 m)
- Minimum curve: 330 ft (100.584 m)
- Wheelbase: 33 ft 6 in (10.211 m) total, 11 ft 6 in (3.505 m) bogie
- Length: 42 ft (12.802 m) over headstocks
- Width: 8 ft 6 in (2.591 m)
- Height: 11 ft 8 1/2 in (3.569 m)
- Axle load: 10 1/2 long tons (10.7 t; 11.8 short tons)
- Loco weight: 63 long tons (64.0 t; 70.6 short tons)
- Fuel type: Diesel
- Fuel capacity: 500 imp gal (600 US gal; 2,300 L)
- Prime mover: English Electric 6CSRKT Mk II
- RPM range: 450 - 850 rpm
- Engine type: four stroke, four valves per cylinder
- Aspiration: turbocharged, intercooled
- Generator: EE827/9A
- Traction motors: Six EE540/1A
- Cylinders: 6 Inline
- Cylinder size: 10 in × 12 in (254 mm × 305 mm)
- MU working: 110V, ten notch
- Loco brake: Air, dynamic
- Train brakes: Air
Performance figures
- Maximum speed: 60 miles per hour (97 km/h)
- Power output: 1,012 hp (750 kW) gross, 928 hp (690 kW) net
- Tractive effort: 29,500 lbf (131.2 kN) at 9 mph (10 km/h)
Career
- Number in class: 5
- Numbers: 1100 - 1104 (original); 1808 - 1843 (TMS)
- Locale: All of New Zealand
- First run: April 1966
- Last run: May 1989
- Disposition: 4 scrapped 1 preserved

The New Zealand DI class locomotive (Note: Following the introduction of TMS in 1979, the class classification was capitalised, whereas previously the second letter was a smaller capital letter, that is D^{I}) was a class of diesel-electric locomotive in New Zealand. They were built by English Electric at their plant in Rocklea, Queensland in Australia. The class is very similar to the Queensland Railways 1620 class locomotives. At the time of their introduction, the class was seen as an alternative to the D^{B} class for use on lightly laid secondary and branch lines, more so in the South Island. The World Bank financed introduction of the Japanese built DJ class in 1968, which ensured that no further D^{I} class locomotives were purchased by New Zealand Railways.

== History ==
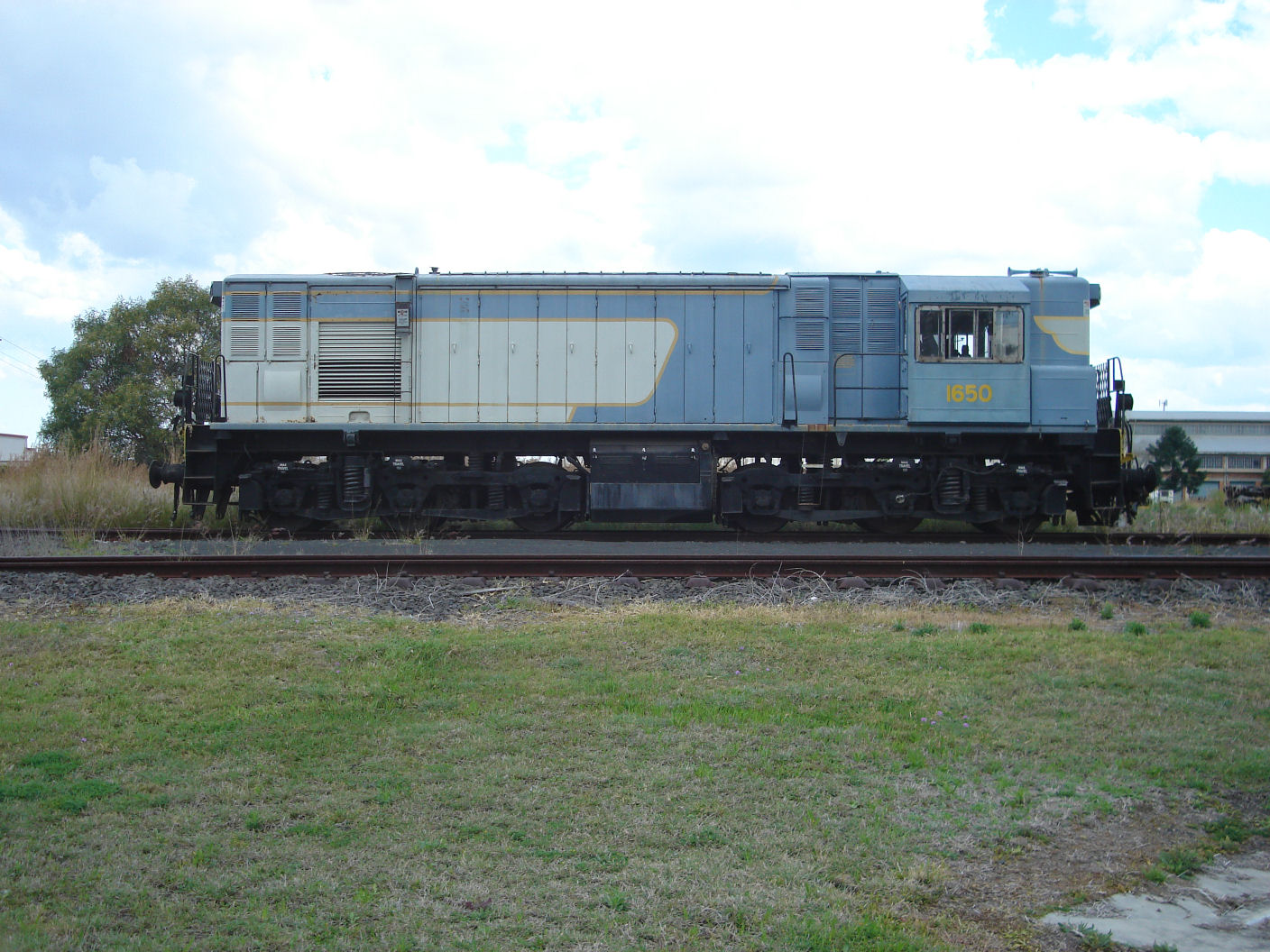
The QR 1620 class, produced after the D^{I} class, were very similar to the New Zealand locomotives.

The D^{I} class were an evolution of the Queensland Railways 1600 class built by English Electric at their Rocklea, Queensland plant. The D^{I} class featured an American-style high front hood. Queensland Railways (QR) took an interest in the NZR design and were impressed by the characteristics of the locomotives. Like NZR, QR was in the process of phasing out steam locomotives, and like NZR required a diesel locomotive able to operate on lightly laid branch lines. QR placed an order with English Electric for locomotives that would be based on the features of the D^{I} class, which would become Queensland Railways 1620 class.

== Service ==
Three members of the class originally operated in the South Island, mainly on the Main North Line between Christchurch and Picton, while the other two members started life in the upper North Island. In May 1969, all members were transferred to work in the Bay of Plenty area on the lightly laid track there.

After the Kaimai Tunnel opened in 1978, all five members were transferred to the South Island for service in the Dunedin area. The class performed sterling service on the hilly Dunedin - Palmerston section of the Main South Line, and were also used to haul the Makareao branchline stone trains to Makareao due to their full adhesion Co-Co wheelset arrangement. Members of the class occasionally made trips to Invercargill and were sometimes used on the Otago Central Line.

=== Renumbering ===
In 1979, the computerised Traffic Monitoring System (TMS) was introduced, and the locomotives were renumbered as 1808, 1814, 1820, 1837 and 1843 respectively.

=== South Island ===
They remained in Dunedin until 1984 - 1986, when they went north to Wellington and Napier mainly being used for shunting duties. The locomotives were also used on revenue and special passenger services over the years of their operation.

== Disposal ==
=== Withdrawals ===
The first withdrawn from service was DI 1837 in January 1986 due to a fractured piston that had caused major engine damage, moving to Hutt Workshops late February 1987 for storage. 1808 and 1814 were then laid up in April 1988. DI 1843 was withdrawn in May 1988 after a collision with a milk tanker truck in a level crossing accident near Ōtaki. 1808 was subsequently returned to service to replace 1843, until it suffered a major main generator failure in April 1989. The remaining member of the class in service, 1820, was withdrawn in May 1989. DIs 1814, 1837 and 1843 were scrapped at Hutt Workshops in March 1989, while 1808 was stripped of useful components in May 1991 by the Diesel Traction Group for spares for 1820.

=== Preservation ===
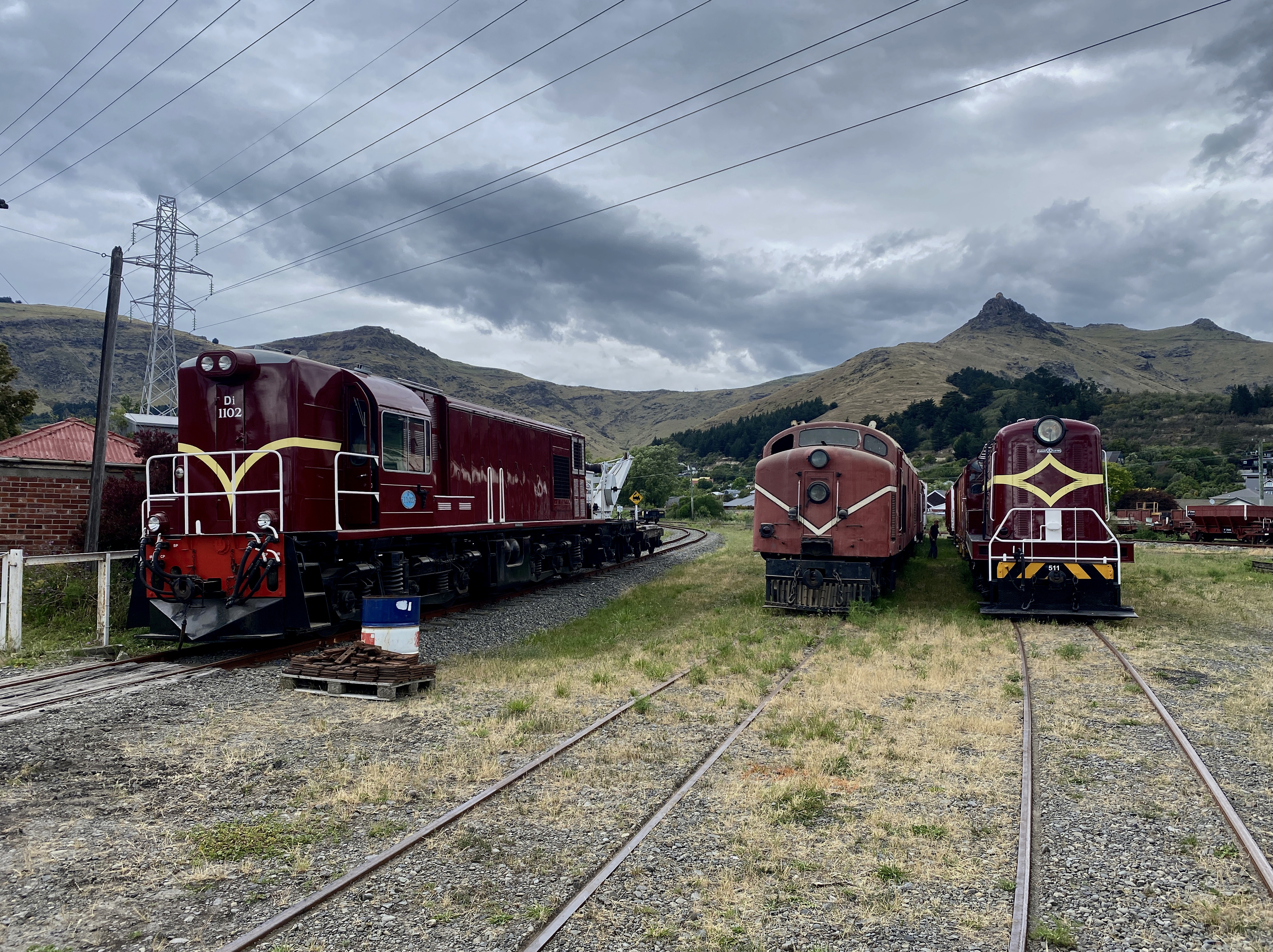
DTG fleet at Ferrymead, D^{I} 1102 (DI1820) is on the left.

DI1820 was purchased by the Diesel Traction Group in 1989, and transferred to their base at the Ferrymead Heritage Park in September 1992. The locomotive was restored from 2009 to 2018, and has since been renumbered back to D^{I} 1102. It was mainline certified in September 2018.
