= British Rail Class D3/11 =

Type and origin
- Power type: Diesel-electric
- Builder: Swindon Works
- Order number: Swindon Lot 346
- Build date: 1948
- Total produced: 6
Specifications
- Configuration
  - Whyte: 0-6-0DE
  - UIC: C
- Gauge: 4 ft 8 1/2 in (1,435 mm)
- Wheel diameter: 4 ft 0 1/2 in (1.232 m)
- Minimum curve: 3.5 chains (70 m)
- Wheelbase: 11 ft 6 in (3.51 m)
- Length: 29 ft 1 1/2 in (8.88 m)
- Width: 9 ft 0 in (2.74 m)
- Height: 12 ft 5 5/8 in (3.80 m)
- Loco weight: 46.45 long tons (47.20 t)
- Fuel capacity: 659 imp gal (3,000 L; 791 US gal)
- Lubricant cap.: 65 imp gal (300 L; 78 US gal)
- Coolant cap.: 140 imp gal (640 L; 170 US gal)
- Prime mover: English Electric 6KT
- Generator: English Electric 801B
- Traction motors: English Electric 506B, 2 off
- MU working: Not fitted
- Train heating: None
- Loco brake: Air
- Train brakes: None
Performance figures
- Maximum speed: 20 mph (32 km/h)
- Power output: Engine: 350 bhp (260 kW), At rail: 194 hp (145 kW)
- Tractive effort: 38,500 lbf (171.3 kN)
Career
- Operators: British Railways
- Class: D3/11; later 3/11
- Numbers: 15101–15106
- Axle load class: Route availability 5
- Retired: 1967
- Disposition: All scrapped

British Rail Class D3/11 were six diesel shunters designed by the Great Western Railway but completed by its successor, British Railways, in 1948. Ordered on Swindon Lot 364, they were intended to be given GWR numbers 502–7, but were delivered to British Railways as nos. 15101–6.
