= Queensland Railways 1620 class =

Australian diesel-electric locomotives

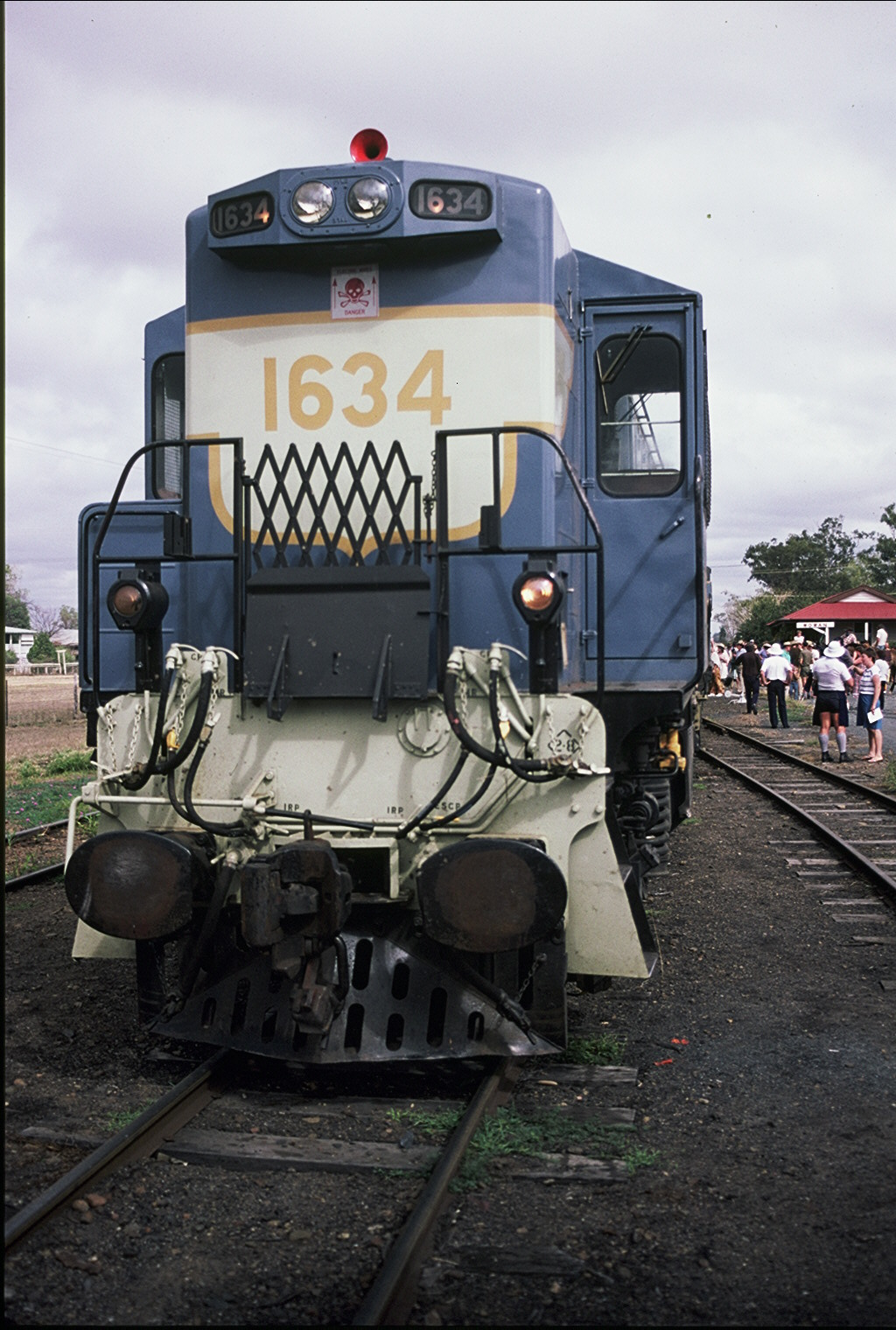
- 1634 at Wowan in August 1987
Type and origin
- Power type: Diesel-electric
- Builder: English Electric, Rocklea
- Build date: 1967-1969
- Total produced: 34
Specifications
- Configuration
  - UIC: Co-Co
- Gauge: 1,067 mm (3 ft 6 in)
- Length: 13.84 m (45 ft 5 in)
- Loco weight: 63 t (62 long tons; 69 short tons)
- Fuel type: Diesel
- Prime mover: English Electric 6CSRKT mark 2
- Engine type: four stroke, four valves per cylinder
- Aspiration: turbo, intercooled
- Generator: English Electric 827
- Traction motors: English Electric 540
- Cylinders: 6
- Cylinder size: 10in by 12in
- MU working: 110V, stepless electro-pneumatic throttle
- Loco brake: straight air
- Train brakes: air
Performance figures
- Maximum speed: 80 km/h (50 mph)
- Power output: 755 kW (1,012 hp) gross
Career
- Operators: Queensland Railways
- Number in class: 34
- Numbers: 1620-1653
- First run: 1967
- Preserved: 1620, 1632, 1639. 1649, 1650, 1651
- Disposition: 6 preserved, 10 exported, 18 scrapped

The 1620 class was a class of diesel locomotives built by English Electric, Rocklea for Queensland Railways between 1967 and 1969.

The 1620 class locomotives are similar to the New Zealand Railways DI class, also built at the Rocklea works.

== History ==
The 1620 class was an evolution of the 1600 class being fitted with a hood nose. They operated in Central and North Queensland as well as hauling commuter trains in Brisbane. The class was withdrawn in the mid 1990s with some sold to John Holland and exported to Malaysia and The Philippines.

Malaysia: 1647 was seen at Lafarge cement works at Padang Jawa, near Kuala Lumpur mid-Jan-2026. The loco is stored undercover alongside the Port Klang to KL mainline, but appears to be out of service. Co-located at the same time was English Electric (‘Stephenson') Vulcan Works - No D926 0-6-0DH shunter, operational status unknown.

Another 1620 class loco (apparently 1644) and still operational with DMIA (Dhaya Maju Infrastructure) as DMIA8007, pending spares as of mid-Jan-2026. Located at Serendah, near Kuala Lumpur alongside the KL to Ipoh mainline.

Six have been preserved:

- 1620 retained as part of the Queensland Rail Heritage Fleet at the Workshops Rail Museum, North Ipswich, restored for main line operation
- 1632 leased to the Mary Valley Rattler, Gympie.
- 1639 leased to the Mary Valley Rattler, Gympie.
- 1649 leased to the Mary Valley Rattler, Gympie.
- 1650 by the Australian Railway Historical Society, stored at Redbank Railway Workshops
- 1651 at Redbank Workshops

== Status table of preserved locomotives ==
Number	In service	Withdrawn	Owner	Location	Notes
1620	01/1967	1991	QR Heritage	Ipswich Workshops	Stored pending complete rewiring of electrical systems. Unlikely to be operational for the foreseeable future.
1632	07/1967	1991	Mary Valley Rattler	Gympie	Operational. Used as a replacement when a steam locomotive is not available.
1639	10/1967	1991	Mary Valley Rattler	Gympie	Stored in Gympie Yard as a source for spare parts.
1649	02/1969	1991	Mary Valley Rattler	Gympie	Stored in Gympie Yard as a source for spare parts.
1650	03/1969	1991	QR Heritage	Ipswich Workshops	Donated to QR Heritage by ARHS(QLD). Stored in good condition awaiting completion of a restoration initiated by the previous custodian.
1651	03/1969	1991	QR Heritage	Ipswich Workshops	Donated to QR Heritage by ARHS(QLD). Used as a source for spare parts.
