= South Australian Railways 800 class =

Class of Australian diesel-electric locomotives

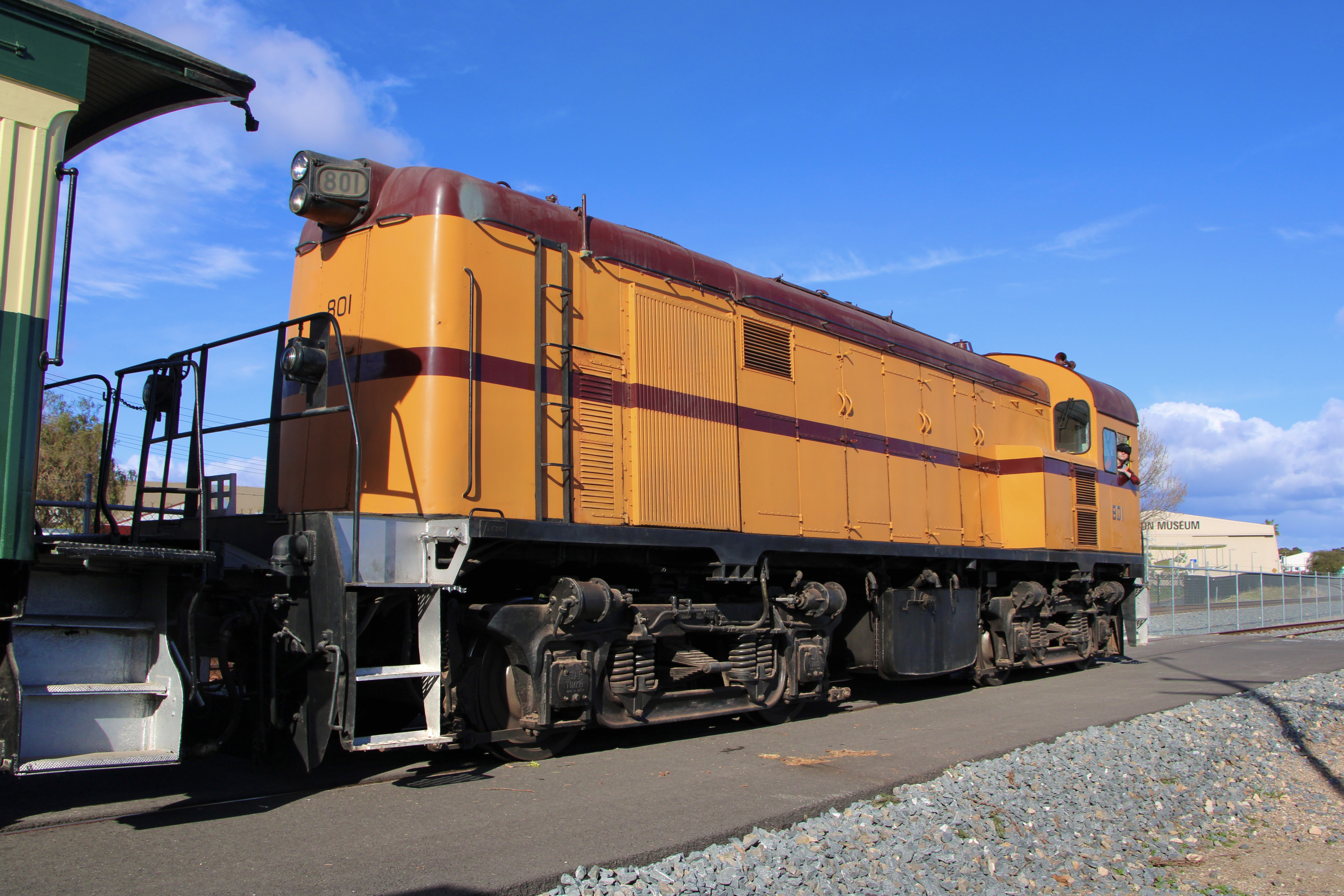
- 801 hauling passenger shuttles at the National Railway Museum, August 2025
Type and origin
- Power type: Diesel-electric
- Builder: English Electric, Rocklea
- Build date: 1956–1957
- Total produced: 10
Specifications
- Configuration
  - UIC: Bo-Bo
- Gauge: 1,600 mm (5 ft 3 in)
- Wheel diameter: 3 ft 6 in (1.067 m)
- Length: 42 ft (12.802 m) over headstocks
- Width: 9 ft 6 in (2.896 m)
- Height: 13 ft 9 in (4.191 m)
- Axle load: 18 long tons (18.3 t; 20.2 short tons)
- Loco weight: 72 long tons (73.2 t; 80.6 short tons)
- Fuel type: Diesel
- Fuel capacity: 700 imp gal (840 US gal; 3,200 L)
- Lubricant cap.: 88 imp gal (106 US gal; 400 L)
- Prime mover: English Electric 6SRKT Mk II
- RPM range: 450–850 rpm
- Engine type: four stroke, four valves per cylinder
- Aspiration: turbocharged
- Generator: EE827/4C
- Traction motors: Four EE526/3D
- Cylinders: 6 Inline
- Cylinder size: 10 in × 12 in (254 mm × 305 mm)
- MU working: 110V, stepless electro-pneumatic throttle
- Loco brake: Air
- Train brakes: Air
Performance figures
- Maximum speed: 60 miles per hour (97 km/h)
- Power output: 750 hp (560 kW) gross, 685 hp (510 kW) net
- Tractive effort
  - Starting: 38,000 lbf (169.0 kN)
  - 1 hour: 26,500 lbf (117.9 kN) at 7.6 mph (12.2 km/h)
  - Continuous: 23,000 lbf (102.3 kN) at 9.2 mph (14.8 km/h)
Career
- Operators: South Australian Railways
- Number in class: 10
- Numbers: 800–809
- First run: 30 May 1956
- Withdrawn: 1987-1992
- Preserved: 801
- Scrapped: 1988-1994
- Disposition: 1 preserved, 9 scrapped

The 800 class were a class of diesel locomotives built by English Electric, Rocklea for the South Australian Railways in 1956/57. They were nearly identical to the earlier Jamaican Railways 81 class.

== History ==
The 800 class were diesel shunter locomotives operated by the South Australian Railways. Although built for shunting duties in Adelaide, they also operated trip workings between Dry Creek and Mile End, pick up trains around Port Adelaide and passenger services. In March 1978 all were included in the transfer of the South Australian Railways to Australian National (AN).

In 1986, a new computer system required the class leaders of the former South Australian Railways to be renumbered as the last member of the class, with 800 becoming 810.

Withdrawals of the 800 class occurred from 1987 to 1991, with 806 being the first to be scrapped in 1988. 803 was damaged in a derailment at Osborne in 1990 and never returned to service. Scrapping of most of the class members continued until 1994.

801 was the last 800 in service, working its final mainline train in 1991 and continuing with shunting duties at Islington until 1992. It was sold to the National Railway Museum, Port Adelaide that year and became the sole surviving member of the 800 class. It is preserved in full operational condition and used for shunting museum exhibits, as well hauling passenger shuttles along the museum's 600m exhibition track.

In 2013, 801 was fully repainted from its faded AN livery (as it appeared when withdrawn from service) into its previous South Australian Railways livery.

SDS Models produced HO Scale models of the 800 class in 2020, producing DC and DCC variants of the class as they appeared in service with the SAR, AN, and in preservation with the NRM.

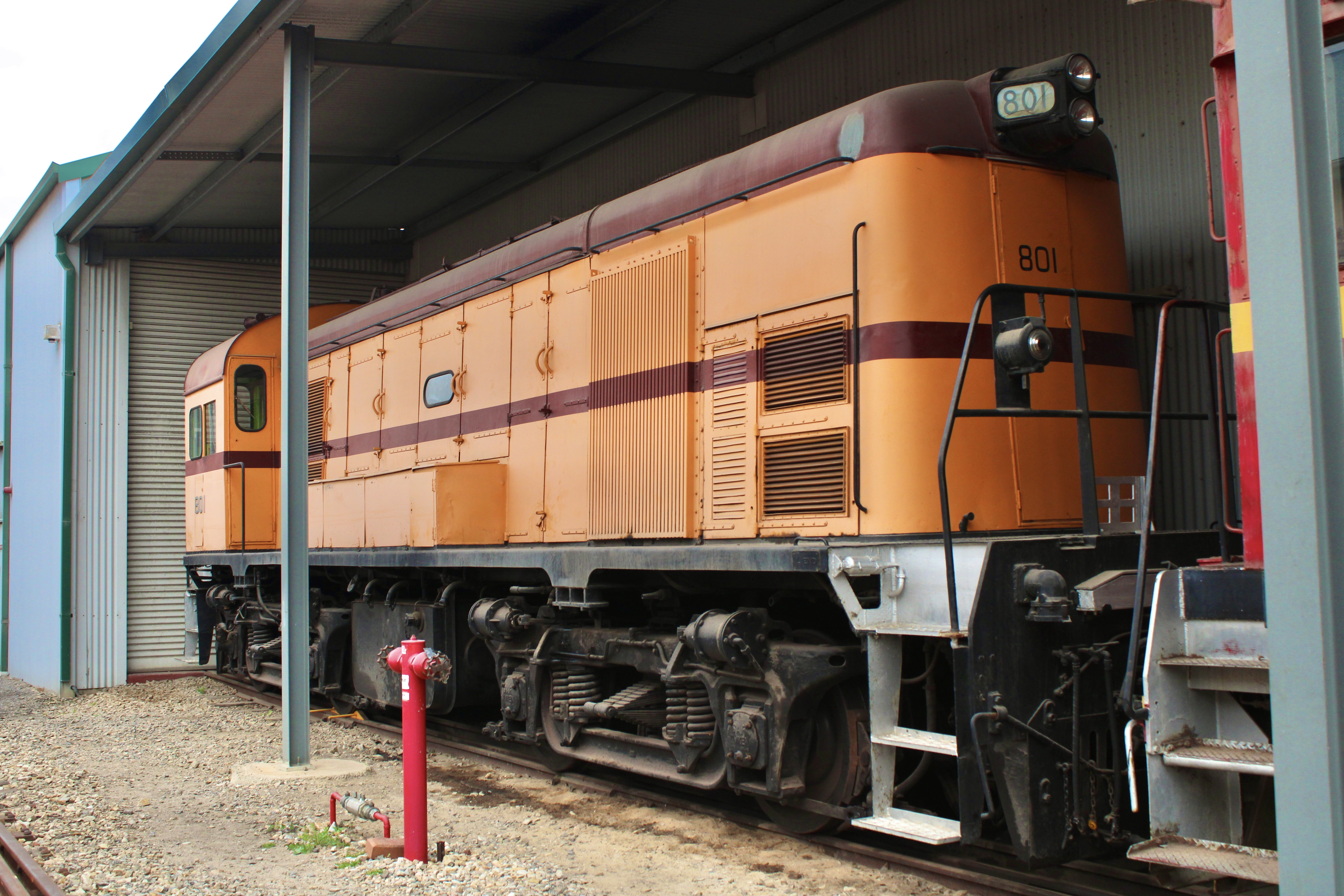
801 on display at the National Railway Museum
