= Queensland Railways 1200 class =

Class of Australian diesel-electric locomotives

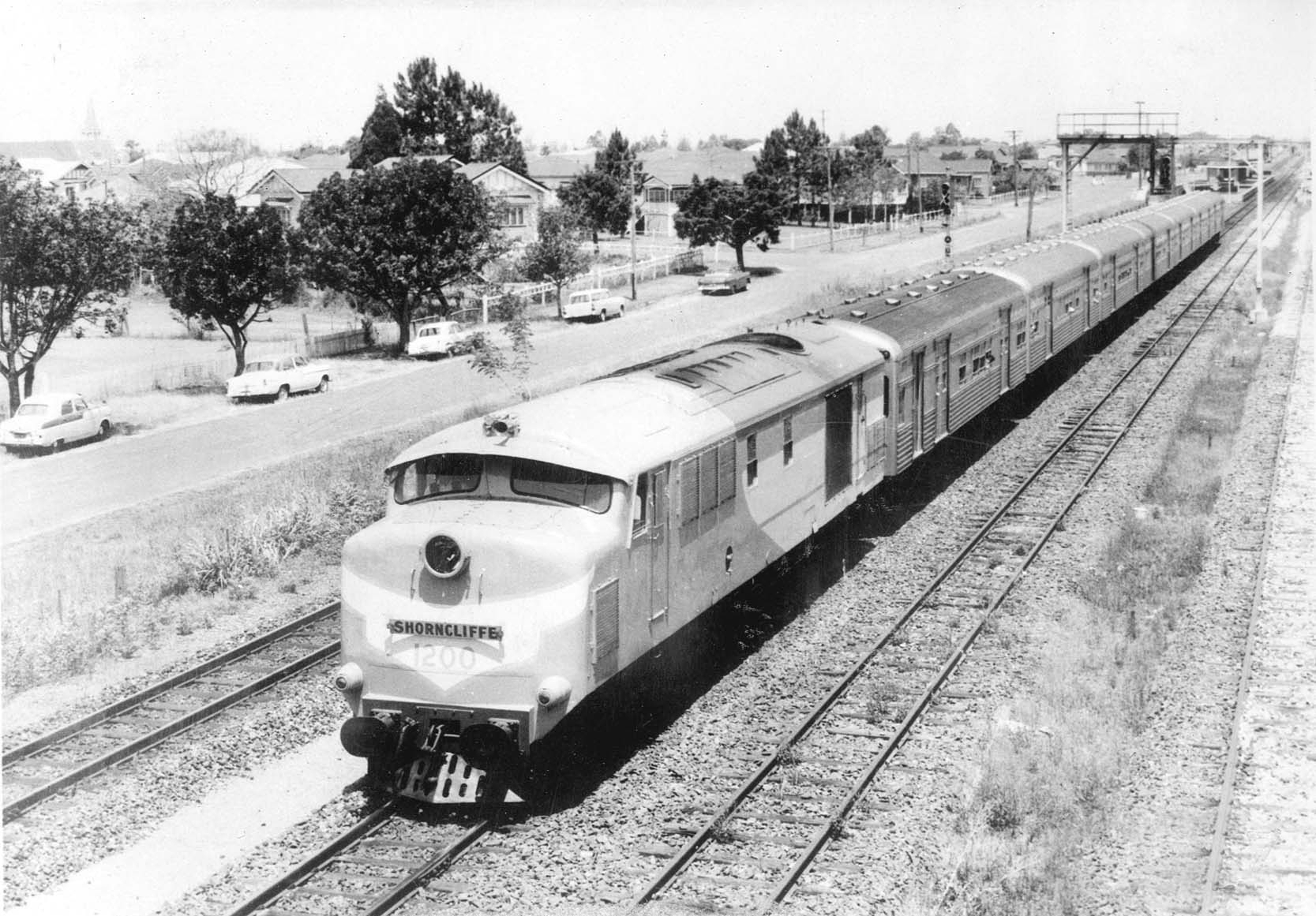
- 1200 hauling an SX carriage consist on a Shorncliffe-bound suburban service, c. 1961
Type and origin
- Power type: Diesel-electric
- Builder: English Electric, Bradford
- Build date: 1953–1954
- Total produced: 10
Specifications
- Configuration
  - Commonwealth: Co-Co
- Gauge: 1,067 mm (3 ft 6 in)
- Wheel diameter: 3 ft (0.914 m)
- Wheelbase: 45 ft (13.716 m) total, 12 ft 6 in (3.810 m) bogie
- Length: 54 ft 10 in (16.713 m) over couplers
- Width: 9 ft 3 in (2.819 m)
- Height: 12 ft 5 in (3.785 m)
- Axle load: 14.7 long tons (14.9 t; 16.5 short tons)
- Loco weight: 88 t (87 long tons; 97 short tons)
- Fuel type: Diesel
- Fuel capacity: 750 imp gal (3,400 L)
- Prime mover: English Electric 12SVT Mk II
- RPM range: 450–850rpm
- Engine type: four stroke, four valves per cylinder
- Aspiration: turbocharged
- Generator: EE828
- Traction motors: Six EE525
- Cylinders: 12 Vee
- Cylinder size: 10 in × 12 in (254 mm × 305 mm)
- Loco brake: Air
- Train brakes: Air
Performance figures
- Maximum speed: 50 miles per hour (80 km/h)
- Power output: 1,290 hp (960 kW) gross, 1,100 hp (820 kW) net
- Tractive effort: 30,000 lbf (133.4 kN) at 12 mph (20 km/h)
Career
- Operators: Queensland Railways
- Number in class: 10
- Numbers: 1200–1209
- Delivered: July 1953
- Last run: 10 February 1984
- Preserved: 1200, 1208
- Disposition: 2 preserved, 8 scrapped

The 1200 class were a class of diesel locomotive built by English Electric, Bradford for Queensland Railways in 1953–1954.

== History ==
The 1200 class were rostered to haul The Sunlander between Brisbane and Cairns, The Westlander between Brisbane and Roma and The Inlander from Townsville to Mount Isa.

A characteristic addition to the 1200s in 1961 was a sun visor to help reduce glare. As they became due for heavy overhauls in the late 1970s, they were withdrawn.

1200 has been preserved by the Australian Railway Historical Society, and is currently stored at Redbank Railway Workshops.

== 1225 class ==
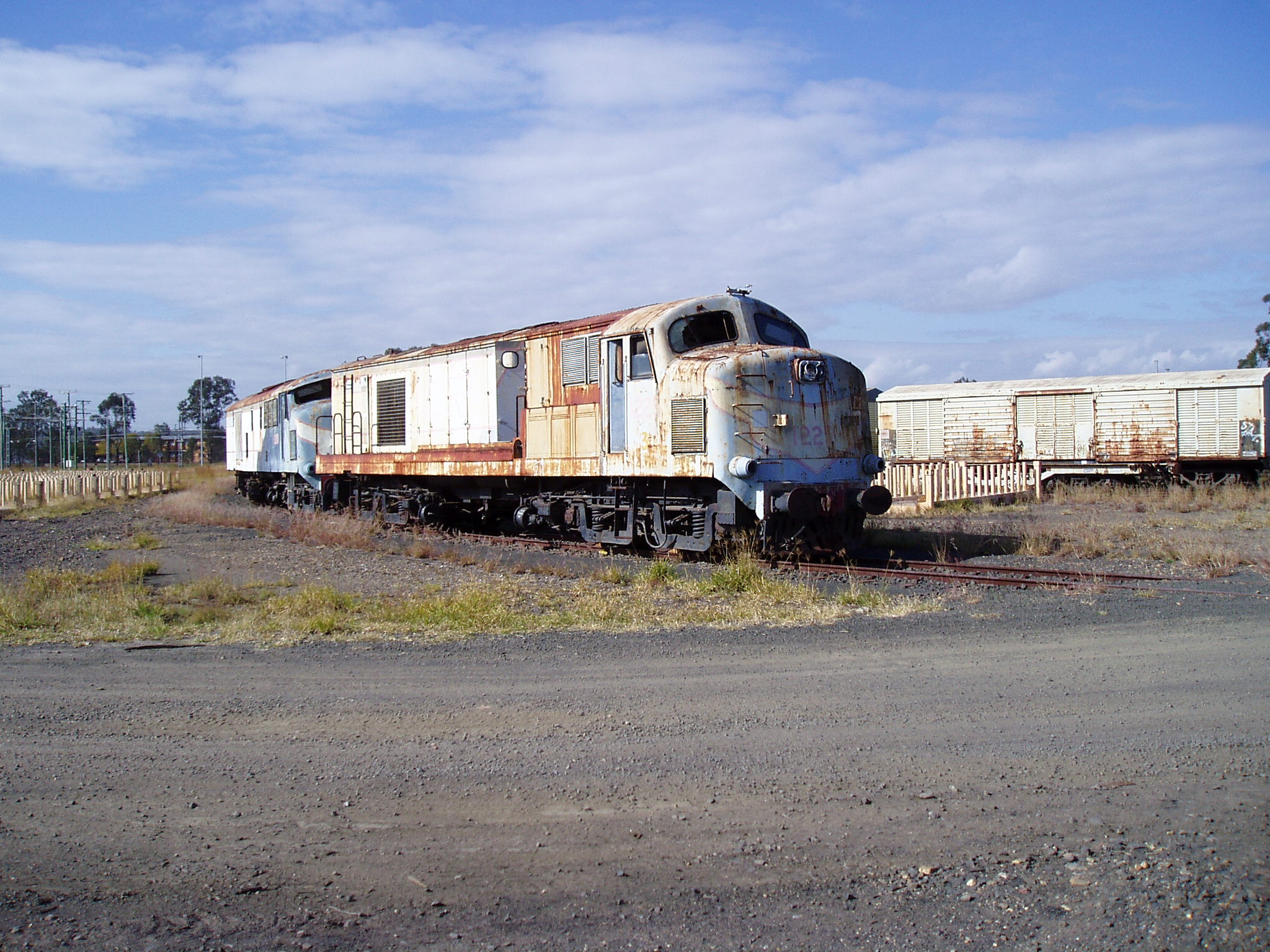
1225 at Redbank Railway Workshops in August 2005

In 1984, 1208 was rebuilt using parts from 1250 class locomotives 1252 and 1253, including a more powerful 1,145 kW (1,540 hp) engine to replace the original 962 kW (1,290 hp) EE 12SVT engine, while the body was modified to resemble a 1250 class. It earned the nickname "Hybrid" after this work and was renumbered 1225. It also resembles the Brazilian RFN Class 700. It remained in service until 1987, based at Toowoomba working mainly on the Southern line. The loco is now privately owned and is currently stored at Queensland Pioneer Steam Railway (QPSR) at Swanbank Queensland since it was moved there in mid-2010. QPSR now want it out of their premises so now its future is uncertain.

== Status table ==
Number	Serial number	In service	Withdrawn	Scrapped	Notes
1200	1905-D146	21 July 1953	3 March 1977		Preserved
1201	1906-D147	3 July 1953	5 May 1978	May 1984	
1202	1907-D148	11 December 1953	9 November 1971	January 1991	
1203	1908-D149	10 December 1953	17 January 1980	January 1991	
1204	1909-D150	3 December 1953	2 September 1981	January 1986	
1205	1910-D151	26 January 1954	19 August 1978	April 1984	
1206	1911-D152	16 February 1954	6 July 1983	August 1985	
1207	1912-D153	2 September 1954	27 July 1979	August 1985	
1208	1913-D154	8 March 1954	10 February 1984		Rebuilt as 1225
1209	1914-D155	5 April 1954	26 January 1978	March 1986	
1225		16 January 1985	16 November 1987		Preserved
