= English Electric diesel engines =

EE "K" Type

Overview
- Manufacturer: English Electric
- Production: 1934–1963

Layout
- Configuration: Straight engine in I4, I6, I7 or I8
- Displacement: 942 cu in (15.4 L) per cylinder
- Cylinder bore: 10 in (250 mm)
- Piston stroke: 12 in (300 mm)
- Valvetrain: 2 valves per cylinder head

RPM range
- Max. engine speed: 600-680rpm

Combustion
- Fuel type: Diesel
- Cooling system: Liquid cooled

Output
- Power output: 41.7 to 100 hp (31 to 75 kW) per cylinder

Chronology
- Successor: EE "RK" Type Mk I

EE "RK" Type Mk I

Overview
- Manufacturer: English Electric
- Production: 1947–1960

Layout
- Configuration: Straight engine in I4, I6 or I8
- Displacement: 942 cu in (15.4 L) per cylinder
- Cylinder bore: 10 in (250 mm)
- Piston stroke: 12 in (300 mm)
- Valvetrain: 2 valves per cylinder head

RPM range
- Max. engine speed: 600-680rpm

Combustion
- Fuel type: Diesel
- Cooling system: Liquid cooled

Output
- Power output: 41.7 to 110 hp (31 to 82 kW) per cylinder

Chronology
- Predecessor: EE "K" Type
- Successor: EE "RK" Type Mk II

EE "RK" Type Mk II

Overview
- Manufacturer: English Electric
- Production: 1951–1975

Layout
- Configuration: Straight engine in I4, I6 or I8
- Displacement: 942 cu in (15.4 L) per cylinder
- Cylinder bore: 10 in (250 mm)
- Piston stroke: 12 in (300 mm)
- Valvetrain: 4 valves per cylinder head

RPM range
- Max. engine speed: 750-850rpm

Combustion
- Fuel type: Diesel
- Cooling system: Liquid cooled

Output
- Power output: 63.3 to 213.75 hp (47 to 159 kW) per cylinder

Chronology
- Predecessor: EE "RK" Type Mk I
- Successor: EE "RK" Type Mk III

EE "RK" Type Mk III

Overview
- Manufacturer: English Electric
- Production: 1962–1976

Layout
- Configuration: Straight engine in I4, I6 or I8
- Displacement: 942 cu in (15.4 L) per cylinder
- Cylinder bore: 10 in (250 mm)
- Piston stroke: 12 in (300 mm)
- Valvetrain: 4 valves per cylinder head

RPM range
- Max. engine speed: 750-850rpm

Combustion
- Fuel type: Diesel
- Cooling system: Liquid cooled

Output
- Power output: 63.3 to 213.75 hp (47 to 159 kW) per cylinder

Chronology
- Predecessor: EE "RK" Type Mk II
- Successor: Ruston-Paxman RK3

EE "V" Type Mk I

Overview
- Manufacturer: English Electric
- Production: 1947–1966

Layout
- Configuration: V engine in V8, V12 or V16 configurations
- Displacement: 942 cu in (15.4 L) per cylinder
- Cylinder bore: 10 in (250 mm)
- Piston stroke: 12 in (300 mm)
- Valvetrain: 2 valves per cylinder head

RPM range
- Max. engine speed: 600-680rpm

Combustion
- Fuel type: Diesel
- Cooling system: Liquid cooled

Output
- Power output: 41.7 to 110 hp (31 to 82 kW) per cylinder

Chronology
- Successor: EE "V" Type Mk II

EE "V" Type Mk II
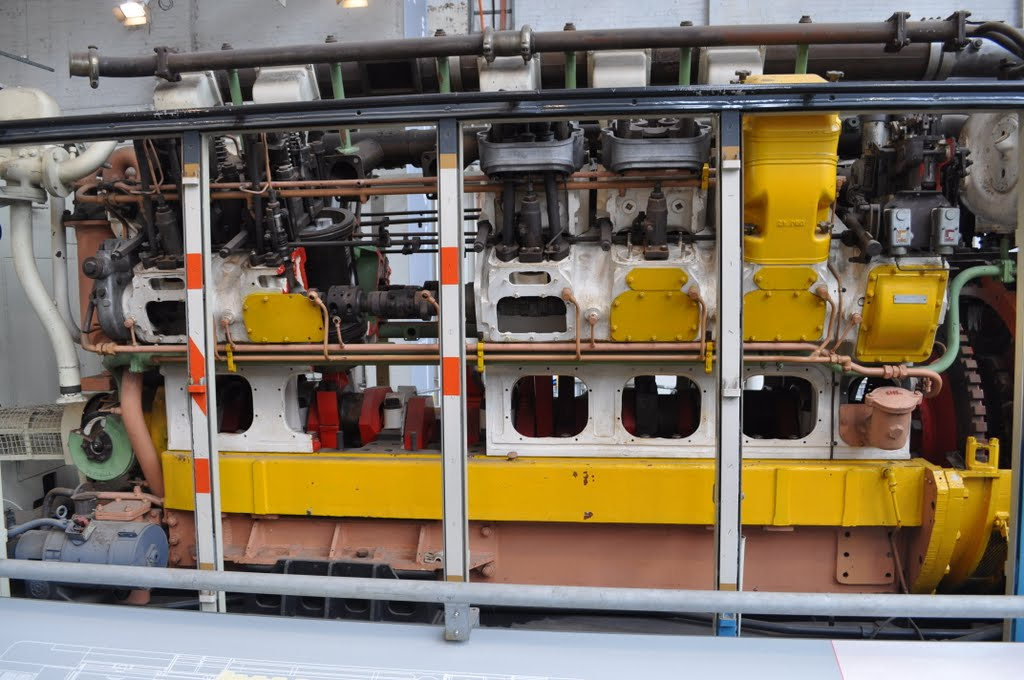
- Cutaway 12SVT in a Queensland Railways 1250 class at the Workshops Rail Museum, North Ipswich

Overview
- Manufacturer: English Electric
- Production: 1951–1972

Layout
- Configuration: V engine in V8, V12 or V16 configurations
- Displacement: 942 cu in (15.4 L) per cylinder
- Cylinder bore: 10 in (250 mm)
- Piston stroke: 12 in (300 mm)
- Valvetrain: 4 valves per cylinder head

RPM range
- Max. engine speed: 750-850rpm

Combustion
- Fuel type: Diesel
- Cooling system: Liquid cooled

Output
- Power output: 63.3 to 213.75 hp (47 to 159 kW) per cylinder

Chronology
- Predecessor: EE "V" Type Mk I
- Successor: EE "V" Type Mk III

EE "V" Type Mk III

Overview
- Manufacturer: English Electric
- Production: 1962–1976

Layout
- Configuration: V engine in V8, V12 or V16 configurations
- Displacement: 942 cu in (15.4 L) per cylinder
- Cylinder bore: 10 in (250 mm)
- Piston stroke: 12 in (300 mm)
- Valvetrain: 4 valves per cylinder head

RPM range
- Max. engine speed: 750-850rpm

Combustion
- Fuel type: Diesel
- Cooling system: Liquid cooled

Output
- Power output: 63.3 to 213.75 hp (47 to 159 kW) per cylinder

Chronology
- Predecessor: EE "V" Type Mk II
- Successor: Ruston-Paxman RK3

English Electric's K, RK and V type diesel engines were manufactured by the English Electric company of the United Kingdom for stationary, rail transport and maritime use between 1934 and 1976.

== History ==
Initially, the "K" type engine developed in the 1930s were offered in I4, I6, I7 and I8 variants, had 2-valve cylinder heads and ran at 600-680rpm. In 1940, turbocharging became an option, boosting power output by about 61%.

Due to the demand of more power, the Mark I "RK" (Revised K) and "V" type were introduced in 1947. The "V" type were built in V8, V12 and V16 configurations.

In 1951, the engines received 4-valve cylinder heads, thus creating Mark II "RK" and "V" types which ran at 750-850rpm. Intercooling became an option in 1960, adding a "C" to the engine designation should it be equipped. More revisions saw the creation of the Mark III engines in 1962.

Unlike other comparable engines (and unusually for its size), EE used timing chains instead of timing gears. This was changed in 1968 with the introduction of the RK3 series by Ruston-Paxman after the demise of EE in the same year.

=== Nomenclature ===
- 4, 6, 7, 8, 12, 16 - Cylinder count
- C - Intercooler
- S - Supercharged (actually turbocharged)
- K, RK, V - Engine type
- M, T - Intended purpose
  - M - Maritime
  - T - Rail Traction

== Variants ==
Type	Cylinders	Aspiration	Applications
4RKM	4	Naturally Aspirated	Port Phillip Bay pilot ship DE (or MV or TS) Wyuna (originally had three but third engine was removed in 1980s and is with the Australian Maritime College)
4SRKT Mk II	4	Turbocharger	BR Class 73, 201, 202, 205 & 207, UTA 70 Class, NIR 80 Class, NIR 450 Class, SAR 500 Class
6KT	6	Naturally Aspirated	BR Class 08, 09, 11, 12, 13 & D3/11, VR F class, KTM Class 15, Litt V1 Nr 3 & 4 & NS Class 600, AIS D9 Class
6RKT Mk I	6	Naturally Aspirated	SAR 350 Class
6SRKT Mk I	6	Turbocharger	NZR DE Class, TGR X Class
6SRKT Mk II	6	Turbocharger	MRWA F Class, NZR DG & DH Classes (1955), Nigerian Railways 1001 class, SAR 800 Class, Tasmanian Government Railways Y class
6CSRKT	6	Turbocharger & Intercooler	GML1-2, NZR DI Class, QR 1600 & 1620 Classes, WAGR H Class, AIS D35 Class
6CSRKM	6	Turbocharger & Intercooler	NZR rail ferries Aramoana, Aranui, Aratika, Arahunga
7SKM	7	Turbocharger	MV North Head, MV Baragoola & MV Bellubera
8RKM	8	Naturally Aspirated	Port Phillip Bay pilot ship DE (or MV or TS) Wyuna (3x)
8SRKT	8	Turbocharger	AIS D1 Class, AIS D16 Class
8SVT Mk II	8	Turbocharger	British Rail Class 20, MRWA G Class
8CSV Mk II	8	Turbocharger & Intercooler	Hinkley Point A Nuclear Power Station emergency diesel generators
8CSVT	8	Turbocharger & Intercooler	CP Class 1400, KTM Class 22, NIR 101 Class
12SVT Mk II	12	Turbocharger	BR Class 31, KTM Class 20, NZR DF Class (1954), QR 1200, 1225, 1250 & 1270 classes
12CSVT	12	Turbocharger & Intercooler	BR Class 37, AIS D34 Class, East African Railways 90 Class, Ghana Railways 1851 class, GML3-9, QR 1300, 2350 & 2370 classes, Sudan Government Railways 1000 Class, TGR Z & Za classes, WAGR C, K & R/RA Classes, Rhodesia Railways Class DE3
16SVT Mk I	16	Turbocharger	BR Class D16/1 (equipped with Brown Boveri turbochargers) & D16/2 (equipped with Napier & Son turbochargers), SAR 900 Class
16SVT Mk II	16	Turbocharger	BR Class 40, Rhodesia Railways Class DE2
16CSVT	16	Turbocharger & Intercooler	BR DP2 & Class 50, CP Class 1800
16CSVM	16	Turbocharger & Intercooler	Royal Australian Navy Oberon-class submarine, NZR rail ferries Aramoana and Aranui
