= Nigerian Railways 1001 class =

Class of diesel-electric locomotive

Type and origin
- Power type: Diesel-electric
- Builder: English Electric, Preston; Vulcan Foundry
- Build date: 1955
- Total produced: 24; 10 Nigerian Railways; 14 Gold Coast Railways
Specifications
- Configuration
  - Commonwealth: Bo-Bo
- Gauge: 1,067 mm (3 ft 6 in)
- Wheel diameter: 3 ft 0 1/2 in (0.927 m)
- Wheelbase: 24 ft 6 in (7.47 m)
  - Bogie: 8 ft (2.4 m) bogie
- Length: 35 ft (11 m) over headstocks
- Width: 9 ft (2.7 m)
- Height: 11 ft 10 in (3.61 m)
- Axle load: 13.6 long tons (13.8 t; 15.2 short tons)
- Loco weight: 53.15 long tons (54.00 t; 59.53 short tons)
- Fuel type: Diesel
- Fuel capacity: 400 imp gal (1,800 L)
- Prime mover: English Electric 6SRKT Mk II
- RPM range: 450-850 rpm
- Engine type: four stroke, four valves per cylinder
- Aspiration: turbocharged
- Traction motors: Four
- Cylinders: 6 Inline
- Cylinder size: 10 in × 12 in (254 mm × 305 mm)
- Loco brake: Vacuum
- Train brakes: Vacuum
Performance figures
- Maximum speed: 55 miles per hour (89 km/h)
- Power output: 750 hp (560 kW) gross, 676 hp (500 kW) net
- Tractive effort
  - Starting: 30,000 lbf (133.4 kN)
  - 1 hour: 19,900 lbf (88.5 kN) at 9.6 mph (20 km/h)
  - Continuous: 17,500 lbf (77.8 kN) at 11.2 mph (20 km/h)
Career
- Operators: Nigerian Railways; Gold Coast Railways
- Number in class: 10; (14 Gold Coast Railways)
- Numbers: 1001-1010
- First run: 1955
- Disposition: 10 scrapped

The 1001 class were a class of ten diesel-electric locomotive built by English Electric and Vulcan Foundry in 1955 for Nigerian Railways. The locomotives were similar to fourteen locomotives supplied to the Gold Coast Railways (later Ghana Railways) in 1955, as their first diesel-electric locomotives, and a further twelve similar locomotives were ordered by the Ghana Railway and Harbour Administration in 1958. The construction and layout of the locomotives was very similar to the earlier NZR DE class.

== Description ==
The 1001 class were hood unit locomotives with a single cab and access platforms at each end. The cab had two driving positions so the locomotives could be driven in either direction. They were powered by an English Electric 6SRKT Mark II engine rated at 750 bhp. The main generator was directly mounted to the engine and the complete unit mounted to the underframe on three resilient mounts. The engine was run at one of three set speeds (450, 620 and 850 rpm) as required by the duty being performed. In the highest engine speed setting field weakening was used to increase output power.

The main generator was a single bearing machine and supplied current to the traction motors and the radiator fan motor. The output of the generator was dependent on its field strength and on the speed of the diesel engine, both of which were controlled by the driver through the controller. The four traction motors were of the axle-hung, nose-suspended type driving the axles through single-reduction spur gears. Electrically they were connected in pairs in permanent series, with the two pairs in parallel. An auxiliary generator provided low voltage power for the control gear circuits, battery charging, lighting and all auxiliary machines.

The underframe was constructed from welded steel, with the main members being of box construction to form the fuel tanks. A steel plate was welded in to the bottom of the underframe to prevent any fuel or any oil spillage reaching the traction motors. The body had a single driving cab at one end, and a long hood housing the engine-generator group and the auxiliary control equipment. The cab was entered from the end platform through a centre door, but had an additional emergency door in the hood side. There was a double roof to give some insulation from the sun’s heat. Nigerian locomotives had cow catchers and ABC couplers, Ghanaian locomotives had Visco No 2 Alliance couplers.

The hood comprised a compartment housing the water and oil cooling radiators and the fan; a motor blower group for the traction motors along with its own air filters; and a motor driven air compressor with suction strainer, and an air reservoir. Air for the electro-pneumatic control gear, sanding, window wipers and emergency refuelling of the locomotives, was supplied from this system. The second compartment in the main casing contained the main engine and generator with the main air intake-air filters and the lubricating oil filters. The third compartment, back against the driving cab, houses the auxiliary generator, control gear cubicles, resistances and air filters. Access to all three compartments was by hinged doors on both sides, but the roof over the central compartment was removable and also contained sliding hatches above the cylinder heads and turbo-blowers. A 72-cell alkaline battery provided current for engine starting and other purposes, and was housed in a box outside the main casing on the left-hand side.

The locomotive and train braking both used vacuum brakes, using two motor-driven exhausters. Two 24" vacuum cylinders were fitted, one on the inner headstock of each bogie. The locomotive brakes had clasp-type brake shoes on every wheel. Brake equipment, an E10 compressor, and compressed air fittings for controls, fuelling and sanding, were supplied by the Westinghouse Brake & Signal Co. Ltd. Pneumatic sanding was provided for each direction of travel. The sand boxes were fabricated integrally with the underframe.

One-piece steel castings were used for the bogie frames and the centre pivot was also was a steel casting with a phosphor bronze lining on the bearing surface. The axle boxes were cast steel with roller bearings and manganese steel liners. For suspension there were laminated springs above the axle boxes and auxiliary coil springs.

== Operations ==
The locomotives were intended to be used singly for shunting and light passenger or goods trains, and in multiple for heavier main line services.

New workshops were built in Zaria in 1956 to maintain the locomotives. When the final locomotive entered service in January 1956 the class operated services on the Zaria–Kano and Zaria–Kaura Namoda lines. The locomotives were two heavy to operate on the Kano–Nguru line.
