= Queensland Railways 1600 class =

Australian diesel-electric locomotives

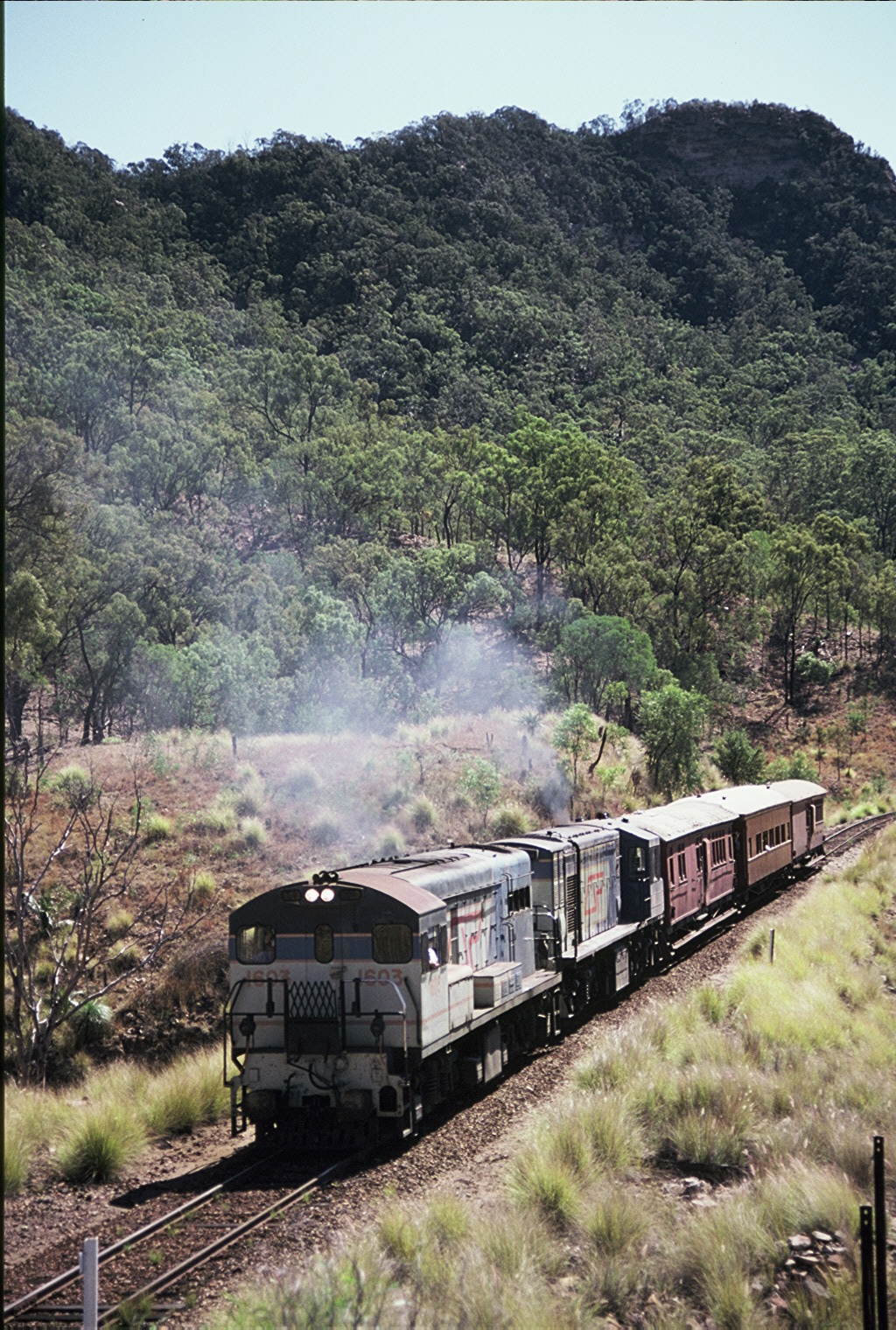
- 1603 & 1634 climb the Razorback Range on the 'Last Train to Mount Morgan' tour in August 1987
Type and origin
- Power type: Diesel-electric
- Builder: English Electric, Rocklea
- Serial number: A.059 to A.067; A.070 to A.080
- Model: RSE92C
- Build date: 1962-1964
- Total produced: 18
Specifications
- Configuration
  - UIC: Co-Co
- Gauge: 1,067 mm (3 ft 6 in)
- Bogies: Commonwealth
- Wheel diameter: 3 ft 1 1/2 in (0.953 m)
- Minimum curve: 250 ft (76.200 m)
- Wheelbase: 32 ft (9.754 m) total, 11 ft 6 in (3.505 m) bogie
- Length: 40 ft 9 in (12.421 m) over headstocks
- Width: 9 ft 0 1/2 in (2.756 m)
- Height: 12 ft 7 1/2 in (3.848 m)
- Axle load: 10 1/4 long tons (10.4 t; 11.5 short tons)
- Loco weight: 61 1/2 long tons (62.5 t; 68.9 short tons)
- Fuel type: Diesel
- Fuel capacity: 600 imp gal (2,700 L)
- Lubricant cap.: 60 imp gal (270 L)
- Water cap.: 100 imp gal (450 L)
- Prime mover: English Electric 6CSRKT Mk II
- RPM range: 850rpm max
- Engine type: four stroke, four valves per cylinder
- Aspiration: turbocharged, intercooled
- Generator: EE827
- Traction motors: Six EE540
- Cylinders: 6 Inline
- Cylinder size: 10 in × 12 in (254 mm × 305 mm)
- MU working: 110 V, stepless electro-pneumatic throttle. Common working with all other QR English Electric's
- Loco brake: straight air
- Train brakes: air
Performance figures
- Maximum speed: 50 miles per hour (80 km/h)
- Power output: 925 hp (690 kW) gross, 838 hp (620 kW) net
- Tractive effort: 30,000 lbf (133.4 kN) at 7.8 mph (10 km/h)
Career
- Operators: Queensland Railways
- Number in class: 18
- Numbers: 1600-1617
- First run: January 1963
- Last run: April 1991
- Withdrawn: 1991
- Preserved: 1603, 1604, 1613, 1614, 1616
- Disposition: 2 preserved for display, 13 scrapped, 3 operational (1604,1614, 1616)

The 1600 class was a class of diesel locomotives built by English Electric, Rocklea for Queensland Railways between 1962 and 1964.

== History ==
The 1600 class were built as branch line locomotives. Two contracts were let of which the first was for twelve with a follow on contract for another six. The first batch were delivered between December 1962 and June 1963, with the others arriving between October 1963 and January 1964. A lengthy delay occurred before delivery owing to the first four being over the design weight. This resulted in numbers 1604 and 1605 being the first to enter service. All others were delivered after the weight problem had been overcome.

They were initially based at Alpha in Central West Queensland and at Roma in South west Queensland. They were also used for shunting at yards around the state. Soon afterwards, all the 1600s were based at Alpha. The 1620 Class followed on from the success of the 1600s, and were used in the central and northern areas of Qld.

The class was withdrawn in 1991.

Five have been preserved:

- 1603 by the Bundaberg Railway Historical Society
- 1604 by the Bellarine Railway, Queenscliff, Victoria
- 1613 by the Longreach Powerhouse Museum
- 1614 by the Australian Railway Historical Society at the Archer Park Rail Museum, Rockhampton
- 1616 by the Queensland Pioneer Steam Railway, Ipswich

== Status table of preserved locomotives ==
Number	In service	Withdrawn	Owner	Location	Notes
1603	02/1963	1991	Bundaberg Railway Historical Society	Bundaberg Railway Museum	Static display. Relocated from CQ University (Bundaberg Campus) in July 2023.
1604	12/1962	1991	Bellarine Railway	Queenscliff, Victoria	Operational. Previously preserved by ARHS-Qld Division at Rosewood Railway Museum.
1613	11/1963	1991	Longreach Powerhouse Museum	Longreach	On static display.
1614	11/1963	1991	ARHS-Qld Division	Archer Park Museum, Rockhampton	Operational. On loan from ARHS-Qld Division.
1616	12/1963	1991	Queensland Pioneer Steam Railway	Box Flat (Swanbank)	Operational. Used to supplement their flagship PB15.

== Gallery ==
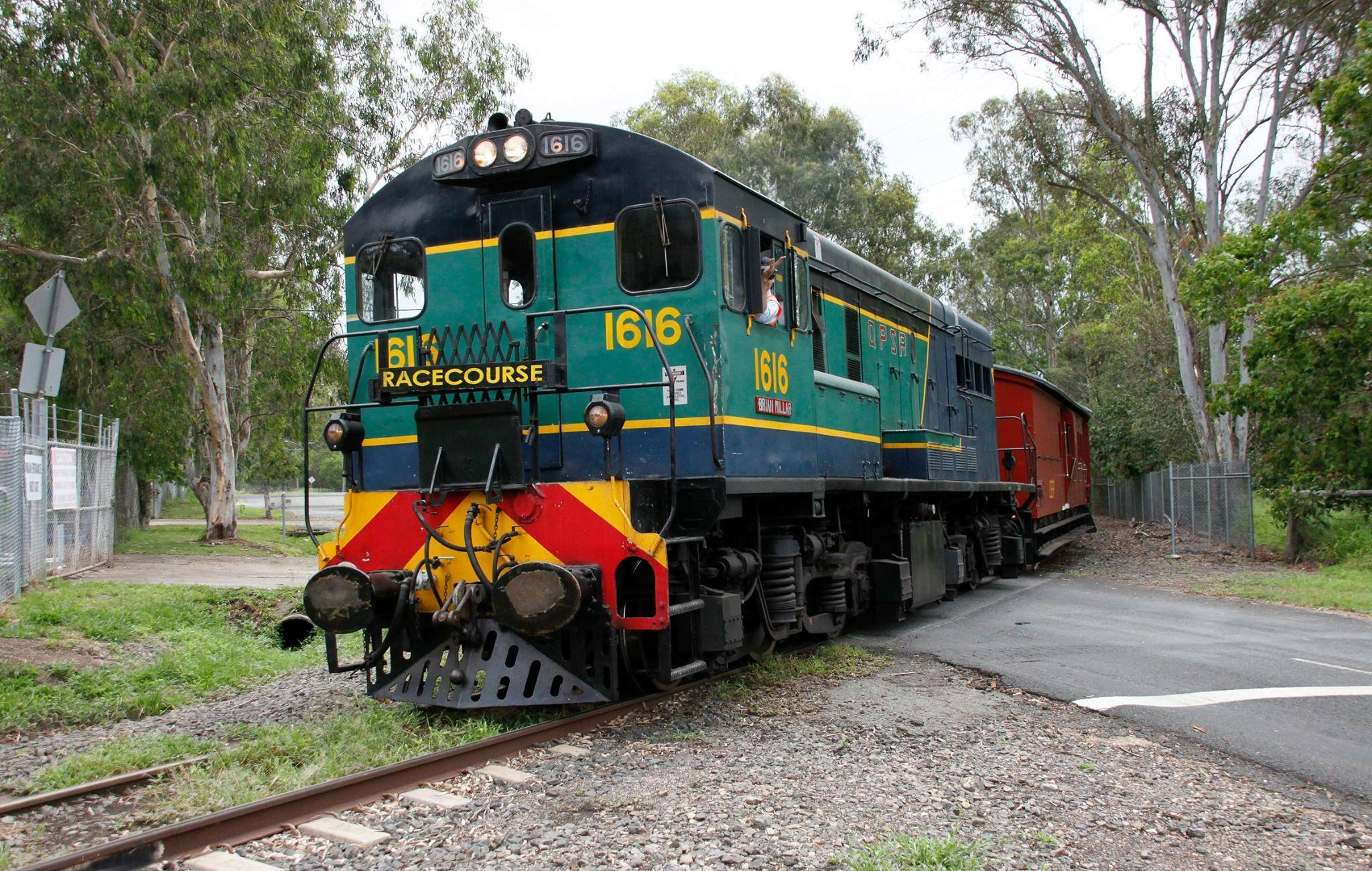
Preserved 1616 at the Queensland Pioneer Steam Railway, Ipswich in 2015

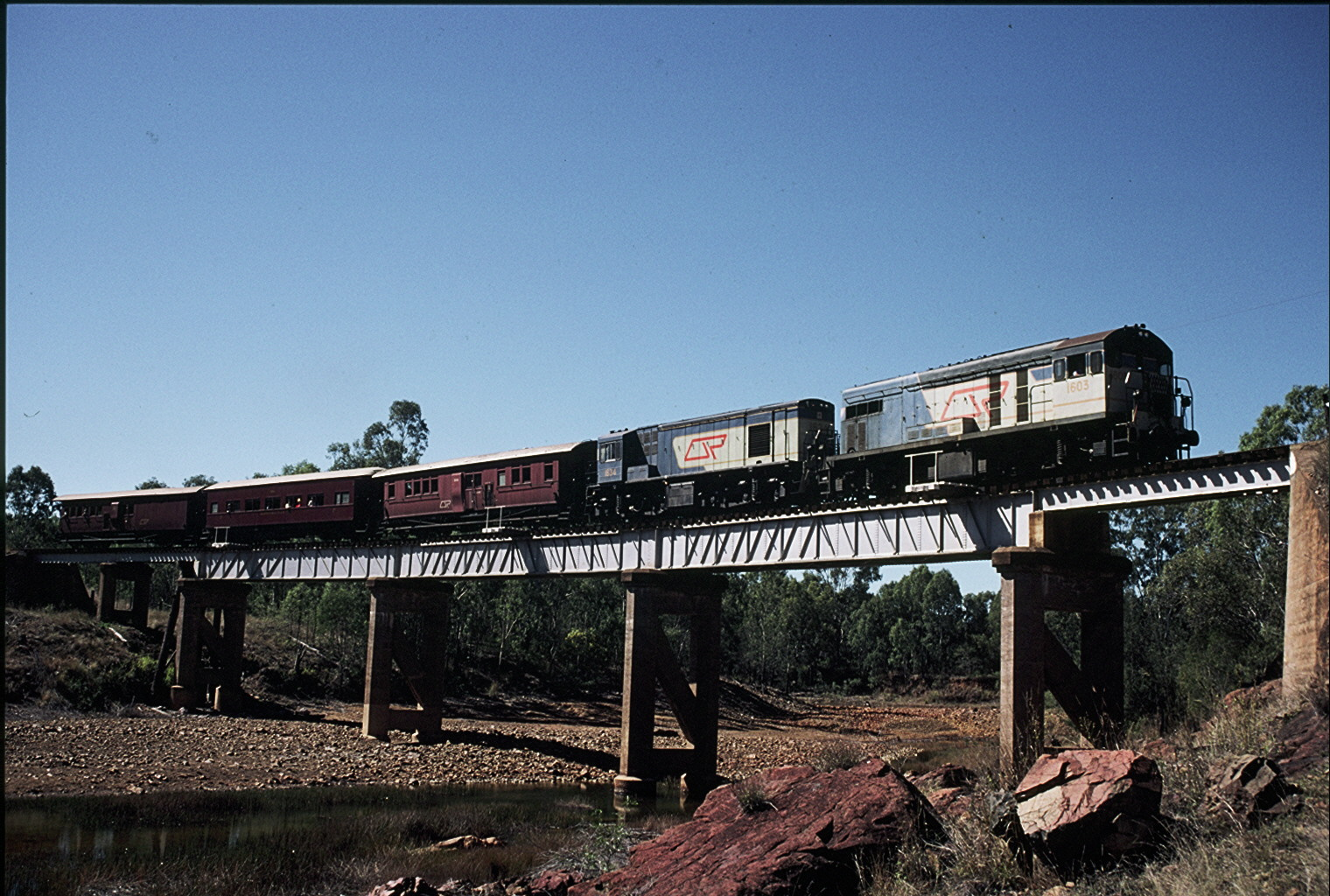
1603 & 1634 south of Mount Morgan in August 1987

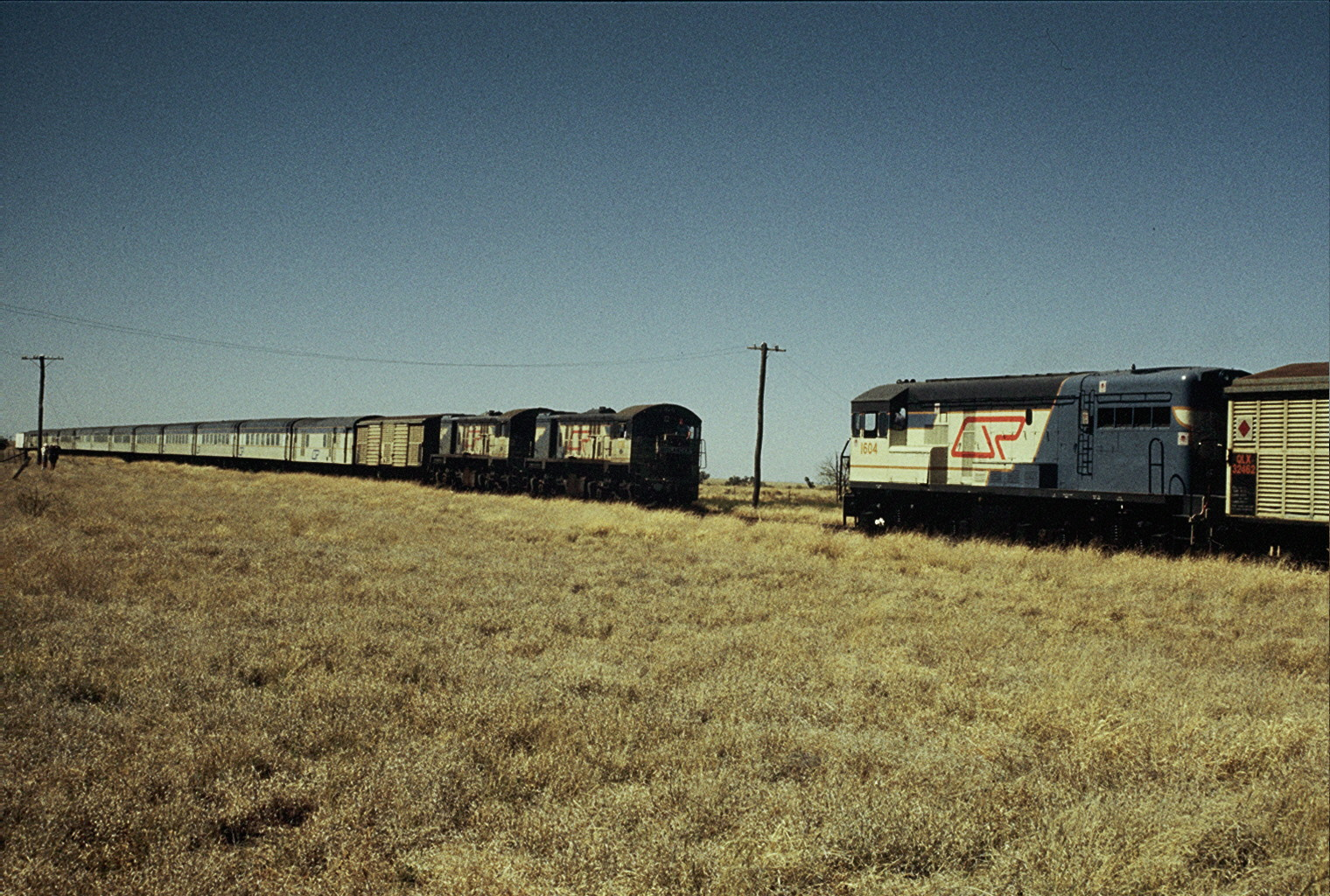
1604 crossing the westbound Midlander in September 1989

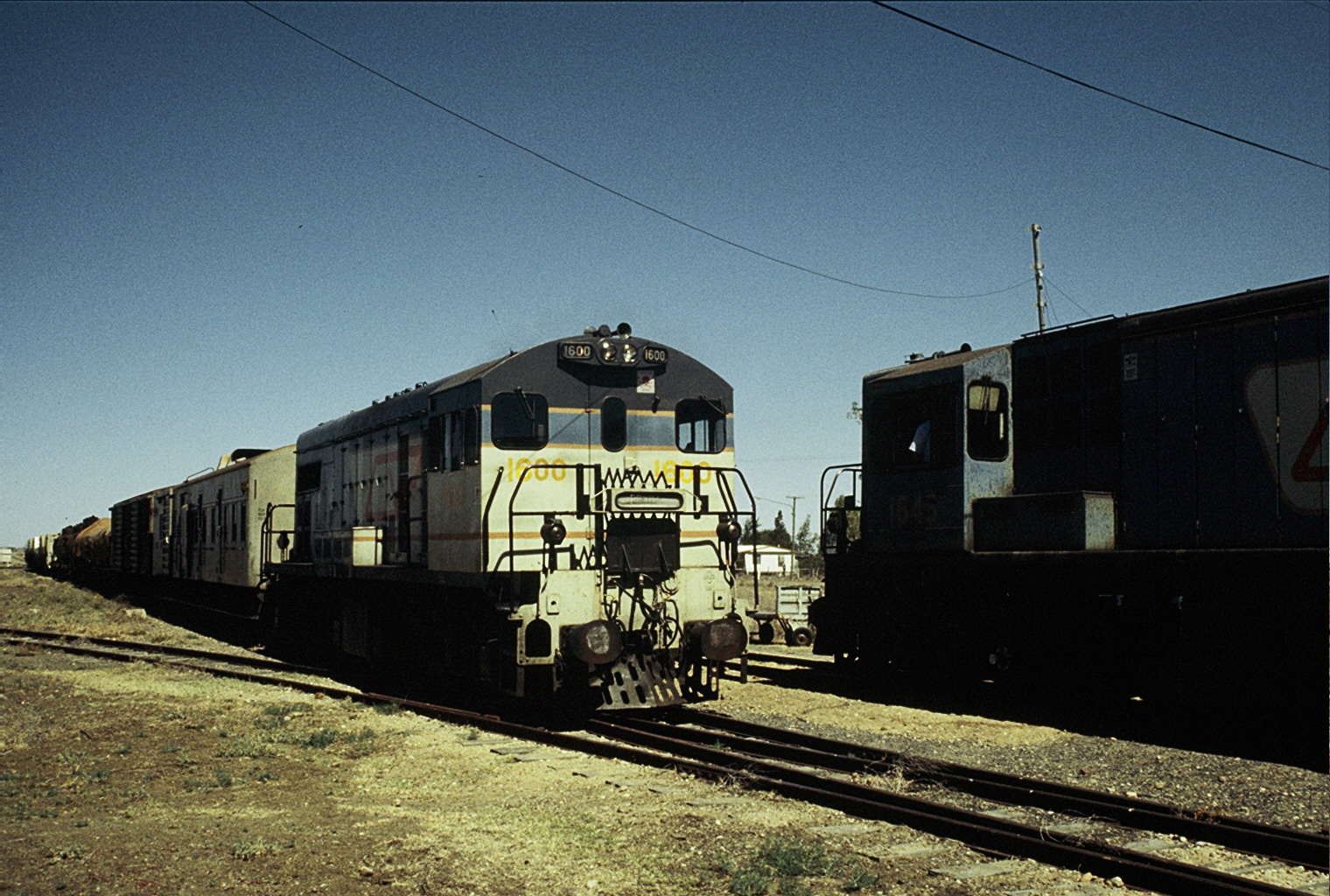
1600 & 1645 cross in September 1989

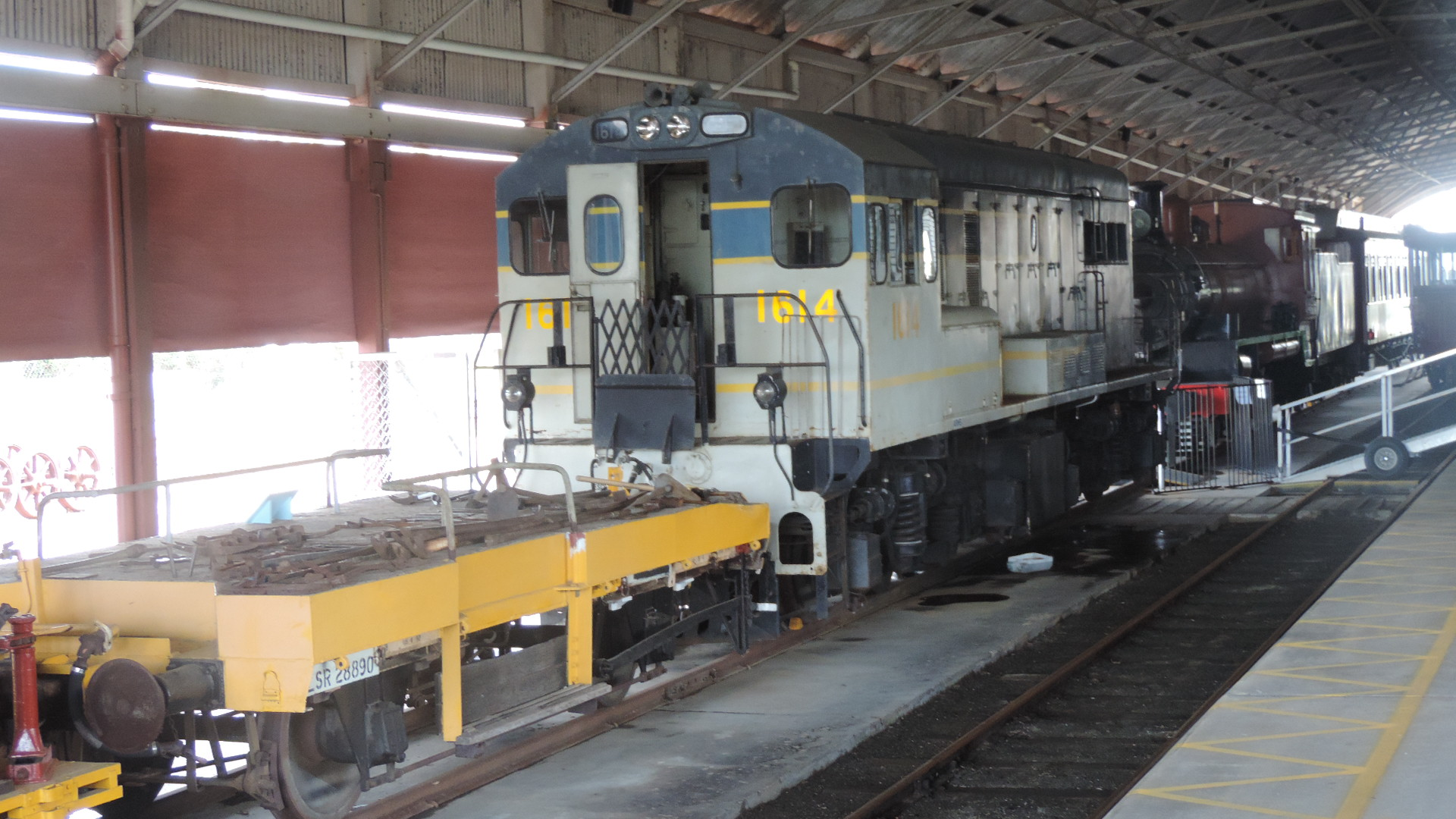
1614 at Archer Park Rail Museum, 2016

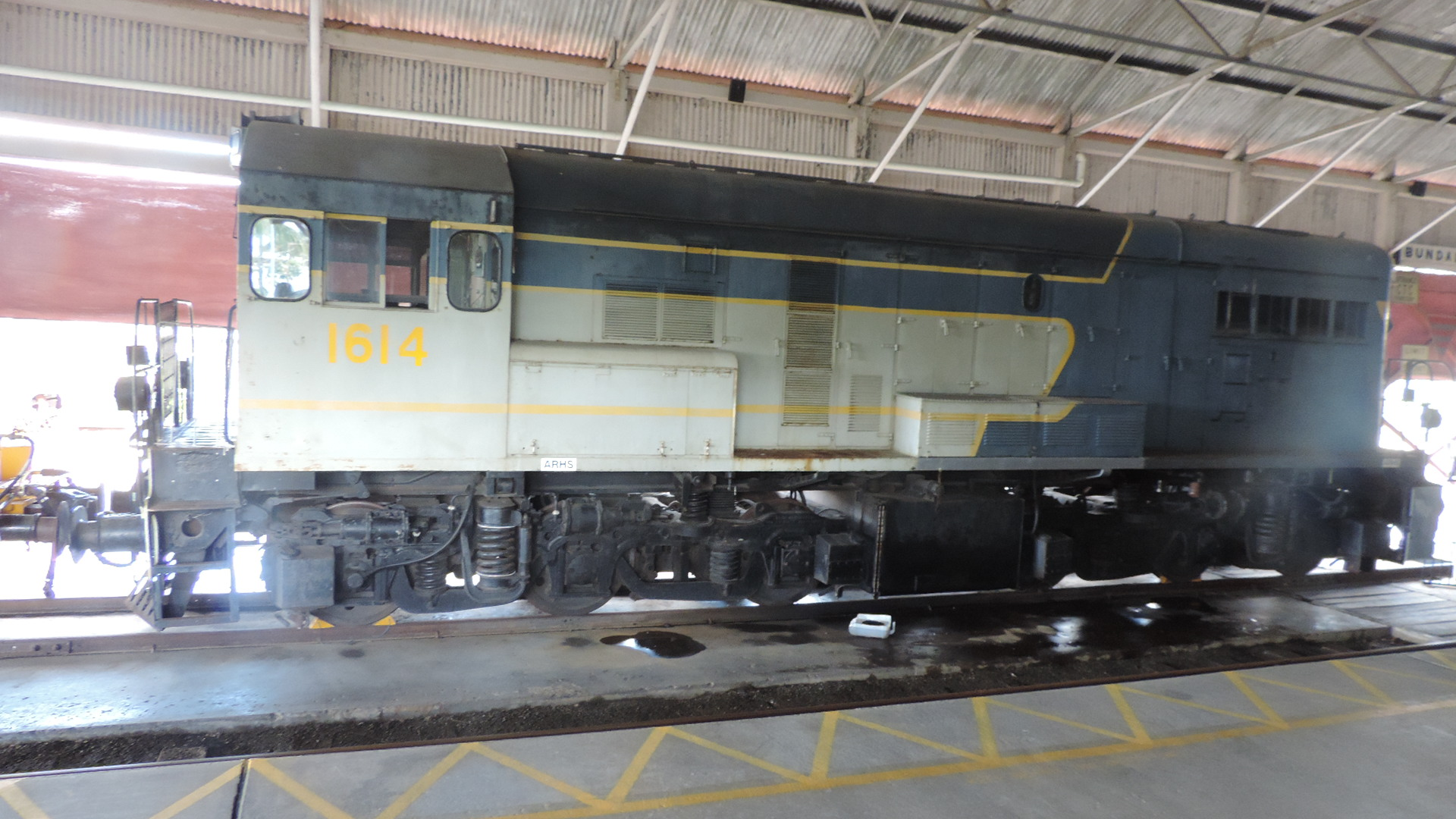
1614 at Archer Park Rail Museum, 2016
