= New Takoradi =

Coordinates: 4°54′N 1°45′W

- Interactive map of New Takoradi
- Country: Ghana
- Region: Western Region (Ghana)

New Takoradi is a town in the Western region of Ghana. It is 3 kilometres from the centre Takoradi the Western regional capital. The serves both as a dormitory town as well as an industrialized zone.

== Boundaries ==
The town is bordered on all sides by Takoradi, except for the south, where it shares a boundary with the Atlantic Ocean.

== Notable places ==
- Ghana Cement Company
- Ghana Manganese Company
- Ghana Bauxite Company
