= Queensland Railways 1250 class =

Australian diesel-electric locomotives

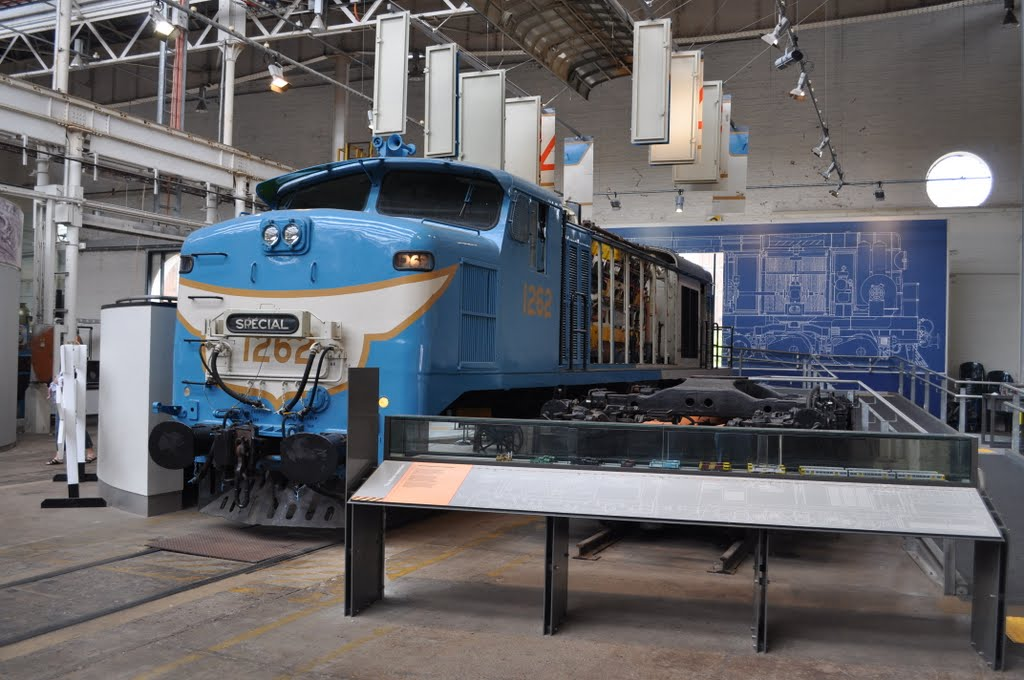
- Cutaway 1262 at the Workshops Rail Museum, North Ipswich in October 2011
Type and origin
- Power type: Diesel-electric
- Builder: English Electric, Rocklea
- Build date: 1959–1963
- Total produced: 17
Specifications
- Configuration
  - Commonwealth: Co-Co
- Gauge: 1,067 mm (3 ft 6 in)
- Wheel diameter: 3 ft 1 1/2 in (0.953 m)
- Wheelbase: 40 ft 6 in (12.344 m) total, 12 ft 6 in (3.810 m) bogie
- Length: 49 ft 6 in (15.088 m) over headstocks
- Width: 9 ft 2 in (2.794 m)
- Axle load: 15 long tons (15.2 t; 16.8 short tons)
- Loco weight: 90 long tons (91.4 t; 100.8 short tons)
- Fuel type: Diesel
- Fuel capacity: 750 imp gal (3,400 L)
- Prime mover: English Electric 12SVT mark 2
- RPM range: 400–850 rpm
- Engine type: four stroke, four valves per cylinder
- Aspiration: turbocharged
- Generator: English Electric English Electric 822
- Traction motors: English Electric English Electric 525
- Cylinders: 12 vee
- Cylinder size: 10 in × 12 in (254 mm × 305 mm)
- Transmission: electric
- MU working: 110V, stepless electro-pneumatic throttle (1255-1266 only fitted)
- Loco brake: Air
- Train brakes: Air
Performance figures
- Maximum speed: 50 miles per hour (80 km/h)
- Power output: 1,395 hp (1,040 kW) gross, 1,240 hp (920 kW) net (1250-1254); 1,540 hp (1,150 kW) gross, 1,390 hp (1,040 kW) net (1255-1266)
- Tractive effort: 40,200 lbf (178.8 kN) at 9.4 mph (20 km/h)(1250-1254); 46,500 lbf (206.8 kN) at 9.4 mph (20 km/h) (1255-1266)
Career
- Operators: Queensland Railways
- Number in class: 17
- Numbers: 1250-1266
- First run: 23 July 1959
- Last run: 24 November 1987
- Preserved: 1262, 1263
- Disposition: 2 preserved, 15 scrapped

The 1250 class were a class of diesel locomotive built by English Electric, Rocklea for Queensland Railways between 1959 and 1963.

== History ==
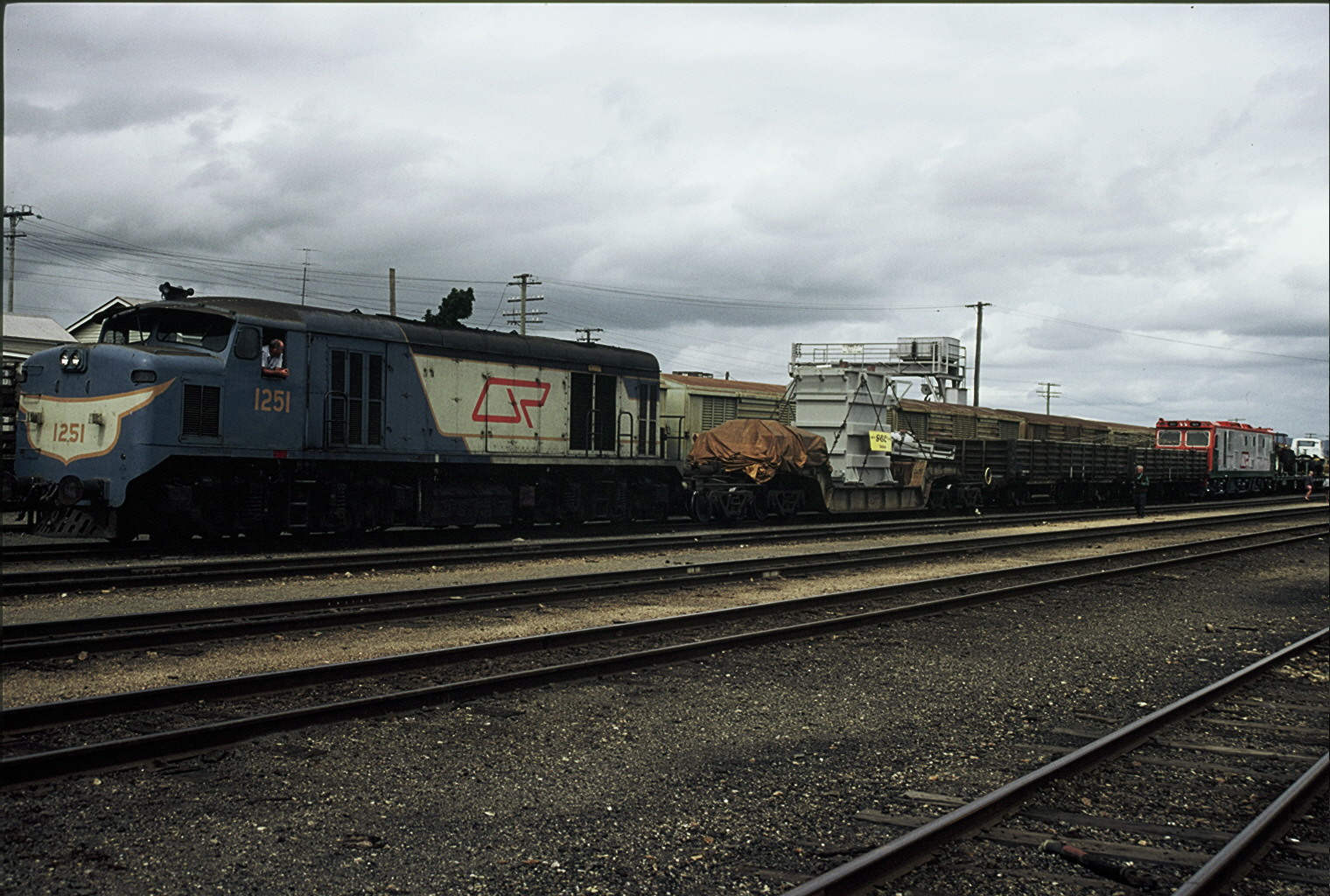
1251 in Gympie yard hauling a northbound freight train including a new 3100 class locomotive being delivered to Gladstone in 1987

The design of the 1250 class was unusual being a cab unit with a cab similar to the 1200 class but with a narrow long hood. They were based on a design built for use in Brazil five years prior. A derivative was also built for Rhodesia Railways in 1962.

The first five units had a 1,035 kW (1,390 hp) engine and screw couplers.

The subsequent units fitted with a 1,145 kW (1,540 hp) engine, auto couplers and were wired for multiple unit operation.

They were used on ore traffic on the Great Northern line, and on general freight on the North Coast and Southern lines. A characteristic addition to the 1250 class in 1961 was a sun visor to help reduce glare.

== Withdrawal & disposal ==
Two were withdrawn in the early 1980s, donating parts to the rebuild of the single 1225 class locomotive. The remainder were withdrawn in 1987. Two units have been preserved:

- 1262 was retained by the Queensland Rail Heritage Division and is on static display as a cutaway at the Workshops Rail Museum, North Ipswich
- 1263 is owned by the Australian Railway Historical Society and stored in Townsville

== Status table ==
Number	Serial number	In service	Withdrawn	Scrapped	Notes
1250	A.025	22 July 1959	20 March 1987	December 1989	
1251	A.026	27 August 1959	16 November 1987	December 1989	
1252	A.027	21 September 1959	12 October 1980	September 1985	
1253	A.028	4 November 1959	24 September 1987	December 1989	
1254	A.029	30 December 1959	3 November 1987	December 1989	
1255	A.043	4 September 1960	6 November 1987	December 1990	
1256	A.044	4 November 1960	6 November 1987	December 1990	
1257	A.045	24 November 1960	24 November 1987	December 1990	
1258	A.046	15 December 1960	5 November 1987	December 1990	
1259	A.047	27 January 1961	11 September 1987	December 1989	
1260	A.048	26 September 1961	16 November 1987	December 1990	
1261	A.049	26 September 1961	16 November 1987	December 1990	
1262	A.050	27 October 1961	3 November 1987		Preserved, Queensland Rail Heritage Division, Workshops Rail Museum
1263	A.051	22 November 1961	16 November 1987		Preserved, Australian Railway Historical Society
1264	A.052	18 April 1962	20 November 1987	December 1990	
1265	A.074	25 July 1963	21 September 1987	December 1989	
1266	A.075	31 July 1963	7 October 1987	December 1989	
