= BHP Port Kembla D34 class =

Australian diesel locomotive

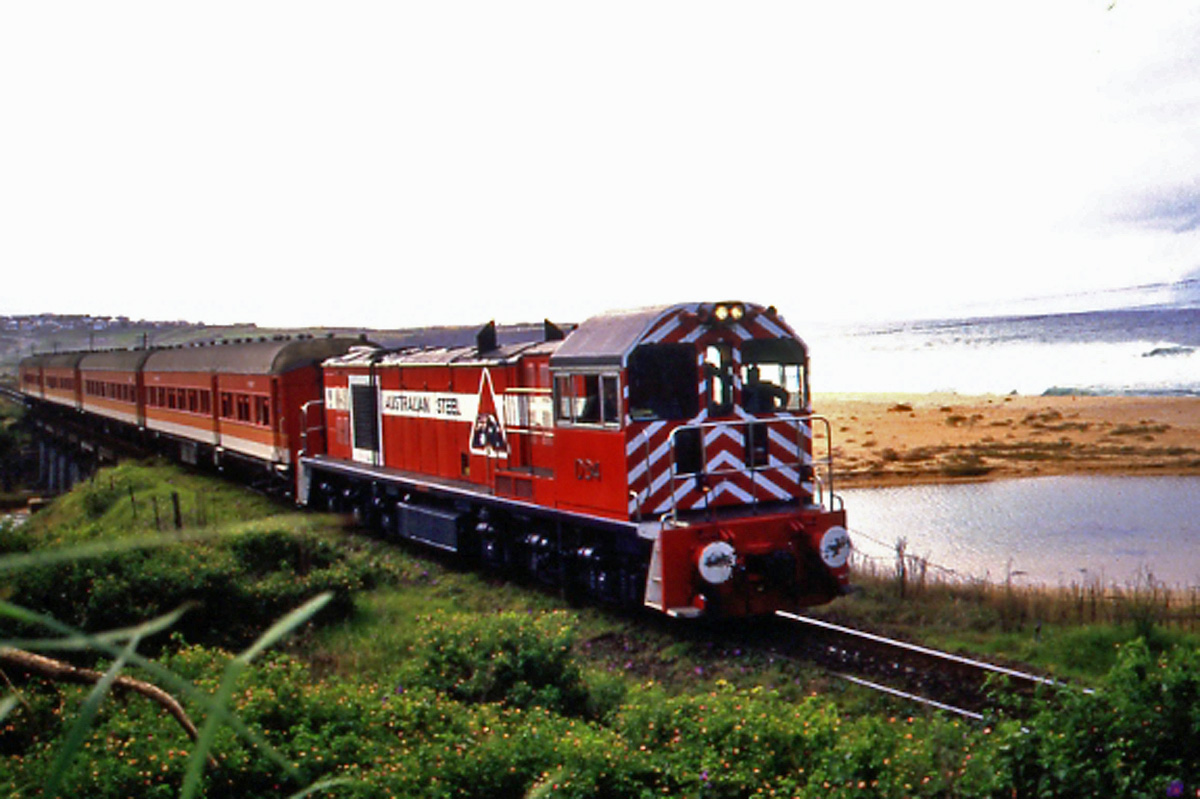
- D34 hauling a passenger train on the South Coast line
Type and origin
- Power type: Diesel-electric
- Builder: English Electric, Rocklea
- Build date: 1969
- Total produced: 1
Specifications
- Configuration
  - UIC: Co-Co
- Gauge: 1,435 mm (4 ft 8 1/2 in) standard gauge
- Wheel diameter: 3 ft 1 1/2 in (952 mm)
- Minimum curve: 250 ft (76.20 m)
- Wheelbase: 12 ft 6 in (3.81 m) bogie
- Length: 54 ft (16.46 m) over headstocks
- Width: 9 ft 6 in (2,896 mm)
- Height: 13 ft 11 in (4,242 mm)
- Axle load: 21.5 long tons (21.8 tonnes; 24.1 short tons)
- Loco weight: 130 long tons (132.1 tonnes; 145.6 short tons)
- Fuel type: Diesel
- Fuel capacity: 1,120 imp gal (5,100 L; 1,350 US gal)
- Prime mover: English Electric 12CSVT Mk II
- RPM range: 450 - 850rpm
- Engine type: four stroke, V12 four valves per cylinder
- Aspiration: turbocharged, intercooled
- Generator: EE822/16J
- Traction motors: EE548
- Cylinders: 12
- Cylinder size: 10 in × 12 in (254 mm × 305 mm)
- MU working: 110 V, stepless electro-pneumatic throttle
- Loco brake: Air, dynamic
- Train brakes: Air
Performance figures
- Maximum speed: 30 miles per hour (48 km/h)
- Power output: 2,025 hp (1,510 kW) gross, 1,850 hp (1,380 kW) net
- Tractive effort: 57,000 lbf (253.5 kN) at 9.4 mph (20 km/h)
Career
- Operators: Australian Iron & Steel
- Number in class: 1
- Numbers: D34
- First run: 30 April 1969
- Preserved: D34
- Disposition: 1 preserved

D34 was a diesel locomotive built by English Electric, Rocklea for Australian Iron & Steel's, Port Kembla steelworks in 1969.

== History ==
In 1969, Australian Iron & Steel purchased D34, which was similar to the R class that English Electric were building for the Western Australian Government Railways. It was the largest locomotive operated by Australian Iron & Steel to haul coal trains from Kemira, Nebo and Wongawilli collieries to Port Kembla.

In April 2011, D34 was sold to the Lithgow State Mine Heritage Park & Railway.
