= CP Class 1800 =

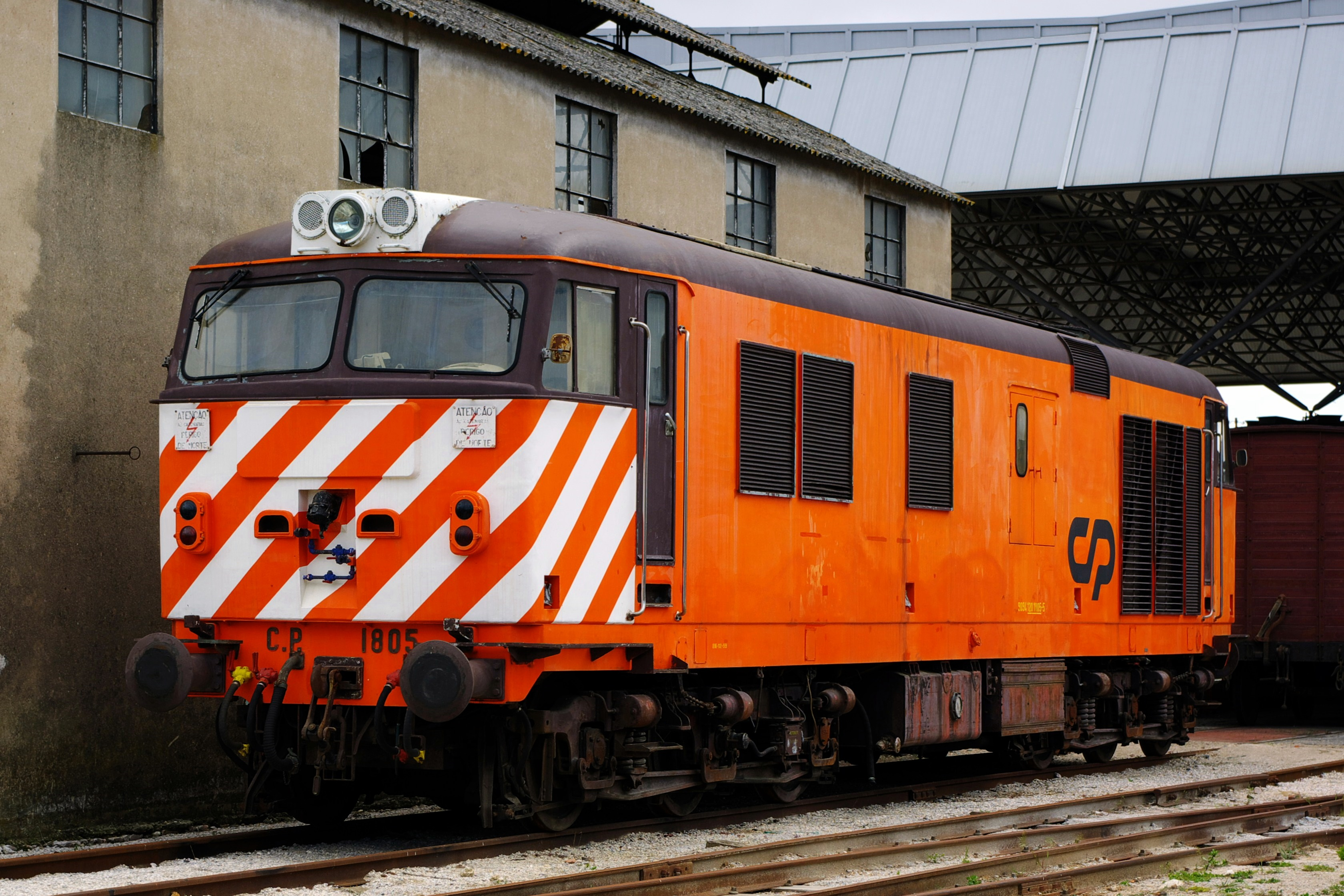
- Class 1800 locomotive number 1805 in 2009
Type and origin
- Power type: Diesel-electric
- Designer: English Electric
- Build date: 1968
Specifications
- Configuration
  - Commonwealth: Co+Co
- Gauge: 1,668 mm (5 ft 5 21/32 in) Iberian gauge
- Axle load: 18.5 long tons (18.8 t; 20.7 short tons)
- Loco weight: 110 long tons (111.8 t; 123.2 short tons)
- Fuel type: Diesel
- Fuel capacity: 1,000 imp gal (4,500 L)
- Prime mover: English Electric 16CSVT Mk II
- RPM
  - RPM idle: 450 rpm
  - Maximum RPM: 850 rpm
- Engine type: four stroke, four valves per cylinder
- Aspiration: turbocharged, intercooled
- Generator: EE822/16J
- Traction motors: EE548
- Cylinders: V16
- Cylinder size: 10 in × 12 in (254 mm × 305 mm)
- MU working: 110V, stepless electro-pneumatic throttle
- Loco brake: Air, dynamic
- Train brakes: Vacuum
Performance figures
- Maximum speed: 87 miles per hour (140 km/h)
- Power output: 2,700 hp (2,000 kW) gross, 2,500 hp (1,900 kW) net
- Tractive effort
  - Starting: 57,320 lbf (255.0 kN)
  - Continuous: 38,800 lbf (172.6 kN) at 19 mph (30 km/h)
Career
- Operators: Comboios de Portugal
- Class: Série 1800
- Locale: Portugal
- Withdrawn: 2001
- Disposition: 1 preserved, 9 scrapped

The Série 1800 was a class of 10 diesel-electric locomotives built for the Portuguese Railways (CP) in 1968. Designed and engineered by English Electric, they were closely modelled on the British Rail Class 50 locomotives but built for CP's 1,668 mm (5 ft 5 21/32 in) Iberian gauge and larger loading gauge than possible in Great Britain.

Like the British Rail Class 50s, they were equipped with an English Electric 16 CSVT engine and produced 2700 hp. Unlike the Class 50 locomotives, which made extensive use of electronic control, the Portuguese locomotives were equipped with conventional control gear. The main generator and the traction motors were identical to those used on the BR Type 3 and Deltic locomotives. The Série 1800 locomotives were built to be closely compatible with the smaller CP Série 1400 (themselves based on the British Rail Class 20) and also to use as many common components as possible. When delivered they were the only diesel locomotives in Portugal authorised to run at 140 km/h (87 mph).

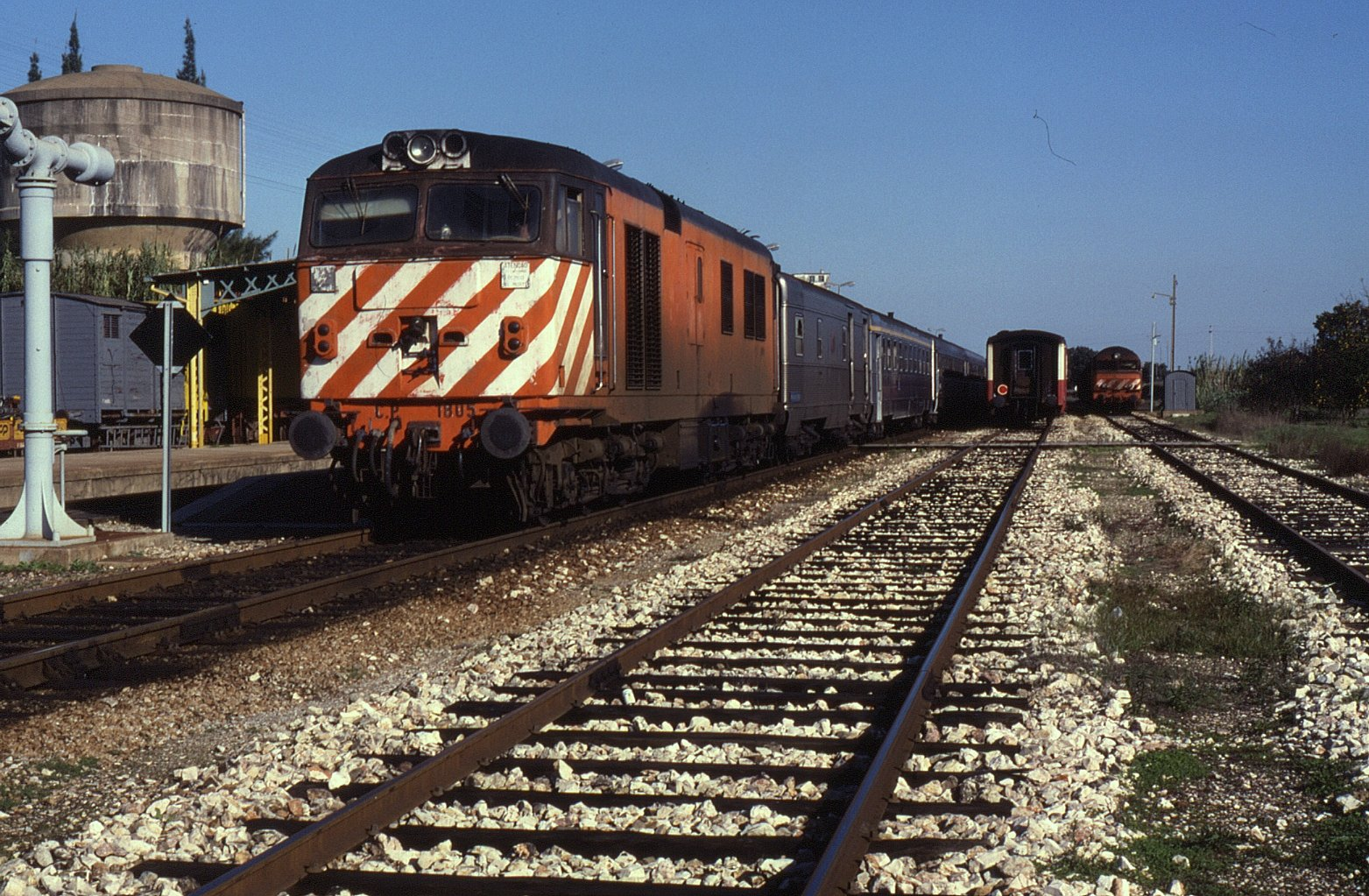
En route from Barreiro to Vila Real de Santo António on 27 November 1990, 1805 pauses at Ermidas Sado where it was booked to cross over with a northbound train.

By mid-1969, the class had logged more than 4 million kilometres in regular use and had proven their worth by hauling heavier and faster trains than other locomotive classes for CP.

Initially they were used on the express services on the main line between Barreiro (near Lisbon) and Faro. After the electrification of the main line the locomotives were relegated to Inter Regional services in the Algarve. They were also used on the steeply-graded Beira Alta line, but were displaced by the more powerful Série 1960 locomotives in the late 1970s.

Apart from one which suffered serious accident damage, the Série 1800s were all withdrawn in 2001.

A single example is now part of the CP Railway Museum collection and has been repainted into the original blue livery. All others have been or are being scrapped (as of late 2012/early 2013).
