= Archer Park Rail Museum =

Museum in Queensland

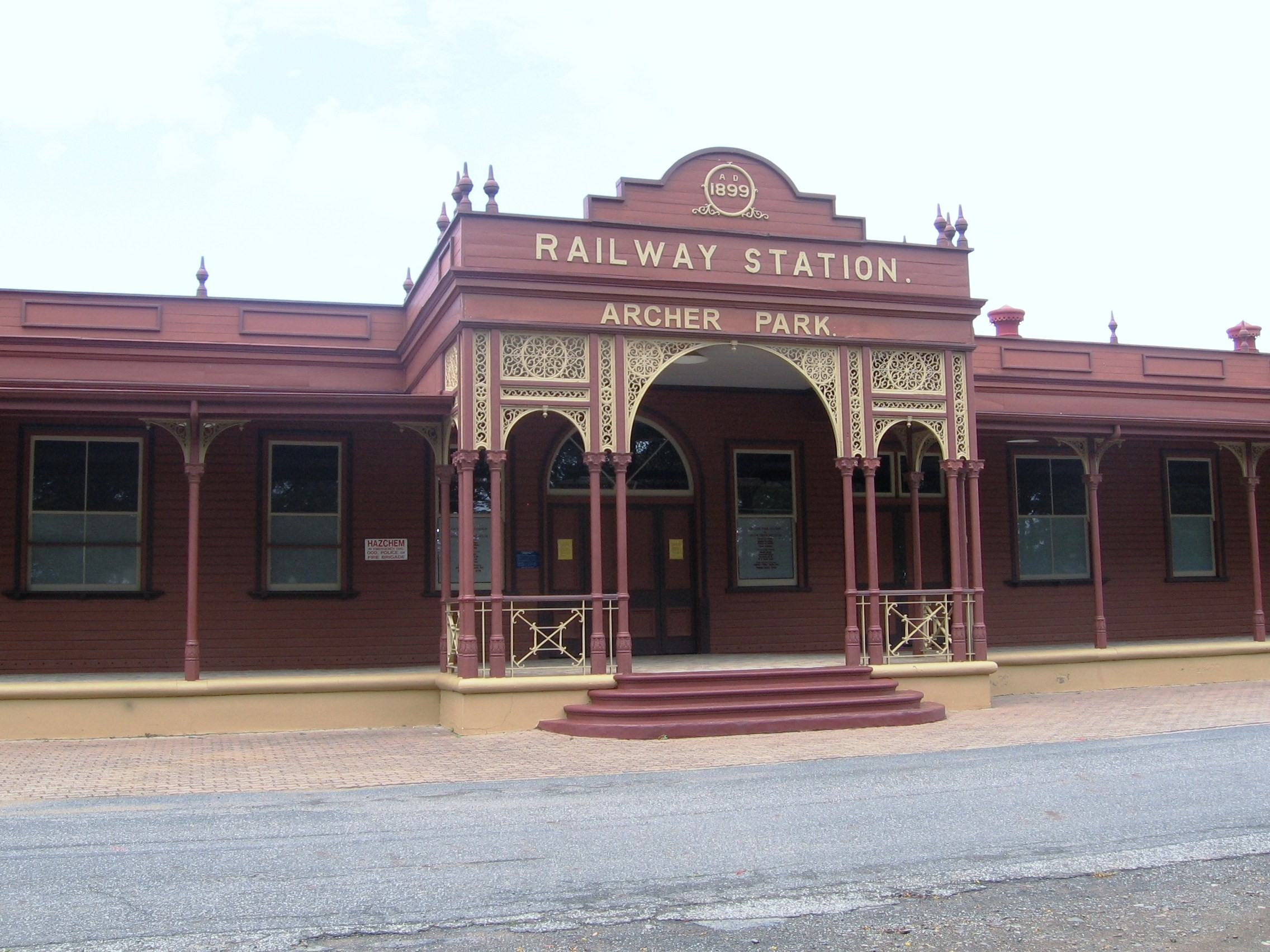
- Archer Park Railway Station and Museum, 2009
- Location: Denison Street, Rockhampton, Rockhampton Region, Queensland, Australia
- Coordinates: 23.3758°S 150.5069°E
- Website: https://archerparkrailmuseum.com

History
- Design period: 1870s–1890s (late 19th century)
- Built: 1897–1908

Site notes
- Architectural style: Classicism

Queensland Heritage Register
- Official name: Archer Park Railway Station, Rockhampton Central Railway Station
- Type: state heritage (landscape, built)
- Designated: 21 October 1992
- Reference no.: 600777
- Significant period: 1897–1970 (historical); 1897–ongoing (social); 1890s–1910s (fabric)
- Significant components: loading bay/dock, trees/plantings, machinery/plant/equipment – transport – rail, office/s, carriage shade (railway), railway station, store/s / storeroom / storehouse, railway refreshment room/s, platform, furniture/fittings, track

Archer Park Railway Museum is a heritage-listed former railway station and now transport museum at Denison Street, Rockhampton, Rockhampton Region, Queensland, Australia. It was built from 1897 to 1908. It was known as Archer Park railway station and Rockhampton Central railway station. It was added to the Queensland Heritage Register on 21 October 1992.

The Museum's main attraction is a rare French Purrey steam tram reconstructed using parts from the original fleet of steam trams operated by Rockhampton City Council between 1909 and 1939.

== History ==
Archer Park Railway Station, the former Rockhampton Central Railway Station, is situated on Denison Street and forms an important link with the social, cultural and transport history of Rockhampton and Central Queensland. It was the major railway station in Rockhampton from the turn of the century until the mid 1920s, and is an important element in the development of the railway network in Queensland, and the growth of the North Coast Railway in the early part of the twentieth century.

The Archer brothers had made a private expedition to the Rockhampton district in 1853, and were the first Europeans to record and chart the Fitzroy River. The Archers were also the first European pastoralists to arrive in the area. Their establishment of Gracemere Station led to further pastoral expansion into the area.

After the short lived Canoona gold rush of 1858, Rockhampton was proclaimed as a town and declared a port of entry in 1858. Following the gold rush, the town of Rockhampton developed as an entry and export town for central Queensland. Rockhampton continued to eclipse its nearest rival Gladstone for nearly a century as the principal port for Central Queensland.

In 1863, the Parliament of Queensland passed the controversial Railway Bill, which committed Queensland to the use of a narrow gauge for the development of its Main Line railway in Queensland. Other colonies in Australia at this time had adopted broader gauges for use on their rail networks. The reasoning behind this decision was that a narrow gauge would have lower construction costs.

The first section of the Queensland railway network was opened between Ipswich and Bigges Camp (now Grandchester) on 31 July 1865, and later extended to link the towns of Warwick, Dalby and Toowoomba with Ipswich. At the time that the Railway Act had been passed, the 5000 citizens of Rockhampton objected to having no provision made for the construction of a railway to their hinterland, where copper was being exploited in the Peak Downs area. A railway was thought necessary to ensure development of the interior.

The first length of Central Western railway line was opened to Westwood some 30 miles (48 km) from Rockhampton in 1867. The line was extended beyond the coastal ranges in 1872, reaching Emerald in 1879. The Central Western Railway was progressively extended further west reaching Longreach in 1892, and remained an isolated railway system, with no connection to the southern division of Queensland railways until 1903.

In 1882, after Brisbane had acquired a railway to the seaside at Sandgate, Rockhampton clamoured for a similar connection to its resort at Emu Park. Construction of the Emu Park railway line was approved in 1885 and the line opened in 1888. The 1880s was a period of economic and civic expansion in Rockhampton as a result of the discovery and exploitation of the gold and ore body at Mount Morgan in the Dee Range forty kilometres from Rockhampton.

The line, similar to Bundaberg, featured a railway system divided by a major river. This consisted of a line running from a terminus in Stanley Street, Rockhampton to Gracemere and westwards, and the line at North Rockhampton to Emu Park with no physical connection. Two years after the opening of the Emu Park line, the Railway Department began investigating the possibility of linking Rockhampton's two separate railways. The bridging of the Fitzroy River and the cost of land resumptions to join the two terminus stations were to be major difficulties in connecting the two lines.

Trial surveys in 1890 investigated two routes, but the Australian banking crisis of 1893 forestalled further work. The impetus for bridging the Fitzroy River came from the decision of the Queensland Government to construct a deepwater port at Broadmount (now Thompson Point) at the mouth of the Fitzroy River in 1894, and to link the Central Railway with North Rockhampton via a bridge across the Fitzroy and a line running via Denison Street. The original plan called for a single line down Denison Street and for a single track bridge, however the Rockhampton City Council protested against this decision. Following a visit to Rockhampton by railway engineer Henry Charles Stanley, the management of the Lakes Creek Meatworks at North Rockhampton convinced the Railway Department to construct a double line to North Rockhampton, as it was felt that developments in livestock and goods traffic would justify the initial outlay. In 1895, construction was approved for what was to be known as the Rockhampton Junction Railway. The new bridge and connecting line were the first examples of double lines outside of the Brisbane-Ipswich metropolitan area. The Rockhampton City Council gave half of Leichhardt Park (now Archer Park) and Denison Street which allowed for the construction of a central railway station. The Council approved this work in October 1896.

The future station at Archer Park was first sketched out in 1897 in Brisbane. The concept developed was for a station separate from the main line down Denison Street, but connected via a loop line crossing the southbound line by crossovers and slip points. A single platform was to be provided 300 feet (91 m) long and 20 feet (6.1 m) wide, with an arched carriage shade running full length of the platform. The track to the platform and the three track loop line left only a small strip of roadway available along Denison Street. The plan was subsequently altered to allow for a larger space for vehicular traffic on Denison Street.

An amended plan for the station building was prepared in late 1897. This incorporated a station building 140 feet (43 m) long, with a 10 feet (3.0 m) wide verandah running its full length along the street elevation. A cloak room was also added to the plan.

Final plans were produced in 1898 by architect Henrik Hansen (1843–?). Hansen had joined the Queensland Railways in 1877, and was responsible for the design of many utilitarian buildings and structures. He was also responsible for the design of the railway stations at Mount Morgan (1898), Cunnamulla (1898) and Winton (1898), the refreshment rooms at Toowoomba (1900), and Emerald railway station (1900). Hansen was also involved in the design of the new North Ipswich Railway Workshops (c.1901–13). Hansen was retrenched in 1904. Similar features of the stations designed by Hansen, particularly at Mount Morgan, Cunnamulla and Winton, included an all-over arch roof or carriage shade, designed to provide cover to passengers and goods being loaded at the platform.

The tender for construction of the Rockhampton Junction Railway was awarded to GC Willcocks in 1897. The contract involved the construction of the branch to Broadmount, the Denison Street line, and the Alexandra Railway Bridge. Construction was delayed until 1898 on the bridge due to flooding on the Fitzroy River.

Tenders were called in September 1897 for the construction of a residence for a station master for Archer Park. Thomas McWatters won the contract for £520, and the building was completed in sixteen weeks. In July 1898 tenders were called for the erection of a signal cabin at Archer Park, and one tender was received from Watson and McDonald for £168. The system of interlocking signalling and pointworks led to discussions between HC Stanley and Traffic Manager Thallon in 1898. Thallon had suggested to deviate the mainline so as to enter Archer Park railway station, to avoid running interlocking gear and signal wires along Denison Street. However the original plan to enable trains to run along Denison Street without entering Archer Park was retained.

Tenders were called for the Rockhampton Central Station in February 1899. Thomas Butterworth Renshaw and Harry Ricketts submitted a tender of £4,130. Electric lighting of the station was considered during construction; however gas was installed instead.

The Rockhampton Junction Railway was officially opened on 6 November 1899. With the completion of the Alexandra Railway Bridge, the Emu Park and Central Railway provided a unified rail link between the two-halves of Rockhampton. The Archer Park station was not ready for the opening of the Junction Railway, and no official opening ceremony was held; however the station was opened for the use of the public from 11 December 1899. The official name Archer Park was adopted in October 1899, rather than Leichhardt Park, from which it was resumed.

Being the central station for Rockhampton, Archer Park superseded the Stanley Street station not long after its construction. Mail trains to Brisbane departed from Archer Park following completion of the Gladstone-Rockhampton link in 1903. Archer Park was designed as a passenger station, and did not handle goods traffic apart from parcels and mail. The station was also important as the departure and terminating point for services to Mount Morgan, Emu Park and the local suburban services to Lakes Creek at North Rockhampton. Excursions to the seaside at Emu Park and later Yeppoon were also extremely popular.

In 1906, plans were drawn up to extend the building to provide for a refreshment room. The refreshment room was to be provided at the northern end of the station building, and was to include a bar for patrons. The rooms opened in 1908, and were leased by private operators until the Government established the Railway Refreshment Room services in 1916.

Denison Street was to be a major problem for train operations within Rockhampton. As the route of the railway was along a major thoroughfare across several open level crossings, trains were limited to a maximum speed of 10 miles per hour (16 km/h). Trains were also required to provide an audible signal to warn motorists and pedestrians along Denison Street of their passage. The warning was given by the fireman on the engine ringing a brass hand bell.

The Central Western Line continued to expand throughout the early part of the twentieth century. Prior to 1922, up to twenty five daily departures and arrivals could be recorded at Archer Park. By 1922 the station layout at Archer Park was too restrictive to handle the increasing length of passenger and mail trains. With the completion of the North Coast Line from Rockhampton to Mackay in 1921, operational difficulties were increased as the length of mail trains frequently fouled the crossover, leading to the blocking of the main line. The length of trains also meant that vision between the signalman on duty and the driver of trains was obscured.

As the signal cabin for Archer Park was situated on the western side of the station loop lines, firemen looking back along the length of the train were unable to be given a proceed signal. To assist in the problem of observing passing trains on the main line in Denison Street, sheets of galvanised iron were removed to open up a view from the platform area.

The Stanley Street station was enlarged in 1923 to cater for longer trains, and two 600 feet (180 m) long platforms were provided. The station was further enlarged between 1924 and 1928, making it the major station in Rockhampton. The long distance mail and passenger trains all departed from the Stanley Street station leaving Archer Park to cater for more local services.

During the Second World War Archer Park station was again utilised for services to cope with the dispatch and transport of allied army troops stationed in the Rockhampton area.

The signal cabin on the Denison Street side of the station was moved into the station building in 1956. Prior to this the station had been downgraded in staffing in the early 1950s as an economy measure. The movement of the cabin had been protested by union representatives, as it would have also meant the loss of signalmen jobs. The move first proposed in 1922, and again in the early 1950s was accomplished by the end of 1956.

Further staff reductions took place in 1957. At the same time, the General Manager for the Central Division recommended that only local passenger and railmotor services operate to and from Archer Park with all other services to by-pass the station. Summer traffic to Emu Park and Yeppoon maintained regular departures from the station as in the early part of the century. Most traffic was now generated from services to Mount Morgan, St Lawrence, and the Sunday-only train to Mackay.

Branch line closures in the Central Division further reduced train services from the station. The Emu Park line was closed in 1964 due to falling revenue, and with the withdrawal of the railmotor service from Archer Park to St Lawrence in 1968, the only trains to operate were Yeppoon services. The Yeppoon railmotor was withdrawn in 1969, and with no passenger services operating from the station, the decision was taken to close the station as of 2 February 1970. Tenders were invited in 1970 to attract a suitable lessee for Archer Park, but no offers were forthcoming. The station was then used as a freight terminal for a door to door service being developed by Queensland Railways. Every second post on the Denison Street side of the carriage shade was removed to facilitate vehicle access. Rooms in the station building were also used for storage. No maintenance was to be carried out on the building at the request of Queensland Railways.

Filling was placed at the northern end of the platform to allow motor vehicles access to the station area. In 1974, Queensland Railfast Express Pty Ltd were given a lease of the station area north of the entry vestibule. Partitions were removed in the refreshment rooms and the floor strengthened. Archer Park was the headquarters for QRX and its freight operations in Rockhampton from 1976 until 1989.

From 1982 until QRX vacated the site in 1989, local residents protested over noise and inconvenience generated from the freight activities on site. Rockhampton City Council made approaches to Queensland Railways for the station and yard to be developed as a museum complex. QRX found alternative accommodation at a location near Port Curtis Junction, and financed its move with assistance from Queensland Railways. Archer Park closed as a freight terminal and station on 14 January 1990. Mechanical and electric semaphore signalling was placed out of use, along with all points and crossovers leading into the station.

On 1 May 1990, Queensland Railways handed over the Archer Park station to the Rockhampton City Council as part of a plan to develop a museum on site. In 1996, conservation and refurbishment work was carried on the station building and carriage shed. The eastern or southbound main line along Denison Street was removed by Queensland Rail as part of its Main Line Upgrade programme. A section of the line three blocks in length was retained linking Archer Park station to its loop line; however all physical connection with the North Coast Line has now been removed.

== Description ==
Archer Park Railway Station, bounded by Denison, Cambridge and Archer Streets, consists of a main station building which has a railway platform to the southwest and a verandah entrance to the northeast. Both the platform and tracks are covered by a steel framed carriage shade which runs the full length of the station.

The station building is a single-storeyed chamferboard structure supported on brick or timber stumps. The building has a corrugated iron hipped roof, with galvanised iron ridge ventilators, concealed behind a parapet surmounting a deep entablature. The parapet was originally surmounted by finials which are no longer extant. The front entrance of the building, which faces the adjacent Defence Reserve to the northeast, has a raised verandah which runs the full length of the original 1899 structure. The main entrance is located in the centre of the building, and consists of a projecting portico surmounted by a shaped timber gable with the date and title "A.D. 1899 RAILWAY STATION" in raised lettering. The portico is accessed via central concrete steps, and has paired cast iron columns flanking a wide central arch, with narrower arches to either side, and a timber lined ceiling. The arches are formed by delicate filigree cast iron valances, and fine cross-braced metal balustrading is located between the columns.

The verandah has similar cast iron columns, with cast iron brackets, supporting a corrugated iron skillion roof. The cast iron columns also act as downpipes for the verandah roof, and discharge into pipework built into the concrete verandah. The portico and verandah floor is finished in hexagonal concrete tiles, some sections of which have been removed. The northern and southern wings of the building have tall sash windows opening onto the verandah, with a single timber panelled door with fanlight (a converted sash window) to the southern wing. The northern wing has paired timber doors with fanlight accessing a luggage passage adjacent to the entry vestibule.

An extension containing the former refreshment rooms, which opened in 1908, is attached to the northern end of the building. This extension is similar in detailing to the original structure, but without the northeast verandah. The northeast elevation windows, while having the appearance of sashes, are fitted with a patent device (magic stays) which raises and pivots the lower sash against the upper sash. These windows have hoods, and a corrugated iron lean-to garage has been added to the northern end, replacing the wood, coal and coke yard.

The southern end of the building has a loading bay separating the men's toilet block and store from the main station building, all of which front the railway platform. The northern end of the building originally had a similar arrangement, providing a lamp room and store, but was altered with the construction of the extension containing the refreshment rooms. The loading bay has a cantilevered corrugated iron awning, with corrugated iron cladding enclosing the wall surface above to the underside of the carriage shade. The toilet block and store has corrugated iron wall cladding with metal louvred ventilation panels, and is roofed by a skillion with projecting twin gables with raised ridge ventilators. The gable ends have louvred panels and finials, and a glass rooflight is located between the gables lighting the urinals below.

The carriage shade is constructed of curved steel roof trusses supported on timber posts, and is sheeted with corrugated iron with a raised central ridge ventilator. The carriage shade has a corrugated iron valance along its southwest side, and a curved corrugated iron valance at either end. The structure currently covers the railway platform and single line of track, but originally a second line of track was also covered with a third line to the southwest of the structure. Every second post on the southwest side has been removed for access purposes, with the exception of the centre and end bays which have cross-bracing to stabilise the structure. There were originally highlight windows to the carriage shade, but these have also been removed. The railway platform has a concrete upstand, and originally was finished with hexagonal concrete tiles similar to the verandah, but these are no longer extant. The platform has been trenched in front of the signal box, which is situated on the southwest side of the station building fronting the former ticket and parcels office, creating a pit for control rods which has been covered with timber boarding. The signal box replaced the original free- standing structure which was located on the southwestern side of the carriage shade.

The main entrance has paired timber panelled doors, flanked by hinged timber side panels, and surmounted by a large arched glass fanlight. Tall sash windows are located either side of the entrance doors. Internally the building has boarded ceilings, with vertically jointed boarding to most of the walls, and rainwater heads protrude into the rooms along the northeast side of the building. The entrance vestibule has timber posts with cast iron brackets to the railway platform, and a low timber wall surmounted by a metal balustrade screens the luggage passage adjacent. Paired timber doors with fanlight open from the luggage passage to the former cloak room on the northern side. Two sash ticket windows with cantilevered timber counters access the former ticket and parcels office to the south of the entrance vestibule, with small hinged doors below.

The railway platform has tall sash windows, some of which have been painted out, and timber panelled doors with fanlights open from the adjoining offices and service rooms. Rainwater heads, draining the box gutter between the station building and the carriage shade, protrude into the platform area, with the downpipe inset into the station building wall. The signal box protrudes from the station building on a raised concrete base, and has sliding multi-paned windows to three sides.

The former ticket and parcels office has much of its original joinery, including benches to the ticket windows, and shelving. The raised signal box, which protrudes from the southwest side of the room, contains control levers and is accessed via timber steps to a platform with timber handrail. The adjacent former station masters office contains some early fittings including a timber screen fronting the southwest door, a corner basin, and a corner zinc coated shelf. The former cloak room originally had a central dividing wall, which separated a former ladies waiting room, and a timber panelled door with fanlight accesses the ladies toilet at the northern end.

The ladies toilet contains three cubicles, one of which contains an original earth closet which is not in use, another has been converted into a WC, and the third has been removed. An unpainted rear sanitary service passage, originally for the service of the earth closets, is located behind the cubicles. The service passage has a low narrow door opening onto the verandah, which replaced an earlier door which opened at the base of the verandah steps. An adjacent store opens onto the railway platform, and an opening has been created into the former refreshment rooms which is currently one large open space. This space originally contained a refreshment room, bar, two bedrooms, pantry store and kitchen. Paired timber doors open to the northeast, and sections of the room are currently unlined.

The men's toilet block and store at the southern end of the building has corrugated iron wall cladding over a timber frame. The toilet block has a concrete floor, and four cubicles with timber partitions. A sanitary service passage is located behind the cubicles, but the doorway providing access has been sheeted over with corrugated iron. A store has been created by partitioning off the southern end of the toilets.

The surrounds include a driveway and parking area on the northeastern side between Archer and Cambridge Streets, providing access to the front entrance. A number of trees are located scattered along the boundary with the adjacent Defence Reserve, and towards the southern end of the site. The carriage shade area has been enclosed with a high chain wire fence, and the ground to the southwest of the structure has been concreted.

A section of the eastern or southbound main line along Denison Street remains in front of Archer Park Station, linking it to its loop line.

== Heritage listing ==
Archer Park Railway Station was listed on the Queensland Heritage Register on 21 October 1992 having satisfied the following criteria.

The place is important in demonstrating the evolution or pattern of Queensland's history.

Archer Park Railway Station is important in demonstrating the evolution of the railway network in central Queensland and in the city of Rockhampton. Archer Park, constructed in 1899, was the central railway station for Rockhampton and is an integral part of the original design of the Rockhampton Junction Railway, which included the double line street railway connecting Stanley Street station to the Alexandra Rail Bridge (Alexandra Railway Bridge) and North Rockhampton via Denison Street.

The place demonstrates rare, uncommon or endangered aspects of Queensland's cultural heritage.

The Denison Street double line is also a rare Australian example of road and rail traffic sharing the same corridor, and the station contains rare surviving remnants of its interlocking signalling system.

The place is important in demonstrating the principal characteristics of a particular class of cultural places.

Archer Park Railway Station demonstrates the principal characteristics of a main line railway station built in a regional city at the turn of the century, and is also a rare surviving example of the use of a curved carriage and platform shade, which was a common feature of railway stations designed by architect Henrik Hansen. Archer Park Railway Station has a special association with the life and work of Henrik Hansen, and other surviving examples of stations designed by him include Mount Morgan (Mount Morgan railway station) and Emerald (Emerald railway station, Queensland).

The place is important because of its aesthetic significance.

Archer Park Railway Station is important for its intactness, being substantially unchanged since its construction. The structure is of considerable architectural merit, and the form and fabric of the building illustrate a skilled design approach. Archer Park Railway Station is an important component of the civic centre of Rockhampton, and makes a considerable aesthetic contribution to the local streetscape and Rockhampton townscape.

The place has a strong or special association with a particular community or cultural group for social, cultural or spiritual reasons.

Archer Park Railway Station has a special association with the community of Rockhampton, and is significant as being the main passenger station in Rockhampton from 1899 until the 1920s at a time when the Queensland Railways were the major form of transport for people and freight.

== See also ==
- List of transport museums
- Trams in Rockhampton
