= Queensland DD17 class locomotive =

Class of Australian 4-6-4T locomotives

Queensland Railways DD17 class
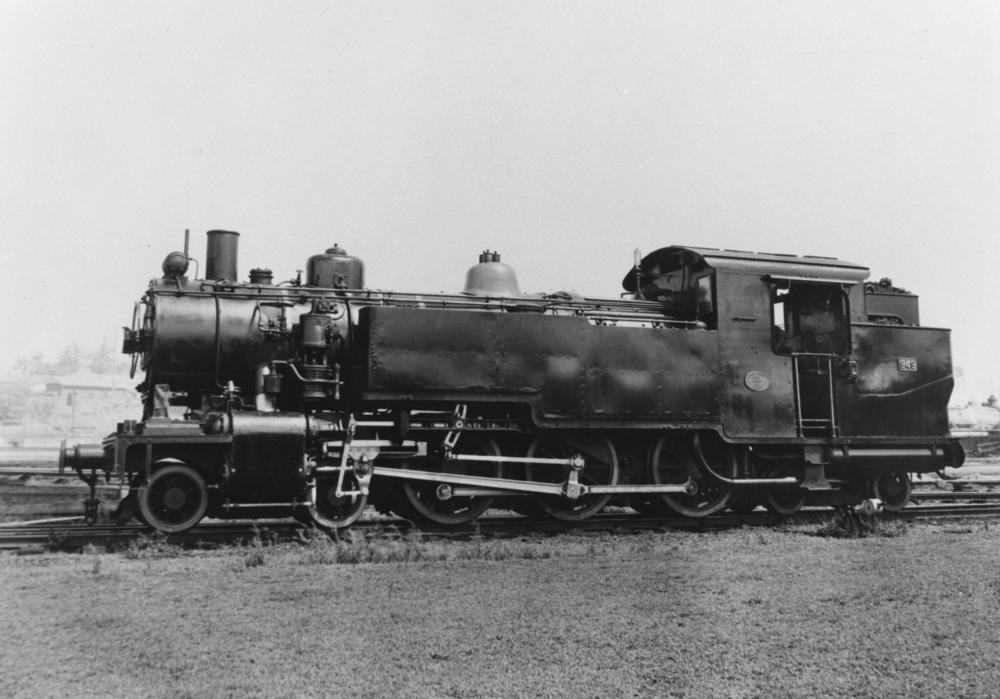
- 949
Type and origin
- Power type: Steam
- Designer: Cyril Renton
- Builder: North Ipswich Railway Workshops
- Serial number: 199-210
- Build date: 1948-1952
- Total produced: 12
Specifications
- Configuration
  - Whyte: 4-6-4T
- Gauge: 1,067 mm (3 ft 6 in)
- Driver dia.: 4 ft 3 in (1,295 mm)
- Loco weight: 62 long tons (63 t; 69 short tons)
- Fuel type: Coal
- Boiler pressure: 180 psi (1,241 kPa)
- Heating surface
  - Firebox: 18.5 sq ft (1.72 m^{2})
- Cylinders: 2 outside
- Cylinder size: 17 in (432 mm)
Performance figures
- Tractive effort: 20,800 lb (9,400 kg)
Career
- Operators: Queensland Railways
- Numbers: 949-954, 1046-1051
- Nicknames: Blue Baby
- Preserved: 1046, 1047, 1049, 1051
- Disposition: 4 preserved, 8 scrapped

The Queensland Railways DD17 class locomotive is a class of 4-6-4T steam locomotives operated by the Queensland Railways. It is an improved version of the earlier Queensland D17 locomotive.

== History ==
With the D16 and D17 class locomotives becoming life expired, between 1948 and 1952, twelve DD17s were built at North Ipswich Railway Workshops. Per Queensland Railway's classification system they were designated the DD17 class, D representing they were a tank locomotive, and the 17 the cylinder diameter in inches.

The first tank engine was painted black with red lining. The next five tanks were painted blue and the last six engines midway blue. They operated suburban passenger trains in Brisbane out of Mayne depot, mostly on the northside. They also operated freight trains in the off-peaks.

== Preservation ==
Four examples have been preserved:

- 1046 by the Zig Zag Railway, Lithgow, NSW, having been operational between 1975 and the mid-1980s. It is now dismantled.
- 1047 is stored on the Zig Zag Railway having been operational between the 1970s and the mid-1990s.
- 1049 "Stormin' Normin" is currently stored at the Zig Zag Railway. It was restored to operation in 1994 and was the workhorse of the Zig Zag railway until 2011. It is stored awaiting a major overhaul
- 1051 is currently undergoing overhaul and is part of the Queensland Rail Heritage Fleet, based at the Workshops Rail Museum.
