= D17 =

D17, or similar, may refer to:

== Vehicles ==
=== Aircraft ===
- Akaflieg Darmstadt D-17 Darmstadt, a German sailplane
- Beechcraft D17S Staggerwing, an American biplane
- Fokker D.XVII, a Dutch biplane

=== Ships ===
- Brazilian destroyer escort Beberibe (D17), a Cannon-class destroyer escort of the Brazilian Navy
- HMS Alamein (D17), a Battle-class destroyer of the Royal Navy
- HMS Quadrant (D17), a Q-class destroyer of the Royal Navy
- HMS Ulysses (D17), a U-class destroyer of the Royal Navy

=== Surface vehicles ===
- Allis-Chalmers D17, an American tractor
- LNER Class D17, an English 4-4-0 steam locomotive class
- Queensland D17 class locomotive, an Australian 4-6-4T steam locomotive

== Other uses ==
- D17 (TV channel), a French digital television channel, now CStar
- D-17B, an early computer used in missile guidance systems
- Dublin 17, a postal district in Ireland
- Lipoma, a benign tumor of adipose tissue
- D17 series of Honda D engines
