= Trams in Rockhampton =

Historic regional public transport system

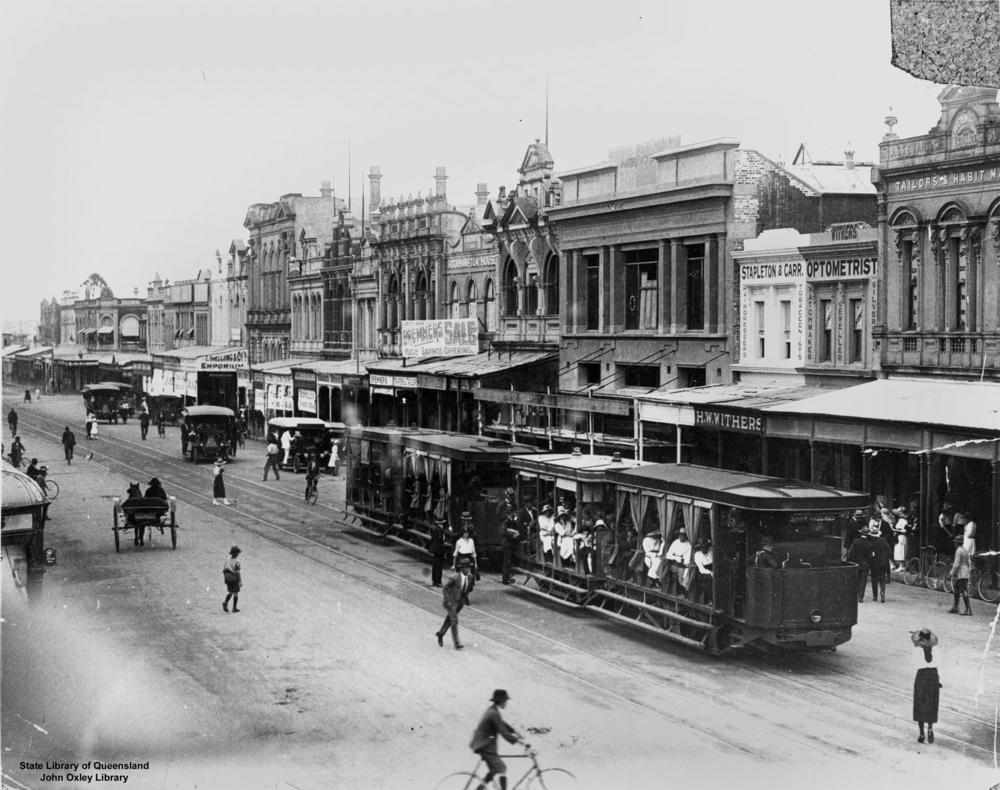
Trams and other vehicles on East Street, Rockhampton, 1923

Rockhampton Council Tramways was a steam tram service which was operated by Rockhampton City Council from 1909 until 1939 in the city of Rockhampton, Queensland, Australia. Rockhampton was the only regional city in the state of Queensland to have had a tram service. The line has since been rebuilt and is operated as a tourist attraction by the Archer Park Rail Museum.

== Early tramway proposals ==
The idea of a tramway service in Rockhampton had long been discussed prior to the official opening of the city's tramway in 1909. As early as 1881, the idea had been discussed.

In 1883, the idea of a horse-drawn tramway was proposed to link the north side of Rockhampton with the south, from Charles Street to the railway station in Stanley Street via Rockhampton City. In September 1883, the Rockhampton and Northside Tramway Company Ltd was formed.

A construction order was granted to the company in June 1884, and trackwork commenced in Yaamba Road (now Musgrave Street) near Charles Street in August 1884. The work was ultimately abandoned in 1885 and the rails that had been laid were eventually buried.

Further proposals for a Rockhampton tramway were put forward in 1897, 1900 and 1901 which included a proposal for an electric tramway system.

Rockhampton Municipal Council endorsed a proposal in 1903 to construct a tramway system using steam cars burning coke. But this proposal also stalled.

Following a council tramway committee being established in 1906, Queensland's chief railway engineer Henry Charles Stanley was commissioned by the Rockhampton Council in 1907 to investigate the feasibility of a steam tramway system in Rockhampton.

Despite debates on whether an electric system would be preferable to a steam tramway, it was recommended the self-propelled steam cars with small enclosed steam engine be used, namely the French Purrey steam cars designed by acclaimed Bordeaux manufacturer and civil engineer Valentin Purrey.

Having previously observed the Purrey steam cars in Paris, Stanley gave assurances the Purrey steam cars were clean, neat and comfortable compared to the Sydney Steam Motor Trams which ran in Sydney which Stanley described as "highly objectionable, noisy, dirty and dangerous".

== Original 1909–1939 service ==
The service was officially opened by Queensland Premier (and Member for Rockhampton) William Kidston on the morning of 5 June 1909 with the inaugural tram service departing from a decorative arch at the intersection of Bolsover and William Street in Rockhampton City and making its way to the Rockhampton Botanic Gardens on The Range.

On its first day of operation, 7,600 passengers were transported by the new tramway service.

The trams ran around a belt line of William, East, Archer and Canning Street with routes extending out to the Rockhampton Showgrounds in Wandal, the South Rockhampton Cemetery in Allenstown and up to the Rockhampton Botanic Gardens on The Range. The gauge of the track was 1,067 mm (3 ft 6.0 in).

Throughout the three decades in which the trams ran, the service struggled to be financially viable particularly when it faced competition from a new bus service in the 1920s.

In 1937, Rockhampton City Council made a unanimous decision to replace the tramway system with new diesel buses.

Rockhampton Council Tramways' final service was at 11 pm on 24 June 1939.

During its existence, the tramway service carried over 40 million passengers and travelled over 4.5 million miles while collecting over £350,000 in fares.

Following the closure of the Rockhampton tramway, the council decided to bitumen over the tram tracks, burying them due to the cost involved in removing them.

== Accidents ==
During the thirty years of operation, the trams in Rockhampton became notorious for accidents resulting in casualties – the first of which occurred just two days after the official opening in 1909 when a track worker was struck and killed by a tram.

The most notorious incident occurred on 28 September 1913 when three people were killed when a tram car capsized on a sharp bend at the corner of Ward Street and Dagmar Street after departing the Rockhampton Botanic Gardens following an afternoon performance by the Lakes Creek Brass Band. It was reported that the same tram had left the rails and crashed into a fence at the same location on an earlier occasion.

Another serious incident occurred on 8 January 1919 when a tram collided with a train at the intersection of Denison Street and Archer Street where the tram tracks intersected with the main railway line in Denison Street. Although 15 passengers were injured, there were no fatalities.

However, there were further fatal accidents involving the steam trams in 1928, 1929 and 1933.

== 1988 reconstruction ==
Interest was sparked in Rockhampton's Purrey steam trams in the early 1970s following articles published in the Australian Railway Historical Society Bulletin and Trolley Wire. The 18–35-year-old group of the Rockhampton branch of the National Trust of Australia began searching for parts of the original steam trams to reconstruct a new Purrey steam tram at the old Canning Street tram depot, in time for the Australian Bicentenary celebrations in 1988.

From 1982, Rockhampton City Council coordinated the restoration project, using grants made available to the Bicentennial Scheme and officially launched the project in June 1984 at a ball to mark 75 years of council-operated public transport in Rockhampton.

Although various parts of the original trams were successfully relocated including the collapsed body of one of the old trams, other parts were sourced from elsewhere including the steam engine unit from the Antique Machinery Society in Brisbane, and a Purrey boiler steam feedwater pump from the Ipswich railway workshops.

Two public open days were held during the steam tram's reconstruction which attracted large crowds. Following some setbacks, the tram was successfully completed on 10 May 1988 at a cost of $212,000.

On 5 June 1988, Rockhampton mayor Jim Webber officially declared the steam tram restoration complete, exactly 79 years since William Kidston had declared the city's first tram service open on 5 June 1909.

Following the official ceremony, the tram commenced one-way trips along the Denison Street railway line between Stanley Street and Fitzroy Street for a cost of $1 per trip. The tram carried 2,600 passengers between 9:30 am and 4:30 pm.

== Tourist attraction ==
During the official ceremony at the 1988 event, the general manager of local newspaper The Morning Bulletin Mike McCarthy presented a $20,000 cheque to Mayor Jim Webber to put towards constructing and establishing a permanent tourist tram route in Rockhampton.

Trolley Wire reported at the time that there were two schools of thought on how the newly built Purrey steam tram could be used as a local tourist attraction. One proposal was for the tram to run along the old railway wharf branch line down Stanley Street and then run along Quay Street parallel to the Fitzroy River past the heritage-listed buildings in the CBD. The second proposal involved the tram running from the tourist information centre in Lower Dawson Road, then skirt the Yeppen Yeppen Lagoon before terminating at the Rockhampton Botanic Gardens. It was reported the Yeppen Yeppen Lagoon proposal was the one Rockhampton City Council favoured the most.

However, the Purrey steam tram ultimately found its new home at the old Archer Park Railway Station which was handed over to Rockhampton City Council by Queensland Rail in 1990, for the purpose of transforming it into a museum.

The reconstructed tram is still housed at the Archer Park Rail Museum and operates as a tourist attraction for several hours each Sunday on 1.1 kilometres of isolated tram track between Albert Street and Fitzroy Street which runs parallel to the main line on Denison Street.

The restored tram is believed to be the last operational Purrey Steam Tram in the world.
