= Queensland D17 class locomotive =

Class of Australian 4-6-4T locomotives

Queensland Railways D17 class
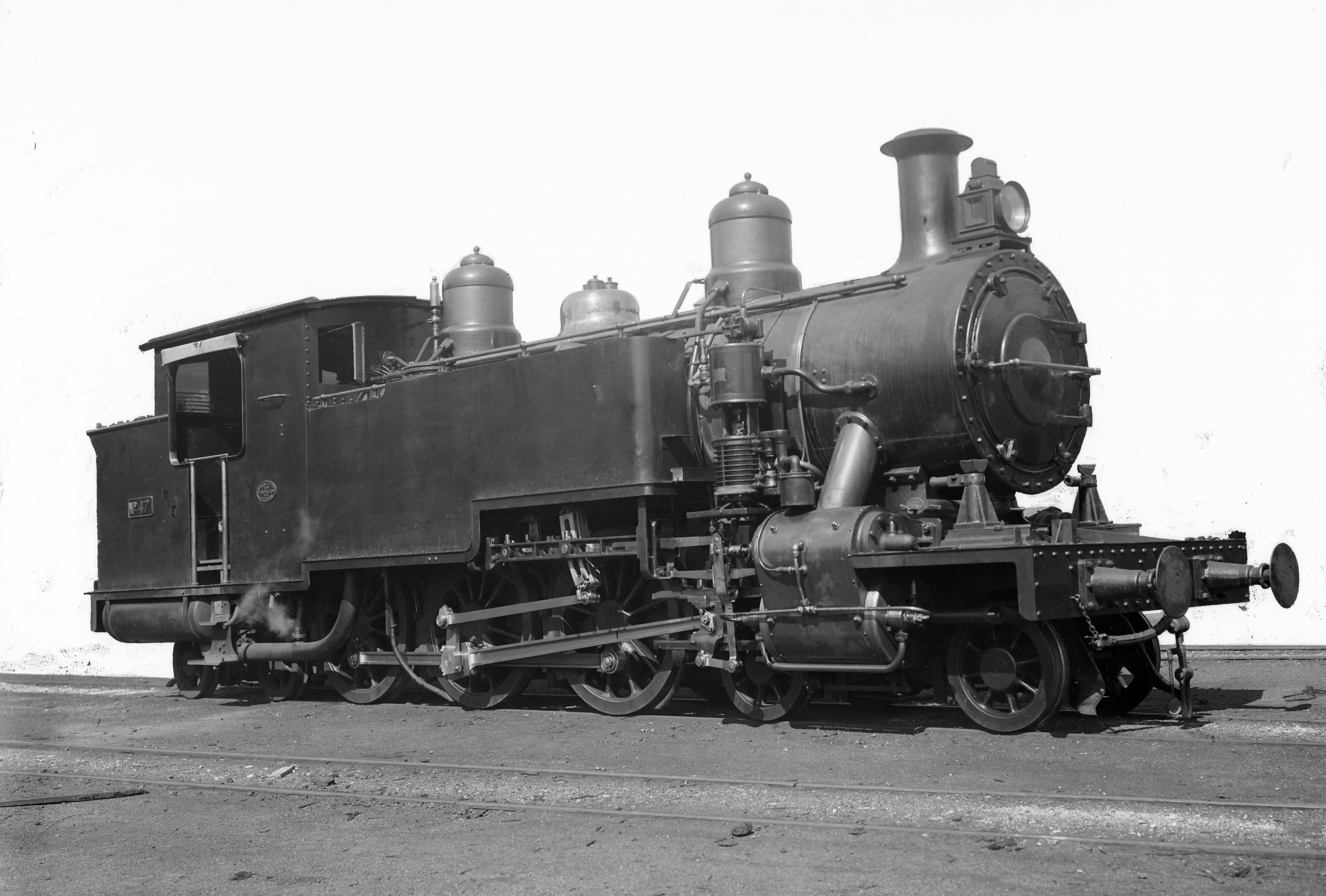
Type and origin
- Power type: Steam
- Builder: Walkers Limited (10); North Ipswich Railway Workshops (20)
- Build date: 1924-1942
- Total produced: 30
Specifications
- Configuration
  - Whyte: 4-6-4T
- Gauge: 1,067 mm (3 ft 6 in)
- Driver dia.: 4 ft 3 in (1,295 mm)
- Fuel type: Coal
- Fuel capacity: 3 t (3.0 long tons; 3.3 short tons)
- Water cap.: 1,200 imp gal (5,500 L; 1,400 US gal)
- Boiler pressure: 160 or 170 lbf/in^{2} (1,103 or 1,172 kPa)
- Cylinders: 2
- Cylinder size: 17 in × 22 in (432 mm × 559 mm)
- Valve gear: Walschaerts
Performance figures
- Tractive effort: 16,940 or 18,000 lbf (75.35 or 80.07 kN)
Career
- Operators: Queensland Railways
- Numbers: 26, 47, 53, 56, 60, 75-77, 85, 112-114, 122, 137, 260, 262, 266-269, 853-857, 882-886
- Preserved: 268, 855
- Disposition: 2 preserved, 28 scrapped

The Queensland Railways D17 class locomotive is a class of 4-6-4T steam locomotives operated by the Queensland Railways.

== History ==
Between 1924 and 1926, Walkers Limited and North Ipswich Railway Workshops each built 10 to assist the 6D16 class with increasing suburban traffic. Between 1937 and 1942 a further 10 were built at Ipswich. Per Queensland Railway's classification system they were designated the D17 class, D representing they were a tank locomotive, and the 17 the cylinder diameter in inches.

They were the only Queensland Railways class to be fitted as a whole, from new, with two sand-domes. They were restricted to the Brisbane suburban area with boundaries of Ipswich, Ferny Grove, Pinkenba, Shorncliffe, Petrie, Kingston and Lota. This area was later extended beyond Ipswich to Grandchester. Initially, all were attached to Mayne depot but later several were transferred to Woolloongabba.

Cylinder and steam chest castings are identical to C17 Class. The '6' was dropped from the classification in 1937. The engines were often unofficially referred to as "black tanks" after the introduction of the DD17 class. Engines constructed in 1937 had boilers with a pressure of 170 pounds-force per square inch (1,172 kPa). Earlier engines were altered to that pressure as they passed through workshops. A wooden crate was fixed to the centre of the bunker to slightly increase the coal capacity from the original 3 long tons (3.0 t; 3.4 short tons).

Engines of this class were some of the last to receive electric headlights due to them being restricted to running in the Brisbane suburban area. Fitting of electric headlights commenced in 1951.

The entire class was displaced from suburban duties by diesels during the 1960s. The first was withdrawn in November 1961 with the bulk of the class withdrawn during 1967 and 1968.

== Preservation ==
Two have been preserved:

- 268 by the RAILCO, Ravenshoe, currently stored along with rolling stock because operations have been suspended.
- 855 is preserved by the Australian Railway Historical Society & stored at the Rosewood Railway Museum
