= Queensland A10 Ipswich class locomotive =

Class of Australian 2-4-0 locomotive

Queensland Railways A10 Ipswich class
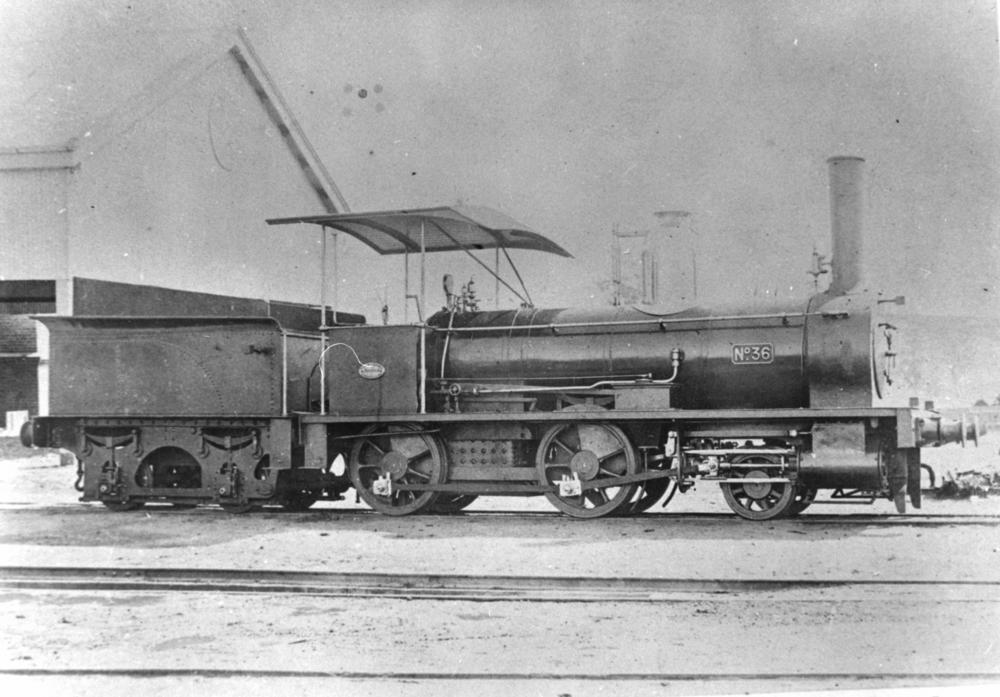
Type and origin
- Power type: Steam
- Builder: North Ipswich Railway Workshops
- Order number: 1
- Build date: 1877
- Total produced: 1
Specifications
- Configuration
  - Whyte: 2-4-0
- Gauge: 1,067 mm (3 ft 6 in)
- Fuel type: Coal
- Cylinders: 2 outside
- Cylinder size: 10 in × 18 in (254 mm × 457 mm)
Career
- Operators: Queensland Railways
- Numbers: 132
- Disposition: Scrapped

The Queensland Railways A10 Ipswich class locomotive was a one-off 2-4-0 steam locomotive operated by the Queensland Railways.

== History ==
In 1877, the North Ipswich Railway Workshops built a one-off 2-4-0 steam locomotive entering service on the Southern & Western Railway numbered 36. In 1880 it was sent to the then isolated Bundaberg line and renumbered 3. In 1890, as part of the Queensland Railways renumbering scheme, it was renumbered 132. It was sold to McArdle & Thompson in February 1881, being resold to Fairymead Sugar Mill in 1892.
