= Mount Morgan railway station =

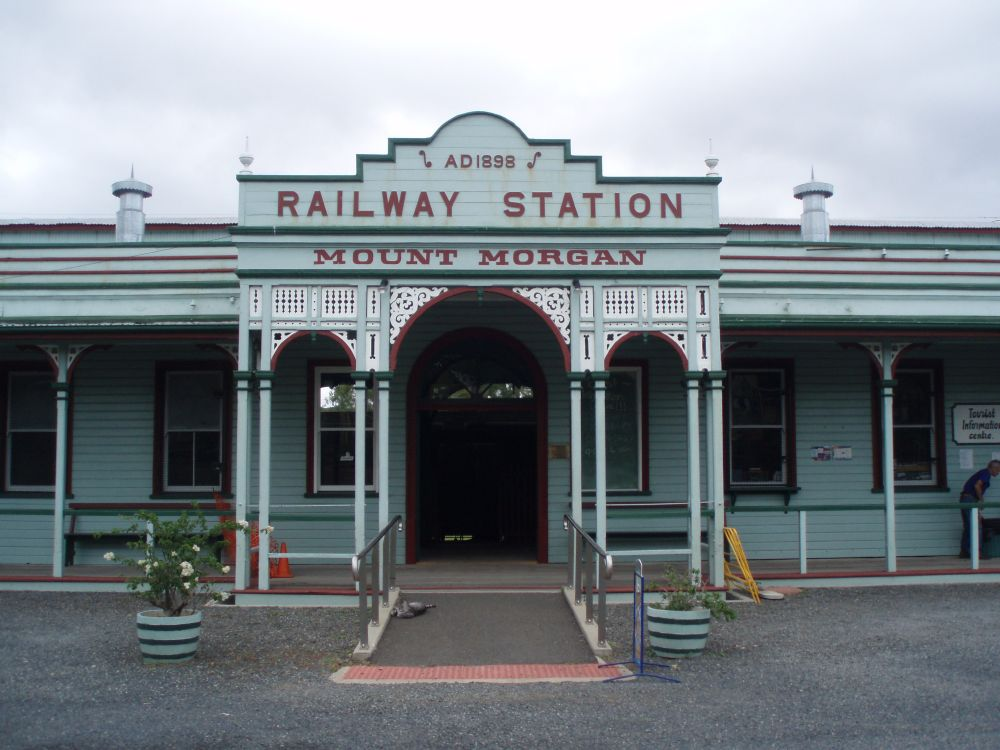
- Mount Morgan railway station

- Location within Queensland
- 23.6386°S 150.3867°E
- Location: Railway Parade, Mount Morgan, Rockhampton Region, Queensland, Australia

History
- Design period: 1870s–1890s (late 19th century)
- Built: 1898–1921

Site notes
- Architect: Henrik Hansen
- Architectural style: Classicism

Queensland Heritage Register
- Official name: Mount Morgan Railway Station Complex
- Type: state heritage (built, landscape)
- Designated: 21 October 1992
- Reference no.: 600752
- Significant period: 1898–1987 (historical); 1898–1920s (fabric)
- Significant components: carriage shade (railway), crane / gantry, railway station, track, furniture/fittings, railway refreshment room/s, railway siding, yard, foyer – entrance, office/s, signal box/signal cabin/switch house/mechanical points (rail), parcels office, tank – water, shed/s, machinery/plant/equipment – transport – rail, toilet block/earth closet/water closet, views to

Mount Morgan railway station is a heritage-listed railway station at Railway Parade, Mount Morgan, Rockhampton Region, Queensland, Australia. It is on the Mount Morgan–Wowan railway line. The station was constructed in 1898 to service the former goldrush and gold mining township of Mount Morgan and its mine. The station was designed by Henrik Hansen, who also designed the Archer Park, Shorncliffe and South Brisbane railway stations. The station operated as a functional railway station from 1898 until 1987, after which it was restored as a Railway Heritage Museum. The museum includes artefacts from the rail and mining history of Mount Morgan, including a restored Hunslett steam engine, "Silver Bullet" rail motor and timber rail carriages. The station was added to the Queensland Heritage Register on 21 October 1992.

== History ==
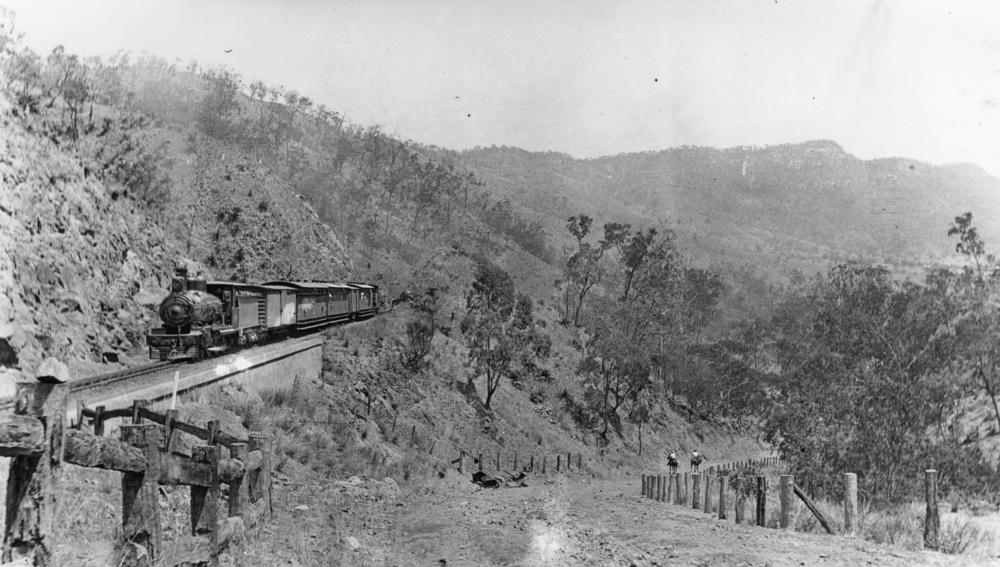
Mount Morgan rack railway, 1913

The Mount Morgan gold mine had been developed in 1883 and by 1889 with a mining population of 5,836 people, Mount Morgan's fortunes had attained their first peak. From 1903 copper was extracted and in 1929 a new company, Mount Morgan Limited, established an open cut to extract the copper ore.

The line linking Mount Morgan with Rockhampton, via Kabra on the Central Western railway line, was opened on 26 November 1898. The line was subsequently extended to Wowan on 16 October 1912. From the opening, a service of three trains daily was provided. which were maintained at Mount Morgan from 1898 to 1952 when a lower gradient deviation was opened.

Due to the steep inclines in the Razorback Ranges, the line included a section of rack railway between Moonmera and the Mount Morgan township. It was built at half the cost of a conventional railway, at a time when the longevity of the ore deposit was unknown, but added significantly to operating costs and time delays on the journey. Special-purpose steam locomotives had to attach to the train for ascent and descent of the rack section. Although only approximately 2.4 kilometres (1.5 mi) long, the rack section speed of approximately 10 kilometres per hour (6.2 mph). The time for the rack loco to attach and detach added 40 minutes or more to the journey compared to a conventional line, and the maximum load was limited to ~130 long tons (130 t). To prevent runaways if wagon couplings broke, the engine was typically coupled at the lower side of the train, when ascending and descending the incline. The steepest grade was 1 in 16.5 (~6%), double the steepest grade on a conventional line and three times steeper than the usual maximum grade. The rack locomotives were maintained at Mount Morgan from 1898 until 1952, when a deviation bypassing the rack railway was opened.

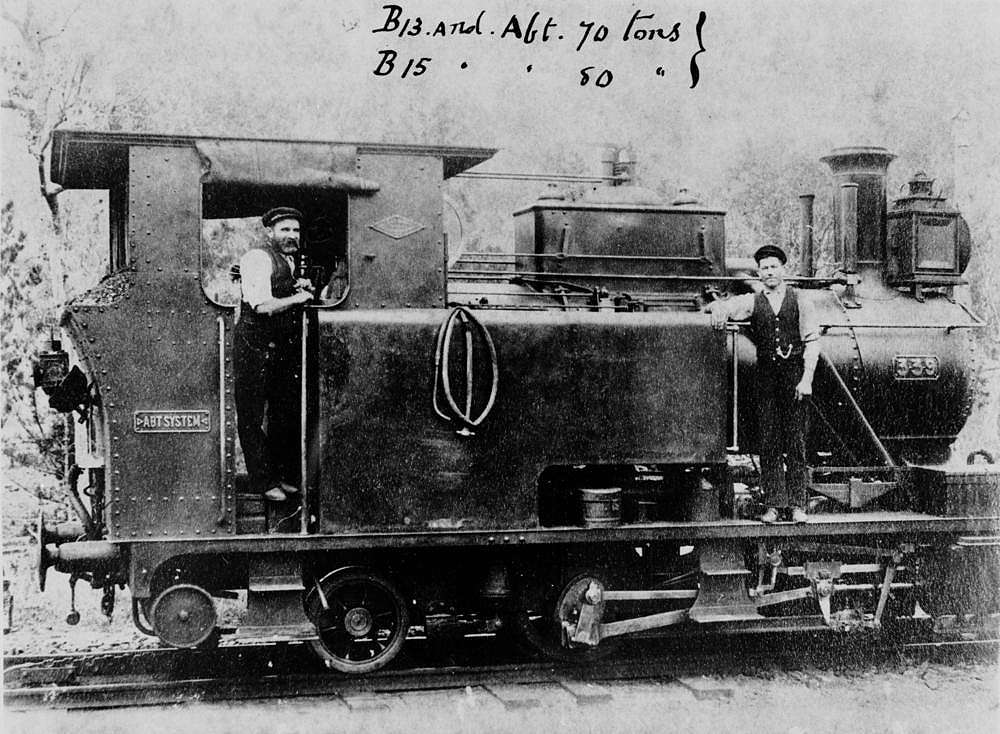
Abt rack locomotive at Mount Morgan, Queensland, 1890-1900

The rack section used the Abt rack railway system, which was developed in Switzerland and was one of three such lines in Australia. The remaining two are the West Coast Wilderness Railway, a former mining line located in Tasmania, rebuilt as a tourist attraction, and Skitube serving the Blue Cow ski resort in New South Wales.

An appropriate station building for an important provincial town was designed by Henrik Hansen, who was responsible for similar stations at Cunnamulla, Winton, Archer Park and Emerald in the same period. The first stage of the station building constructed in 1898.

The locomotive water supply at Mount Morgan failed in 1901. The following year, when water supplies failed completely, the mine and town were kept going by trains hauling water from Stanwell. Twelve trains per day unloaded into the bed of the Dee River from the nearby railway bridge (since made into a road bridge). In 1917–18, the station yard was enlarged. The engine shed moved to a new site to allow more room, and a turning triangle or forkline as installed to replace the turntable. In 1919–20, an elevated coal stage was erected.

A parcels office and station master's office was added at the north end of the station building in 1912. Refreshment rooms followed in 1921, initially opened or taken over as part of the State-enterprises policy. The rooms were closed and re-sited as barrack quarters in 1968.

By 1940, the complex consisted of station building, refreshment rooms, dock road, 20,000 imperial gallons (91,000 L; 24,000 US gal) tank, engine shed, oil store, examiners shed, 40 long tons (41 t) double rail weighbridge, goods shed, office and 10 long tons (10 t) crane with warehouse crane, station masters house, fireman's house, quarters, forkline, small coal stage and trucking yards.

The rack railway was closed in April 1952, after the Razorback Range deviation was opened, with grades of 1 in 50 (2%), able to handle ~750 long tons (760 t) trains, allowing the haulage of Callide coal through Mount Morgan with conventional steam locomotives. The deviation was constructed because the rack locomotives had reached the end of their working lives, but also because the bottleneck that the rack section created meant the development of export coal mines at Callide and Moura would not have been possible. A concrete retaining wall from the rack line remains at the top of the Razorback Ranges on the entry to Mount Morgan. A short section of the rack centre rail has been retained in Morgan Street, Mount Morgan, opposite the town museum. After the rack railway was removed, the Mount Morgan to Rockhampton line operated as a fully adhesion-based railway.

In 1955, a separate room for shunters was provided and the guard's room moved. In 1959, the 10 long tons (10 t) crane (spare) was moved to Innisfail. A 75 long tons (76 t) double rail weighbridge was provided in 1964.

During the 1960s, coal-fired steam engines were gradually replaced by diesel-electric locomotives which were maintained at the Rockhampton railway workshops. Previously, the steam engines had been repaired and maintained at the Mount Morgan locomotive depot. The first diesel-electric locomotive to work through to Mount Morgan arrived on 26 May 1964, and steam locomotive operations via Mount Morgan ceased in October 1967. In 1971, the coal stage was dismantled. With activities at Mount Morgan mine declining to a point where there was little traffic, the retention of the Mount Morgan railway depot became uneconomical and in May 1984, the facility was downgraded to two employees.

On 1 August 1987, the railway from Kabra through Mount Morgan to Wowan closed, following the construction of a direct line from the Moura and Callide mines to the coal loading terminal at Gladstone, allowing trains to handle haul 5,000 metric tons (4,900 long tons; 5,500 short tons) loads. The old line was dismantled in 1989, but the Mount Morgan station building and yard, and a short section of track, were retained for tourism purposes. The Mount Morgan Shire Council was given tenancy in 1988.

== Description ==
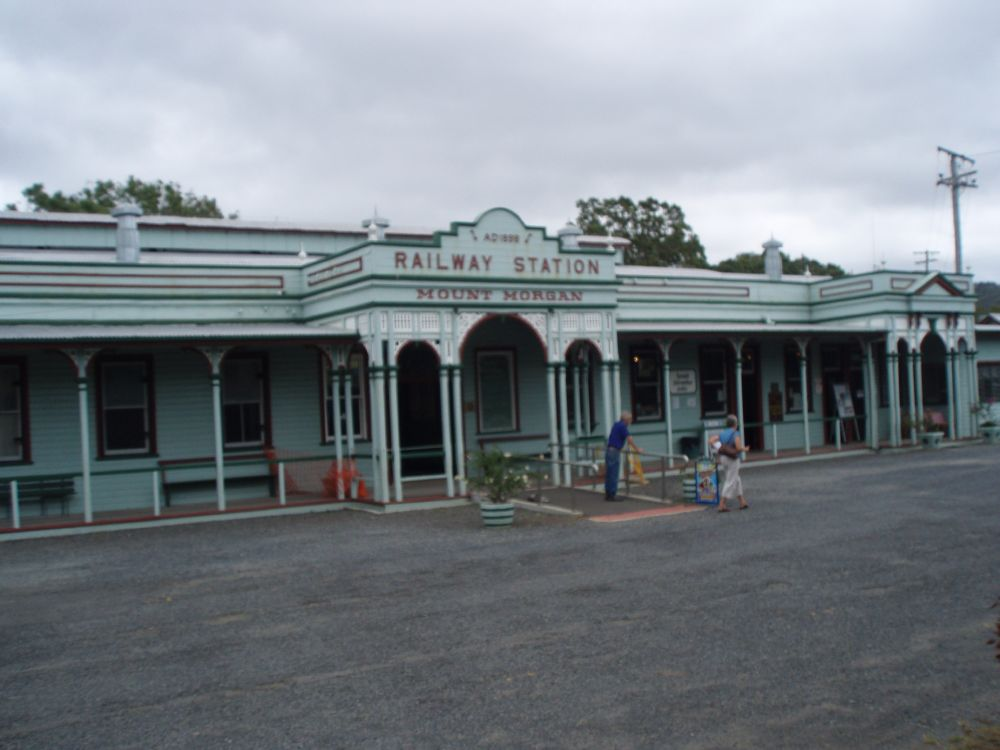
Mount Morgan Railway Station Complex

The Station Building is a Classical Revival Boom Style structure with imposing roadside elevational treatment and 10 bay carriage shade. The roadside elevation has a central arcaded portico carried on grouped cast iron columns with surmounting cast iron lace panels and timber parapet having a curved pediment and "AD 1898 Mount Morgan" on the entablature. Flanking verandahs strengthen the buildings symmetry which is offset by the 1912 additions, having their own portico in the manner of an end pavilion with pedimented treatment enhancing the overall composition. There are minor later additions at both ends and the parapet urns have been removed. Accommodation consists of the vestibule which is enriched on the platform side with fretted timber brackets and spandrels, comparable with Clifton and Toowoomba station buildings. The ladies' room and closets are to the south and offices and parcels office to the north. The carriage shade protects 2 tracks and has standard curved Warren girder trusses supported on timber posts and c.g.i. cladding.

The former Refreshment Rooms, since relocated to an adjoining site as barracks, are a rectangular building, approximately 6 by 10 metres (20 ft × 33 ft) with rear kitchen wing, offset gable roof, later windows and shades. The Shunters/Guards Room, later bike shed and crew room, is a representative building of its period. The Goods Shed is approximately 36 by 108 feet (11 m × 33 m) timber-framed c.g.i. clad structure with internal platform and siding, 4 doors to the sides and a later timber office at the south end. There is an intact rainwater head at the south-west corner. There is a 30-long-hundredweight (3,400 lb) warehouse crane inside the building. The Weighbridge Office is in situ but the weighbridge has been removed. The Signal Cabin has been relocated from Glenmore Junction (North Coast Railway - junction for Yeppoon and Emu Park closed lines). The 20,000-imperial-gallon (91,000 L; 24,000 US gal) Tank is a 2 tier cast iron tank with 2 jibs, manufactured by Walkers Limited Engineers, Maryborough, supported on riveted and bellied iron beams and a timber stand with store.

== Heritage listing ==
Mount Morgan Railway Station Complex was listed on the Queensland Heritage Register on 21 October 1992 having satisfied the following criteria.

The place is important in demonstrating the evolution or pattern of Queensland's history.

Mount Morgan railway station has historic significance as a substantial and imposing complex built to serve a thriving mining township. Of the various comparable places including Charters Towers, Ravenswood and Gympie only Mount Morgan survives with a high level of integrity sufficient to directly demonstrate the optimism of the period. The station building compares closely with the later Archer Park (1899), Emerald (1900) and Longreach (1916), surviving as the earliest example of this important group designed by Henrik Hansen at that time when the noted architect John J. Clark was receiving commissions from Queensland Railways and may have had influence on its design.

The place demonstrates rare, uncommon or endangered aspects of Queensland's cultural heritage.

The water tank is rare, comparing only with Quilpie in that its builder's plate connects it with the noted engineering firm of Walkers Limited of Maryborough. The goods shed is also a rare survivor comparing with Warwick and Wyandra which also retain warehouse cranes.

The place is important in demonstrating the principal characteristics of a particular class of cultural places.

The complex retains the principle elements of a late Victorian station of importance.

The place is important because of its aesthetic significance.

The building has aesthetic qualities valued today by the community.
