= South Maitland Railway Workshops =

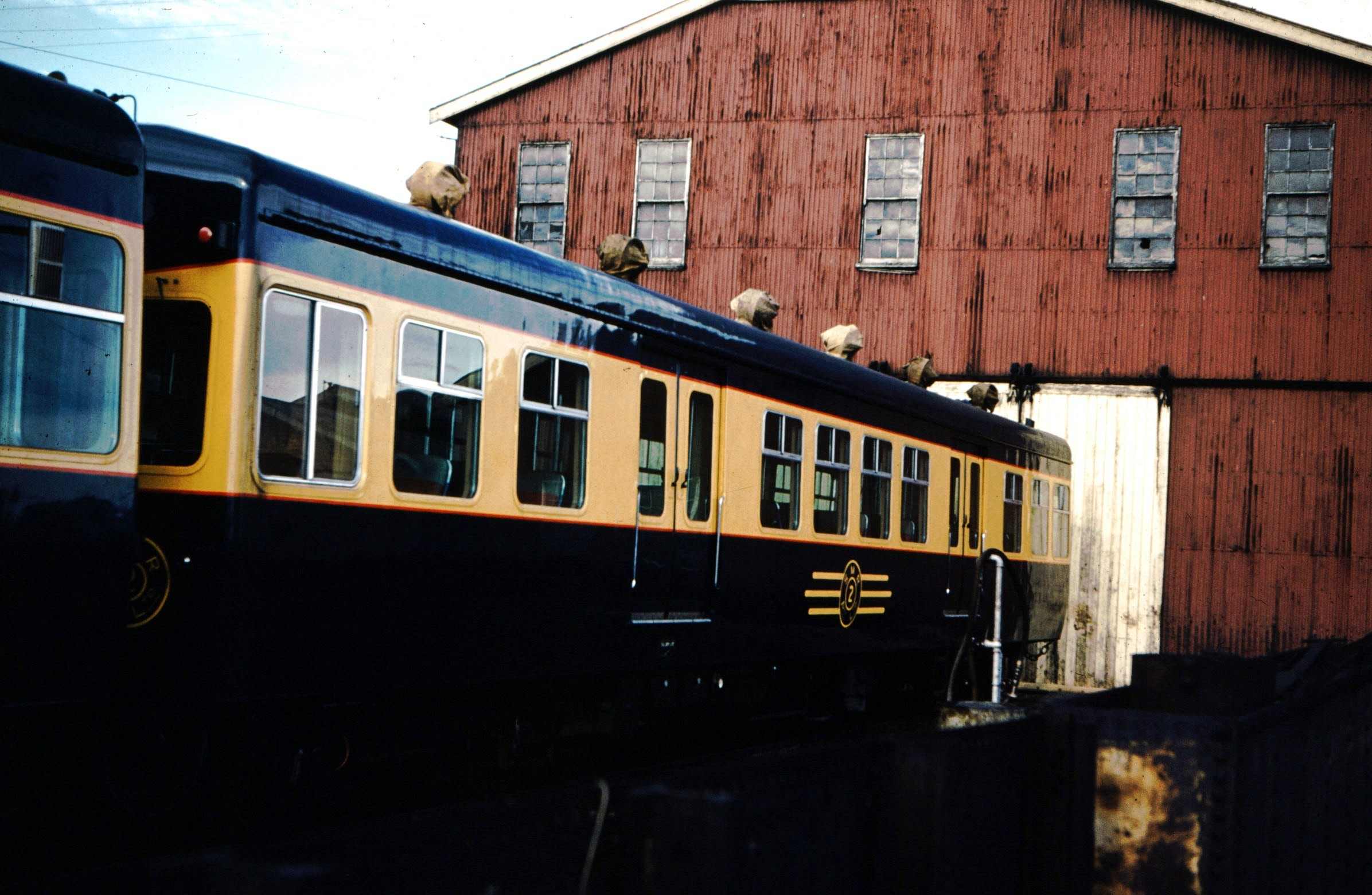
- South Maitland Railway railcar No 2 outside workshops, 1961

- Location within New South Wales Location within Australia
- 32.7391°S 151.5370°E
- Location: Junction Street, Telarah, New South Wales, Australia

New South Wales Heritage Register
- Official name: South Maitland Railway Workshops
- Type: state heritage (complex / group)
- Designated: 2 April 1999
- Reference no.: 627
- Type: Railway Workshop
- Category: Transport – Rail

South Maitland Railway Workshops is a heritage-listed former railway workshops and now museum and industrial site at Junction Street, Telarah, New South Wales, Australia. It was added to the New South Wales State Heritage Register on 2 April 1999.

== History ==
=== 1842–1893: Land grant & pastoral use ===
The subject land was part of an 1842 grant to Thomas Winder, bought in 1884 by Albert Simpson. Exploration for coal in the area around Newcastle was underway in the 1840s. Commercial mining in the Maitland district began at Greta Coalfield in the 1860s, then at East Greta in 1869, with a second mine here in 1898. Other mines were then opened in the vicinity.

=== East Greta Colliery Railway & creation of East Greta Junction ===
The original East Greta Coal Mining Co. was established in 1891. One of its first actions was to build a railway from East Greta No. 1 Colliery to the Great Northern Railway. The railway line between the colliery and the government main line was opened in 1893 and was worked by New South Wales Government Railways. Initially East Greta Junction only consisted of a plain junction with the New South Wales Government Railways' Great Northern Railway. In 1896 after the take over of haulage on the line by the East Greta Coal Mining Co. using their own locomotive East Greta Colliery Sidings were constructed adjacent to the junction with the government main line. These sidings consisted of 4 loop sidings. However the extension of the private railway system meant that these were soon inadequate, and more loop sidings had been constructed by 1903. By 1910 further storage sidings were required and 4 additional separate loop sidings were constructed on the Cessnock side of the Junction Street level crossing. These sidings were known as Mt Dee sidings and were used for the storage of full wagons, the existing sidings become the empty sidings.

In 1901 a branch line from East Greta No.1 Colliery to Stanford Merthyr Colliery was opened. In 1904 a line to Cessnock that branched off the Stanford Merthyr line at Aberdare Junction was opened. Passengers and goods, as well as coal, were transported on the line between Stanford Merthyr and East Greta Junction, in order to connect the colliery communities with Maitland. This service began in 1902, and at first passengers had to make their own way between the junction and West Maitland (later Maitland). In 1903 the service was extended to West Maitland. The South Maitland Railway ceased operating the passenger trains in 1967, and the New South Wales Government Railways ceased operation of trains on the line in 1972.

=== Creation of separate Railway Workshops ===
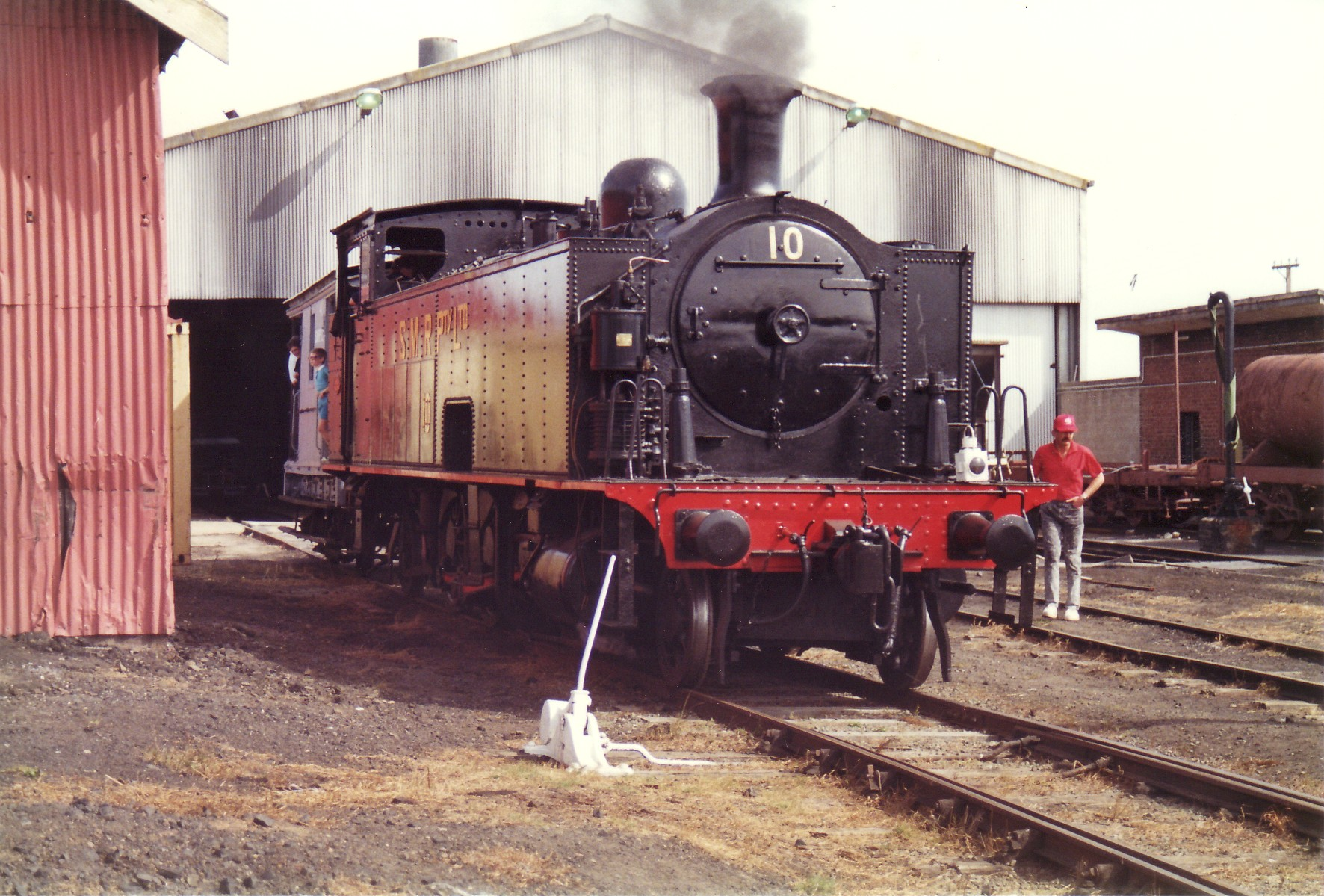
Preserved SMR 10 class No.10 in front of the 1981 vintage loco shed at East Greta Junction, the sand shed is on the left.

Construction of workshops on the site began in about 1904, when a locomotive depot was built by the East Greta Coal Mining Company. This was a two road engine shed, and was replaced in 1912 by a wooden framed twin gable four track galvanised iron shed constructed nearby. In 1981 this was in turn demolished to make way for a modern steel portal framed locomotive shed of slightly shorter length than the original timber shed. The present workshop was constructed some time between 1912 and 1918.

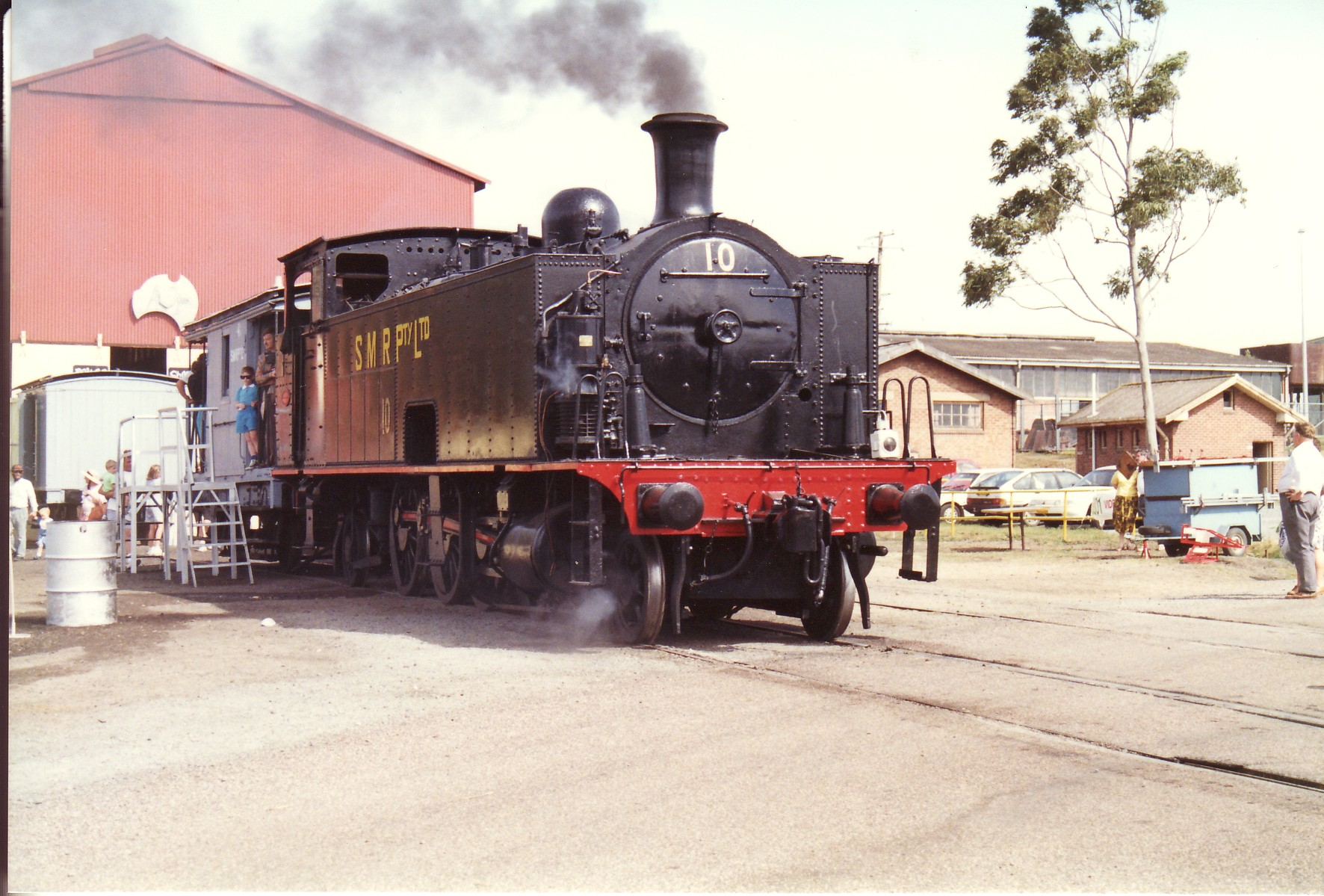
Preserved SMR No.10 on display in front of the main workshop building at East Greta Junction in 1991. The change room, toilet block and machine shop buildings are in the background.

On the site by 1918 were also a sand drying shed, a signing-on cabin and a wooden coaling platform. An elevated coal loader fed via conveyor was built in 1927. Goods sheds from Caledonia and Weston stations were moved to the site in 1930 to serve as an oil store and a lunch room. A brick bath house was built in 1943. In 1957 a toilet block, a machine shop and stores building, and a new signing-on cabin were built. The old battery store was demolished. In 1981 a new sand house and battery shed were built.

The original Mount Dee homestead on top of the hill became offices, and the first new building was the large Erecting & Repair Workshop. As operations expanded in the 1920s most of the infrastructure was established, with brick buildings added in the 1950s and the last replacement steel framed Running Shed built in 1981.

=== Formation of South Maitland Railways Ltd ===
In 1918 the main line railway interests of Hebburn Ltd and the East Greta Coal Mining Co. were merged to form South Maitland Railways Ltd. This new company took over the ownership and operation of the Stanford Merthyr line and the Aberdare Railway, as well as all of the locomotives and passenger and goods rolling stock of the East Greta Coal Mining Co. The new company also took over the haulage over other colliery lines that were previously worked by the East Greta Co. The new company also took over the railway related workshops & facilities at East Greta Junction. After the formation of South Maitland Railways all repair work on the locomotives and rolling stock owned by the company were transferred to East Greta Junction Workshops, previously work had been carried out the East Greta Coal Mining Company's general workshops at East Greta No.1 Colliery.

=== 1967 Ownership change; 1987 closure; 1989+ adaptive reuse for education, heavy industry ===
In April 1931 the East Greta Coal Mining Co. was taken over by J & A Brown & Abermain Seaham Collieries, which gave them a 50% share of SMR. In the 1940s due to changes in company laws South Maitland Railways Ltd was changed to South Maitland Railways Proprietary Limited. With the merger of JABAS with Caledonian Collieries Ltd in 1960 and the formation of Coal & Allied the 50% share in SMR held by JABAS passed to this new company. In 1967 Coal & Allied purchased Hebburn Ltd which then gave them 100% control of South Maitland Railways. The SMR continued as a subsidiary of Coal & Allied until 1989 when SMR Pty Ltd was bought by a private consortium.

Full-time work by South Maitland Railways staff at the workshops ended with the ending of steam haulage on the South Maitland Railway on 10 June 1983. The Workshops remained in limited use maintaining the remaining operational ten class steam locomotives until 1987 when the Coal & Allied owned Richmond Vale Railway closed in September 1987. In 1989 the Hunter Valley Training Company bought the site and reopened the workshops as an apprentice training centre after rehabilitation. By 1990 the subject site was leased to GEC Alstom Australia. The present complex was opened in 1991 and since the site has been used for heavy industry.

In 2015 three workshop buildings were leased to the Maitland Rail Museum for museum use. Discussion is underway over a fourth: the former Blacksmith's Shop being leased by the Maitland Rail Museum also.

== Heritage listing ==
South Maitland Railway Workshops is one of the oldest continually operating railway workshops in Australia, documenting more than 70 years (in 1990) of the history, expansion and development of a steam railway;

The South Maitland Railway complex remains largely intact and its extant layout, structures and fabric demonstrate the operation of a steam railway workshops;

As the largest private railway workshops in NSW, the South Maitland Railway complex symbolises the importance of coal mining and steam powered transportation both locally and nationally .

South Maitland Railway Workshops was listed on the New South Wales State Heritage Register on 2 April 1999.
