= Queensland 6D16 class locomotive =

Class of Australian 4-6-2T (later 4-6-4T) locomotives

Queensland Railways 6D16 class
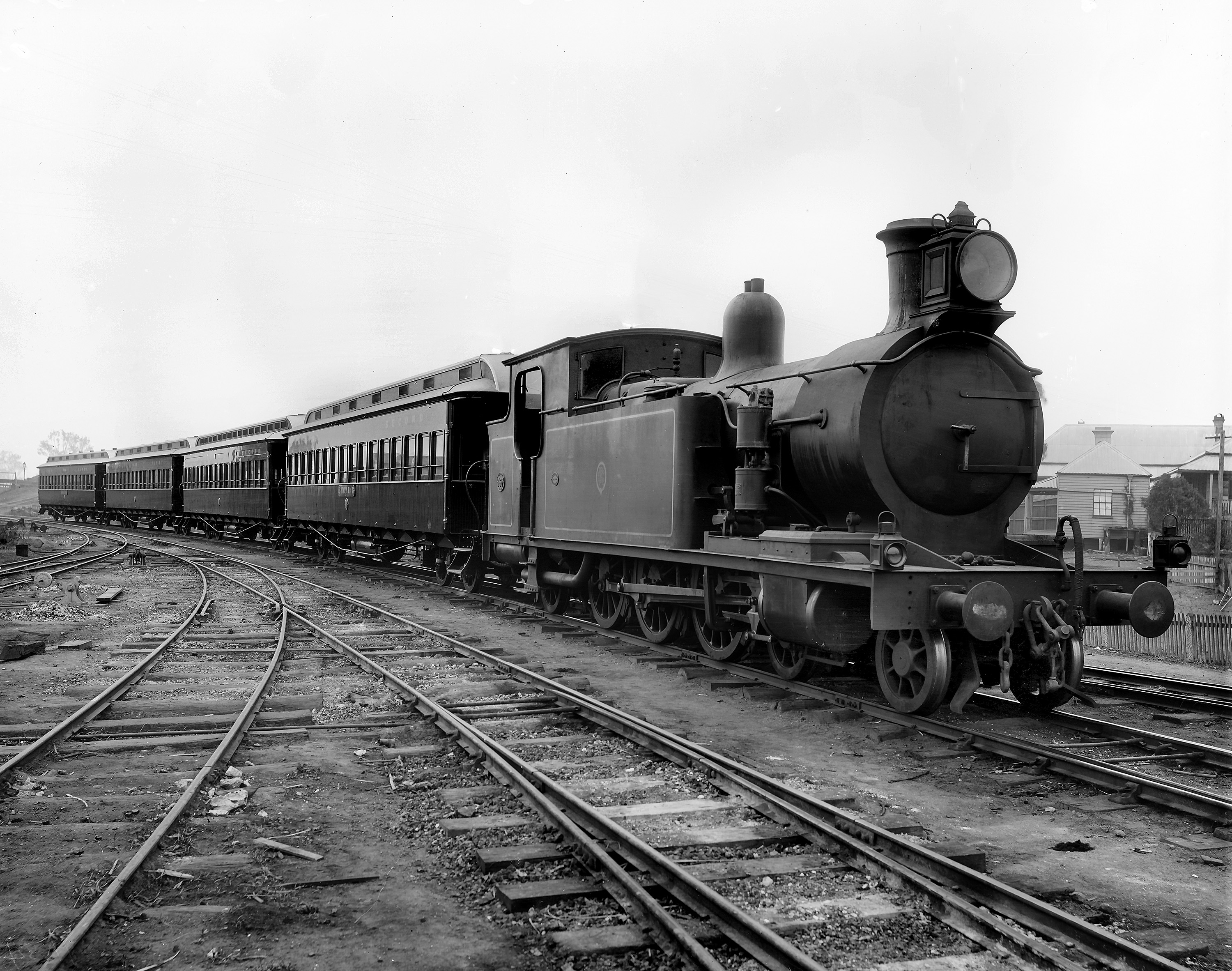
- 6D16 class locomotive No.367 with Passenger Carriages
Type and origin
- Power type: Steam
- Builder: Walkers Limited
- Serial number: 67-86
- Build date: 1901/02
- Total produced: 20
Specifications
- Configuration
  - Whyte: 4-6-2T (as built); 4-6-4T (after rebuild)
- Gauge: 1,067 mm (3 ft 6 in)
- Length: 36 ft 4 in (11.07 m)
- Fuel type: Coal
- Cylinders: 2
Career
- Operators: Queensland Railways
- Numbers: 363-382
- Disposition: all scrapped

The Queensland Railways 6D16 class locomotive was a class of 4-6-2T (later 4-6-4T) steam locomotives operated by the Queensland Railways.

== History ==
Between May 1901 and July 1902, Walkers Limited delivered 20 locomotives to the Queensland Railways. Per Queensland Railway's classification system they were designated the 6D16 class, the 6 representing the number of driving wheels, the D that it was a tank locomotive and the 16 the cylinder diameter in inches. The 6 prefix was later dropped, when the remaining non six-wheel tanks were withdrawn.

They were built to the 4-6-2T wheel arrangement. However the combination of double front bogie and single rear bogie caused derailments and in 1904/05 all were rebuilt with a four-wheel swinging bolster bogie at both the front and rear thus becoming 4-6-4Ts. Between 1912 and 1918, all were fitted with new round top boilers and larger bunkers.

They were mainly used on suburban passenger services in Brisbane, principally between Ipswich and Sandgate although they did operate on occasions to Kingston and Lota.

In July 1935, 375 was married to a tender from a B15 class and reclassified as a B16D class. It was followed by 376 in July 1939. Both were deployed on freight services within Brisbane. Twelve were written off in 1942/43 with the remaining eight following in 1950/51.
