= North Ipswich Railway Workshops =

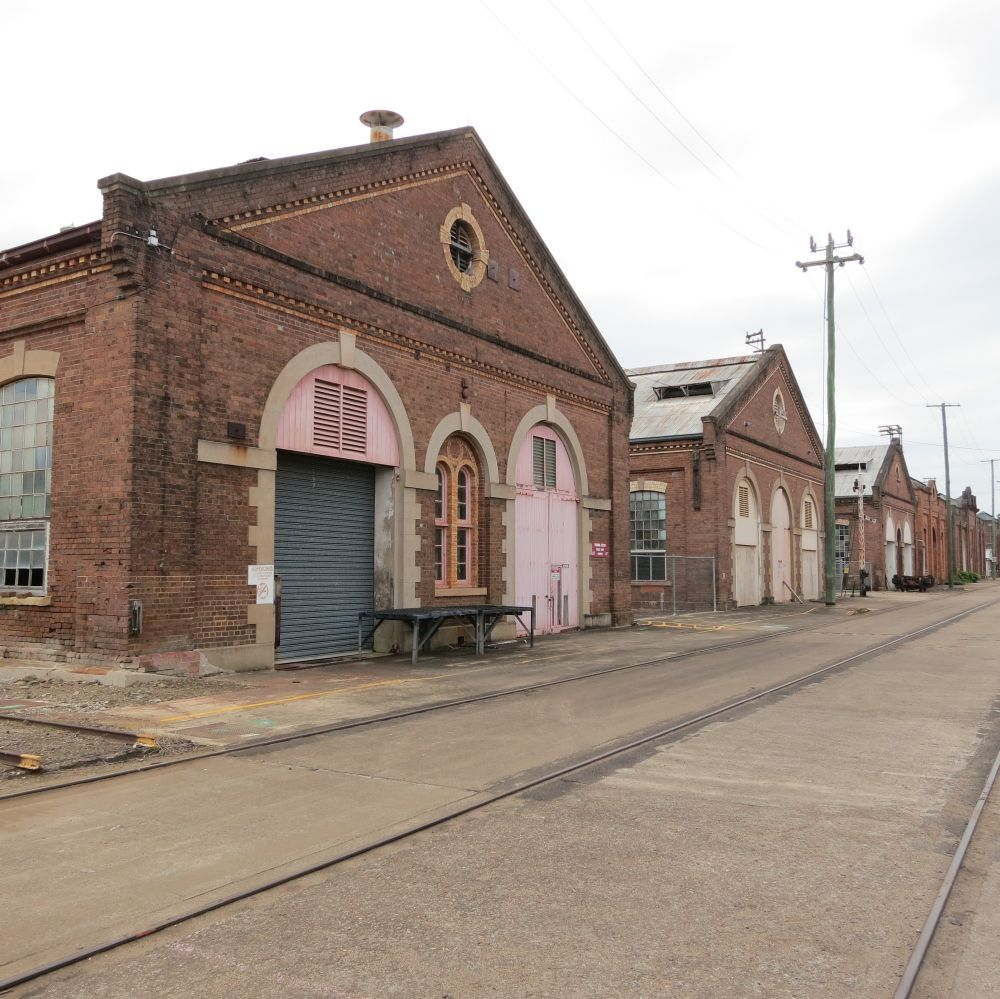
- North Ipswich Railway Workshops, 2016

- Location within Queensland Location within Australia
- 27.6023°S 152.7572°E
- Location: North Street, North Ipswich, Queensland, Australia

History
- Design period: 1840s–1860s (mid-19th century)
- Built: 1878–1980s

Queensland Heritage Register
- Official name: North Ipswich Railway Workshops Complex
- Type: state heritage (built)
- Designated: 21 April 1997
- Reference no.: 601526
- Significant period: 1878–1980s (fabric); 1864–present day (Operation of workshops at site)
- Significant components: furnace, forge/blacksmithy, garden – bed/s, office/administration building, office/s, toilet block/earth closet/water closet, workshop, crane / gantry, tramway, turntable, tank stand, maintenance facility, railway siding, tower, trees/plantings, tower – water, engine/generator shed/room / power supply, traverser, warehouse, railway, pump house, boiler room/boiler house, machinery/plant/equipment – engineering and construction, machinery/plant/equipment – utilities – gas/electricity supply, mill – timber / sawmill, store/s / storeroom / storehouse

North Ipswich Railway Workshops is a heritage-listed current Australian railway workshop at North Street, North Ipswich, Queensland. It was built from 1878 to 1980s. It is also known as the Queensland Museum Rail Workshops. It was added to the Queensland Heritage Register on 21 April 1997.

The original site was built in 1864, then expanded to its current location by 1885 with continued expansion until the 1980s. The front third of the current site is run by Queensland Museums. Behind this Queensland Rail still operate and have continuously operated this site since 1864/1865. It is the oldest continuously operating railway workshop in Australia. (Any information found saying it has closed at any stage is incorrect.) As well as steam locomotives and heritage coaches, other works are still completed here by various tradespersons for Queensland Rail from across the business as a whole.

== History ==
Unlike other colonies, the first railway in Queensland started from a provincial town, Ipswich, instead of from the capital city, Brisbane. The rationale was that transport between Brisbane and Ipswich was already adequately serviced by the Brisbane River, and the most urgent need was to improve transport between Ipswich and the productive Darling Downs region.

The construction contract was awarded to British contractor Peto, Brassey and Betts. Work started in early 1864 and the first section of line was opened in 1865, gradually extending to the Darling Downs and eventually further west. The line between Ipswich and Brisbane was completed in 1875. The first workshops were also built in Ipswich on the southern end of the present site. Construction materials ordered from Britain arrived by ship in Brisbane, then were brought to Ipswich by paddle steamer.

The early workshop buildings included two pre-fabricated "erecting shops" which had been sent out from England; they had cast iron frames with wrought iron roof trusses and were clad with corrugated zinc. These buildings no longer exist.

A number of other buildings were then constructed by local contractors. In 1878–79, the Railway Store Building was erected by Ipswich contractors McGregor and Brown; this is the only building on the southern part of the site which is still standing and it is now used as the Railway Historical Centre (R1). The last of the other early buildings was demolished in 1910. Some components such as roof trusses appear to have been re-used, for example in the Westinghouse Brake and Spray Paint Shed (R48).

The North Ipswich Railway Workshops were initially required to carry out assembly and maintenance only, as the first locomotives used in Queensland were imported from Britain. In 1865, the North Ipswich Railway Workshops built its first item of rolling stock, an engine truck. Ten wagons were built in 1866. The Workshops advanced rapidly and in 1877, built its first locomotive, an A10 class constructed mainly from existing spare parts. The workshops would eventually build 218 steam locomotives, the last a DD17 class in 1952.

Although the Railway Workshops were at North Ipswich, Ipswich station was in the centre of the town, on the southern side of the river. The line from the station passed over a combined rail/road bridge across the Bremer River. It then passed through the Workshops site, continued beside the river, crossed Mihi Creek and Ironpot Creek and then passed through Wulkuraka en route to Grandchester and eventually the Darling Downs. The section of line within the Workshops still exists, although the original materials appear to have been replaced.

As activity at the Workshops increased, the site became cramped, providing no room for further expansion. Additional land was obtained adjacent and to the north of the original site.

Six substantial buildings [the Carriage (R.2), Wagon (R.4), Painting, Fitting and Machine Shops (R.3) and the Smithy (R.5)] plus some smaller timber sheds were completed in the 1880s but the construction program then stopped. Although only a few of the planned buildings were completed, they were arranged in a formal row and this set the basic future layout of the workshops. Financial restrictions and uneasiness about the site after the severe flooding of 1893 seem to have delayed further construction.

Work continued in the workshop buildings at both ends of the sites. This was inconvenient and the buildings were still not adequate for the volume of work. After two accidents in the late 1890s, a Court of Inquiry was held and recommended that the workshops should be "enlarged, extended and equipped with most modern tools and appliances."

William Nisbet, formerly General Manager of the Westinghouse Brake Company of Australia, was appointed to handle the expansion.

Up to this time, the buildings constructed had been relatively small; they were rather narrow and were to a great extent general purpose buildings. The existing workshops staff recognised the problems that existed and were planning for modern equipment (e.g. they had already considered use of a traverser) but they were still thinking on a small scale. Nisbet, with his wider experience, seems to have had the vision to plan for future growth with buildings that were larger, capable of being equipped with larger equipment such as huge overhead cranes and capable of a more efficient work-flow.

The major decision in modernisation was to use electricity, so a power house (R.10) was a key new building. To improve the layout of buildings, a traverser was installed to move equipment between sheds.

Other major construction during the 1900 expansion period include the huge Boiler Shop, (R.14), Carriage and Wagon Shop (R.12) and Machine and Erecting Shop (R.13)on the southern side of the traverser, and a new Smithy (R.7), Store (R.6), Foundry (R.8), Forge and Pattern Shop (R.9) on the northern side. Buildings such as the Blacksmiths Shop (R.7) and the Foundry (R.8) were about three times bigger than the earlier buildings. Some of the construction work was done by contract but some was also done by day labour with up to 360 men employed, the average being 100.

After the major building program of the 1900s, some building work continued, mostly timber buildings for ancillary purposes rather than major new shops. The most prominent visually was the Time-keepers Office (R.17) at the front gates in North Street. Drafting and administrative offices (R.24) were built and a dining room (R.16)was set up for employees. To make the workshops more self-sufficient, the output of the sawmill was expanded so sawn timber did not have to be purchased.

During World War I, about 300 of the 1,600 employees were engaged in production of munitions, particularly shell casings made using BHP steel.

Two other events in this period gave prominence to the workshops. In April 1918, an experimental smelting of iron ore from Biggenden was carried out using the moulders furnaces.

In December 1919, the Vickers Vimy aircraft of Ross and Keith Smith broke down near Charleville after completing the first flight from England to Australia by an Australian crew. North Ipswich Railway Workshops repaired the engine. New connecting rods were forged and machined and the crankcase, damaged when the rods broke, was repaired. A new propeller was also made from Queensland maple.

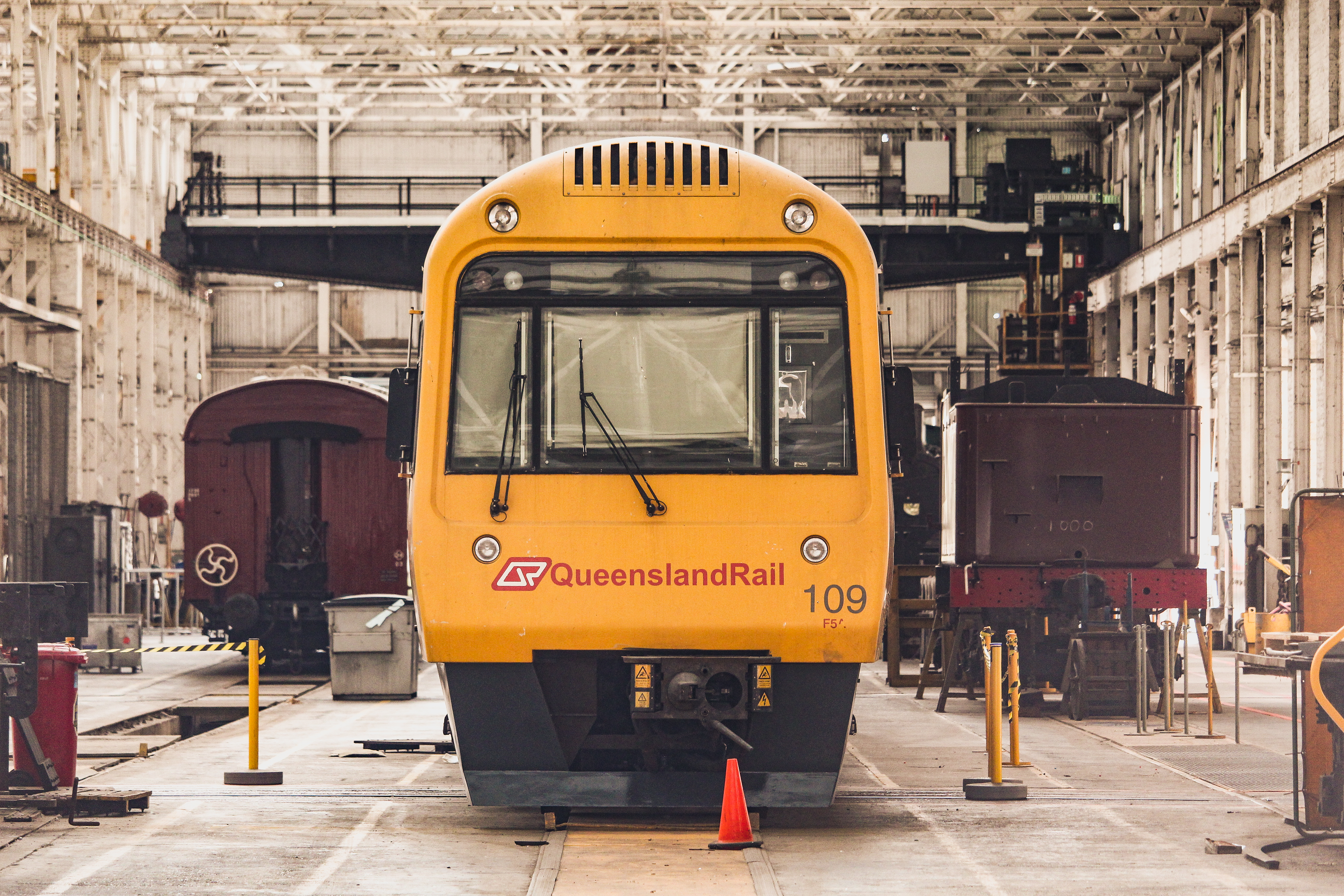
Despite its heritage status, Ipswich Workshops is still used to maintain modern Queensland Rail such as this Interurban Multiple Unit 100 Series.

When World War II began in 1939, the workshops were again involved in wartime production. A 30-ton casting, the largest ever made at the workshops, was produced in 1942.

In 1941, the Australian Government set up a munitions factory at Rocklea. Tools for accurate mass-production were required for the factory and the Australian Government entered into a joint arrangement with the Queensland Government to build a new Tool and Gauge Shop (R.19 & R.20) at North Ipswich Railway Workshops. Acting Prime Minister John Curtin stated that the Railway Workshops was chosen rather than a site near the Rocklea factory because the long-term benefits to Queensland would be greater. He said that Queensland had little industry involving mass-production because of the high initial cost of "tooling-up" and he hoped that the new shop would act as a catalyst for post-war industry. In 1944, an X-ray plant was commissioned for the Boiler Shop to detect flaws in casting and welding.

During World War II, very little new construction could be carried out at North Ipswich Railway Workshops and in the immediate post-war period, Queensland was faced with ageing stock and little immediate capacity for new production. An inquiry recommended that new workshops should be built in the Rockhampton and Townsville areas, and that a new workshop should be built in south-eastern Queensland for locomotive construction and repair, leaving North Ipswich Workshops to cater for carriages and wagons. It was also decided that future rolling stock would be steel where ever possible, a decision which reduced the need for large sawmills at the North Ipswich Railway Workshops.

At this time, land was available in the Ipswich suburb of Redbank, where a huge army camp had recently been de-commissioned. The Redbank Railway Workshops eventually opened in 1958. Although it was originally intended for steam locomotive production and repair, its construction coincided with the change to diesel and it became the centre for diesel locomotives. In 1965, the Foundry and Pattern Shops were transferred from Ipswich to Redbank.

New buildings constructed at the North Ipswich Railway Workshops since 1950 include an Apprentice Training Centre built in 1955; a new sawmill commissioned in 1968; a Plan Printing building completed in 1979; a new training centre built in 1990.

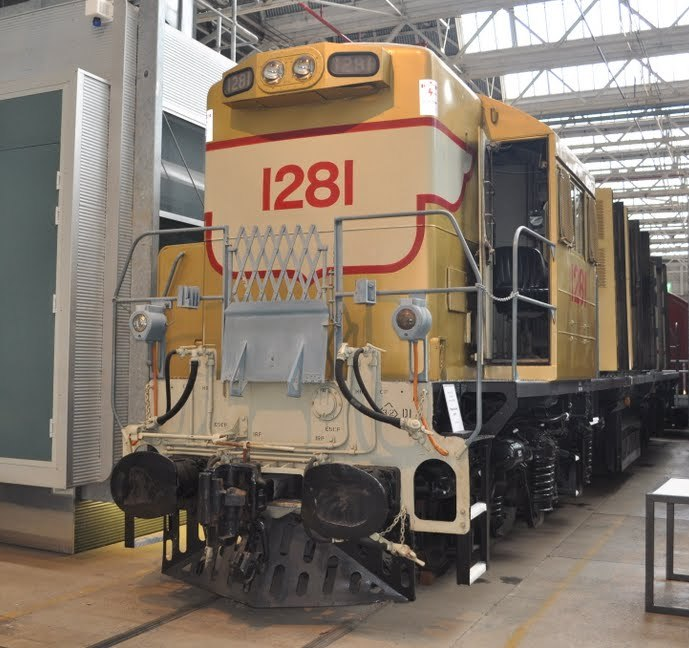
1281 on display at Queensland Museum Rail Workshops in October 2011

== Architecture ==
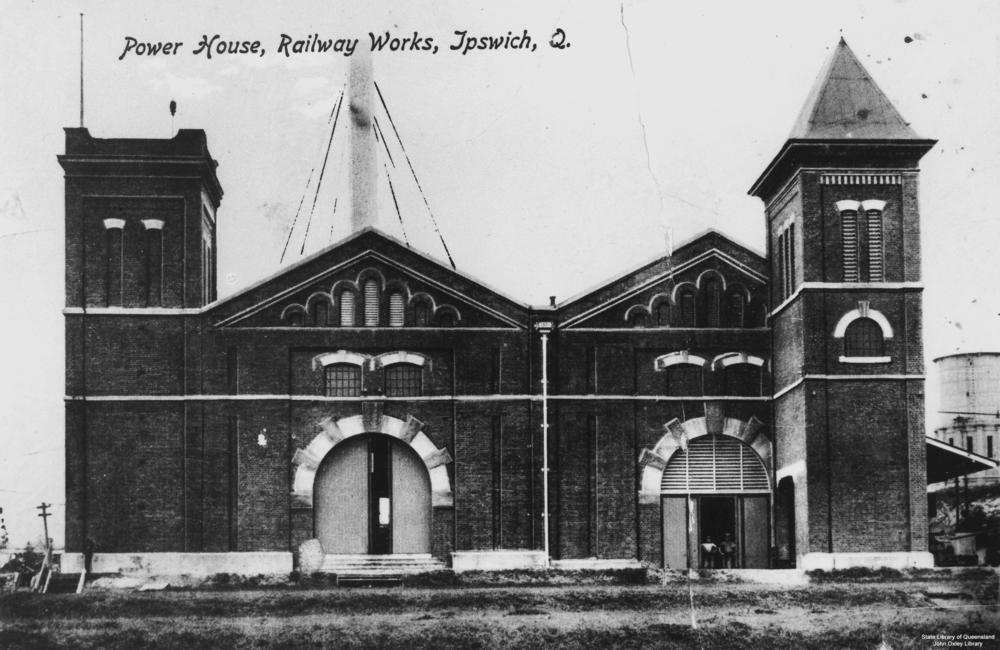
Power House at the North Ipswich Railway Workshops, circa 1914

The North Ipswich Railway Workshops is a place which contains an extensive complex of buildings and linking rail tracks constructed between 1878 and the present day.

A considerable number of these have architectural merit those constructed between 1884 and 1905 were a result of the first major expansion to the northern end of the site in the 1880s and further development resulting from criticisms levelled by an 1899 Inquiry into two boiler accidents.

These buildings include the gable ended brick structures to the north of the Traverser, which although simple and robust industrial buildings, are carefully articulated and detailed in the late Victorian style with bold use of brickwork in projecting plinths, pilasters, corbels, dentil courses and string courses. Some buildings such as the Bogie Repair Shop and Blacksmiths' Shop feature the restrained use of coloured brickwork.

The large main entrance doorways are round arch openings symmetrically placed in gable ends and often flanking a smaller central window. Long side window and door openings are generally of the segmental arch headed type with multi-pane windows in carefully detailed cast iron frames, astragals, and pivoting sections. Door and window dressings are a combination of Helidon freestone, brickwork, or cement render usually with restrained use of coloured brick or stone voussoirs and keystones, raking arches and label moulds.

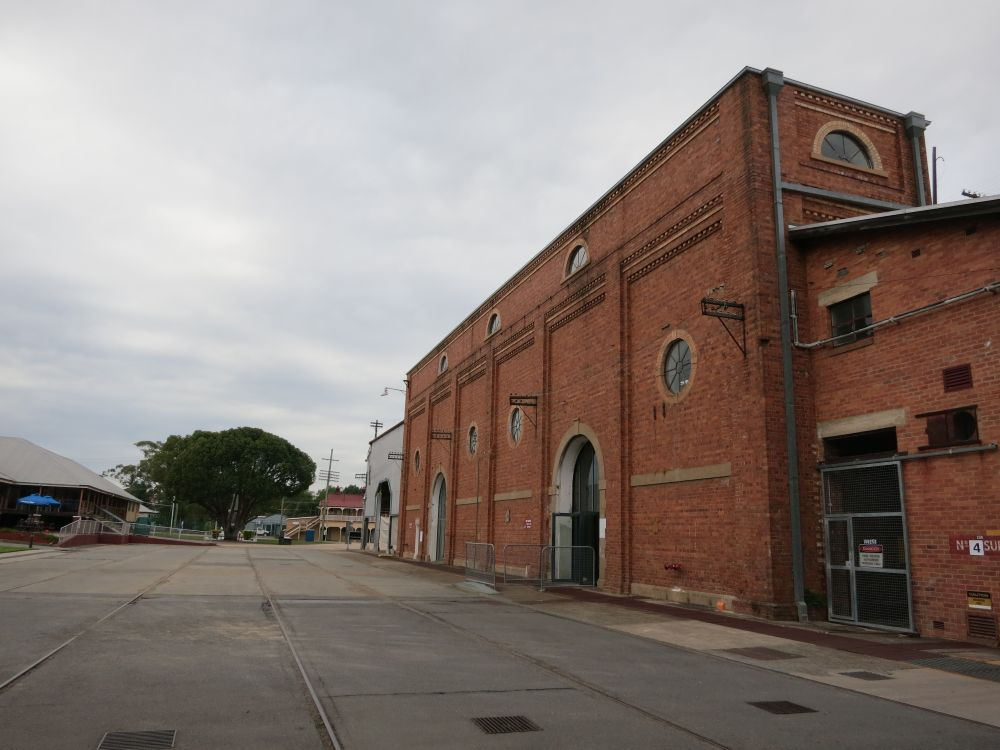
Boiler shop, 2016

In the early years of the twentieth century, finely detailed industrial brick structures such as the Power House, Erecting and Boiler Shops were constructed, completing the intended lateral expansion along the northern and southern sides of the Traverser. These buildings continued the style of the 1880s buildings, some with affinities to Romanesque detail. The final result, when viewed along the strong central axis of the Traverser, is a streetscape of robust brick industrial buildings. Each facade exhibits subtle variations on a simple architectural theme, and the roof lines vary from simple pitched roofs to extensive saw tooth profiles.

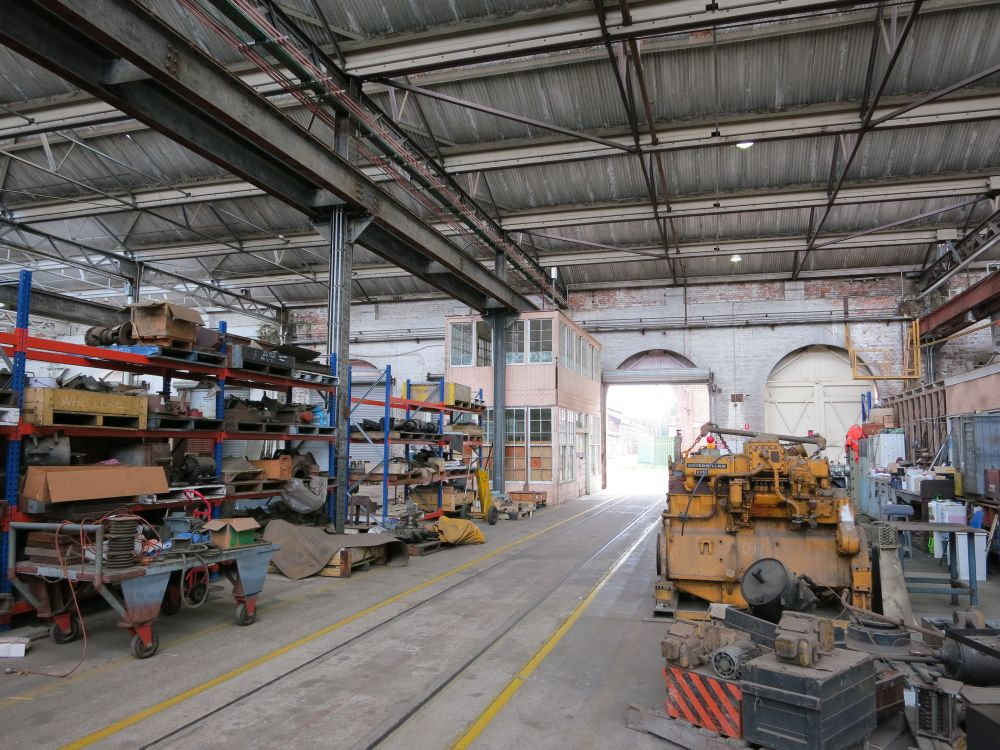
Carriage and wagon shop, 2016

The timber buildings from the 1910–1920 period, such as the Dining Rooms and Chief Mechanical Engineer's Office are of the simple Federation Bungalow type. The Timekeeper's Office at the entry to the Workshops is a two-storey timber structure with outsized roof ventilators, which makes a self- conscious architectural statement.

The Tool and Gauge Shop and Metrology Laboratory built in the 1930s and 40s are geometric structures of the Functionalist style, with plain facebrick walls, and louvre windows with metal frame set in walls with horizontal parapets.

A number of major extensions were made to the original buildings fronting the Traverser, between the years 1910 and 1950. These were simple industrial structures with a steel frame and corrugated galvanised iron cladding. These buildings were built with function and price rather than style as the primary criteria. They are essentially the same as numerous other industrial buildings and railway workshop buildings such as Rockhampton, Launceston, South Maitland and Eveleigh (Sydney).

A great many modest out-buildings and single storey ancillary structures such as amenities blocks, toilets, storage sheds, electric sub-stations and lean-to buildings have been constructed, demolished, up-graded or rebuilt over many decades. While these are important in their contribution towards understanding how the railyards functioned, they are generally unimportant examples of architecture, and in some instances are an intrusive element to the intrinsic architectural quality of the building. In most cases these small ancillary buildings form an interesting contrast both in scale and construction type to the substantial workshops adjacent.

The large elevated water tower to the north of the site is of particular architectural merit. Its large cylindrical water storage tank surrounds a two storeyed rendered brick tower with projecting pilasters and string courses.

At the southern end of the workshops site, and fronting The Terrace, is the old workshops administration building. Constructed in 1878–79, this was the store for the first North Ipswich Railways Workshops. This large two storeyed brick building is a good example of a Victorian era brick and stone warehouse.

The extensive use of cast iron windows throughout the workshops is similar to other railway workshops such as Eveleigh Railway Workshops at Redfern and in other railway buildings in New South Wales e.g. the PerWay Store at Honeysuckle Point and the Blacksmith's Shop at Bathurst.

The site contains groups of mature trees as well as modest gardens with shrubs and fruit trees planted by workmen near their workshops and used as lunch areas. Some of these areas became quite elaborate with recycled seating and garden edges.

== Heritage listing ==
North Ipswich Railway Workshops Complex was listed on the Queensland Heritage Register on 21 April 1997 having satisfied the following criteria.

The place is important in demonstrating the evolution or pattern of Queensland's history.

The North Ipswich Railway Workshops, established in 1864 were the first railway workshops in Queensland. They were an essential adjunct to Queensland's first railway which was constructed from Ipswich to the Darling Downs. The first section of this line, from Ipswich to Grandchester (originally called Bigge's Camp) opened in 1865.

The workshops survive as evidence of the development of transport in Queensland. The early governments of Queensland placed importance on providing reliable transport from the coastal cities to the productive interior regions and it was one of the motivating factors in the 1859 separation of Queensland from New South Wales.

Although their initial role was to assemble and maintain equipment and rolling stock imported from Britain, the workshops later began to construct locomotives, wagons and carriages, demonstrating the pattern of increasing self-sufficiency and increasing sophistication of Queensland industry and technology.

The workshop buildings are important elements in the context of the development of Queensland's principal railway workshops and in the processes of manufacturing and repair of locomotives, wagons and carriages. In April 1918, the first Queensland trial smelting of iron ore was carried out in the furnaces of the Bogie and Brake Shop. Timber patterns are still stored in the loft of this Maintenance Carpenters' Shop, some of which relate to steam engines. The Power House (R10) was part of the grand vision conceived by Chief Mechanical Engineer, William Nisbet, who, with his extensive railways experience overseas, influenced the major planning decisions at the Ipswich Railway Workshops at the turn of the century.

The Tool and Gauge Shop (R18, R19 & R20) is significant for production of the necessary tools used in the manufacture of munitions during World War II. It is thought to be one of only two buildings constructed in Australia at that time specifically for that purpose. It demonstrates the desire of both Queensland and Australian Governments at that time to revolutionise its approach to the development of secondary industry.

The Traverser and Traverser Track (R30) illustrate the distinctive planning geometry which formed the model for late 19th century railway designers and engineers in many parts of the world. The fundamental concept was of parallel rail tracks leading into rows of fairly equally-spaced workshop buildings which in some cases intersected a transverse distribution axis known as a traverser.

The Mihi Line (R53) is significant as part of the first railway line in Queensland. Its original centre-line was marked out by a surveyor in 1996, using the original survey plan dated 29 December 1863.

The place demonstrates rare, uncommon or endangered aspects of Queensland's cultural heritage.

In the nineteenth century, most capital cities in Australia, and some major provincial centres provided locations for railway workshops. The workshops at North Ipswich were on a very large scale and the only equivalent sites were Eveleigh in Sydney and Newport in Melbourne, both of which have closed. The Fibreglass Shed (R41) is a significant surviving structure from saw mill complex which has largely been demolished and which was an important part of the operations of the Workshops.

The place has potential to yield information that will contribute to an understanding of Queensland's history.

Substantial evidence of industrial work practices dating to last century survives including a range of machinery either still in daily use or in use until very recently. The building types are illustrative of changes of technology and workplace amenity over more than a century and the site has the potential to yield more information.

The Blacksmith Shop (R7) contains a wide range of historically significant plant. The layout of the Blacksmith Shop (R7) provides information on the nature of the tasks undertaken and also on the interaction of those tasks. Internally the Wagon and Carriage Shop (R12) contains evidence of earlier work practice such as the two storey Foreman's Office, and technological innovation such as the early Grinnell Sprinkler System. The Erecting and Machine Shop (R13) is a fine example of a Federation warehouse and is of particular architectural merit. The Boiler Shop and Metal Fabrication (R14) contains some early machinery which is significant in demonstrating the techniques of heavy steel fabrication and boiler-making throughout the whole of this century.

The place is important in demonstrating the principal characteristics of a particular class of cultural places.

The North Ipswich Railway Workshops illustrate the distinctive planning geometry which formed the model for late 19th century railway designers and engineers in many parts of the world. The fundamental concept was of parallel rail tracks leading into rows of fairly equally-spaced workshop buildings which in some cases intersected a transverse distribution axis known as a traverser. Construction of new buildings has continued into the 1980s and the site demonstrates the evolution from architecturally articulated brick and masonry buildings to metal-clad or cement-block buildings.

Many of the buildings are of particular architectural merit. Fine examples of late Victorian brick warehouses are:

- the Trimmers and Electroplaters Shop (R2)
- the Tarpaulin store (R3) (south) and K Mill (R3) (north)
- the Wheel Shop (R4)
- the Spring Shop (R5).

Fine examples of Federation era warehouses are:

- the Supply Warehouse (R6)
- the Blacksmith Shop (R7)
- the Bogie and Brake Shop (R8)
- the Maintenance Carpenters' Shop (R9)
- the Wagon and Carriage Shop (R12)
- the Boiler Shop and Metal Fabrication (R14).

The Power House (R10) is a fine example of the Federation Romanesque style of architecture.

The Traverser (R30) is significant as an operational piece of equipment dating from 1902 and the Track is an important component of site geometry.

The Fibreglass Shed (R41) is a significant surviving structure from saw mill complex which has largely been demolished and which was an important part of the operations of the Workshops.

The place is important because of its aesthetic significance.

The Traverser and Traverser Track (R30) are elements which are peculiar to railyards planning have given North Ipswich Railway Workshops a particular aesthetic quality. The streetscape of the many buildings fronting the traverser is the combined result of this formal railyards planning, and the desire of the Queensland Railways Department at the turn of the century to create substantial brick and masonry industrial buildings of architectural merit.

The Timekeeper's Office (R17) is a domestic scale timber building . Its design and detailing makes an important architectural statement at the entrance to the Workshops.

The water tower (R28) is a fine example of a utilitarian structure designed using classically derived motifs. The water tower (R28) and tank stand (R29) are a landmark on the site.

The place is important in demonstrating a high degree of creative or technical achievement at a particular period.

The North Ipswich Railway Workshops contain evidence of a high degree of technological achievement which is demonstrated by surviving fabric and items of machinery.

The Power House constructed in 1901–02 supplied electricity to the whole railyards complex some 16 years before power was supplied to Ipswich by the Ipswich Electric Light Co. The Power House retains abundant evidence of coal fuel bunkers, ash removal system, electrical equipment, and the giant accumulator which supplied water under pressure to the riveters and flanging presses of the Boiler House.

The Tool and Gauge Shop, constructed during the Second World War to produce tools used in munitions manufacture was the only facility of its type in Queensland at that time. It resulted from a clear Government decision for Queensland to develop the best technological practices, and the North Ipswich Railway Workshops were selected as a suitable location.

Other examples of technological achievement are demonstrated by the early Grinnell Fire Sprinkler System, the 1944 X-Ray building at the Boiler House, the tramway turntables at the K. Mill, and the Tensile Testing Machine at the Laboratory. At various times the workshops were reputed to have machinery which was the most advanced in Australia. The workshops have a capacity for further research which may well yield information of industrial archaeological value.

The North Ipswich Railway Workshops also contain items of historical plant in working order such as overhead cranes, a Traverser and power hammers dating to early this century.

The Power House (R10) was a major technological achievement of its time, and considerable evidence survives within it to enable an understanding of how it functioned. In particular it still contains historic machinery and equipment, such as the 1901 overhead travelling gantry cranes, the hydraulic accumulator, and a steam driven hydraulic pump.

Internally, the Erecting and Machine Shop (R13) contains fine examples of early twentieth century heavy engineering practice such as the support structures for overhead travelling gantry cranes, and the cranes themselves.

The Tool and Gauge Shop (R18, R19, and R20) is significant for production of the necessary tools used in the manufacture of munitions during World War II. It is thought to be one of only two buildings constructed in Australia at that time specifically for that purpose.

The cast iron pump house (R52) is significant as an unusual example of a special-purpose structure built by a local manufacturer.

The place has a strong or special association with a particular community or cultural group for social, cultural or spiritual reasons.

The workshops have a strong association for the people of Ipswich with the development of their community. For most of its 130 years, the North Ipswich Railway Workshops have employed more than 1,500 people at any one time, with a maximum of more than 3,000 just after the Second World War. As one of the largest places of employment in Ipswich, the workshops had a continuing and major impact on the lifestyles of thousands of families who resided in the city. As a result of its inner city location, the daily routine of workshops life was noticeable to people in other walks of life. Ipswich people took pride in the achievements of the workshops, as evidenced by numerous newspaper articles and features in commemorative magazines over a very long period of time. In particular the workshops have a strong association for former employees.

The workshops also created a community within itself, together with its own workplace culture. At various times the workshops community had its own co-operative ventures and interacted with the outside community through its own sporting and service clubs. Workmen took pride in their workplace and created their own gardens and outdoor lunch areas, personalising their industrial environment.

The Power House (R10) is an icon of the Ipswich Railway Workshops and a landmark of Ipswich.

The place has a special association with the life or work of a particular person, group or organisation of importance in Queensland's history.

The North Ipswich Railway Workshops are significant for their strong association with the important early figures in Queensland's railway history in including Henry Horniblow.

The buildings on the site are part of a tradition of railway architecture and design in Queensland, and are significant for their association with the work of several important architects, engineers and railway planners including Henry Stanley, Henry Plew, William Pagan, Henrick Hansen, William Nisbet, Francis Jones, Vincent Price and Charles Da Costa.

In the Bogie and Brake Shop (R8), the old timber lockers with random messages and chalked notices are evidence of the strong association with former employees.

The Power House (R10) was part of the grand vision conceived by Chief Mechanical Engineer, William Nisbet, who, with his extensive railways experience overseas, influenced the major planning decisions at the Ipswich Railway Workshops at the turn of the century.

The Timekeeper's Office (R17) is the only official entry and exit point for the workshops and was purpose designed with the intention of controlling the large numbers of employees changing their shift at any one time. The building has a strong association with the employees of the workshops.

The Tool and Gauge Shop (R18, R19, and R20) demonstrates the desire of both Queensland and Australian Governments at that time to revolutionise its approach to the development of secondary industry.

== Notable people ==
- Patrick Real, carpenter at the workshops and later Supreme Court judge

== See also ==
- Ipswich Railway Workshops War Memorial, a heritage-listed war memorial on the grounds of the workshops
- Queensland Museum Rail Workshops
