= EMD G22C Series =

Class of American export diesel locomotives

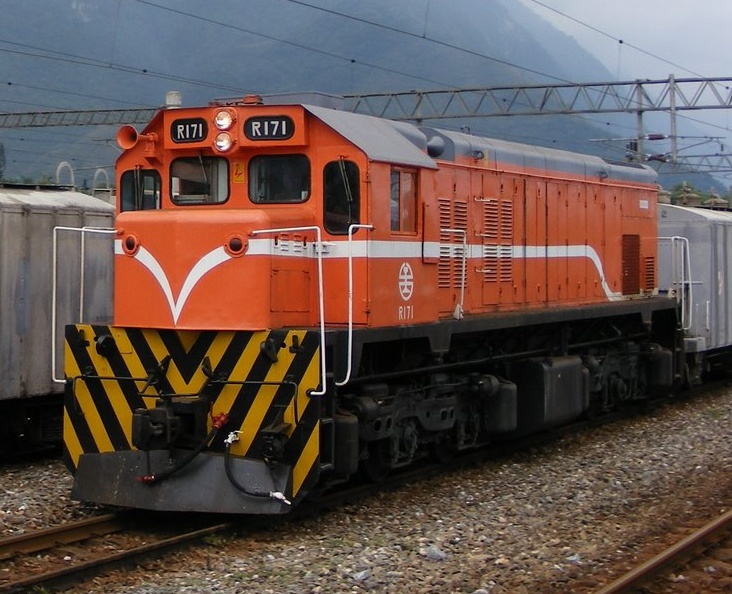
- Taiwan Railways Administration R171 at Sincheng Taroko Station
Type and origin
- Power type: Diesel–electric
- Builder: Astarsa, Equipamentos Villares S.A., Electro-Motive Division, General Motors Diesel, Henschel & Sohn GmbH, MACOSA
- Model: G22CW, G22CU, G22CU-2, GL22C, GL22C-2, GL22MC
- Build date: February 1969 - August 2001
- Total produced: 410
Specifications
- Configuration
  - AAR: C–C
  - UIC: Co′–Co′
- Gauge: 4 ft 8 1/2 in (1,435 mm) or 3 ft 6 in (1,067 mm)
- Driver dia.: 40 in (1,016 mm)
- Wheelbase: 11 ft 11 in (3.63 m) between bolsters; 6 ft 6 in (1.98 m) between axles in each truck
- Length: 46 ft 6 in (14.17 m) over the coupler pulling faces
- Width: 9 ft 3 in (2,819 mm) over the grabirons
- Height: 12 ft 6 15/16 in (3,834 mm)
- Loco weight: 84 t (82.7 long tons; 92.6 short tons)
- Fuel capacity: 1,700–2,000 US gal (6,400–7,600 L; 1,400–1,700 imp gal)
- Prime mover: EMD 12-645E
- Aspiration: Roots blower
- Cylinders: V12
Performance figures
- Maximum speed: 65–93 miles per hour (105–150 kilometres per hour)
- Power output: 1,500–1,650 hp (1,120–1,230 kW)
Career
- Nicknames: "Pup”
- Locale: Argentina, Brazil, Sri Lanka, Guinea, Liberia, Morocco, Mali, Nigeria, Pakistan, Peru, Senegal, Taiwan

The EMD G22C Series were first introduced in 1968 to replace the popular G12 along with various improvements. They carry a low per axle weight on their Flexicoil Type-GC trucks and were now the first model series to have a low nose as a standard option as well.

The G22 series now carries a U or W suffix after the model designation to indicate the type of traction motors. A C indicates six-axle C trucks, while a 4 indicates six-axle A1A trucks (only four of them powered); although there never has been an indication of A1A trucks until 1993.

The designations could apply to any kind of export locomotive design of EMD or another licensee of EMD as long as the electrical & mechanical gear was left unaltered.

== Overview ==
With the introduction of the 645 engine for export models in 1967, the model designation numbers changed by adding 10. To meet customer demands of a six axle version of the popular G12, EMD created the GR12 which was slightly longer and taller to accommodate the six axle Type-GC trucks.

Although the orders lacked for the GR12 due to the weight and size of the locomotive, EMD revised and designed the lighter G22 series model to accommodate the Flexicoil Type-C truck and introducing the new EMD 645 series engine. With relocation of the batteries within the carbody and increasing the fuel tank capacity, the G22C series was the same length to that of its four axle counterpart, the G22. Production spanned longer than the four axle G22 version, but with smaller orders.

Several models were introduced:

- G22CW
- G22CU
- G22CU-2
- GL22C
- GL22C-2
- GL22MC

== G22CW ==
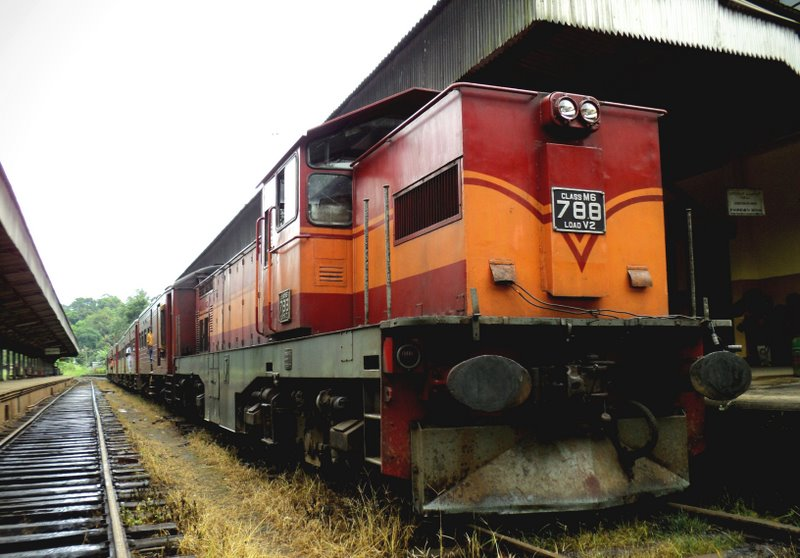
G22CW In Sri Lanka - Class M6 Locomotive

The EMD G22CW was first introduced in 1969. Unlike its predecessor GR12, the G22CW carried a CW suffix which indicated that this model had six axles (C) and traction motors that could fit from standard gauge rails to 5 ft 6 in (1,676 mm) gauge rails (W).

The G22CW found most of its popularity in Argentina and Sri Lanka, as the largest order were each placed by them with 15 units.

Production spanned from July 1976 to November 1990

GM G22CW orders
Builder	Country	Railroad	Quantity	Road numbers	Notes
EVSA	Peru	Centromin	1	39	The only G22C built by Equipamentos Villares S.A.
EMD	Peru	Cerro de Pasco	1	38	The First G22CW built
ASTARSA	Argentina	Ferrocarriles Argentinos	40	7901 – 7940	
Thyssen Henschel	Sri Lanka	Sri Lanka Railways	16	783 – 798	Imported to Sri Lanka in 1979. Still in operation.

== G22CU ==
The EMD G22CU first appeared in 1969. Designed mainly for the narrow gauge market, the G22CU carries a CU suffix which indicates that this model has six axles (C) and traction motors that can fit from one meter gauge to 5 ft 6 in gauge rails (U).

The G22CU found most of its popularity in Pakistan, as older locomotives were being replaced.

Production spanned from February 1969 to June 1982.

EMD G22CU Orders
Builder	Country	Railroad	Quantity	Road Numbers	Notes
EMD	Chile	Ferrocarril de Antofagasta a Bolivia	2	1410 – 1411	#1410 is the first G22CU built
EMD	Mali	Chemin de Fer du Mali	2	CC1671 – CC1672	1 meter gauge
EMD & ASTARSA	Argentina	Ferrocarriles Argentinos	96	7701 – 7796	Assigned to Ferrocarril General Belgrano; 7701 – 7720 built by General Motors, 7721 – 7796 built by ASTARSA
EMD	Liberia	National Iron Ore Co. Ltd.	2	28 – 29	
EMD & GMD	Pakistan	Pakistan Railways	62	4801 – 4832, 4901 – 4930	4801 – 4832 built by EMD, 4901 – 4930 built by GMD
EMD	Taiwan	Taiwan Railway Administration	25	R151 – R175	
MACOSA	Brazil	Viação Férrea do Rio Grande do Sul (RFFSA)	24	6201 – 6224	Built during the Brazilian Miracle era

== G22CU-2 ==
Beginning on January 1, 1972, export locomotives then had the option to carry EMD Dash 2 electronics, adding the (-2) suffix to the locomotive model. Only Argentina and Taiwan purchased the G22CU-2.

Production spanned from March 1992 to August 2001

EMD G22CU-2 Orders
Builder	Country	Railroad	Quantity	Road Numbers	Notes
EMD	Argentina	Belgrano Sur Line	5	MF701 – MF705	
EMD	Taiwan	Taiwan Cement	6	R191 – R196	
EMD	Taiwan	Taiwan Railway Administration	10	R181 – R190	

== GL22C ==
When most second and third world railroads couldn't operate standard EMD Locomotives due to their weight, EMD introduced the L suffix which indicated the locomotive had a lightweight frame. The locomotive designation was changed to GL22C. However, as these locomotives had a much lighter frame, the application of the U or W suffixes no longer applied.

Production spanned from December 1971 to May 1977

EMD GL22C Orders
Builder	Country	Railroad	Quantity	Road Numbers	Notes
Henschel & Son	Mali	Chemin de Fer du Mali	2	CC1681 – CC1682	
EMD	Nigeria	Nigerian Railway Corporation	30	1126 – 1155	
EMD	Guinea	Office National du Chemin de Fer de Guinée	2	CC1601 – CC1602	
Henschel & Son	Senegal	Régie des Chemins de Fer du Senegal	2	CC1701 – CC1703	
EMD	Morocco	Société Ferrite de Rif	2	1 – 2	

== GL22C-2 ==
Being the rarest of the G22C series, the GL22C-2 model combined a lightweight frame and the new EMD Dash 2 electronics.

Production was only for Queensland Rail, who were the sole purchaser.

EMD GL22C-2 Orders
Builder	Country	Railroad	Quantity	Road Numbers	Notes
Clyde Engineering	Australia	Queensland Rail	24	2400 – 2423	2400 class
Clyde Engineering	Australia	Queensland Rail	18	2450 – 2467	2450 class
Clyde Engineering	Australia	Queensland Rail	38	2470 – 2507	2470 class

== GL22MC ==
- New Zealand DF Class 30
- Togo Rail S.A CC class 1651 to 1653.

== Phasing ==
Only two general variations have been noticed during the G22C production.

Phase 1: Larger frame sill, air reservoir slung under skirting.

Phase 2: Smaller frame sill, air reservoir exposed, and two horizontal bars along intake grilles.

There have been various as-modifications on railroads as well, but are excluded due to various degrees of completion on the modification.

== Models ==
The G22CU/G22CW model is represented in HO scale by Frateschi. Due to the accommodation of the motor, the model is not entirely accurate.

== See also ==
- List of EMD locomotives
- List of GMD Locomotives
- EMD G22CU
- Brazilian Miracle
- RFFSA
- Astarsa

== Sources ==
- Electro-Motive Division Export GM Models
- Astilleros Argentinos Rio de la Plata S.A. GM Export Models
- Material Y Construcciones S.A. GM Export Models
- Henschel und Sohn GmbH GM Export Models
- Equipamentos Villares S.A. GM Export Models
- General Motors Diesel Division Export Models
- Frateschi G22CU HO Scale Model
- GM G22CU Data Sheet
- EMD G22CU Article in Portuguese
