= Queensland Railways 2470 class =

Class of Australian diesel-electric locomotives

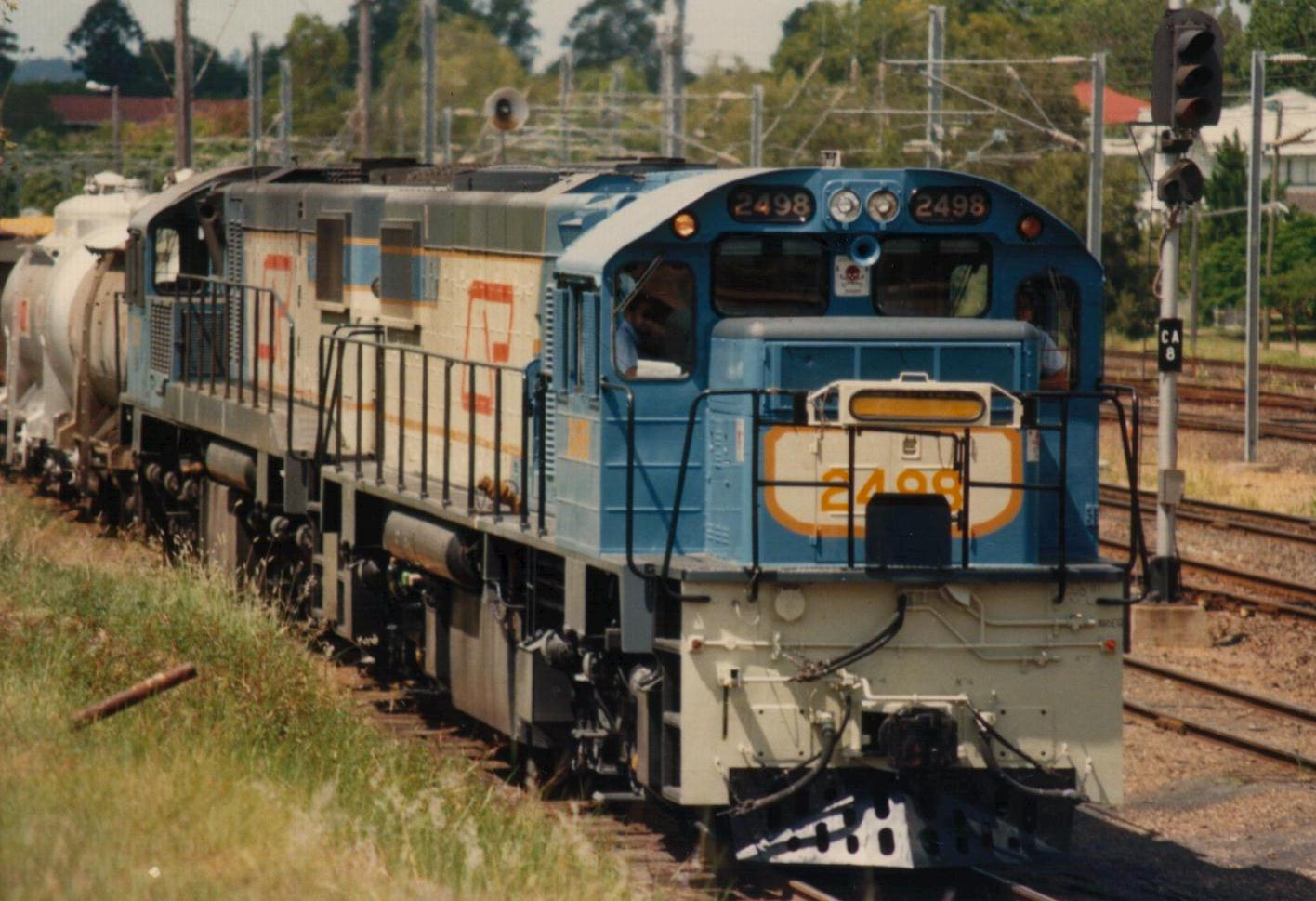
- 2498 at Corinda in February 1998
Type and origin
- Power type: Diesel-electric
- Builder: Clyde Engineering, Eagle Farm
- Serial number: 81-976 to 81-988; 81-999; 81-1006 to 81-1009; 82-1126 to 82-1145
- Model: EMD GL22C-2
- Build date: 1980–1983
- Total produced: 38
- Rebuilder: Redbank Railway Workshops
- Rebuild date: 2000–2002
- Number rebuilt: 6
Specifications
- Configuration
  - UIC: Co-Co
- Gauge: 1,067 mm (3 ft 6 in)
- Length: 18.04 m (59 ft 2 in)
- Loco weight: 91.8 t (90.4 long tons; 101.2 short tons)
- Fuel type: Diesel
- Fuel capacity: 6,364 L (1,400 imp gal; 1,681 US gal)
- Prime mover: EMD 12-645E
- Engine type: V12 Diesel engine
- Aspiration: Roots blower
- Generator: EMD AR6-D14
- Traction motors: EMD D29
- Cylinders: 12
Performance figures
- Power output: 1,119 kW (1,501 hp)
Career
- Operators: Queensland Railways
- Number in class: 38
- Numbers: 2470–2507
- First run: December 1980
- Current owner: Aurizon, Queensland Rail
- Disposition: 30 in service, 6 in service as 2300 class, 1 stored, 1 under overhaul

The 2470 class is a class of diesel locomotives built by Clyde Engineering, Eagle Farm for Queensland Railways between 1980 and 1983.

== History ==
The 2470 class were an evolution of the 2450 class. They differed in having lighter alternators and smaller fuel tanks. A 2470 class was built by Clyde Engineering for the Townsville Harbour Board, this was later sold to Queensland Rail and renumbered as 2507.

Between 2000 and 2002, six were rebuilt as 2300 class locomotives at Redbank Railway Workshops.
