= List of rolling stock used by Egyptian National Railways =

The following page is a list of stock used by Egyptian National Railways.

== Current ==
=== Locomotives ===
The vast majority of ENR locomotives are diesel. These include:

Class	Image	Type	Top speed		Number	Numeration	Remarks	Built
Class	Image	Type	mph	km/h	Number	Numeration	Remarks	Built
EMD G12		Bo-Bo Diesel electric locomotive	75	121	97	3701–3797		
EMD G16		Co-Co Diesel electric locomotive	77	124	16	3301–3316		1960–1961
EMD G16W	Photo of EMD G16W locomotive in use by Egyptian National Railways	Co-Co Diesel electric locomotive			45	3317–3361		1964–1965
AA22T		Co-Co Diesel electric locomotive	75	120	280	3001-3221, 3241–3299		1976–1992
EMD G22 Series		Diesel electric locomotive			32	3801–3832		1977
EMD G22CU		Diesel electric locomotive	65	105				
EMD G8		Diesel electric locomotive				3200 series		
GA DE900		Bo-Bo Diesel electric locomotive			30			2000
EMD JT42CWRM (Class 66)		Diesel electric locomotive			40			2009
GE ES40ACi		Diesel electric locomotive			80			2009
GE ES30ACi		Diesel electric locomotive			100			2019
Siemens Vectron		Electric locomotive	75	120	41 ordered			

In 2009 ENR began taking delivery of 40 Electro-Motive Diesel JT42CWRM (Series 66) locomotives for passenger services. In 2009, ENR received 80 dual cab ES40ACi locomotives in two versions (painted blue for passenger trains and red/black for freight trains).

In 2017, Egyptian National Railways placed an order for 100 ES30ACi Light Evolution Series Locomotives valued at worth $575 million that can be used for both passengers or freight rail. The first 10 units were delivered in November 2019.

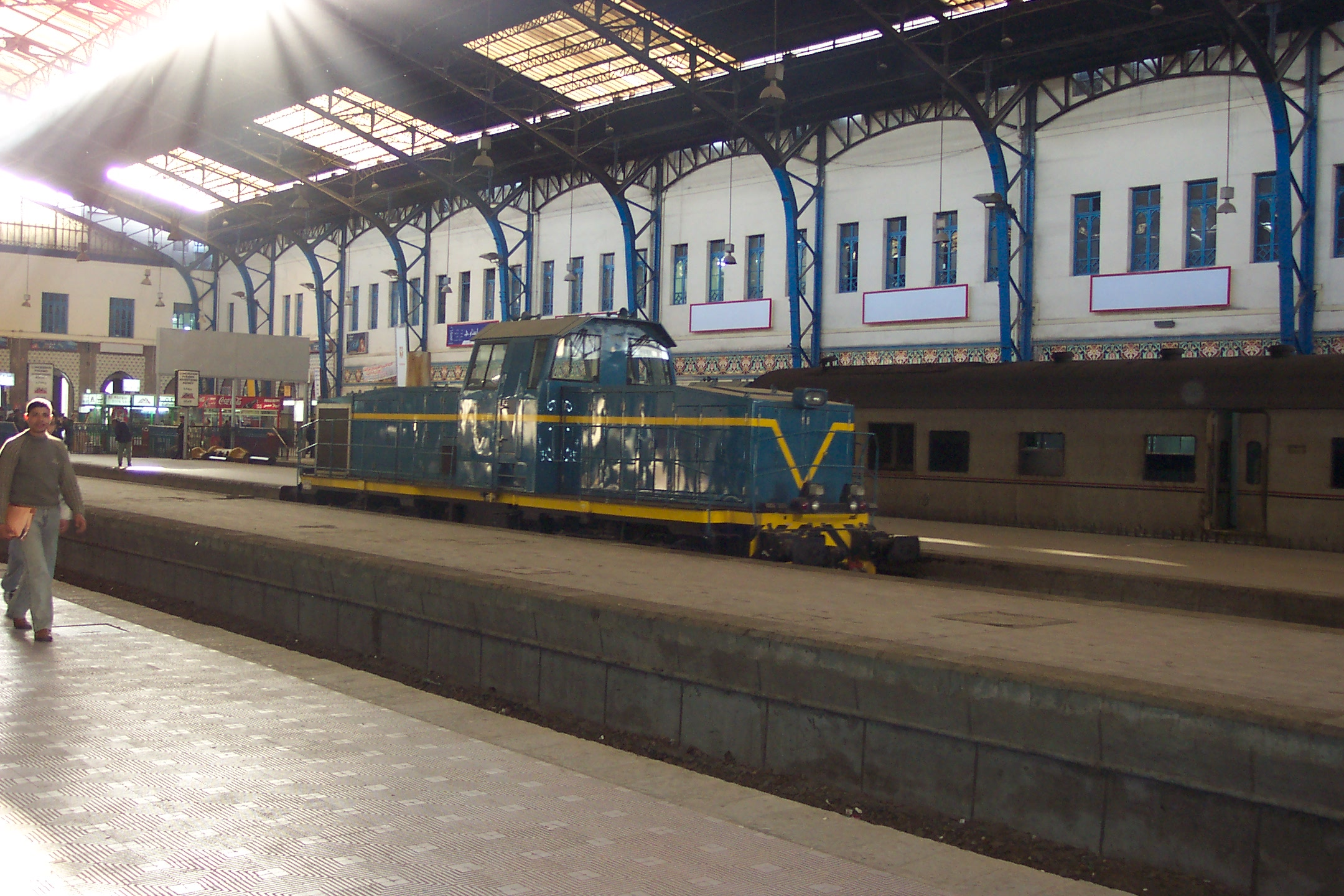
Diesel locomotive at Ramses Station, Cairo in 2005

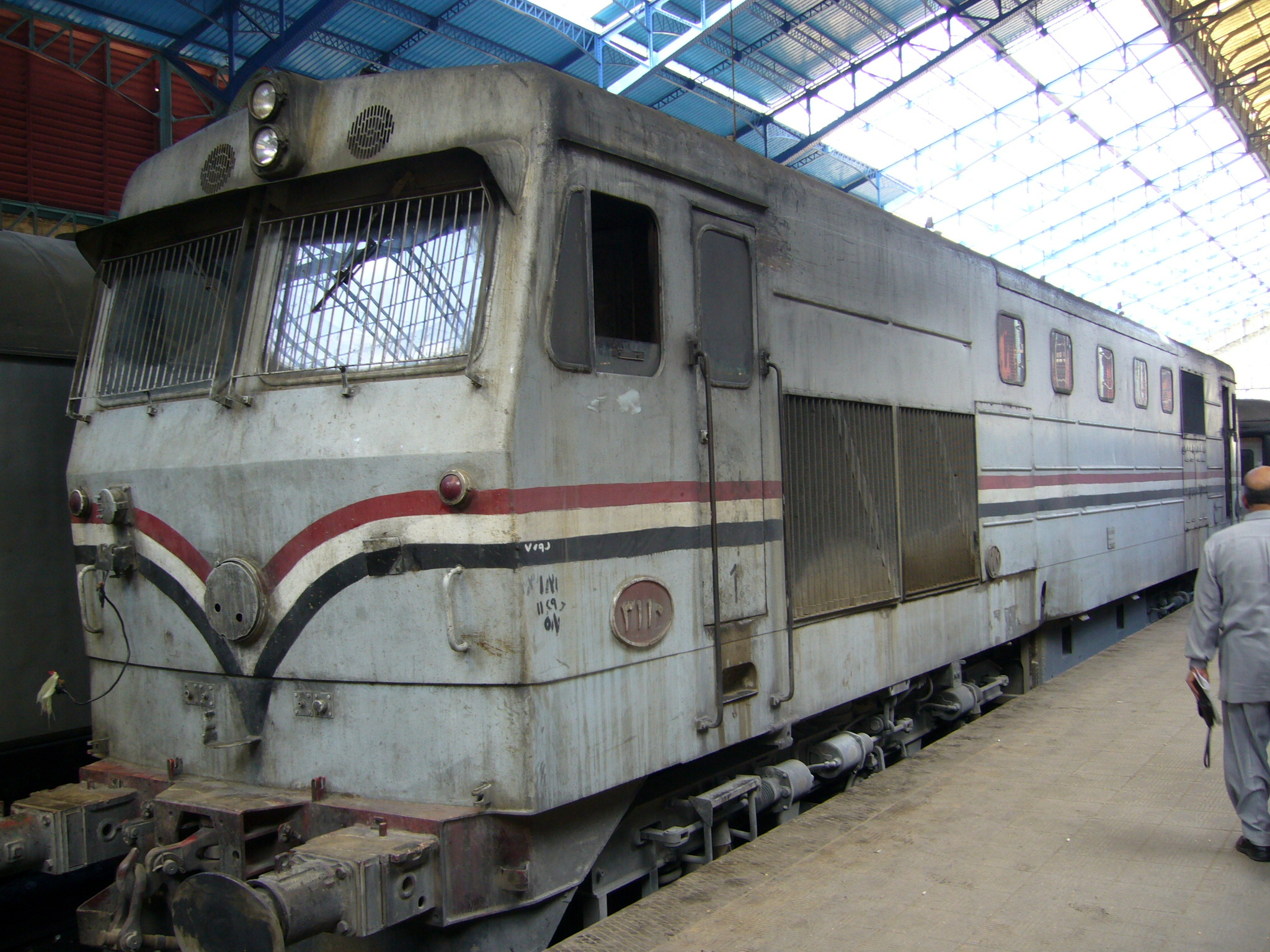
Henschel AA22T diesel locomotive in 2006

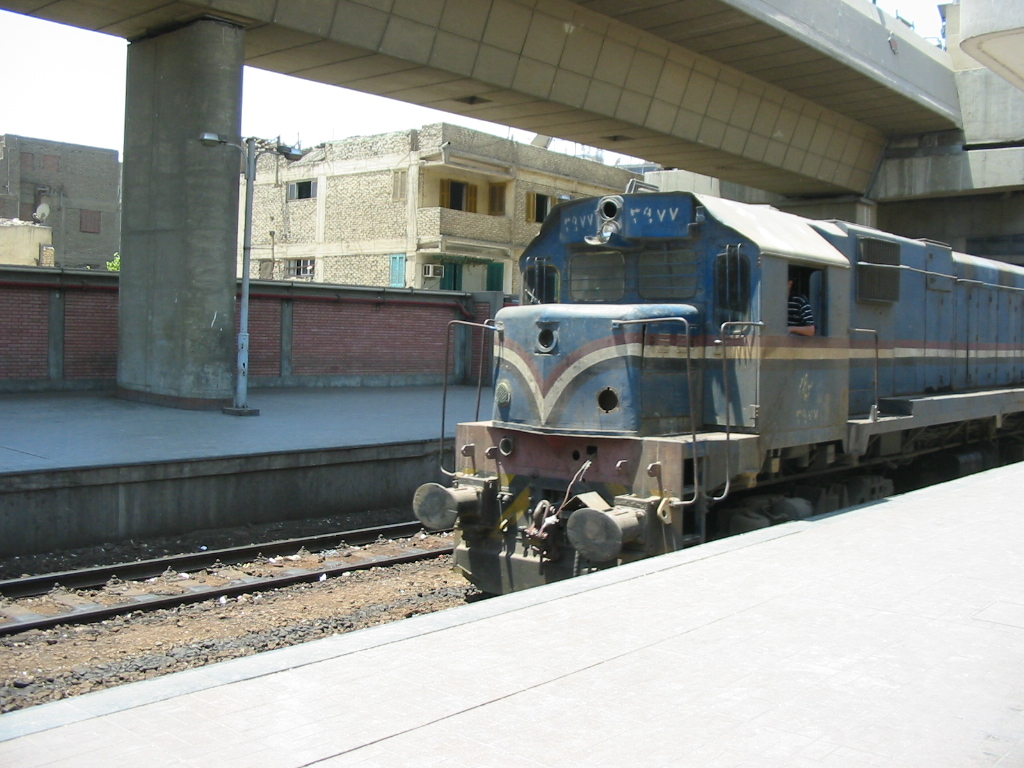
3801 class EMD G22W diesel locomotive no. 3977 passing through El Giza Station in 2008

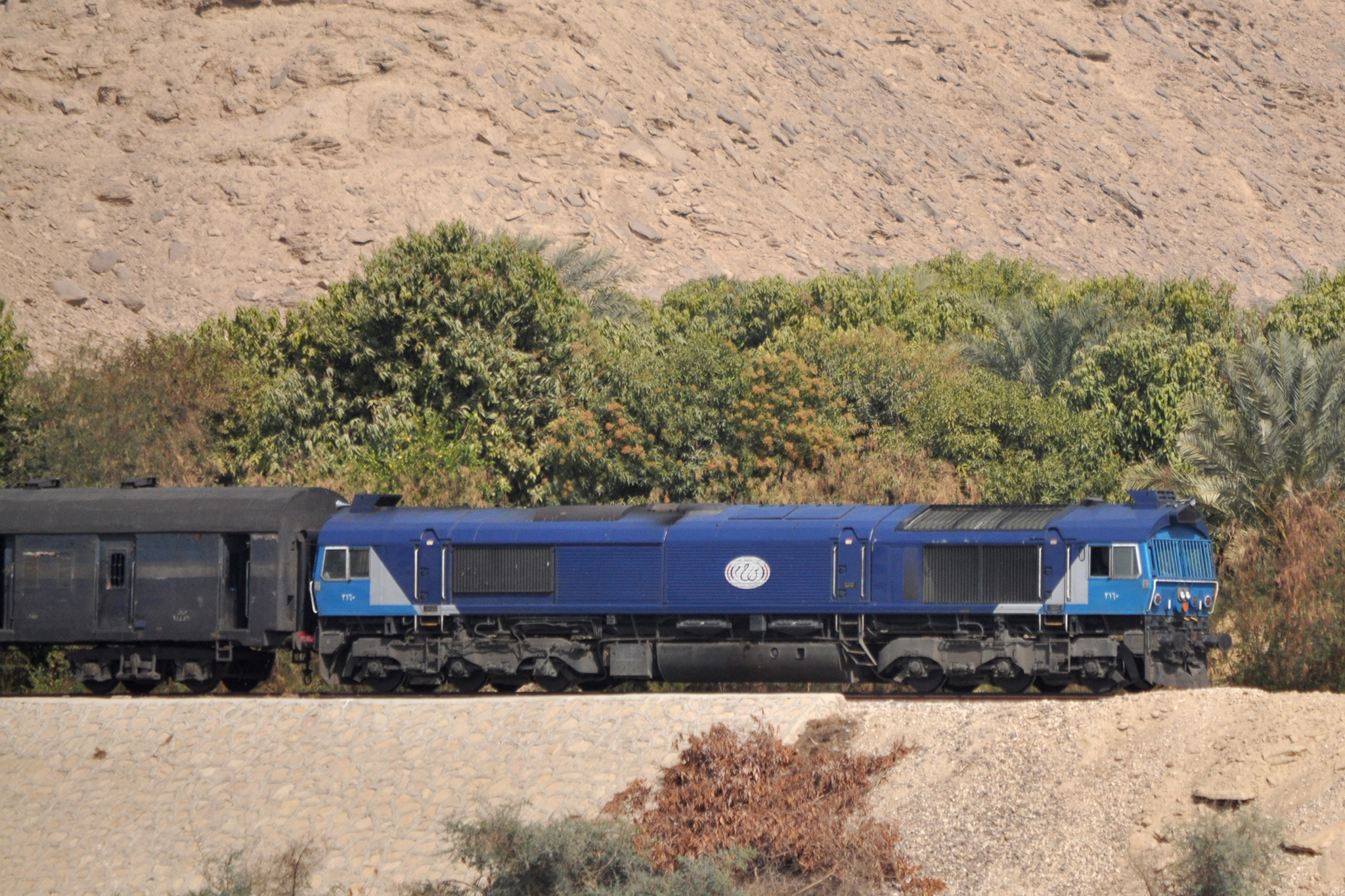
2160 working a passenger train near Aswan

=== Trainsets ===
Class	Image	Type	Top speed		Number	Numeration	Remarks	Built
Class	Image	Type	mph	km/h	Number	Numeration	Remarks	Built
Turbo Train DMU		DMU						
CRRC Sifang		EMU			22 (132 cars)		Used on Cairo Light Rail Transit	
Siemens Velaro Egypt		EMU	143	230	41 ordered (328 cars)			
Siemens Desiro HC		EMU	100	160	94 ordered (376 cars)			

=== Passenger cars ===
Class	Image	Type	Top speed		Number	Numeration	Remarks	Built
Class	Image	Type	mph	km/h	Number	Numeration	Remarks	Built
TVZ coaches				160	722 + 578 ordered			2021 - c. t.
Talgo Egypt					6 (and 7 ordered yet)			

== Retired ==
=== Locomotives ===
Class	Image	Type	Top speed		Number	Remarks	Built
Class	Image	Type	mph	km/h	Number	Remarks	Built
545		2-6-0 Steam locomotive			80	Built by several companies	1928–1931
8F		2-8-0 Steam locomotive			40	Former War Department locomotives. Sold to Railways. Series 9301–915, 9317–9320, 9322–9342.	1935-1946
		1A-Do-A1 Diesel locomotive	75	121	6	Built by English Electric. UK.	1945-1947
4211		0-6-0 Diesel locomotive			42	Built by Arnold Jung Lokomotivfabrik	1953–1956
4300		C diesel-hydraulic locomotive	37	60	98	Loosely based on Jung's WR 360 C14 series. In 1955 MÁVAG has won ENR's tender for 100 diesel-hydraulic shunting locomotives. Built by MÁVAG, and later by Ganz–MÁVAG. MÁVAG delivered 56 units between the end of 1957 and September 1958. Because of severe engine failures ENR temporarily halted the takeover of the rest of the units, until Ganz–MÁVAG redesigned the engine and replaced it on the already delivered units. Hungarian State Railways bought 6 units from ENR in late 1958. ENR later gave 5 units to the Helwan steel works.	1957–September 1958; 1962
