= Queensland Railways 1550 class =

Australian diesel-electric locomotives

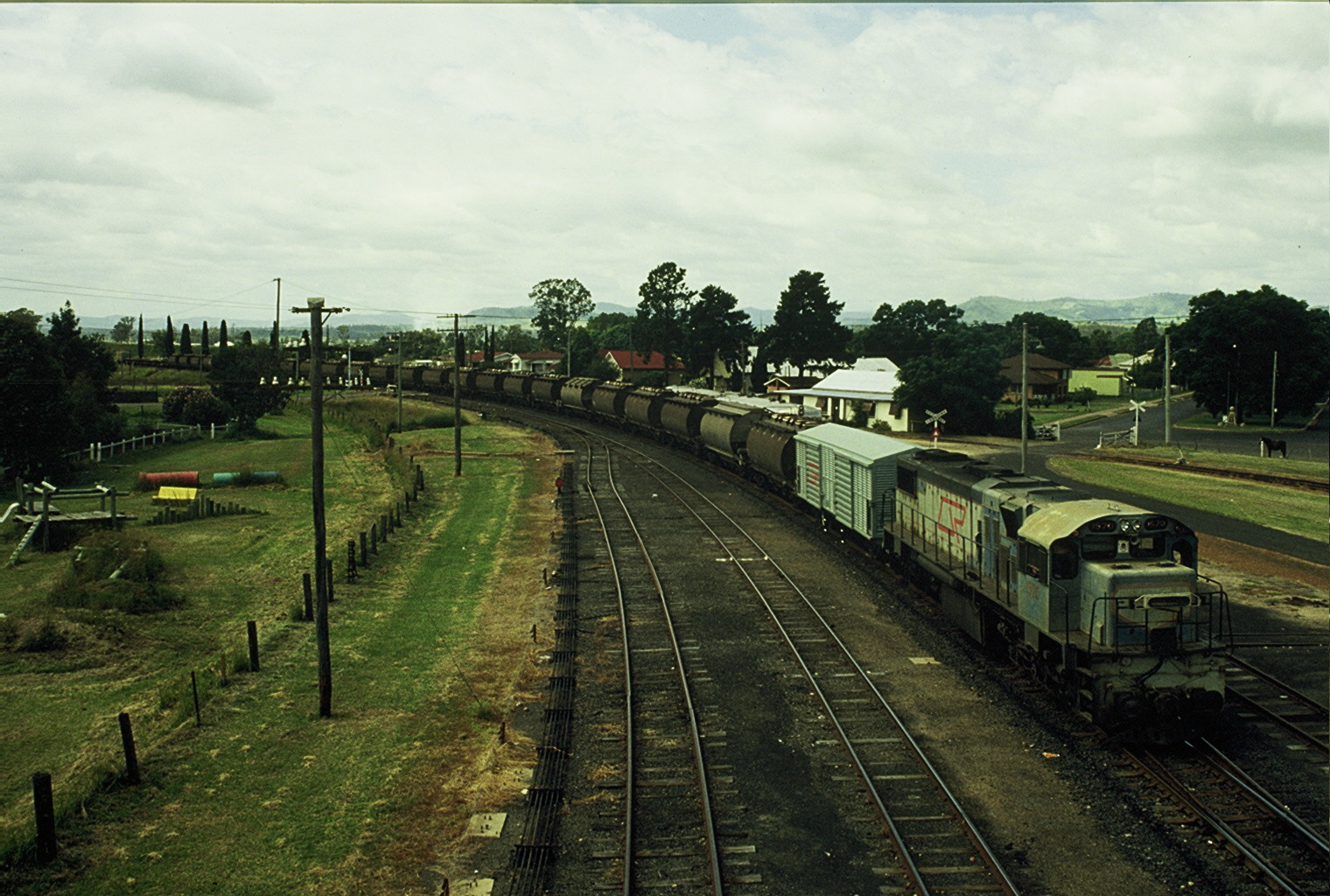
- 1576 at Helidon in 1987
Type and origin
- Power type: Diesel-electric
- Builder: Clyde Engineering, Eagle Farm
- Serial number: 72-765 to 72-770; 75-802 to 75-811; 76-813 to 76-823
- Model: Electro-Motive Diesel GL22C
- Build date: 1972-1976
- Total produced: 27
- Rebuilder: Redbank Railway Workshops
- Rebuild date: 1997-2004
- Number rebuilt: 25
Specifications
- Configuration
  - UIC: Co-Co
- Gauge: 1,067 mm (3 ft 6 in)
- Length: 18.04 m (59 ft 2 in)
- Loco weight: 91.8 t (90.4 long tons; 101.2 short tons)
- Fuel type: Diesel
- Prime mover: Electro-Motive Diesel 645E
- Engine type: V12 Diesel engine
- Aspiration: Roots blower
- Generator: Electro-Motive Diesel AR10
- Traction motors: Electro-Motive Diesel D29
- Cylinders: 12
- Cylinder size: ? x ?
Performance figures
- Power output: 1,119 kW (1,501 hp)
Career
- Operators: Queensland Railways
- Number in class: 27
- Numbers: 1550-1576
- First run: September 1972
- Current owner: Aurizon
- Disposition: 19 in service as 2300 class 6 in service as 2250 class 2 scrapped

The 1550 class was a class of diesel locomotives built by Clyde Engineering, Eagle Farm for Queensland Railways between 1972 and 1976.

== History ==
The 1550 class were the first locomotives in Queensland to be fitted with low noses. An initial order for 16 locomotives was followed by 11 that were financed by the Queensland Phosphate mining group. The second batch differed in having a lower roofline to give better clearance when operating under wires.

Two have been scrapped, while between 1997 and 2004, 19 were rebuilt as 2300 class locomotives, and six as 2250 class locomotives at Redbank Railway Workshops.
