= Queensland Railways 2450 class =

Class of Australian diesel-electric locomotives

Type and origin
- Power type: Diesel-electric
- Builder: Clyde Engineering, Eagle Farm
- Serial number: 79-915 to 79-926; 80-946 to 80-951
- Model: EMD GL22C-2
- Build date: 1979–1980
- Total produced: 18
- Rebuilder: Redbank Railway Workshops
- Rebuild date: 1999–2002
- Number rebuilt: 17
Specifications
- Configuration
  - UIC: Co-Co
- Gauge: 1,067 mm (3 ft 6 in)
- Length: 18.04 m (59 ft 2 in)
- Loco weight: 91.8 t (90.4 long tons; 101.2 short tons)
- Fuel type: Diesel
- Fuel capacity: 6,364 L (1,400 imp gal; 1,681 US gal)
- Prime mover: EMD 12-645E
- Engine type: V12 Diesel engine
- Aspiration: Roots blower
- Generator: EMD AR10-D14
- Traction motors: EMD D29
- Cylinders: 12
Performance figures
- Power output: 1,119 kW (1,501 hp)
Career
- Operators: Queensland Railways
- Number in class: 18
- Numbers: 2450–2467
- First run: May 1979
- Current owner: Aurizon
- Disposition: 17 in service as 2300 class 1 scrapped

The 2450 class was a class of diesel locomotives built by Clyde Engineering, Eagle Farm for Queensland Railways in 1979–1980.

== History ==
The 2450 class were an evolution of the 2400 class. They differed in having air-conditioning, aluminium cabinet doors and upgraded generators.

Between 1999 and 2002, seventeen were rebuilt as 2300 class locomotives at Redbank Railway Workshops.
