= Queensland Railways 2300 class =

Class of Australian diesel-electric locomotives

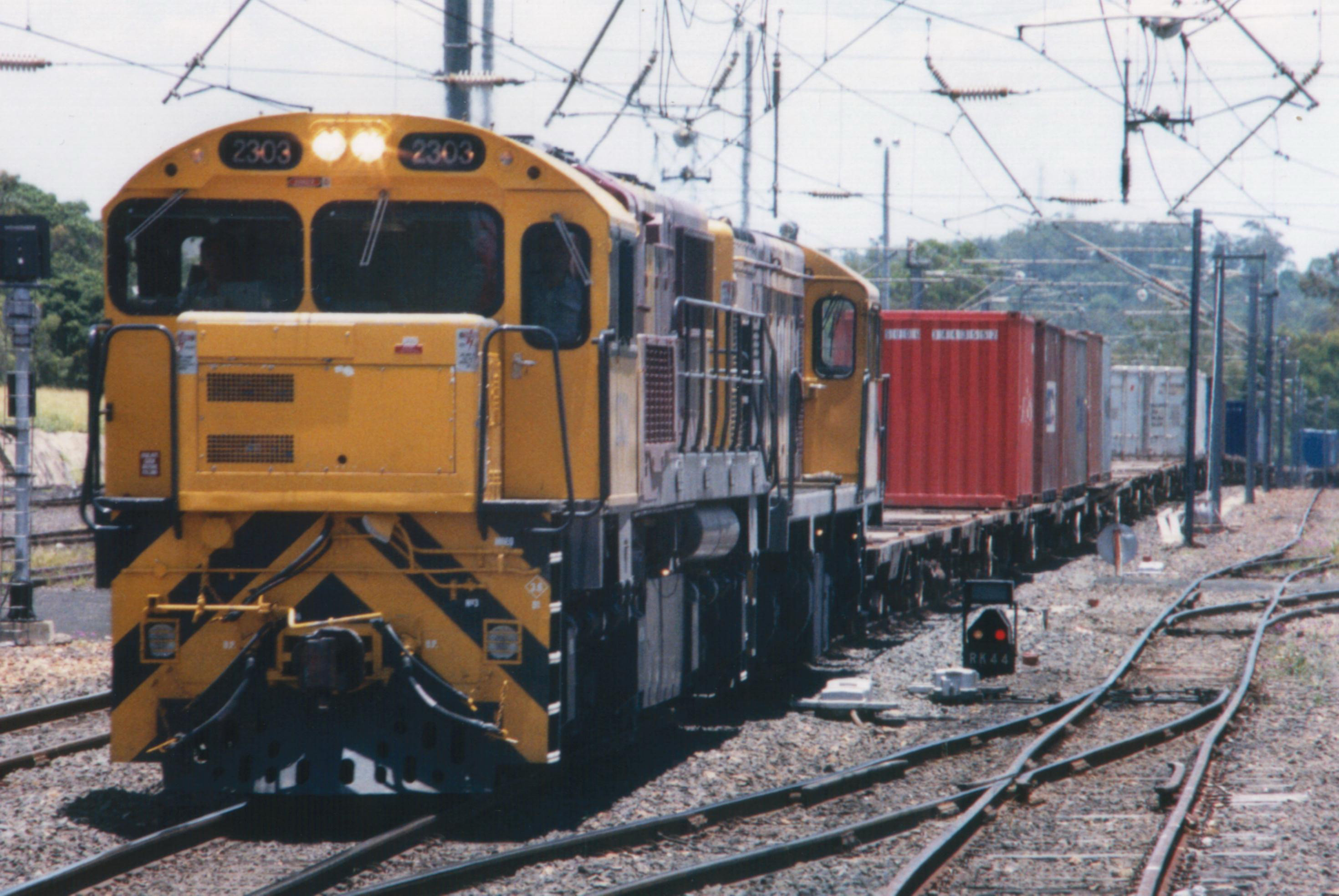
Type and origin
- Power type: Diesel-electric
- Builder: Redbank Railway Workshops
- Model: Electro-Motive Diesel GT22LC-2
- Build date: 1997-2002
- Total produced: 60
Specifications
- Configuration
  - UIC: Co-Co
- Gauge: 1,067 mm (3 ft 6 in)
- Length: 18.04 m (59 ft 2 in)
- Loco weight: 94.5 t (93.0 long tons; 104.2 short tons)
- Fuel type: Diesel
- Prime mover: Electro-Motive Diesel 645E3C
- Engine type: V12 Diesel engine
- Aspiration: Turbocharged
- Generator: Electro-Motive Diesel AR6-D14CA5; Electro-Motive Diesel AR10G-D14CA5
- Traction motors: Electro-Motive Diesel D29
- Cylinders: 12
Performance figures
- Power output: 2,250 hp (1,680 kW)
Career
- Operators: Queensland Railways
- Number in class: 60
- Numbers: 2301-2315, 2320-2323, 2330-2339, 2346-2353, 2355-2366, 2370-2374, 2387-2392
- Delivered: 1997
- First run: 1997
- Last run: 2002
- Current owner: Aurizon
- Disposition: 54 in service, 6 rebuilt, 1 stored

The 2300 class is a class of diesel locomotives rebuilt by Queensland Rail's Redbank Railway Workshops between 1997 and 2002.

== History ==
The 2300 class includes former 1550 and 2400, 2450 and 2470 class locomotives that were rebuilt between 1997 and 2002. Nineteen 1550 class locomotives (1550-1561, 1563-1566 and 1568-1570) were rebuilt as 2301-2315 and 2320-2323. Eighteen 2400 class locomotives (2400-2409 and 2416-2423) were rebuilt as 2330-2339 and 2346-2353. All seventeen remaining 2450 class locomotives (2450-2466) were rebuilt as 2355-2366 and 2370-2374. Six 2470 class locomotives (2501-2506) were rebuilt as 2387-2392.

The rebuilds included new cabs, Dash 2 electronics and the replacement of the roots blower supercharger with a turbocharger. In 2007, seven (2356, 2349, 2361, 2370, 2372, 2373 and 2374) were allocated to Queensland Rail's Australian Railroad Group subsidiary and transferred to Western Australia where they were re-numbered as DFZ2401-DFZ2407. Currently only DFZ2405 is operational with all other class members in storage at Forrestfield in Perth.

Thirty-four 2300 class locomotives have been overhauled for West Moreton coal traffic as the 2300D class. These locomotives, with larger fuel tanks and a toilet at the end of the long hood weigh 96 tonnes and are restricted to operation on the coal routes. They include numbers 2301D-2315D, 2320D-2323D, 2330D-2334D, 2336D-2337D, 2339D, 2346D-2348D, 2350D, 2352D, 2359D, 2364D, 2366D and 2388D. The former 1550 class locomotives in this group (2301, 2304-2307, 2309-2315 and 2320-2322) were upgraded with modular (Dash 2) electronics when they were overhauled.

In 2023, Aurizon moved locomotives 2332D and 2364D from Queensland to its gypsum-hauling line between Lake MacDonnell and Thevenard, South Australia. To minimise axle load, their larger fuel tanks will not carry a full load.
