= Queensland Railways 2400 class =

Class of Australian diesel-electric locomotives

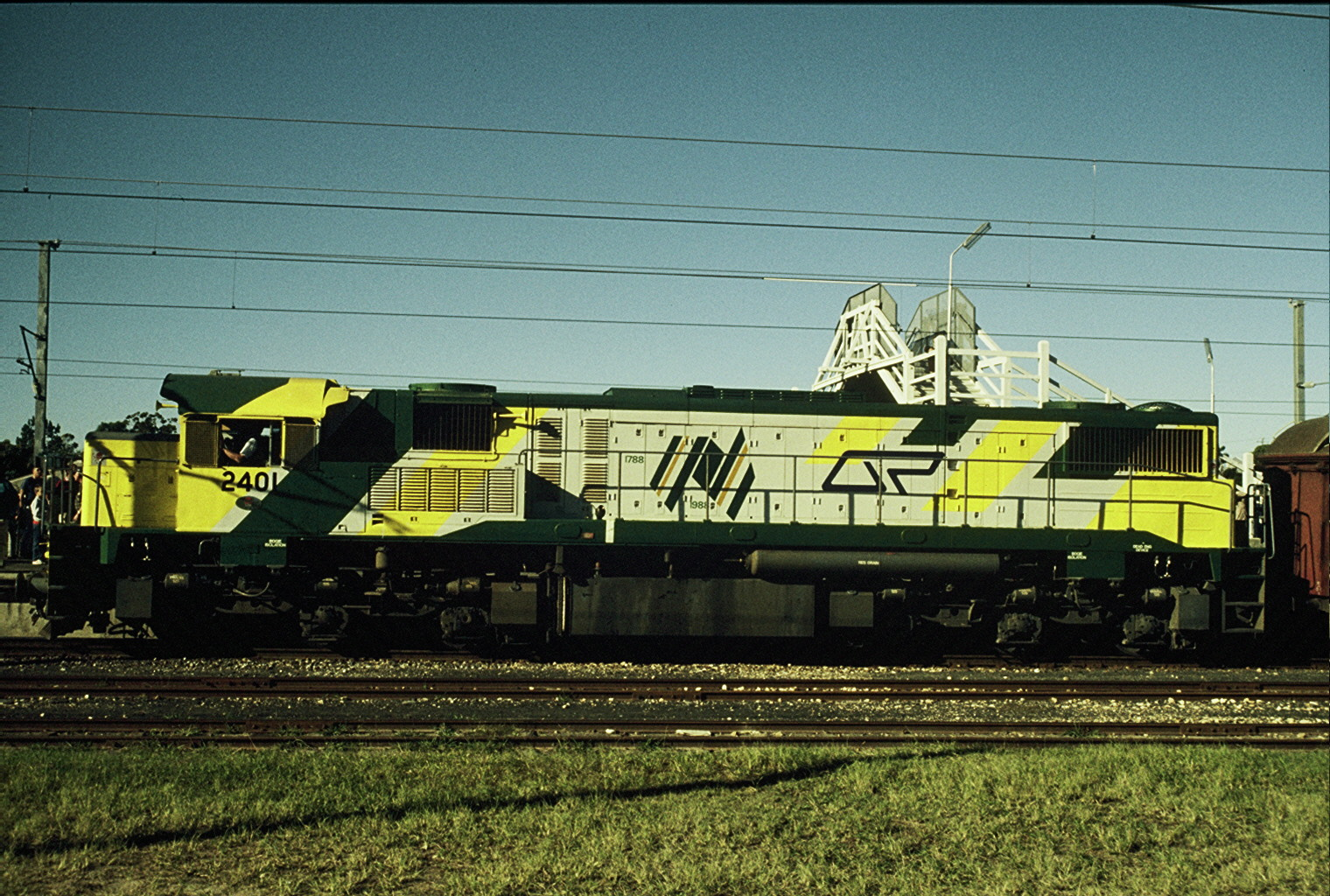
- 2401 in Bicentennial livery in 1987
Type and origin
- Power type: Diesel-electric
- Builder: Clyde Engineering, Eagle Farm
- Serial number: 77-842 to 77-852; 78-853 to 78-865
- Model: EMD GL22C-2
- Build date: 1977–1978
- Total produced: 24
- Rebuilder: Redbank Railway Workshops
- Rebuild date: 1999–2002
- Number rebuilt: 18
Specifications
- Configuration
  - UIC: Co-Co
- Gauge: 1,067 mm (3 ft 6 in)
- Length: 18.04 m (59 ft 2 in)
- Loco weight: 91.8 t (90.4 long tons; 101.2 short tons)
- Fuel type: Diesel
- Fuel capacity: 6,364 L (1,400 imp gal; 1,681 US gal)
- Prime mover: EMD 12-645E
- Engine type: V12 Diesel engine
- Aspiration: Roots blower
- Generator: EMD AR10
- Traction motors: EMD D29
- Cylinders: 12
Performance figures
- Power output: 1,119 kW (1,501 hp)
Career
- Operators: Queensland Railways
- Number in class: 24
- Numbers: 2400–2423
- First run: April 1977
- Current owner: Queensland Rail
- Disposition: 18 in service as 2300 class 4 operational, 1 stored, 1 exported

The 2400 class was a class of diesel locomotives built by Clyde Engineering, Eagle Farm for Queensland Railways in 1977–1978.

== History ==
The 2400 class were an evolution of the 1550 class. They differed in having the modular control system incorporated into the electrical cabinet. Originally it was intended to continue their number sequence from the last 1550, i.e. the first would have been 1577, but this would have required the 1600 class to have been renumbered, so they were instead numbered as the 2400 class.

2401 was repainted in Queensland Railways' Bicentennial "Egg and Lettuce" Livery in 1988.

Between 1999 and 2002, eighteen were rebuilt as 2300 class locomotives at Redbank Railway Workshops. The remaining six were withdrawn with one exported in August 2013 to South Africa.
