= Queensland 4D10 class locomotive =

Queensland Railways 4D10 class
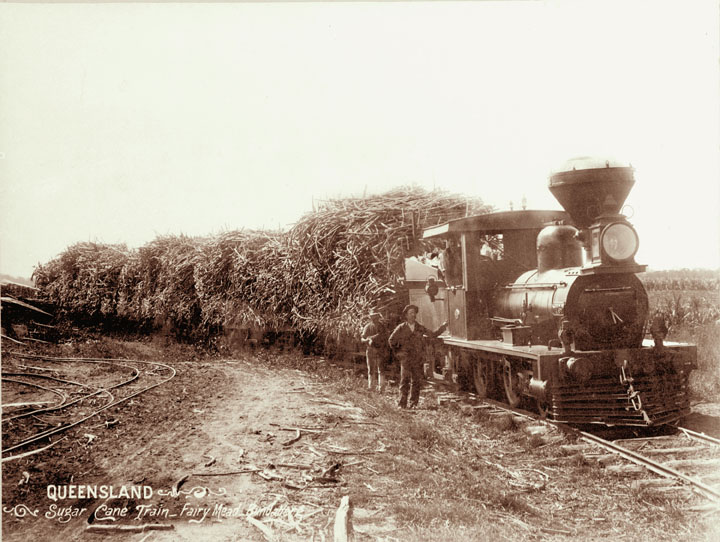
Type and origin
- Power type: Steam
- Builder: North Ipswich Railway Workshops
- Serial number: 4-6
- Build date: 1884/85
Specifications
- Configuration
  - Whyte: 2-4-2T
- Gauge: 1,067 mm (3 ft 6 in)
- Axle load: 11.5t
- Loco weight: 24.1t
- Total weight: 24.1t
- Fuel type: Coal
- Fuel capacity: 1.5 tonnes
- Water cap.: 550 gallons
- Tender cap.: 3 tonnes
- Boiler: NIRW
- Boiler pressure: 120psi
- Heating surface
  - Firebox: 7.1 square feet
- Cylinders: 2 outside
- Cylinder size: 10 in × 18 in (254 mm × 457 mm)
Career
- Operators: Queensland Railways
- Numbers: 6, 9-11, 72-74
- Delivered: 1884
- First run: 1884
- Last run: 1902
- Retired: 1902
- Withdrawn: 1902
- Preserved: 10 (Boiler Only)
- Scrapped: 1903
- Disposition: all scrapped, 10's boiler is at Caboolture

The Queensland Railways 4D10 class locomotive was a class of 2-4-2T steam locomotives operated by the Queensland Railways.

== History ==
In September 1877, a Select Committee recommended no more locomotives be built in the colony. However some materials had already been purchased for proposed new locomotives. In 1884/85 these were put to use to build four 2-4-2T locomotives at North Ipswich Railway Workshops. Per Queensland Railway's classification system they were designated the 4D10 class in 1890, the 4 representing the number of driving wheels, the D that it was a tank locomotive, and the 10 the cylinder diameter in inches. A further four A10 Neilson class were converted to 4D10s.

== Class list ==
Works number	Southern & Western Railway number	Queensland Railways number	In service	Notes
4	72	72	June 1884	Written off November 1902
5	73	73	July 1884	Written off November 1902
6	74	74	February 1885	Written off 1900
