= Queensland A10 Neilson class locomotive =

Class of Australian 0-4-2 locomotives

Queensland Railways A10 Neilson class
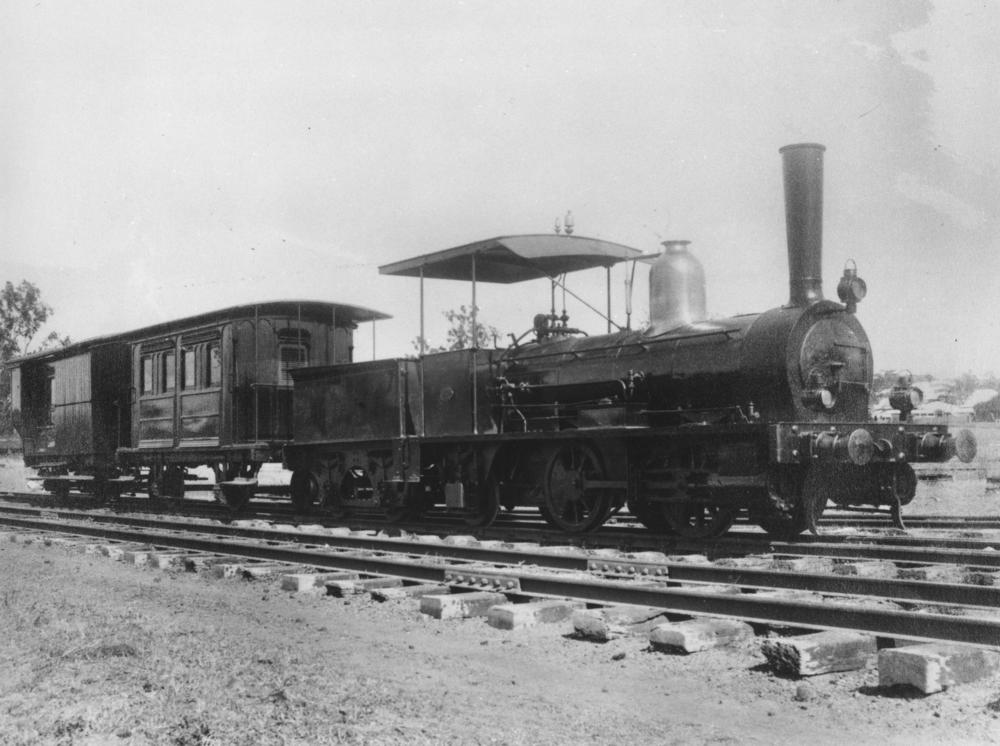
- N° 3 on display for the Railway Pageant at Ipswich in 1936
Type and origin
- Power type: Steam
- Builder: Neilson and Company
- Serial number: 1167-1170, 1208-1215, 1244
Specifications
- Configuration
  - Whyte: 0-4-2
- Gauge: 1,067 mm (3 ft 6 in)
- Driver dia.: 3 ft 0 in (914 mm)
- Loco weight: 13.6 long tons (15.2 short tons; 13.8 t)
- Tender weight: 9.35 long tons (10.5 short tons; 9.50 t)
- Fuel type: Coal
- Fuel capacity: 2.5 long tons (2.80 short tons; 2.54 t)
- Water cap.: 560 imp gal (2,500 L; 670 US gal)
- Boiler pressure: 120 lbf/in^{2} (827 kPa)
- Cylinders: 2 outside
- Cylinder size: 10 in × 18 in (254 mm × 457 mm)
Performance figures
- Tractive effort: 4,800 lbf (21.4 kN)
Career
- Operators: Queensland Railways
- Numbers: 2-14
- Preserved: 3, 6
- Disposition: 2 preserved, 11 scrapped

The Queensland Railways A10 Neilson class locomotive is a class of 0-4-2 steam locomotives operated by the Queensland Railways.

== History ==
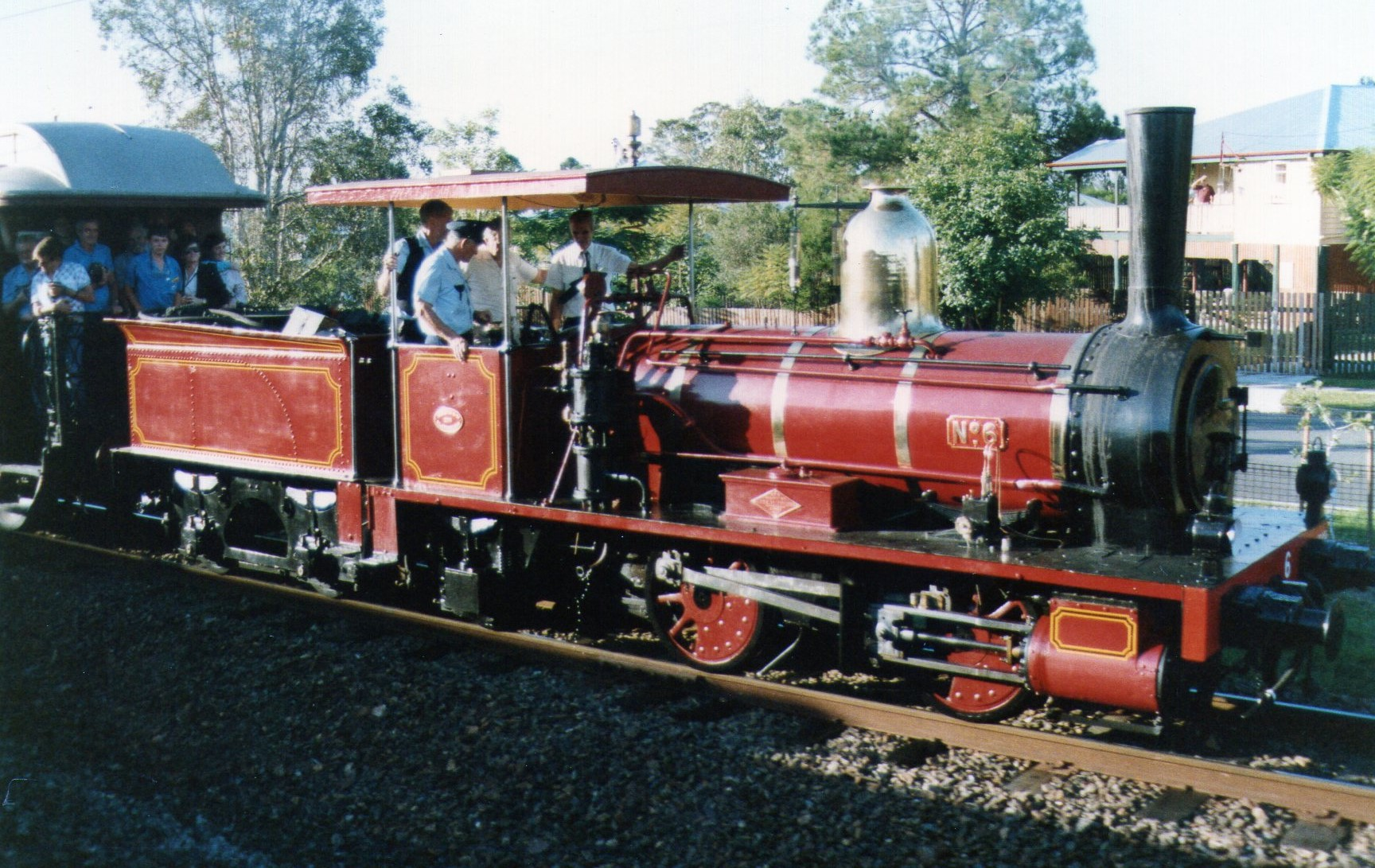
N° 6 on its first trip after restoration 1991

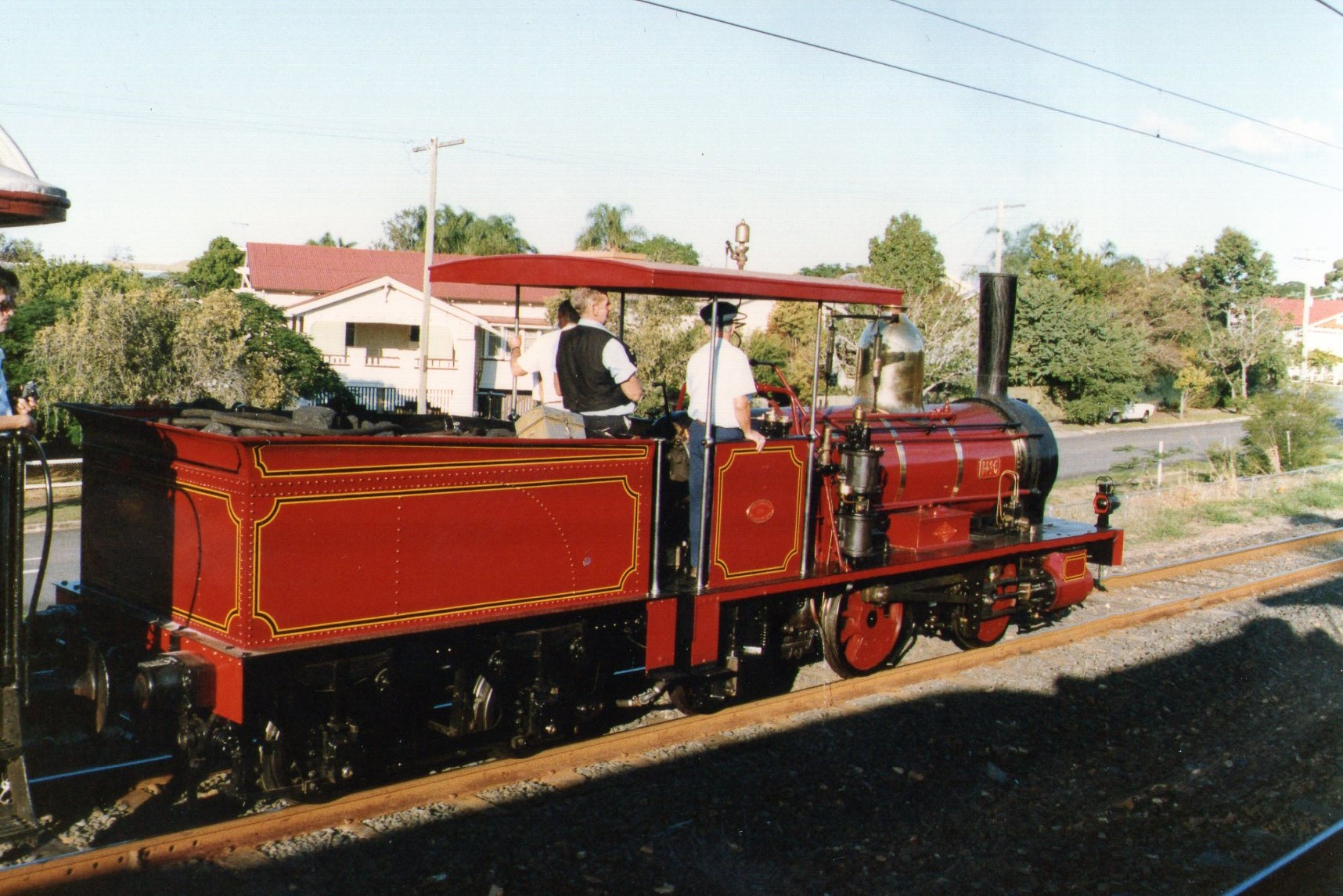
N° 6 on its first post-restoration trip, 1991

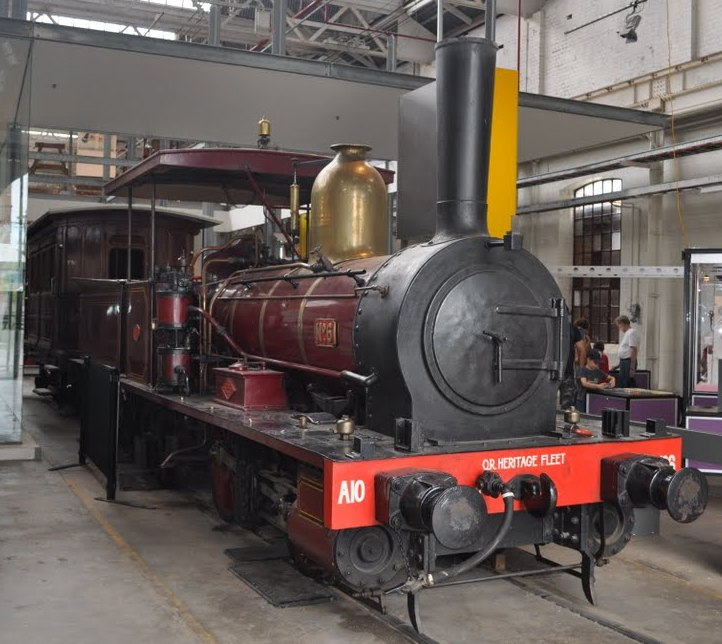
N°6 at the Workshops Rail Museum in 2011

== Overview ==
The A10 Neilson class comprised 13 locomotives. Eight were built in 1865 and 1866 by Neilson and Company, Glasgow for the Southern & Western Railway operating out of Ipswich and another four for the Central Railway operating out of Rockhampton. One engine was also constructed for Peto, Brassey and Betts, a railway contractor building the line to Toowoomba. This was later purchased by the Queensland Railway in 1876. All engines were fitted with injectors instead of feed pumps when built. All of the Central Railway examples were later transferred to the Southern & Western Railway.

== 4D10 tank engine conversions ==
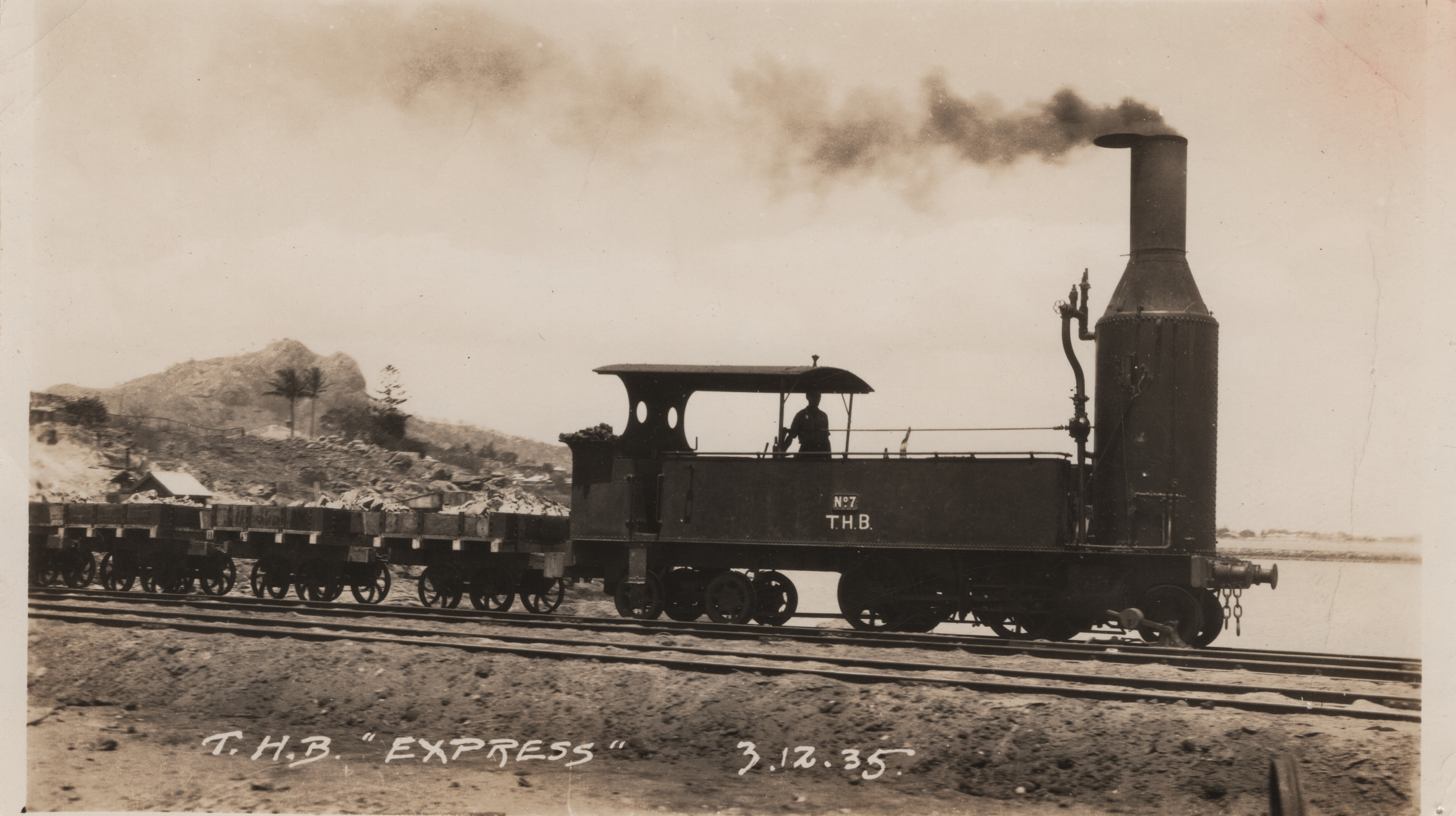
N⁰7 on Townsville Harbour Board Railway 1935

Between 1887 and 1890, four Queensland A10 Neilson class locomotives were rebuilt at the North Ipswich Railway Workshops into 4D10 class tank engines. These conversions featured a 2-4-2T or 2-4-4T wheel arrangement.

Amongst the original A10 locomotives was No. 7, constructed in 1866 by Neilson & Company in Glasgow, Scotland, originally as a 0-4-2 tender engine for the Southern & Western Railway. Notably, No. 7 holds historical significance as the first locomotive to cross the Albert River.

Later in its operational life, the locomotive was adapted for use by the Townsville Harbour Board Railways. To suit the requirements of wharf shunting, it was notably rebuilt as a rare vertical-boiler locomotive which better facilitated slow-speed shunting through tight-radius curves around the Townsville jetty. It remained in service for decades before eventually being written off and scrapped in 1960.

== 20th century ==
Five engines survived the turn of the century although four of them were written off in 1902. N°3 continued in use shunting Bowen Jetty until 1914. It was then stored at North Ipswich Railway Workshops and restored to working order for the Railway Pageant in 1936. Afterwards it was preserved near Countess Street in Roma Street railway yard before being moved to Queen's Park at Ipswich in 1959. In the 1980s it moved to the North Ipswich Railway Workshops.

N°6 was sold to Gibson & Howes in 1896 for use on their Wattawa line. It was reboilered in 1955 and continued to serve the company until 1965 when it was steamed from Bundaberg to Brisbane for the Queensland Railways Centenary Celebrations, operating a reenactment of the first Queensland Railways service from Ipswich to Grandchester. It was retained in operational condition until 1969 when placed on display at the Redbank Locomotive Museum. In 1988, the Australian Railway Historical Society commenced a restoration of the locomotive with it being returned to traffic in May 1991 and today is part the Queensland Rail Heritage Fleet at the Workshops Rail Museum.

== Class list ==
Works number	Southern & Western Railway number	Central Railway number	Queensland Railway number	Year built	Notes
1167	5		5	1865	
1168	4		4	1865	
1169	7		7	1865	converted to 4D10
1170	6		6	1865	preserved at the Workshops Rail Museum
1208			9	1866	converted to 4D10
1209	10		10	1866	converted to 4D10
1210			11	1866	converted to 4D10
1211	12		12	1866	
1212	2	2	2	1866	
1213	13	1	13	1866	
1214	3	3	3	1866	preserved at the Workshops Rail Museum
1215	14	4	14	1866	
1244	8		8	1866	

== Preservation ==
- N°3 has been preserved in Queen's Park, Ipswich, it moved to the North Ipswich Railway Workshops in the 1980s
- N°6 is preserved at the Workshops Rail Museum in working order

== See also ==
- Rail transport in Queensland
- List of Queensland steam locomotives
