= EMD G22 Series =

American export version locomotive

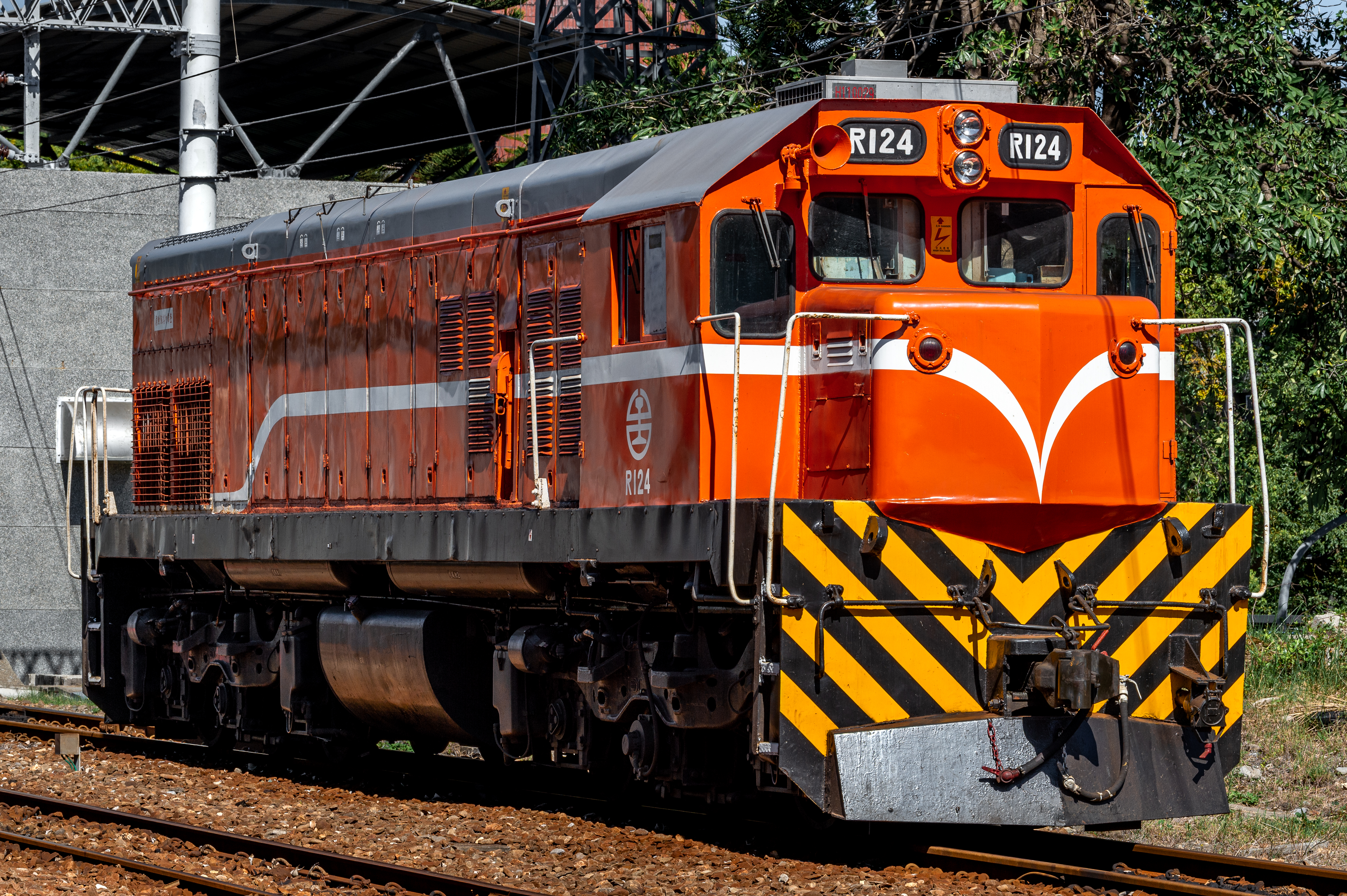
- Taiwan Railway Corporation R124 at Taitung Station.
Type and origin
- Power type: Diesel–electric
- Builder: Various licencees from Electro-Motive Division (see models listed)
- Model: G22
- Build date: January 1967 - November 1991
- Total produced: 746
Specifications
- Configuration
  - AAR: B-B, A1A-A1A, C-C
  - UIC: Bo'Bo', (A1A)(A1A), Co'Co'
- Gauge: 4 ft 8 1/2 in (1,435 mm) standard gauge 3 ft 6 in (1,067 mm); 1,000 mm (3 ft 3 3/8 in) metre gauge
- Driver dia.: 40 in (1,016 mm)
- Wheelbase: 43 ft 6 in (13.26 m) between bolsters; 8 ft (2,438 mm) between axles in each truck
- Length: 46 ft 6 in (14.17 m)) over the coupler pulling faces
- Width: 9 ft 3 in (2.819 m) over the grabirons
- Height: 12 ft 6 15/16 in (3.834 m)
- Loco weight: 71 t (69.9 long tons; 78.3 short tons)
- Fuel capacity: 1,700–2,000 US gal (6,435–7,571 L; 1,416–1,665 imp gal)
- Prime mover: EMD 12-645E
- Engine type: V12 diesel engine
- Aspiration: Roots Blower
- Cylinders: 12
Performance figures
- Maximum speed: 62–93 mph (100–150 km/h)
- Power output: 1,500–1,650 hp (1,119–1,230 kW)
Career
- Nicknames: "Pup” "الجرار الكندي:(The Canadian Locomotive)" (Egypt) "Španka (Spanish woman)" (Yugoslavia).
- Locale: Australia, Brazil, Egypt, Guinea, Iran, Israel, New Zealand, Sweden, Taiwan & Yugoslavia

The EMD G22 Locomotive Series made their debut in 1967 after the rise in popularity of the export EMD G12. Designed to meet most First World, Second World and Third World country requirements, the G22 Series was equipped with a Roots blown EMD 645 Series engine as well as four axle Flexicoil Type-B trucks which carried a low per-axle weight. Based on customer input, the G22 Series was defined by various designations that suited the customer's railway operations.

The standard suffixes applied after the G22 designation were if the customer purchased locomotives with specific traction motors to fit Narrow Gauge (U) or Broad Gauge (W) rails. As the years progressed, the customers began to have more options available for their locomotives including EMD Dash 2 electronics, alternators instead of generators, A1A-A1A running gear and/or steam generators.

The G22 designation could be freely applied to the designs of any EMD export model or a licensee of EMD as long as the electrical and mechanical gear were left unaltered.

== Overview ==
With the introduction of the 645 engine in export models in 1967, the model numbers changed by adding "10". Thus the G12 became the G22. This new model was an upgrade from the 567 series G12 and brought forward various innovations for almost four decades. To this day, the G22 series is the most common diesel found in Brazil, New Zealand and in Egypt.

The G22 Series was one of the first models to be commonly constructed outside of the United States and to have its own separate designation based on traction motors/gauge, generator, etc. Unlike the G12, where its six axle version was the GR12, the six axle version of the G22 Series was designated as G22C. The customer then had options to apply on the locomotive as desired.

Several models were introduced:

- G22W
- G22U
- G22W-AC
- G22W-2

== G22W ==
The G22W first appeared in 1967. To differentiate itself from its predecessor, the G22W was identified by a W suffix to indicate that this model was supplied with traction motors adjustable only for Wide gauged rails (Standard gauge up to 5 ft 6 in / 1,676 mm broad gauge).

The G22W model found success among several buyers and were also built in different countries to suit the customers' needs. One notable difference in the car body design came with the order of Swedish G22Ws. Completely redesigned to meet the Scandinavian weather conditions, these units resembled a G22W only by their internal electrical and mechanical equipment. These were designated SJ T44.

Production lasted from 1967 to 1989.

| | EMD G22W Orders | | | | | | | |
| Image | Builder | Date of Construction | Country | Railway | Quantity | Class | Road numbers | Notes |
|---|---|---|---|---|---|---|---|---|
| | Electro-Motive Division | July 1967 | South Korea | Korea National Railroad | 22 | | 4201 – 4222 | |
| | Electro-Motive Division | May 1970 | Guinea | Chemin de Fer Boké | 3 | | 001 – 003 | The first EMD locomotives for Chemin de Fer Boké |
| | Electro-Motive Division | January - March 1977 | Egypt | Egyptian National Railways | 32 | | 3801 – 3832 | |
| | Electro-Motive Division & Đuro Đaković | February 1975, August 1975, January - November 1982 | Iran | Islamic Republic of Iran Railways | 41 | 40 | 40.138 – 40.158, 40.159 – 40.178 | 40.138 served first as demonstrator; 40.159 – 40.178 were constructed by Đuro Đaković |
| | Kalmar Verkstad AB | (Month Unknown) 1989 | Israel | Rakevet Israel | 1 | T | T40100 | |
| | Nydqvist & Holm AB & Kalmar Verkstad AB | January 1969 - June 1970, September 1970 - June 1971, August 1975 - October 1977, February - December 1980, January 1983 - March 1987 | Sweden | Statens Järnvägar | 123 | SJ T44 | 259 – 283, 314 – 323, 329 – 416 | 259 - 283, 314 - 323 Built by NOHAB; 329 - 416 Built by Kalmar |

== G22U ==
The G22U appeared alongside its wide gauge counterpart in 1969. To separate itself from its predecessor G12 as well as the G22W, the G22U was identified by a U suffix to indicate that this model was supplied with traction motors adjustable to any rail gauge Universally (Metre Gauge up to Irish Gauge).

The G22U model found success among several buyers and were also built in different countries to suit the customers needs. The Yugoslav locomotives were equipped with a steam generator located in the high short hood. Both the Yugoslav Railways and Taiwan Railroad Administration purchased their G22Us with a unique A-1-A running gear configuration. This did not alter the models designation as the centre axles were not powered nor were A-1-A trucks widely produced at the time.

This locomotive found itself to be very successful in the metre gauge lines of Brazil, as most lines did not permit the use of six-axle locomotives around tight curves.

Production spanned from 1969 to 1974.

| | EMD G22U Orders | | | | | | | |
| Image | Builder | Date of Construction | Country | Railway | Quantity | Class | Road numbers | Notes |
|---|---|---|---|---|---|---|---|---|
| | Material y Construcciones S.A. | January - October 1971, July 1972 - February 1973 | Brazil | Rede de Viação Paraná-Santa Catarina (RFFSA) | 100 | | 1501 – 1576, 1607 – 1630 | Purchased during the Brazilian Miracle era |
| | Material y Construcciones S.A. | January - May 1972 | Brazil | Viação Férrea do Rio Grande do Sul (RFFSA) | 30 | | 1577 – 1606 | Purchased during the Brazilian Miracle era |
| | Electro-Motive Division | September - November 1969 | Taiwan | Taiwan Railway Administration | 39 | R100 | R101 – R139 | G22A |
| | Material y Construcciones S.A. | June 1973 - January 1974 | Yugoslavia | Jugoslavenske Željeznice | 25 | Series 644 | 644.001 – 644.025 | JZ series 644 The only Yugoslav locomotives built from MACOSA |
| | Clyde Engineering | 1967 | Australia | Western Australian Government Railways | 5 | AA Class | AA1515-AA1519 | EMD G22CU |
| | Clyde Engineering | 1969 | Australia | Western Australian Government Railways | 6 | AB Class | AB1531-AB1536 | EMD G22CU |
| | General Motors Canada, Clyde Engineering & Hutt Workshops | 1978-1981 | New Zealand | KiwiRail | 85 | DC Class | DC4006-DC4951 | EMD G22AUR |

== G22W-AC ==
The G22W-AC first appeared in 1980. Compared to the base model G22, the G22W-AC added an AC suffix to indicate the use of an AC alternator generating Alternating Current, improving reliability compared to the previous DC generator. Output from the alternator was then rectified back to Direct Current for the traction motors. The G22W-AC came equipped with 4x EMD D77 traction motors, which were designed for Wide gauged rails (Standard Gauge up to Irish Gauge).

Production spanned from 1980 to 1991.

| | EMD G22W-AC Orders | | | | | | |
| Image | Builder | Date of Construction | Country | Railway | Quantity | Road numbers | Notes |
|---|---|---|---|---|---|---|---|
| | General Motors Diesel Division | January - March 1980, July - August 1981, December 1981, March - April 1982, August - November 1982 | Egypt | Egyptian National Railways | 228 | 3833 – 3999, 33601 – 33661 | Mostly used for passenger service on suburban lines, the 336xx series was renumbered to 36xx (3601–3661) |
| | Astilleros Argentinos Río de La Plata S.A. | March 1991 | Iran | Ahwaz Steel | 3 | Unknown | |

== G22W-2 ==
The G22W-2 first appeared in 1991. Compared to the base model G22, the G22W-2 was identified by a -2 suffix to indicate the use of Dash-2 modular electronics (which included the use of the AC alternator used on the G22W-AC). The traction motors were adjustable for Wide gauged rails (Standard Gauge up to Irish Gauge). The updated electronics improved availability, efficiency and ease of maintenance of the locomotive.

EMD G22W-2 Orders
| Builder | Date of Construction | Country | Railway | Quantity | Road numbers | Notes |
|---|---|---|---|---|---|---|
| Astilleros Argentinos Río de La Plata S.A. | November 1991 | Iran | Ahwaz Steel | 3 | Unknown | The last of the G22 Series |

== Phasing ==
Only two general variations have been noticed during the G22 production, most notably on the constant production of the RFFSA G22Us.

- Phase 1: Larger frame sill, air reservoir slung under skirting.
- Phase 2: Smaller frame sill, air reservoir exposed, and two horizontal bars along intake grilles.

There have been various as-modifications on railroads as well, but are excluded due to various degrees of completion on the modification.

== See also ==
- Astarsa
- Brazilian Miracle
- EMD G22CU
- List of GMD Locomotives
- List of GM-EMD locomotives
- RFFSA
