= EMD G22CU =

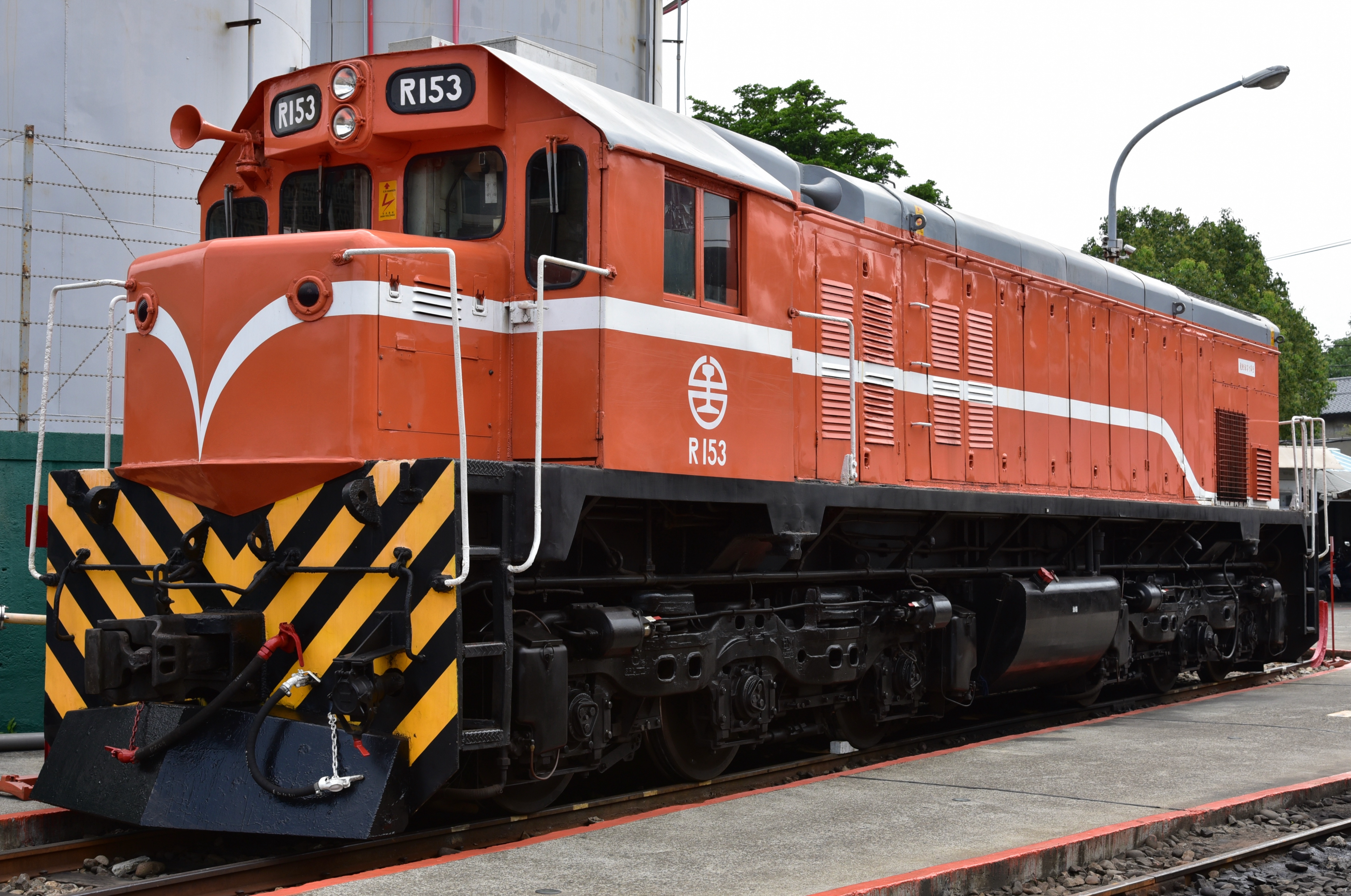
- G22CU used by the Taiwan Railways Administration
Type and origin
- Power type: Diesel–electric
- Builder: GM Electro-Motive Division. Under license (different G22 versions): Astarsa (Argentina), Đuro Đaković (Yugoslavia), Henschel & Son (Germany), MACOSA (Spain), NOHAB (Sweden), Villares (Brazil)
- Build date: 1970s
Specifications
- Configuration
  - AAR: C-C
- Gauge: 1,000 mm, 3 ft 6 in (1,067 mm)
- Length: 15.506 m (50 ft 10.5 in); Brazilians:15.970 m
- Width: 2.8 m (9 ft 2 in)
- Height: 3.772 m (12 ft 4.5 in)
- Axle load: 15.333 t
- Loco weight: 92 tonnes (90.5 long tons; 101 short tons)
- Fuel capacity: 3,080 litres (680 imp gal; 810 US gal)
- Prime mover: EMD 12-645
Performance figures
- Maximum speed: 105 km/h (65 mph)

The EMD G22CU is a metre gauge diesel–electric locomotive designed and built by the Electro-Motive Division of General Motors. It was manufactured by several licensees, and exported to many countries including Argentina, Australia, Brazil, Egypt, Iran, New Zealand, Nigeria, Pakistan, South Korea, Yugoslavia and Taiwan (ROC) (countries with more than 20 units).

== Overview ==
G22 locomotives were first built in 1967 with the export markets in mind. For that reason they carried a low per-axle weight. The CU version sports a C-C traction motors configuration, and 1-meter gauge. Its main engine is an EMD 12-645. They were produced at the General Motor's Electro-Motive Diesel plants at La Grange and London -Canada-, as well at plants -under license- in other countries, including Argentina and Spain.

== Argentina ==
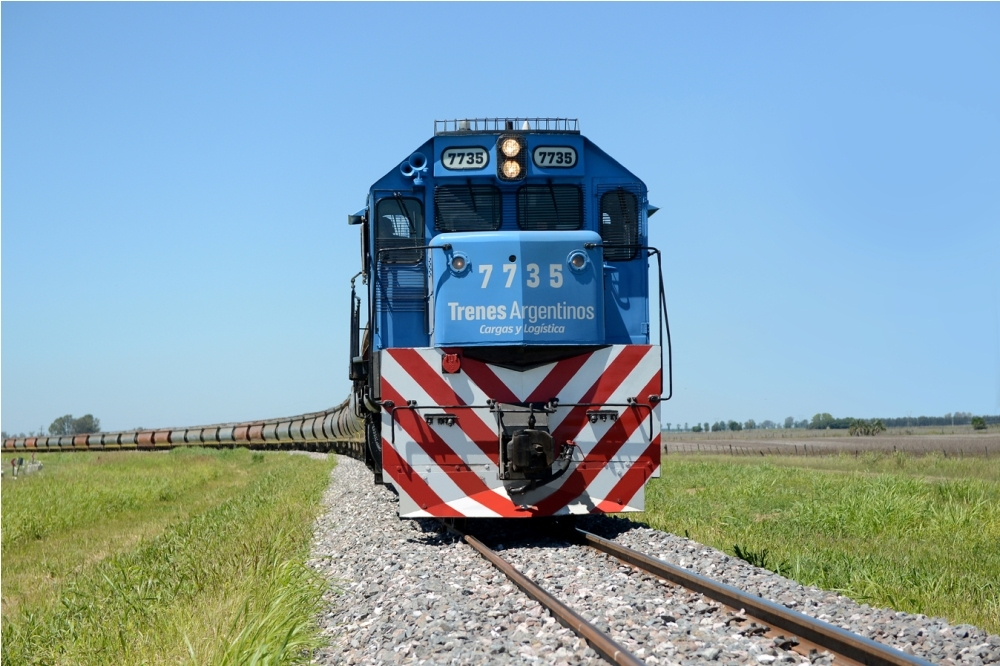
A TACyL locomotive on the General Belgrano Railway

In 1972 Ferrocarriles Argentinos bought 250 locomotives from Electro Motive Division of General Motors, including G22 and GT22 models. 96 of them where delivered to the Ferrocarril Belgrano line, so they were the CU version, adapted to its 1-meter gauge. Belgrano Norte line received 20 built at La Grange, while Belgrano Sur line received 5 produced at London -Canada-. The remaining ones were built by Astarsa at San Fernando, Buenos Aires.

At first they were assigned to the suburban passenger service in Buenos Aires. Afterwards many of them were sent to the northern part of the country, where they ran services among several cities including Salta, Resistencia, Embarcación, Formosa and Tucumán. When Ferrocarriles Argentinos was dismembered and privatised at the beginning of the 1990s, these locomotives were handed over to several different companies including Ferrovías (Buenos Aires northern local line), Metropolitano (Buenos Aires southern local line, then taken by UGOFE) and Belgrano Cargas (long-distance freight service).

As of 2015 many of them are still in service for Belgrano Norte and Belgrano Sur lines and State-owned freight company, Belgrano Cargas.

== Brazil ==
The Brazilian railways company, RFFSA, acquired 24 G22CUs -produced in Spain by Materiales y Construcciones SA under license- in 1971. They were put in service at the Division #13 Rio Grande do Sul, serving the states of Paraná, Santa Catarina and Rio Grande do Sul. Due to RFFSA privatisation 21 of the locomotives (the others were already retired) where transferred to Ferrovia Sul Atlântico SA, which afterwards became part of ALL.

== Taiwan ==
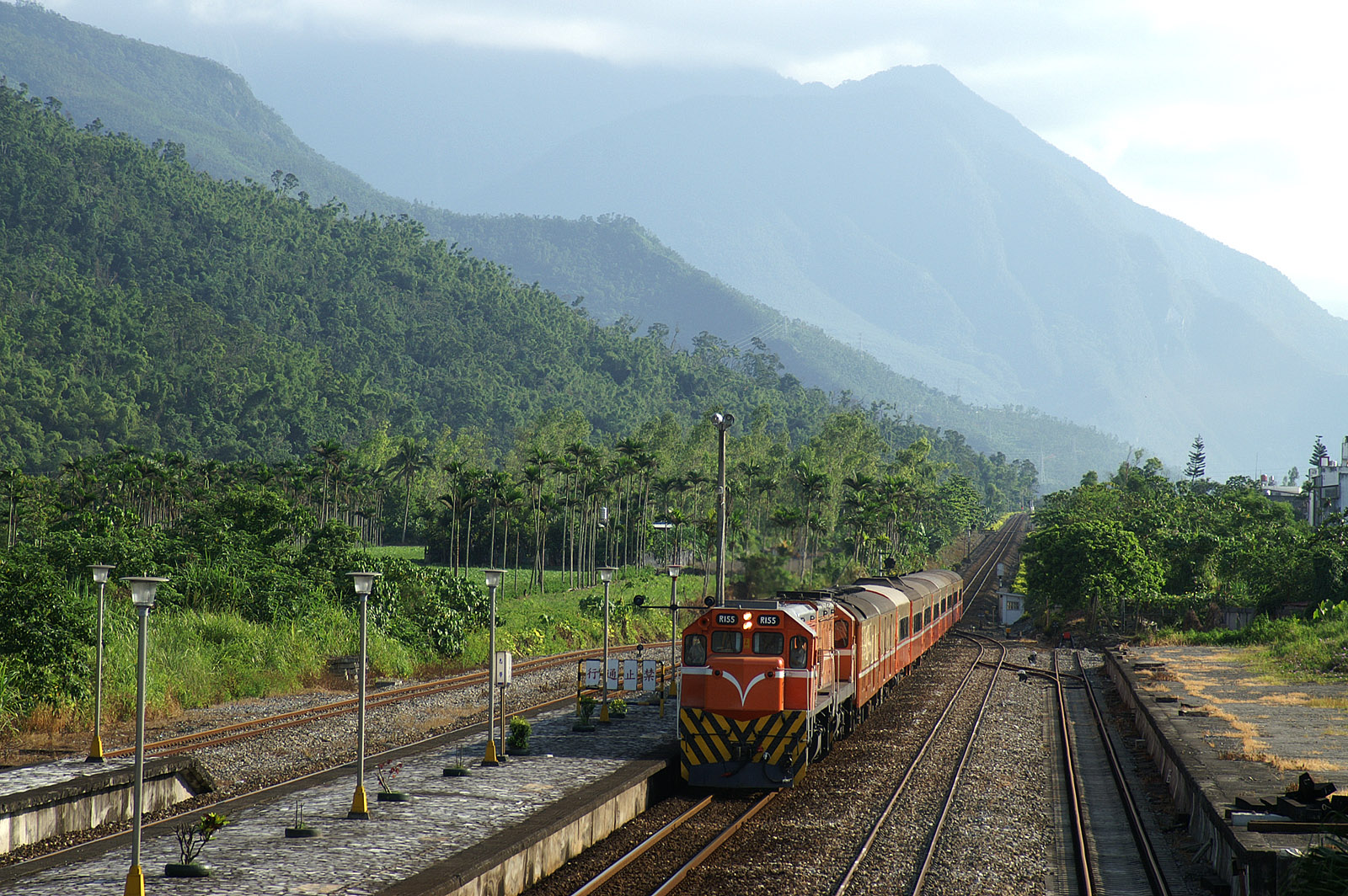
R155-hauled Chukuang Express (train number 67) in Zhixue, Hualien

In order to improve the hauling efficacy, Taiwan Railway Administration bought 20 G22CU from GM-EMD IN 1973. They were named the "R150" series and numbered from R151 to R170 (EMD serial: 712755-712764 and 713120-713129). All the R150 series arrived Taiwan between 1973 and 1974. In 1982, five more G22CU (R171-R175, EMD serial: 818016-1 to 818016-5) were purchased. Currently, their main arena is the East-Trunk Line (東部幹線, from Badu Station to Taitung Station, including the Yilan Line, North-Link Line, and Taitung Line).

One of the locomotives, R164, was removed from service after an accident in 2001.

== Related locomotives ==
These locomotives are very similar to G22CW, which are standard or broad gauge, and to GM GT22 Series, which are turbocharged.

== See also ==
- List of GM-EMD locomotives
