= Astarsa =

Argentine shipyard

Coordinates: 34°25′26″S 58°33′46″W

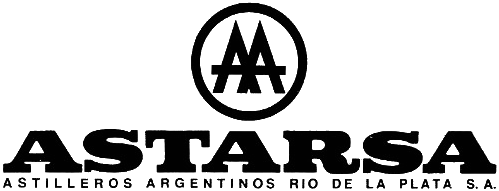

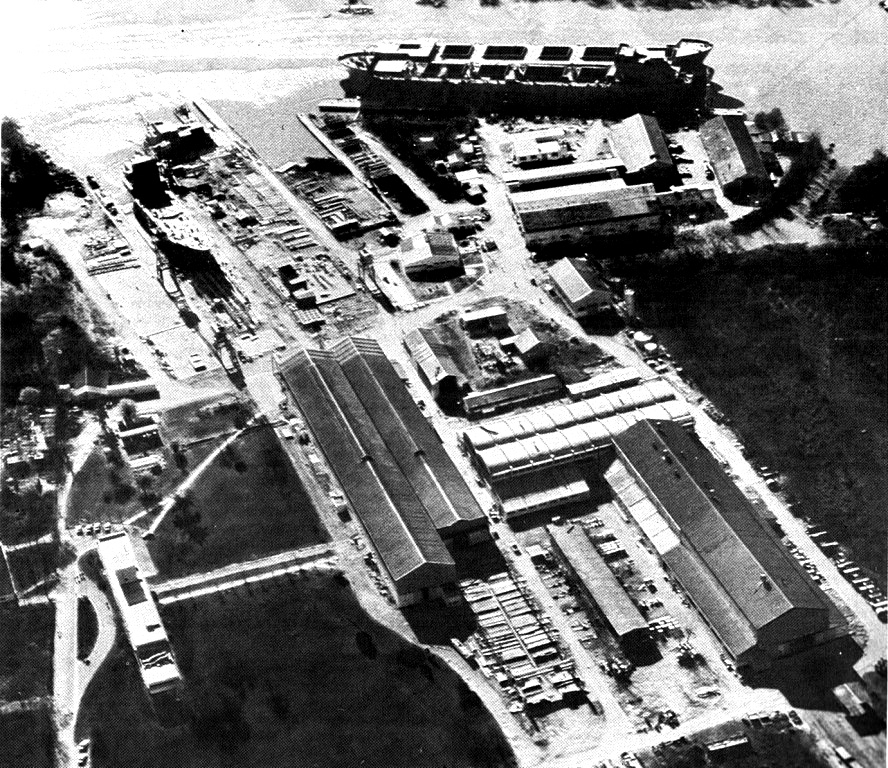
- Aerial view of the factory (1967)
- Company type: S.A.
- Industry: Civil Engineering; Transport
- Founded: 1927
- Defunct: 1994; 32 years ago
- Headquarters: Tigre, Buenos Aires, Argentina
- Products: Locomotives; Ships
- Number of employees: 1,500 (1972)

Astilleros Argentinos Río de La Plata S.A. (mostly known for its acronym ASTARSA, which can be roughly translated as Argentine Shipyards of Río de la Plata) was an Argentine shipyard. Its core business was building and repairing ships and locomotives. It also manufactured pipes, industrial machinery, and tractors. It went out of business in 1994.

== History ==
In the 1920s the Sociedad Colectiva Hansen y Puccini, predecessor of Astarsa, was founded. The first ship over 1000 tons launched in Argentina was built by Astarsa for Yacimientos Petrolíferos Fiscales (YPF).

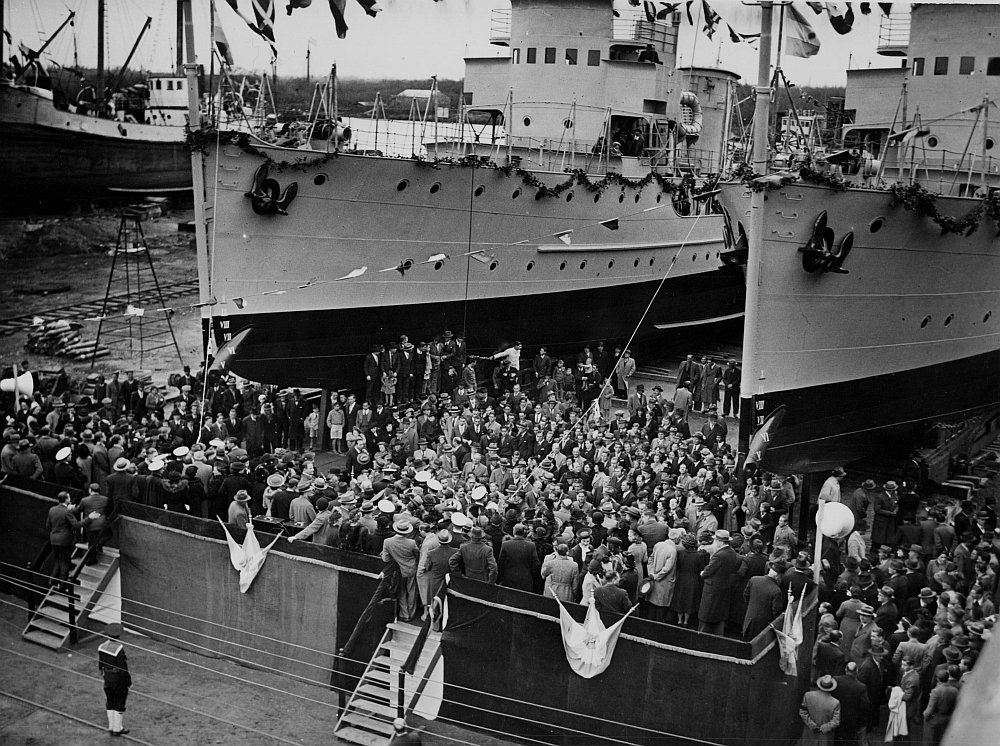
Ships being launched at Astarsa (1938)

The shipyard was located in the city of Tigre, north of Greater Buenos Aires, on the Luján River. It had a peak of 1,500 naval and metallurgic workers.

Although Astarsa's main line of business was shipbuilding, the company also acted as sub-contractor for several railway manufacturers, producing and repairing diesel locomotives for EMD, Werkspoor and Alsthom, in addition to doing major repairs to diesel and steam locomotives for state-owned railway company Ferrocarriles Argentinos. Between 1976 and 1991 Astarsa manufactured 267 locomotives under General Motors license for the Argentine market, also exporting models to South Africa and Saudi Arabia.

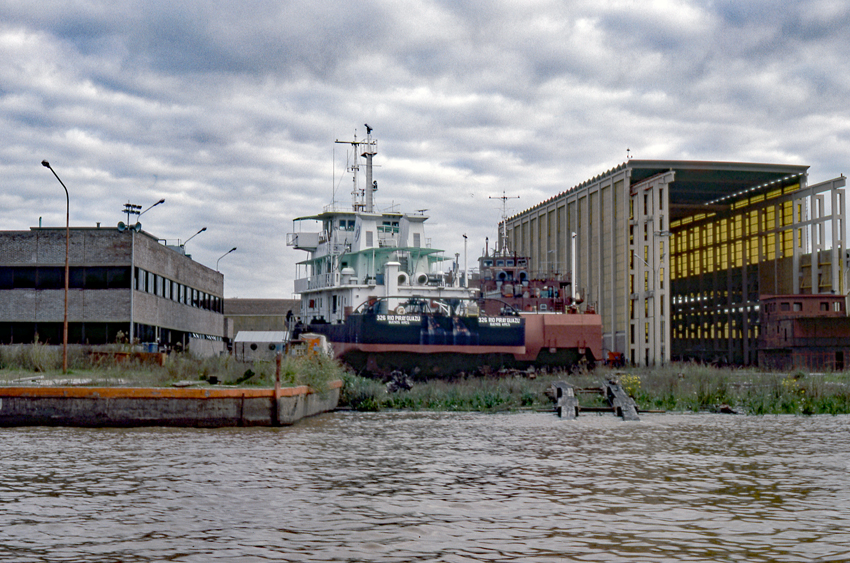
Pusher tug on slipway at Astarsa shipyard, 1981

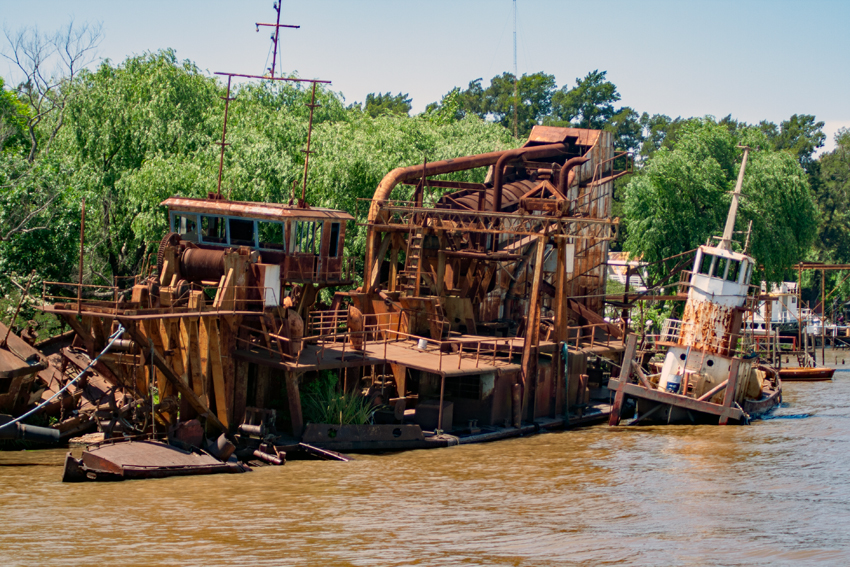
Abandoned shipyard

In the early 1970s, Astarsa produced industrial machinery under licence from the American company Caterpillar. During the 1970s, Astarsa workers spoke out against frequent accidents in the factory which had caused several deaths, and ended up going on strike in 1973. On 24 March 1976, when the military dictatorship headed by Jorge Videla overthrew the government of Isabel Perón, the Argentine Army took the Astarsa factory and other shipyards in the area, kidnapping 60 workers, 16 of whom are still missing.

The decreasing activity of the Argentine merchant navy since the 1980s and the privatisation process started in the 1990s were some of the causes that led Astarsa to close down. In 1994 the company ceased operations, abandoning locomotives (new and under repair) within its shop. By 1997, the company declared bankruptcy and the factory was in the process of being sold by 2000.

== See also ==
- List of shipyards of Argentina
- Transport in Argentina
- Rail transport in Argentina

== Bibliography ==
- "Complicidad patronal-militar en la última dictadura argentina: Los casos de Acindar, Astarsa, Dálmine Siderca, Ford, Ledesma y Mercedes Benz" by Verónica Basualdo, article published in Engranajes magazine n° 5, March 2006
- La industria naval en la Argentina. Buenos Aires: Ministerio de Industria Centro de Estudios para la Producción (2005)
- La industria naval en la Argentina by Aurelio González Climent - Buenos Aires: Universidad de Buenos Aires, pp. 68–72 (1956)
- "Pensar los setenta desde los trabajadores" by Federico Lorenz - Políticas de la memoria, pag. 19-23 (2004)
- "Los trabajadores navales de Tigre. La militancia sindical en un contexto de enfrentamiento militar". Lucha Armada en la Argentina n° 2, pag. 72-87 (2005)
