= Redbank Railway Workshops =

Coordinates: 27.5949°S 152.8735°E

Redbank Railway Workshops are workshops for the repair and heavy maintenance of locomotives and rolling stock for Aurizon, located in Redbank, City of Ipswich, Queensland, Australia.

== History ==
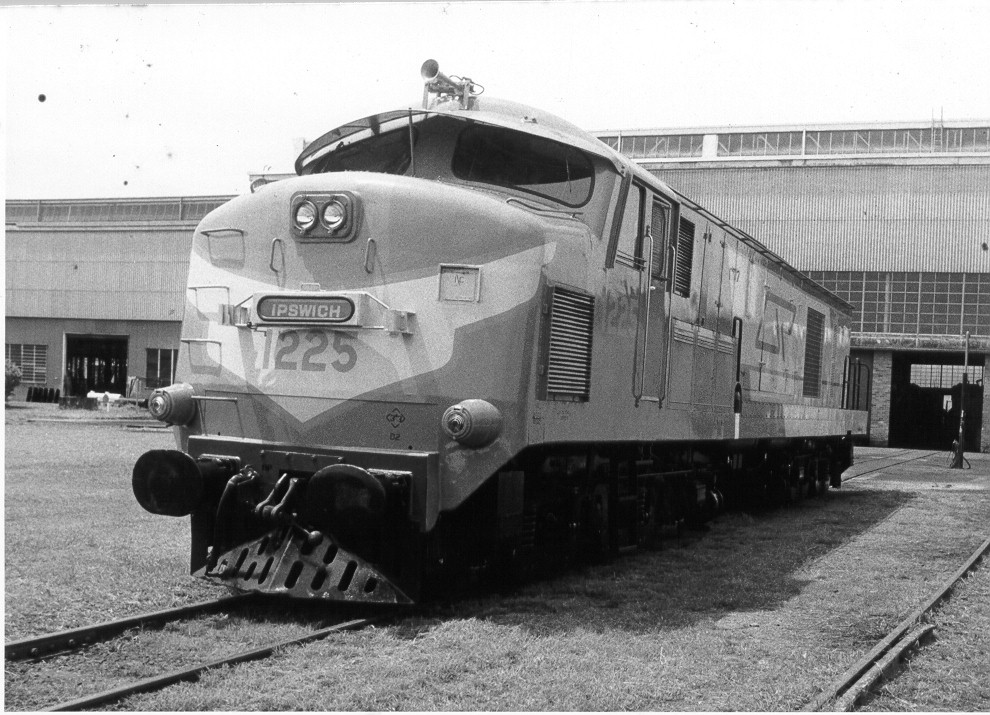
1225 outside the workshops

With the North Ipswich Railway Workshops becoming increasingly cramped, in July 1958, Queensland Railways opened a new workshop facility in Redbank to maintain its new diesel locomotive fleet. However, it would be 25 years before all the functions were transferred from Ipswich.

The workshops perform heavy maintenance on Aurizon's locomotive and wagon fleet. It also has a contract to maintain rolling stock for Queensland Rail.

In May 2014, Aurizon announced that it would cease maintaining Queensland Rail rolling stock at Redbank, with the workshops to close by 2017. In November 2014, the site was sold to the Goodman Group who leased it back to Aurizon.

In 2016, as part of a contract to outsource Aurizon's rolling stock maintenance to Progress Rail Services, it was announced that the workshops would remain open.

As of late 2018, Queensland Rail no longer maintains their city network there, having relocated to North Ipswich Railway Workshops

== Locomotive Museum ==
In February 1970 the Redbank Locomotive Museum opened as an open air museum with 13 members of the Queensland Rail Heritage Fleet (2, 6, 48, 106, 221A, 290, 444, 700, 771, 1000, 1009, 1051 and 1089) on display. It closed in 1992 with the locomotives transferred to the North Ipswich Railway Workshops.

== See also ==
- Rail transport in Queensland
