= Black wattle =

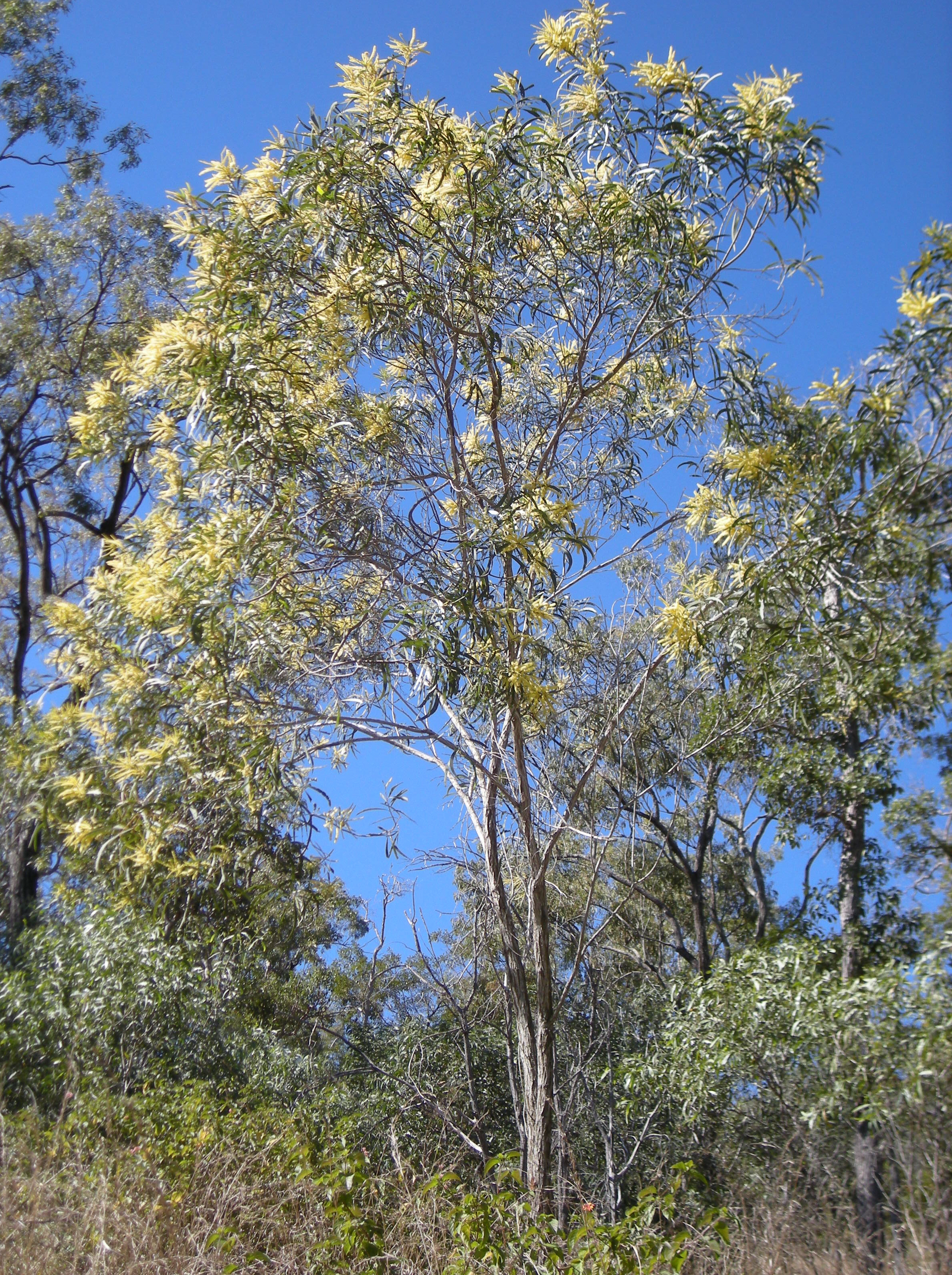
An Acacia aulacocarpa tree.

Black wattle is the common name for a number of species of trees that are native to Australia, as listed below:

- Acacia aulacocarpa
- Acacia auriculiformis, also known as Darwin black wattle or northern black wattle;
- Acacia concurrens
- Acacia crassicarpa
- Acacia decurrens, also known as early black wattle
- Acacia hakeoides, also known as western black wattle
- Acacia implexa
- Acacia leiocalyx, also known as early-flowering black wattle
- Acacia mabellae
- Acacia mangium
- Acacia mearnsii, also known as late black wattle and the species of tree that is known to be, commercially, the most important tannin producer in Southern Africa
- Acacia melanoxylon, a 'timber' tree that is commonly known as Australian Blackwood
- Acacia neriifolia
- Acacia plectocarpa
- Acacia salicina
- Acacia stenophylla

It may also refer to Callicoma serratifolia, a tall shrub or tree which is also found in Australia.
