= Brown salwood =

Brown salwood is a common name for several plants and may refer to:

- Acacia aulacocarpa
- Acacia crassicarpa
