= Monochelus litigiosus =

Scientific classification
- Kingdom: Animalia
- Phylum: Arthropoda
- Class: Insecta
- Order: Coleoptera
- Suborder: Polyphaga
- Infraorder: Scarabaeiformia
- Family: Scarabaeidae
- Genus: Monochelus
- Species: M. litigiosus

Binomial name
- Monochelus litigiosus Péringuey, 1902

Species of beetle

Monochelus litigiosus is a species of beetle of the family Scarabaeidae. It is found in South Africa (KwaZulu-Natal).

== Description ==
Adults reach a length of about 7–7.5 mm (0.28–0.30 in). Males are very similar to Monochelus laetus, from which it differs by the uninterrupted squamose covering and the shape of the hind femora. Instead of having a denuded lateral patch and a band alongside the median groove on each side of the pronotum, this part of the body is entirely covered with greyish-white scales. The brownish-red elytra are also covered with dense, although not contiguous, scales that are not forming longitudinal bands. Females are similar to males. They can be differentiated from the females of M. laetus by the absence of longitudinal bands of scales on the elytra.
