= Monochelus princeps =

Scientific classification
- Kingdom: Animalia
- Phylum: Arthropoda
- Class: Insecta
- Order: Coleoptera
- Suborder: Polyphaga
- Infraorder: Scarabaeiformia
- Family: Scarabaeidae
- Genus: Monochelus
- Species: M. princeps

Binomial name
- Monochelus princeps Péringuey, 1902

Species of beetle

Monochelus princeps is a species of beetle of the family Scarabaeidae. It is found in South Africa (KwaZulu-Natal).

== Description ==
Adults reach a length of about 6–7 mm (0.24–0.28 in). Males are similar in general appearance to Monochelus laetus, with the shape and vestiture of the head also similar. The pronotum has the median groove filled with flavescent scales, the outer margins, including the basal one, have a broad band of similar scales, and on each side of the groove there is a short band reaching from the apex to about the median discoidal part. The scutellum is scaly and on each elytron there are three bands of scales divided by two slight costae. The propygidium, sides of the abdomen, and pectus are densely scaly, and the pygidium has only some remote, hair-like appressed scales. Females are similar to males and have the yellow scales also similarly arranged, but the pygidium is a little less densely scaly.
