= Monochelus pruinosus =

Scientific classification
- Kingdom: Animalia
- Phylum: Arthropoda
- Class: Insecta
- Order: Coleoptera
- Suborder: Polyphaga
- Infraorder: Scarabaeiformia
- Family: Scarabaeidae
- Genus: Monochelus
- Species: M. pruinosus

Binomial name
- Monochelus pruinosus Burmeister, 1844

Species of beetle

Monochelus pruinosus is a species of beetle of the family Scarabaeidae. It is found in South Africa (Cape).

== Description ==
Adults reach a length of about 7 mm (0.28 in). They are chocolate-brown, a little darker on the pronotum than on the rest of the body, sparingly sprinkled above and beneath with slightly elongated white scales. The head and pronotum are similar in shape to that of Monochelus formosus, but the latter is not so deeply or closely scabroso-punctate. The elytra are similar, but the shape of the hind tibiae is very different.
