= Second Innisfail Court House =

Interwar Australian historic building in Innisfail, Queensland

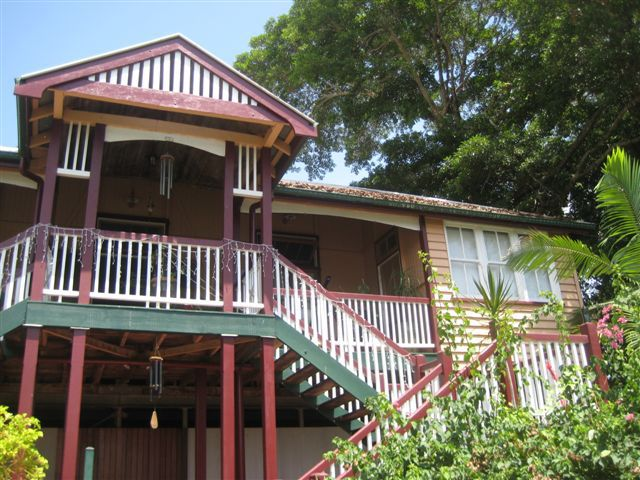
- Second Innisfail Court House relocated to Yorkeys Knob, 2008

- Location within Queensland Location within Australia
- 16.8029°S 145.7193°E
- Location: 40 Buckley Street, Yorkeys Knob, Cairns Region, Queensland, Australia

History
- Design period: 1919–1930s (interwar period)
- Built: 1920–1930s

Site notes
- Architect: Department of Public Works (Queensland)
- Architectural style: Classicism

Queensland Heritage Register
- Official name: Innisfail Court House (former), Innisfail Police Station (former)
- Type: state heritage (built)
- Designated: 6 December 2004
- Reference no.: 602500
- Significant components: roof/ridge ventilator/s / fleche/s, court house, ventilation system

The Second Innisfail Court House is a heritage-listed former court house and police station in Innisfail, Cassowary Coast Region, Queensland, Australia, which was subsequently relocated and used as a private residence at 40 Buckley Street, Yorkeys Knob, Cairns Region, Queensland, Australia. It was designed by Department of Public Works (Queensland) and built from 1920 to 1930s. It is also known as the former Innisfail Police Station. It was added to the Queensland Heritage Register on 6 December 2004.

== History ==
The second Innisfail Court House at 40 Buckley Street, Yorkeys Knob is a high-set timber building originally constructed in 1920–1921 as a court house and government offices on the corner of Rankine and Edith Streets, Innisfail. In 1938 the building was moved a short distance to a site in Edith Street, Innisfail. With the third and present Innisfail Court House (built of rendered brick in interwar-classical style) opening in 1940, the timber building was converted to the Innisfail Police Station in 1942. The building was purchased by private owners in 1988, moved to its present location at Yorkeys Knob and adapted for use as a private residence.

The Johnstone River area was settled by cedar-cutters, with the first major planting of sugar cane occurring in 1880 by TH Fitzgerald. In 1881 the first sugar mill was erected in the area and a town was laid out at the junctions of the North and South Johnstone Rivers. The town was named Geraldton in 1883, although in 1910 it was changed to Innisfail to avoid confusion with the Western Australian town of the same name.

The town's first official building, described by Dorothy Jones as a "long low iron structure" was erected c. 1881, probably on the police reserve, and accommodated a police station, court house, unofficial post office, lands office, customs office, an office for the Clerk of Petty Sessions and a gaol. Tenders for a second court house were called in late 1887, and a timber building was built on the corner of the police reserve bounded by Edith and Rankine Streets. By the late 1900s-early 1910s the Innisfail district was attracting attention from both land speculators and settlers, with a particular focus on sugar production. The Queensland Government expressed its intention of opening up Mourilyan Harbour and of resuming, and extending the local tramline inland from the coast, which gave further impetus to development of the district as a sugar production area.

It was normal practice in colonial days for country and regional court houses to be built of timber, often with corrugated iron elements. These buildings were usually single story and unassuming, consisting of little more than two or three rooms arranged longitudinally and surrounded by verandahs on at least three sides. Surviving examples from this period in the tropics include Port Douglas Court House(1879) and Croydon Court House (1887). The 1888 timber court house in Innisfail suffered considerable damage in the devastating cyclone of 1918, which destroyed an estimated 75% of Innisfail's buildings. It was replaced in 1920–1921 with a timber building on high stumps with an iron roof and 8-foot (2.4 m) wide verandahs at front and sides. The 35-by-25-foot (10.7 m × 7.6 m) courtroom at the rear was detached from the front portion of the building by a 5-foot (1.5 m) passage. The building also housed offices for various government departments as well as shops.

In the design of Colonial and State Government buildings in Queensland, there is considerable continuity, particularly in the use of timber as the predominant material, and in details of composition. Some of the design details in common use in government buildings, particularly from the mid-1880s onwards, are window hoods, eaves details, gable decorations, verandah balustrades and roof vents. While many of these elements including timber composition were common to many buildings in Queensland from early on, government buildings such as court houses, post offices, schools, and police stations for example, can be distinguished from the common mode by the high standard of architectural composition, the careful detailing, and the attention to climate - as evidenced in the use of sun shading devices, ventilation systems, and the overhang of eaves beyond the verandah edges.

Many buildings constructed in Innisfail after the 1918 cyclone, demonstrate particular adaptations to cyclonic conditions. That many destroyed timber structures were re-built in reinforced concrete, masonry or rendered to offer some protection from the elements, poses historic inquiry of the 1920–1921 timber court house. It is notable that at least one of the alternative schemes for the new court house featured plans of a grand two-story masonry structure in inter-war free classical style. Indeed, court house architecture of the time set out to impress and awe the unfortunate citizens who were unlucky enough to be involved in the process of the law. As a result, most surviving examples from the 20th century are more permanent and refined masonry structures such as the Cairns Court House (1921) and the Dalby Court House (1930s). Even in small country towns it was common for second-generation court houses to be built this way, replacing an earlier and more basic timber building. The reasons for constructing the court house, a symbolically important building, out of timber at this time, may reflect availability of materials as well as economic factors, although further research could enlighten this debate.

Adaptations used in the construction of the Innisfail court house however, include the use of steel bolts to anchor the roof to the walls, and the walls to the floor beams, which were in turn bolted to the stumps. Diagonal crossbeams of hardwood timber were used to brace the walls of the building. These elements are thought to be early adaptations of construction methods to cyclonic conditions.

By 1932 some of the verandah space of the building was sacrificed for rooms, including the Police Magistrate and a jury room. The front section of the building was lengthened by 8 feet (2.4 m) in 1933 to incorporate a Lands Office and Land Ranger's Office, and the rear of the courtroom extended 8 feet (2.4 m) to add a verandah flanked by 2 storerooms. Then Assistant Chief Architect of the Queensland Government Harold James Parr drafted the alterations. Electricity, water and septic toilets were installed in 1933.

The vast majority of timber buildings built in North Queensland have traditionally relied on use of elevation, verandahs, and cross ventilation from windows to keep them cool. More elaborate conventions included regulating fanlights, ceiling vents and louvered openings on both sides of the roof or in gable ends. The second Innisfail court house incorporates these more common ventilation features with more advanced techniques. Plans and sections showing extensions to the building in 1933 reveal an elaborate ventilation system to cope with Innisfail's hot and humid climate. The system featured latticed ventilation spaces in the ceiling that delivered hot air into pipes in the ceiling and out through a cupola-shaped ventilation fleche in a decorative casing on the court house roof. Although not in use since the building's removal from Innisfail in 1988, the necessary elements of the ventilation system are still present in the ceiling. Bell (1984:178) confirms that intact examples of ceiling ventilation such as this are rare, as many have been removed or destroyed during installation of electric lights or ceiling fans. At floor level in the courtroom the lowest wallboards were hinged so they could be opened to increase airflow. Fanlights, sash windows and louvres assisted with ventilation. In 1934 a ventilation grille was installed behind the Judge's Bench and casement windows installed in the Jury's Room. Although electric fans were first installed in 1938, and by 1990 there were 18 fans in the building, these upgrades have not affected the material fabric of the system.

While it is known that similar ventilation techniques were incorporated into other public buildings such as schools and post offices or other court houses during this period and earlier, the system within the second Innisfail court house now at Yorkeys Knob is rare in its survival in North Queensland. In all, the building has seven ceiling ventilation spaces attached to the ducting system and roof ventilator via metal hoods in the ceiling above them. This configuration is preserved intact and remains in the ceiling space.

Between 1920 and 1930 the total population of the Johnstone Shire ballooned from 5,549 to 18,088 people and the number of recorded dwellings rose from 700 to 3,130. The sugar districts of the north Queensland coast experienced a boom during the 1930s and it was considered necessary to expand the court house facilities in Innisfail to cope with the increasing amounts of official and legal business. In 1937 plans were drawn up for a new 2-storey brick court house, which was completed in 1939.

Timber and iron buildings are well adapted for removal and modification for re-use, and in north Queensland this has been a common response to changing economic conditions in settlements, such as mining towns. Bell considers that this was probably one of the influences on the design of timber buildings, and that it was not unusual for relocated buildings to undergo modification on re- erection, for stylistic or functional reasons, rather than be reconstructed to original forms.

The timber court house was moved to an excavated site at 8 Edith Street in 1938, placed on concrete stumps and adapted for use as the Innisfail Police Station, which opened in 1942. The front offices became a Day Room, CIB office, storeroom, Sub-Inspector's office and public enquiry rooms. One corner of the verandah was enclosed for a Senior Sergeant's office. The courtroom was divided into single men's accommodation, with 6 bedrooms and a recreation room. The front double stairway was lengthened and one set of steps was removed to facilitate car parking underneath the building. The room partitions were constructed from fibro cement and the side verandahs were screened with lattice.

Other changes to the building that occurred when it was used as a police station include the installation of a fibrous cement partition between the Public Office and the Enquiries Room (which subsequently become a Radio Room), removal of a partition between the storeroom and Sub-Inspector's office and its replacement with a high arch partition, enclosure of the back verandah of the court room for use as 3 offices, and installation of a toilet on the side of the courtroom building. Several of the casement windows were replaced with louvres and most of the verandahs were enclosed.

A carpark was proposed for the site of the police station in 1988, and the building was purchased by Frank Fisher and Bea Masschelein for relocation as a private residence. It was moved to its present location at Buckley Street, Yorkeys Knob, on the northern beaches of Cairns. The front section of the building was sawn in half to facilitate removal, while the courtroom was removed in one piece. To fit the building on its new block, the arrangement of its two sections has been altered. The courtroom was placed to the eastern rear of the block (to the right of its original position) and joined to the front section by a verandah at the front and rear.

The architectural elements of the building combine grand scale "Queenslander" features and traditional court house architecture. While there are limited associations with government or justice in its current location, the building has become an important element of the streetscape of Buckley Street, overlooking the Yorkeys Knob Marina and Boat Club. Aesthetic features that can be appreciated from the street include the dominant use of timber as a construction material, pyramid shaped corrugated iron roof and the elaborate ventilation fleche and casing of the court room, pattern of 4 panel sash windows and vertically framed frenchlights, encircling verandahs, symmetrical double-elbow shaped front stairs, verandah entrance highlighted as a frontispiece by paired posts and gable pediment, slat balustrading, high set frame, large scale and its siting above street level.

Since its use as a private residence the building has undergone work to restore its original character, such as re-instatement of the front double steps and removal of the verandah enclosures. Internally some changes have been made for functional reasons, including construction of a kitchen in the former CIB office with a skylight in place of the original ventilation opening, construction of a bathroom in the former radio room and the use of the former Public Office as a bedroom. Some antique light fittings and fans have been installed that are similar but not identical to the originals and the former police bedrooms are now used as guest accommodation. The former courtroom is used as a recreation room and an arched doorway, salvaged from the Burns Philp building prior to its demolition in Cairns, leads from the courtroom to the verandah.

== Description ==
The second Innisfail court house sits on a terraced hillside block on Yorkeys Knob north of Cairns. It is an elevated timber building in two parts (the front section and rear right section orse former court house) with encircling verandahs. It has a corrugated iron pyramid roof over the front section and a corrugated iron hipped roof, terminating in a gable and skillion verandah roof over the right rear section. A set of symmetrical steps with double dowel balustrades leads from a gabled entrance porch at the centre of the front verandah. A white picket fence frames the building as viewed from Buckley Street.

The front and side verandahs feature double slat balustrades and arched timber verandah sweeps. The verandah ceiling is lined with timber. A verandah room is enclosed on the western side with tongue and groove timber boards and double hung sash windows. The buildings have external studs and some weatherboard framing.

=== Former Offices ===
Internally the front portion of the building contains an office, a bedroom, bathroom, kitchen and living/dining area. A line down the center of the hallway floor indicates where the building was cut for removal to its present location. Internal ceilings are lined with timber with four lattice ventilation openings and the floors are polished silky oak. There are three timber archways within the main living/kitchen areas. A number of French doors with glass fanlights lead from the living area to the encircling verandah. The kitchen features sash windows opening onto the western verandah. A bedroom and bathroom, separated by a fibro partition that reaches halfway to the ceiling (installed during its conversion to a police station) are on the western side of the front portion of the building. The bathroom is lined in tile and fibro cement sheeting boards and its fittings are constructed from materials salvaged during relocation of the building from Innisfail. The bedroom has three French doors, one opening north to the front verandah, one to the enclosed western verandah and one to the internal hall.

=== Former Courtroom ===
The rear right portion of the building (former court room) now incorporates a recreation room, guest accommodation, a bathroom and laundry, although its configuration remains from its conversion for police use. Ceilings are lined with timber and floors are original polished silky oak timber. Two lattice ventilation openings are visible in the unpainted ceiling, and four fans and cross bracing of painted metal poles are also evident. The recreation room contains four casement windows with fanlights, two timber doors opening onto the verandah at the rear and two timber doors opening onto the front verandah. There is also an arch door opening onto the verandah facing the street, which has been fitted since the buildings relocation. The lower wallboards on the western side can be opened for added ventilation. Many internal furnishings are original including a courtroom witness box, and prisoner's dock.

A timber door on the eastern side of the recreation room leads to a laundry and bathroom, both with tiled floors and timber walls. There are double hung sash windows with "kosiosko" glass in the bathroom and glass louvered windows in the laundry opening to the eastern side of the building. At the rear of the recreation room there are five bedrooms, three within the enclosed rear verandah of the former courtroom, and two forming the rear of the former court house. All have single skin timber walls and timber ceilings. Glass louvres face south from the bedrooms in the enclosed verandah. A wall that reaches halfway to the ceiling separates the two internal bedrooms (former offices) from each other. Floors throughout are of silky oak, highly polished by the current owners. While most of the flooring timbers are original, a small amount has been replaced using timber salvaged during its relocation. The rear verandah is unpainted and faces the back garden.

A large roof ventilation fleche sits prominently on the roof of the former court house. It is located within an elaborate decorative casing with four arched walls and a pyramid roof with filial.

The sub floor is enclosed on three sides with mini orb, with a block wall incorporating the former Innisfail Police Station gaol cell door forming the fourth wall. It has a concrete floor and is used as a garage. A range of material retained since the relocation of the building from Innisfail, are stored under the house. The grounds with tropical plantings complement the aesthetics of the building, but are not of cultural heritage significance.

== Heritage listing ==
The second Innisfail Court House, now at Yorkeys Knob, was listed on the Queensland Heritage Register on 6 December 2004 having satisfied the following criteria.

The place is important in demonstrating the evolution or pattern of Queensland's history.

The second Innisfail court house is important for illustrating the pattern of Queensland's history in demonstrating the evolution of design and materials used in the construction of court houses in regional Queensland. While most second-generation Queensland court houses dating from the 1920s and 1930s were built using materials such as rendered brick or masonry, the second Innisfail court house is notable in the interwar era for its timber construction and design along more traditional Queensland public building lines.

The place demonstrates rare, uncommon or endangered aspects of Queensland's cultural heritage.

The place demonstrates rare and uncommon aspects of Queensland's cultural heritage as a regional example of a naturally ventilated tropical court house built of timber and designed for the North Queensland climate. Its sophisticated ventilation system, which has survived largely intact, features low-level hinged wall flaps to allow cool air into the courtroom and associated ducted roof vents. Although certain aspects of such systems are known of, this configuration is not common in public or private buildings in Queensland. It is an important example of this combined ventilation system in Queensland.

Although it has been relocated, and its current siting and use as a residence has no real heritage importance, the second Innisfail court house represents a rare and intact example of a naturally ventilated tropical court house built in North Queensland.
