= Monochelus calcaratus =

Scientific classification
- Kingdom: Animalia
- Phylum: Arthropoda
- Class: Insecta
- Order: Coleoptera
- Suborder: Polyphaga
- Infraorder: Scarabaeiformia
- Family: Scarabaeidae
- Genus: Monochelus
- Species: M. calcaratus

Binomial name
- Monochelus calcaratus Burmeister, 1844

Species of beetle

Monochelus calcaratus, the small wattle chafer, is a species of beetle of the family Scarabaeidae. It is found in South Africa (Eastern Cape, KwaZulu-Natal).

== Description ==
Adults reach a length of about 7–8 mm (0.28–0.31 in). Males are black, with the elytra red and the legs piceous red. The pronotum has five bands of flavescent scales. The scutellum is scaly and the elytra have rows of scales. The apical part of the propygidium, the whole of the pygidium and the sides of abdomen and of pectus are scaly. Females are similar to males in colour, sculpture, and vestiture, but the punctures on the elytra are seldom filled with scales.

== Life history ==
The larvae have been recorded feeding on the roots of young trees. In rare cases, adults have been observed defoliating trees. The species is considered a minor pest of black wattles.
