= Monochelus laetulus =

Scientific classification
- Kingdom: Animalia
- Phylum: Arthropoda
- Class: Insecta
- Order: Coleoptera
- Suborder: Polyphaga
- Infraorder: Scarabaeiformia
- Family: Scarabaeidae
- Genus: Monochelus
- Species: M. laetulus

Binomial name
- Monochelus laetulus Péringuey, 1902

Species of beetle

Monochelus laetulus is a species of beetle of the family Scarabaeidae. It is found in South Africa (KwaZulu-Natal).

== Description ==
Adults reach a length of about 7–8 mm (0.28–0.31 in). Males are black, with the whole upper surface, the pygidial part, the abdomen and pectus entirely covered with contiguous ochre-yellow scales. The legs are red. The head, pronotum and elytra are similar in shape to those of Monochelus laetus, but there is no denuded space or bands on the pronotum and the elytra. The scales on the latter are round, and they have on each side two faintly raised costae covered by a series of slightly lighter yellow scales. Females are similar to males, but the pronotum is covered with appressed squamose hairs instead of scales.
