= Monochelus pulcher =

Scientific classification
- Kingdom: Animalia
- Phylum: Arthropoda
- Class: Insecta
- Order: Coleoptera
- Suborder: Polyphaga
- Infraorder: Scarabaeiformia
- Family: Scarabaeidae
- Genus: Monochelus
- Species: M. pulcher

Binomial name
- Monochelus pulcher Péringuey, 1885

Species of beetle

Monochelus pulcher is a species of beetle of the family Scarabaeidae. It is found in South Africa (North West).

== Description ==
Adults reach a length of about 7.5 mm (0.30 in). They are black, with the elytra testaceous red and the antennae rufescent (with the club black). The head is very rugose and the pronotum has a longitudinal, not much raised and rounded costate carina and a shallow, but somewhat broad furrow on each side, which, like the two median furrows are filled with yellow scales, the median carina is impunctate. There is also an impunctate longitudinal space on each side of the disk. The scutellum is rugulose and the elytra are deeply and irregularly punctate and rugose laterally, and have a distinct costa in the discoidal part, the intervals on each side of the costa are somewhat deep and broad. The pygidium is black and glabrous and the abdominal segments are also glabrous.
