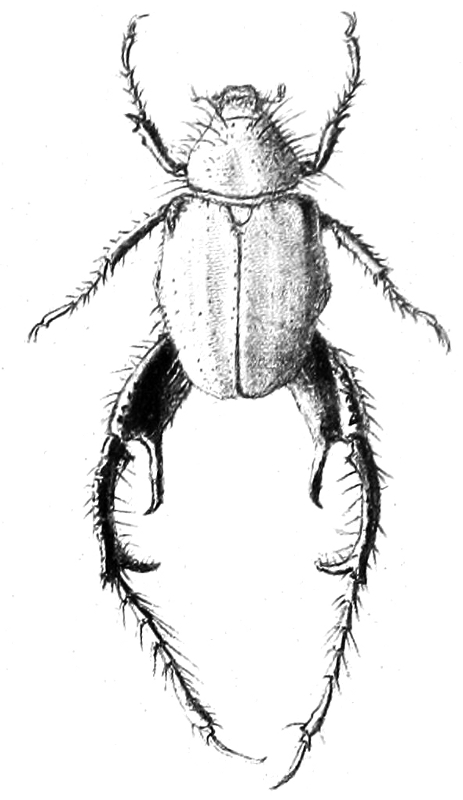

Scientific classification
- Kingdom: Animalia
- Phylum: Arthropoda
- Class: Insecta
- Order: Coleoptera
- Suborder: Polyphaga
- Infraorder: Scarabaeiformia
- Family: Scarabaeidae
- Genus: Monochelus
- Species: M. aurantiacus

Binomial name
- Monochelus aurantiacus Burmeister, 1844

= Monochelus aurantiacus =

Species of beetle

Monochelus aurantiacus is a species of beetle of the family Scarabaeidae. It is found in South Africa (Cape).

== Description ==
Adults reach a length of about 9–11 mm (0.35–0.43 in). Males are black, with the pronotum and the elytra covered with contiguous round orange-yellow scales. The head is very rugose and briefly pubescent. The pronotum is fringed along the anterior and the lateral margins with long black setae and the elytra have along the suture, immediately below the scutellum, a fascicle of very long black setae and a series of short ones following the suture, as well as some hardly distinct rows of similar but still shorter setae projecting from between the scales. The pygidium and underside are scabrose and glabrous. Females are covered (like the males) with contiguous orange-yellow scales on the elytra and the pronotum, but have in the discoidal part of the latter two denuded conspicuous patches.
