= Monochelus inops =

Scientific classification
- Kingdom: Animalia
- Phylum: Arthropoda
- Class: Insecta
- Order: Coleoptera
- Suborder: Polyphaga
- Infraorder: Scarabaeiformia
- Family: Scarabaeidae
- Genus: Monochelus
- Species: M. inops

Binomial name
- Monochelus inops Péringuey, 1902

Species of beetle

Monochelus inops is a species of beetle of the family Scarabaeidae. It is found in South Africa.

== Description ==
Adults reach a length of about 7–7.5 mm (0.28–0.30 in). They are black, and covered on the head, pronotum and elytra with dingy, ashy-grey appressed hairs that are scarcely squamose. The antennae are rufescent with the club black. The head is roughly punctate and clothed with short, slightly flavescent, erect hairs. The pronotum is closely punctate, but the punctures are not scabrose, and bear each a short appressed hair. The anterior and lateral margins are fringed with very long, slightly fulvous, bristly hairs. The scutellum is covered with sub-squamose hairs and the elytra are roughly punctulate and have the squamose hairs denser in the two dorsal intervals. The propygidium and underside are clothed with appressed, squamose, slightly flavescent hairs.

== Distribution ==
The species was described from four males preserved in spirit. When describing the species, Péringuey was unable to determine the true habitat of the species. He stated it might prove to be Port Elizabeth in the Cape Colony or Durban in Natal.
