= Monochelus jucundus =

Scientific classification
- Kingdom: Animalia
- Phylum: Arthropoda
- Class: Insecta
- Order: Coleoptera
- Suborder: Polyphaga
- Infraorder: Scarabaeiformia
- Family: Scarabaeidae
- Genus: Monochelus
- Species: M. jucundus

Binomial name
- Monochelus jucundus Péringuey, 1902

Species of beetle

Monochelus jucundus is a species of beetle of the family Scarabaeidae. It is found in South Africa (KwaZulu-Natal).

== Description ==
Adults reach a length of about 5.25–6 mm (0.207–0.236 in). They have piceous red elytra with three bands of scales, which are more distinct in females.
