= Yorkeys Knob =

- Suburb
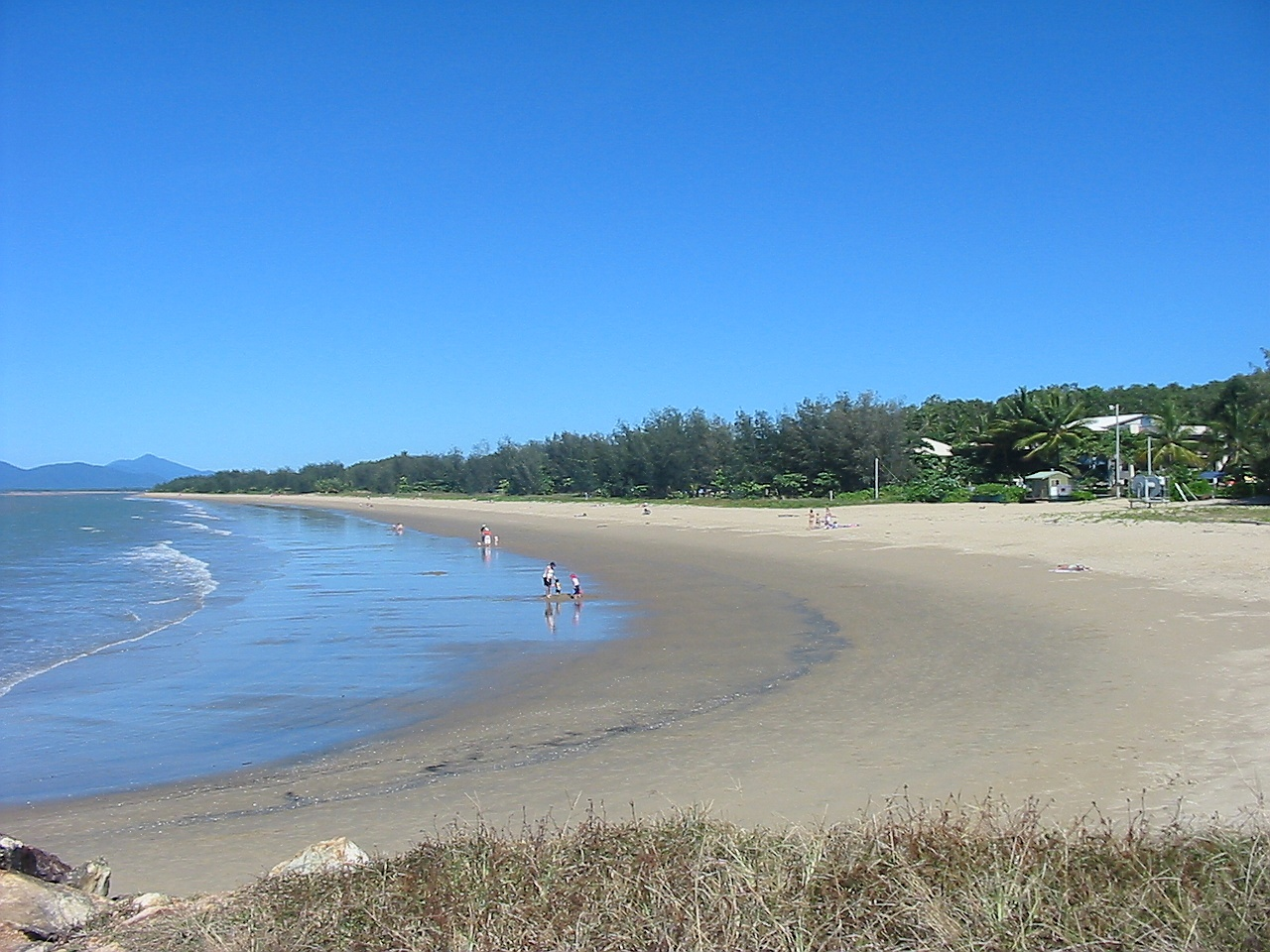
- Yorkeys Knob Beach, c. 2008

- Interactive map of Yorkeys Knob
- Coordinates: 16.8236°S 145.7161°E
- Country: Australia
- State: Queensland
- City: Cairns
- LGA: Cairns Region
- Location: 16.4 km (10.2 mi) N of Cairns CBD; 363 km (226 mi) NNW of Townsville; 1,694 km (1,053 mi) NNW of Brisbane

Government
  - State electorate: Barron River
  - Federal division: Leichhardt

Area
  - Total: 13.9 km^{2} (5.4 sq mi)

Population
  - Total: 2,794 (2021 census)
  - Density: 201.0/km^{2} (520.6/sq mi)
- Time zone: UTC+10:00 (AEST)
- Postcode: 4878
Suburbs around Yorkeys Knob
Trinity Park	Coral Sea	Coral Sea
Smithfield	Yorkeys Knob	Holloways Beach
Caravonica	Barron	Holloways Beach

Yorkeys Knob is a coastal suburb of Cairns in the Cairns Region, Queensland, Australia. In the 2026 census, Yorkeys Knob had a population of 3,236 people.

Yorkeys Knob is frequently listed as an unusual or humorous place name due to it including the word "knob".

== Geography ==
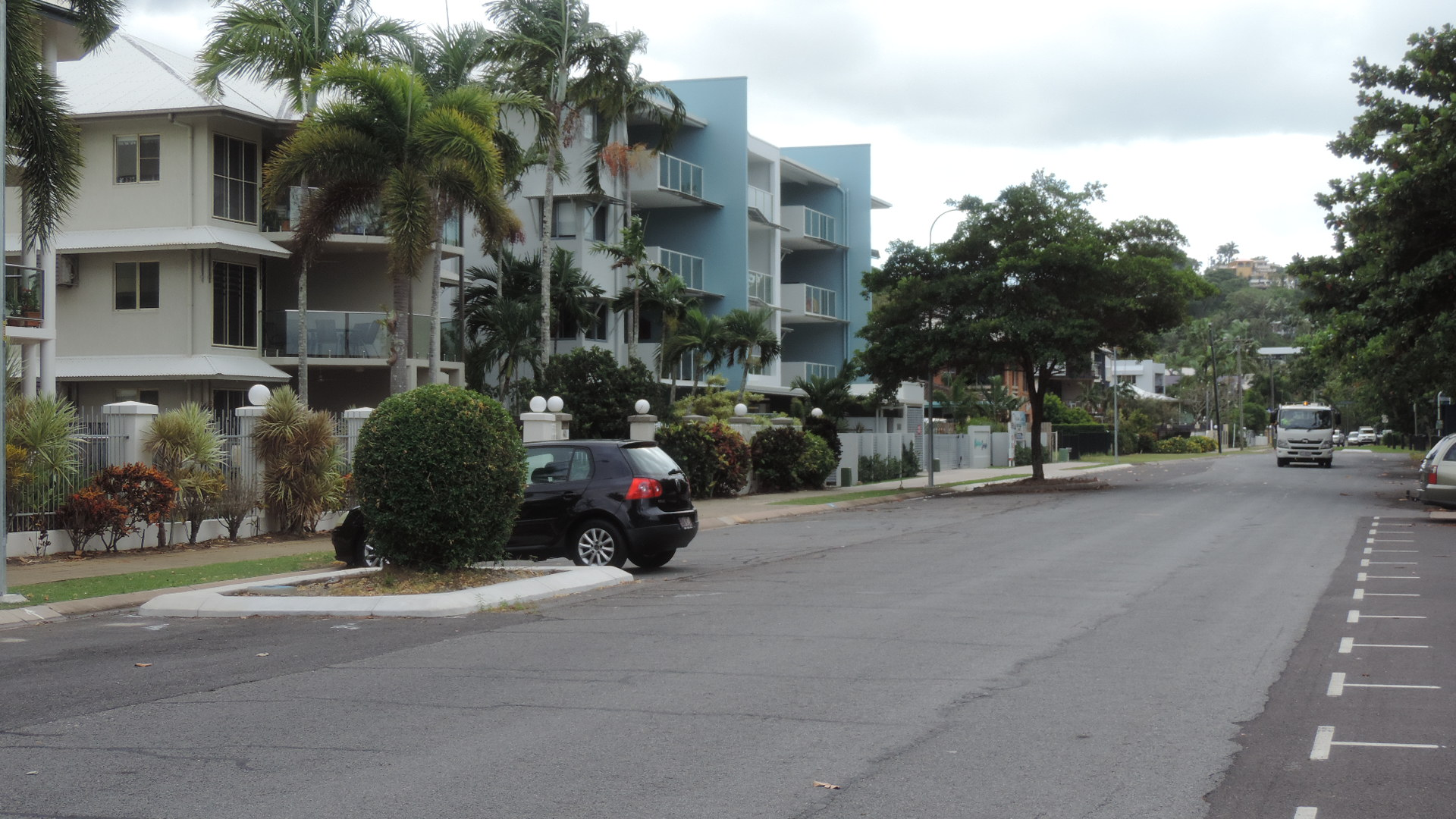
Looking north along the Esplanade towards the "knob", Yorks Knob, 2018

Yorkeys Knob is a beachside suburb north of the Cairns CBD. It is bounded by the Coral Sea to the north, Thomatis Creek to the east, Captain Cook Highway to the south, and Half Moon Creek to the north-west.

Yorkeys Knob is predominantly low-lying (less than 10 metres above sea level), with the exception of the hill (known as Yorkeys Knob-top), which rises to 60 metres on the coast at Yorkeys Point. The northern part of the suburb, near the coast, is residential, but the majority of the land use is agricultural, mainly growing sugarcane. There is a long, sandy beach along the Coral Sea.

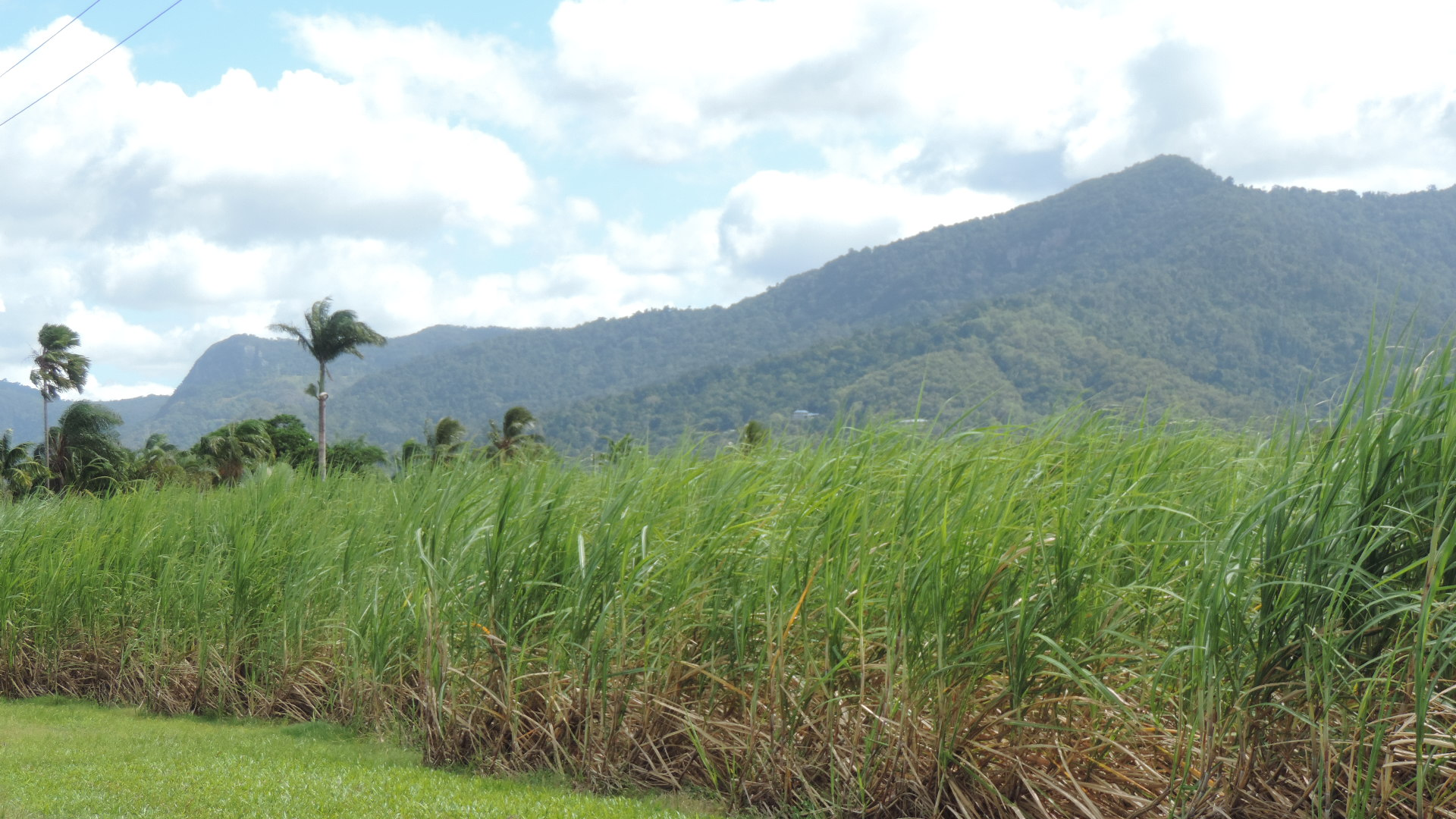
Field of sugarcane, Walker Road, 2018

== History ==
Yorkeys Knob is situated in the traditional country of the indigenous Djabugay (Tjapukai) people.

Yorkeys Knob got its name from George Lawson, a Yorkshire-born, Cairns-based beche-de-mer fisherman, from his nickname Yorkey, and "knob" meaning a rounded hill.

On 10 June 1886, Yorkey Lawson reported the loss of a man and his wife from Green Island. They had left to visit the wreck of the Upolu, intending to return the same day. Lawson conduced a search, but was unable to find any trace of them, not even evidence of an accident. The pilot cutter was sent to search for the couple.

Lawson built a homestead adjoining the Mount Buchan estate, near what is now Yorkeys Knob. During the off-season for fishing, he and his sons grew pumpkins, sweet potatoes and paddy melons, but that venture was not successful. Whatever the bandicoots and pigs didn't eat, the crocodiles did. Lawson used the mangroves near his homestead for the firewood and water needed for his beche-de-mer smoking station on Green Island, about 24 kilometres (15 mi) from the coast.

Yorkey's Knob State School opened on 18 February 1957. It originally occupied a site on corner of Wattle Street and Cunningham Street (16.8096°S 145.7194°E). The school relocated to its current site in 1980 and the former site was given to the Musgrave Shire Council (now Cairns Regional Council) to become a community centre (known officially since 1996 as Old School Park). The SES occupied the former schoolhouse while the former teacher's residence was used to house a caretaker. A new community centre was built on the site of the school's old tennis courts. The park and its facilities were managed the Yorkeys Knob Activities Group until August 2021, when the Cairns Regional Council took control.

Locals are attached to the name, despite the reaction it sometimes gets, given that "knob" is a slang term for the glans penis. In 2007, residents successfully prevented a developer from advertising a development as being at "Yorkeys Beach".

== Demographics ==
At the 2011 census, Yorkeys Knob had a population of 2,766 people. At the 2016 census, Yorkeys Knob had a population of 2,759 people and, at the 2021 census, the population numbered 2,794 people. At the 2026 census the population numbered 3,236 people.

== Heritage listings ==
Yorkeys Knob has a number of heritage-listed sites, including:

- Second Innisfail Court House, 40 Buckley Street (16.8029°S 145.7193°E), relocated to Yorkeys Knob as a private residence

== Education ==
Yorkeys Knob State School is a government primary (Prep–6) school for boys and girls at 26–38 Clinton Street (16.8142°S 145.7227°E). In 2018, the school had an enrolment of 252 students with 19 teachers (16 full-time equivalent) and 13 non-teaching staff (8 full-time equivalent).

The nearest government secondary school is Smithfield State High School in neighbouring Smithfield, to the west.

== Amenities ==
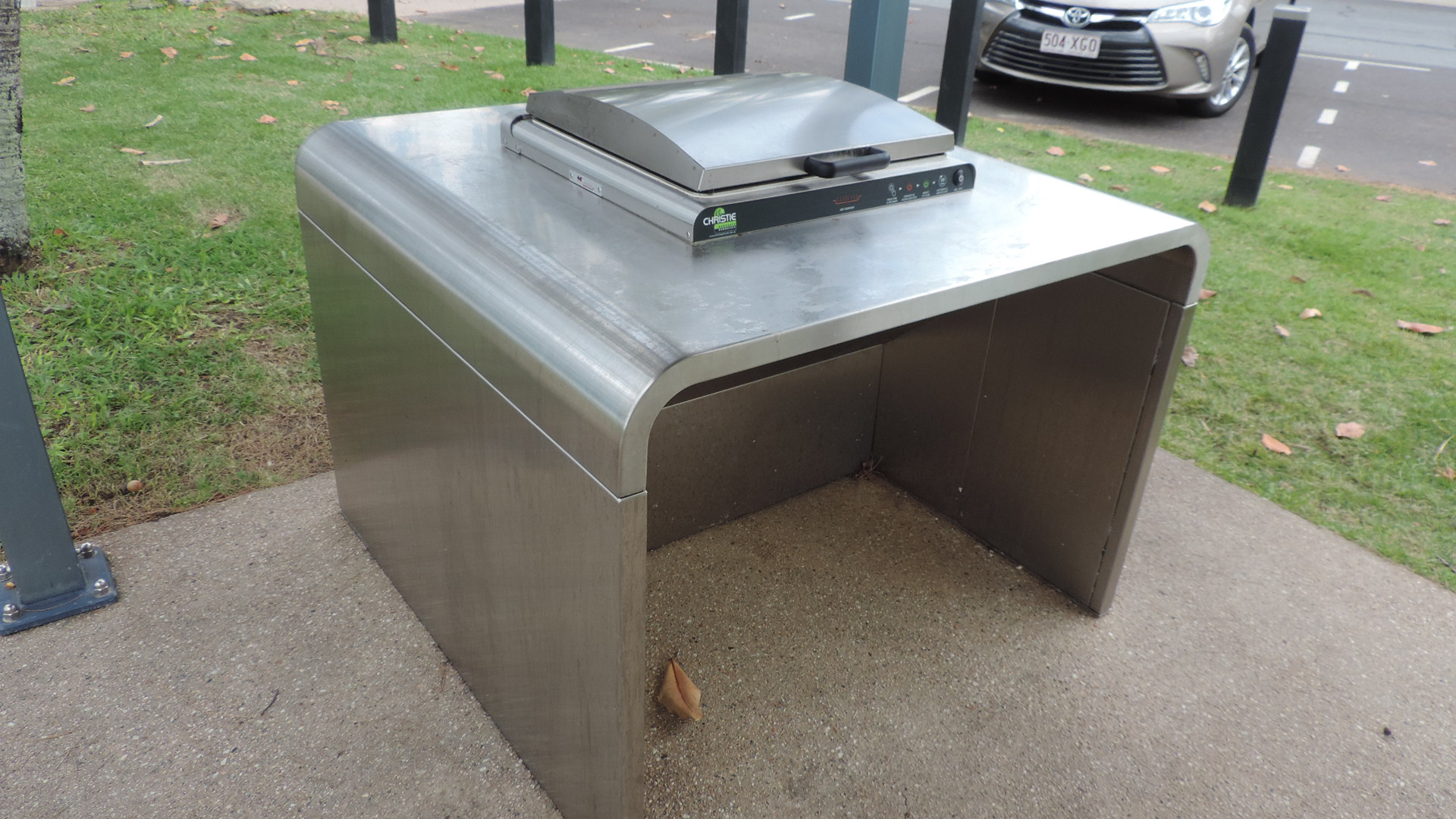
Free public barbeque at the foreshore park, 2018

Yorkeys Knob Community Hall is at 58 Wattle Street (16.80966°S 145.71964°E). It seats up to 80 people and is operated by the Cairns Regional Council.

Yorkeys Knob SES Facility is in the former schoolhouse at Old School Park at 58–64 Wattle Street (16.8096°S 145.7194°E), adjacent to the community hall.

Half Moon Bay Marina is a 3.8-hectare (9.4-acre) marina (16.8018°S 145.7168°E). At the marina are the Yorkeys Knob Boating Club (16.8019°S 145.7177°E). There is a public boat ramp at the marina (16.8014°S 145.7184°E); it is managed by the Cairns Regional Council.

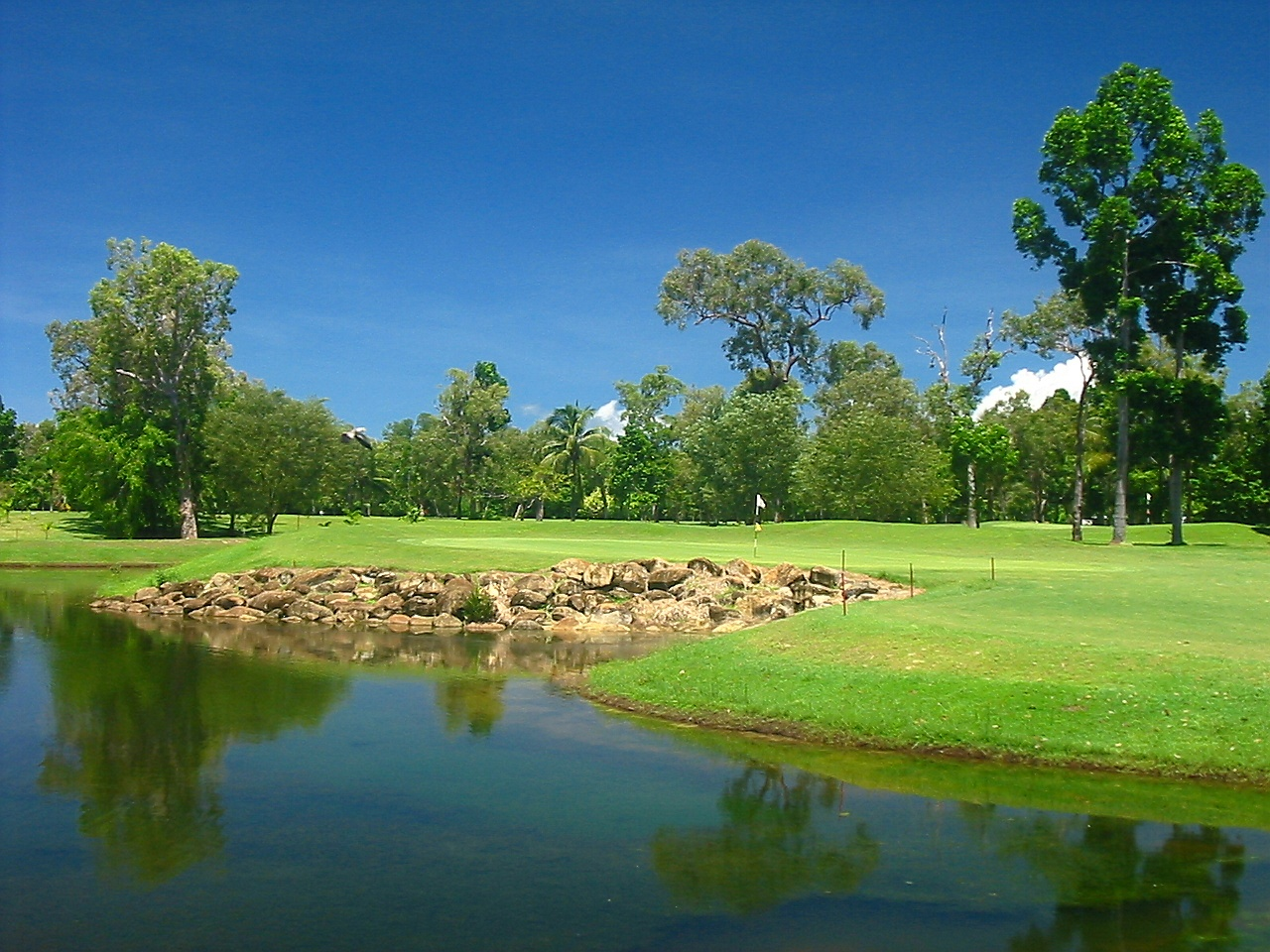
Ninth hole, Half Moon Bay Golf Club, 2007

Half Moon Bay Golf Club is located at the western end of Wattle Street (16.8089°S 145.7168°E), and is a short and quite basic layout which features a number of water hazards. It is 5,129 metres long and par is 70.

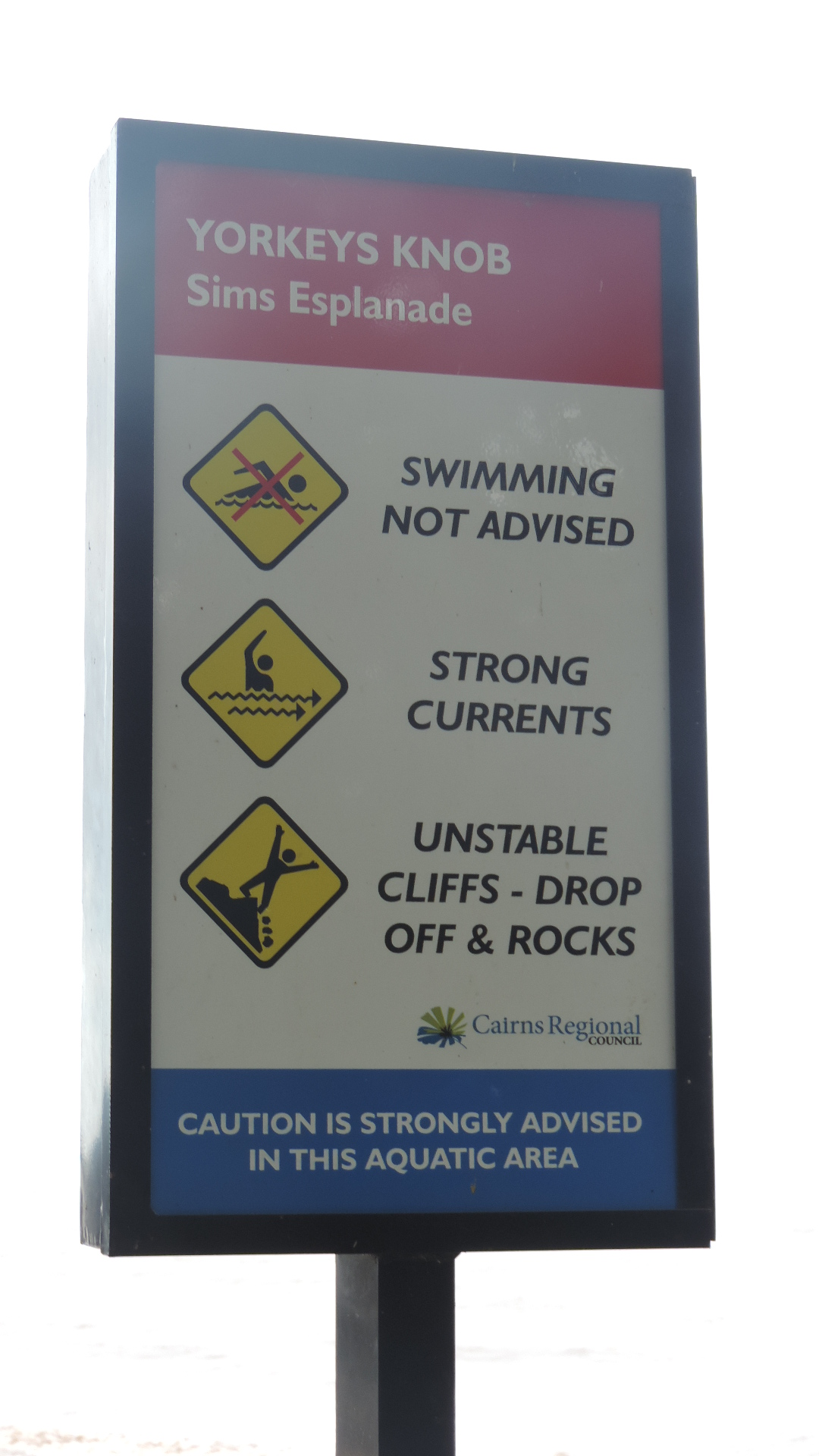
Warning sign about swimming risks, 2018

The swimming area is at the northern end of Sims Esplanade. It is patrolled for six months of the year by Surf Lifesaving Queensland, and has a stinger net to protect swimmers from box jellyfish (Chironex fleckeri). The safest swimming is between the flags placed by the lifesavers; there have been drownings around the rocks a short distance away. There are barbecue and picnic facilities, plus public toilets and showers.

There are a number of parks in the area:

- Haling Park (16.8128°S 145.7190°E)
- Old School Park, corner of Wattle Street and Cunningham Street (16.8091°S 145.7195°E)
- Ray Howarth Park (16.8079°S 145.7181°E)

Cairns Go Kart Track is on the corner of Walker Street and the Captain Cook Highway (16.8490°S 145.7143°E).

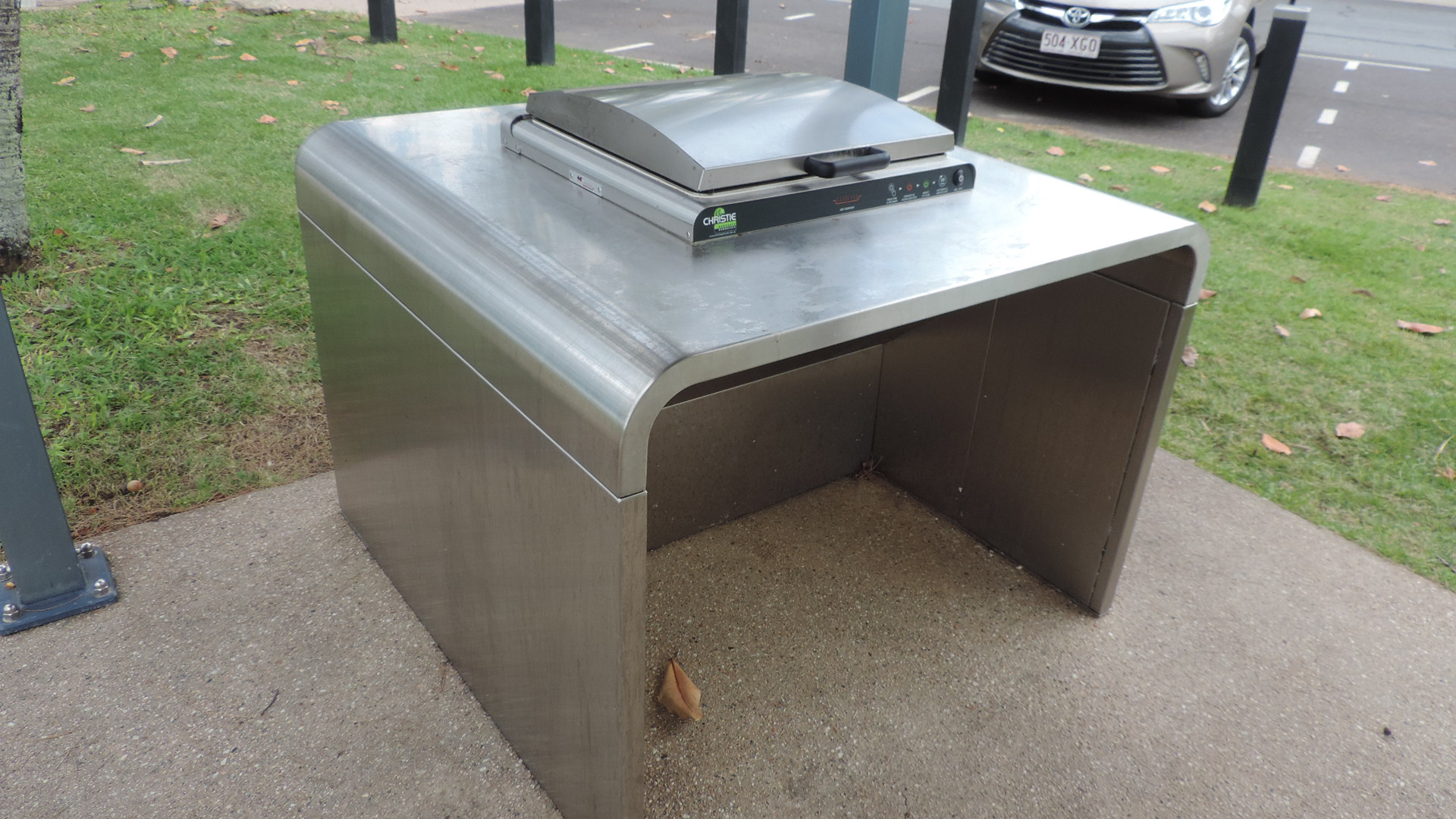
Free public barbeque at the foreshore park, 2018

== Wildlife ==
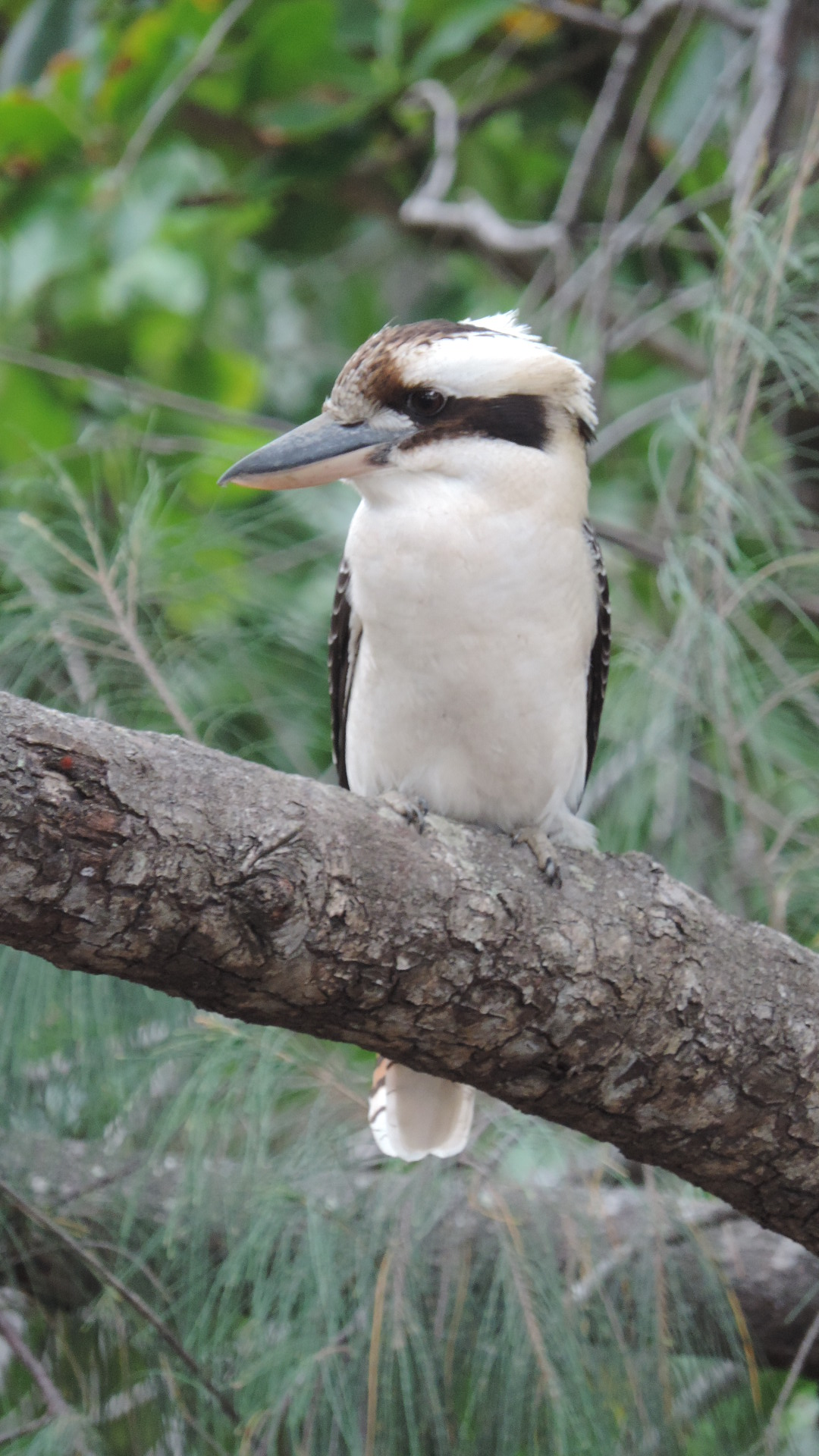
Kookaburra in a tree on the foreshore, 2018

The golf club is a bird-watching location, with masked lapwings, bush stone-curlews, a range of kingfishers, rainbow lorikeets and sea eagles. Between the 12th and 13th holes lies Ray Howarth Park, which is home to a colony of flying foxes, which you can see heading out searching for food in the early evenings. During the day they hang upside down from the mangrove trees. When the melaleucas are in flower you will find them gorging on nectar in the trees at the northern end of Sim's Esplanade.

A small bush track near the State school offers a chance to see a variety of birds, monitor lizards, and many skinks. Pied oystercatchers, bush stone-curlews, ghost fiddler crabs, sand-bubbler crabs, the beach tree skink, and bottlenose dolphins can all be found at the beach.

== Transport ==
Yorkeys Knob is serviced by Sunbus seven days a week. The normal service, the 112, runs hourly Monday to Sunday. It runs to the Smithfield shopping centre, the nearest large shopping complex, where there is a connection on the 120 to Cairns City. A direct service, the 113, is available during the peak periods, travelling to Cairns in the mornings and back to Yorkeys in the late afternoon.
