= Monochelus =

Scientific classification
- Kingdom: Animalia
- Phylum: Arthropoda
- Class: Insecta
- Order: Coleoptera
- Suborder: Polyphaga
- Infraorder: Scarabaeiformia
- Family: Scarabaeidae
- Subfamily: Melolonthinae
- Tribe: Hopliini
- Genus: Monochelus; Le Peletier de Saint-Fargeau & Audinet-Serville, 1828

Synonyms
- Trichidius Burmeister, 1844

Genus of leaf beetles

Monochelus is a genus of beetles belonging to the family Scarabaeidae.

== Species ==
- Monochelus angolensis Moser, 1919
- Monochelus aurantiacus Burmeister, 1844
- Monochelus calcaratus Burmeister, 1844
- Monochelus femoratus Burmeister, 1855
- Monochelus formosus Burmeister, 1844
- Monochelus funebris Péringuey, 1902
- Monochelus hilaris Péringuey, 1908
- Monochelus inops Péringuey, 1902
- Monochelus jucundus Péringuey, 1902
- Monochelus laetulus Péringuey, 1902
- Monochelus laetus Péringuey, 1902
- Monochelus lineatus Burmeister, 1855
- Monochelus litigiosus Péringuey, 1902
- Monochelus natalensis Péringuey, 1885
- Monochelus ornatus Burmeister, 1844
- Monochelus princeps Péringuey, 1902
- Monochelus pruinosus Burmeister, 1844
- Monochelus pulcher Péringuey, 1885
- Monochelus pulvinatus Péringuey, 1902
- Monochelus pusillus (Wiedemann, 1823)
- Monochelus sagae Péringuey, 1908
- Monochelus simplicipes Péringuey, 1902
- Monochelus squamans (Gyllenhal, 1817)
- Monochelus squamulatus Laporte, 1840
- Monochelus vittiger (Blanchard, 1850)
