= Monochelus ornatus =

Scientific classification
- Kingdom: Animalia
- Phylum: Arthropoda
- Class: Insecta
- Order: Coleoptera
- Suborder: Polyphaga
- Infraorder: Scarabaeiformia
- Family: Scarabaeidae
- Genus: Monochelus
- Species: M. ornatus

Binomial name
- Monochelus ornatus Burmeister, 1844

Species of beetle

Monochelus ornatus is a species of beetle of the family Scarabaeidae. It is found in South Africa (KwaZulu-Natal, Gauteng).

== Description ==
Adults reach a length of about 6–7 mm (0.24–0.28 in). They are black, with the elytra and legs red and shining. The pronotum has a narrow median band of flavescent scales, and the sides are broadly covered with similar scales. The scutellum is hairy, and on each elytron there is a band of not very closely set whitish flavescent scales running alongside the suture from about the median part to the apex and a dorsal one beginning at the base but obliterated at about the median part. The propygidium, pygidium and abdomen are covered with contiguous yellow scales.
