= Monochelus funebris =

Scientific classification
- Kingdom: Animalia
- Phylum: Arthropoda
- Class: Insecta
- Order: Coleoptera
- Suborder: Polyphaga
- Infraorder: Scarabaeiformia
- Family: Scarabaeidae
- Genus: Monochelus
- Species: M. funebris

Binomial name
- Monochelus funebris Péringuey, 1902

Species of beetle

Monochelus funebris is a species of beetle of the family Scarabaeidae. It is found in South Africa (KwaZulu-Natal).

== Description ==
Adults reach a length of about 5–5.25 mm (0.197–0.207 in). They are black, shining, and clothed with small lanceolate greyish scales. The head is very closely punctate and has a very short greyish pubescence. The pronotum is deeply but moderately closely punctured, each puncture bearing a short, squamiform appressed greyish hair, and there is a border of thicker and slightly more flavescent squamose hairs. The scutellum is covered with elongate greyish scales and the elytra are bi-costate on each side and with the intervals filled with lanceolate, somewhat closely set but not contiguous scales. The propygidium, abdominal segments and pectus are covered with elongate scales, and the pygidium with short hair-like scales broadly scattered.
