= Monochelus hilaris =

Scientific classification
- Kingdom: Animalia
- Phylum: Arthropoda
- Class: Insecta
- Order: Coleoptera
- Suborder: Polyphaga
- Infraorder: Scarabaeiformia
- Family: Scarabaeidae
- Genus: Monochelus
- Species: M. hilaris

Binomial name
- Monochelus hilaris Péringuey, 1908

Species of beetle

Monochelus hilaris is a species of beetle of the family Scarabaeidae. It is found in South Africa (KwaZulu-Natal).

== Description ==
Adults reach a length of about 6.8–7.75 mm (0.268–0.305 in). Males are black with all the femora red, clothed with closely set orange-yellow scales. The head is covered with sub-erect squamose setae and the pronotum is clothed with contiguous ovate yellow scales leaving two narrow longitudinal denuded bands in the centre of the disk, on the anterior part only of these two bands spring long, erect, sub-rufescent hairs forming a long crest, and there is a fringe of similar hairs along the outer margin. The scutellum is closely squamose and the elytra have on each side two very distinct costae, which show through the yellow, closely set, ovate scales clothing the surface, the suture, however, is narrowly denuded. The pygidium is sprinkled with fine, numerous yellowish scales not hiding the background altogether, and the propygidium has a broad apical band of closely set scales. The underside is closely scaly. Females are clothed, like the male, with appressed orange-yellow scales which are, however, more elongated and more hair-like on the upper side. The elytra are red instead of being black, and the two costae are less apparent.
