= Monochelus pulvinatus =

Scientific classification
- Kingdom: Animalia
- Phylum: Arthropoda
- Class: Insecta
- Order: Coleoptera
- Suborder: Polyphaga
- Infraorder: Scarabaeiformia
- Family: Scarabaeidae
- Genus: Monochelus
- Species: M. pulvinatus

Binomial name
- Monochelus pulvinatus Péringuey, 1902

Species of beetle

Monochelus pulvinatus is a species of beetle of the family Scarabaeidae. It is found in South Africa (KwaZulu-Natal).

== Description ==
Adults reach a length of about 5.5 mm (0.22 in). Males are black, with the elytra chocolate-brown. The head is scaly and the pronotum has a median band of whitish scales, a discoidal one and a more or less regular marginal one. The elytra are irregularly sprinkled with ovate white scales and the scutellum, propygidium, pygidium and underside are covered with closely set whitish scales. Females are similar to males, but the scales are a little wider on the upperside and golden-yellow. Furthermore, the denuded band on the pygidium is very well defined.
