= Monochelus natalensis =

Scientific classification
- Kingdom: Animalia
- Phylum: Arthropoda
- Class: Insecta
- Order: Coleoptera
- Suborder: Polyphaga
- Infraorder: Scarabaeiformia
- Family: Scarabaeidae
- Genus: Monochelus
- Species: M. natalensis

Binomial name
- Monochelus natalensis Péringuey, 1885

Species of beetle

Monochelus natalensis is a species of beetle of the family Scarabaeidae. It is found in the Democratic Republic of the Congo and South Africa (KwaZulu-Natal, Transvaal, Cape).

== Description ==
Adults reach a length of about 9–11 mm (0.35–0.43 in). Males are black, with the elytra and legs red and shining. The head and pronotum are clothed with round, contiguous, somewhat orange-yellow scales leaving on each side of the disk a denuded longitudinal band. The scutellum is densely scaly and the elytra have a few scattered scales. The propygidium is densely scaly, and the pygidium is less densely scaly. Females have the same colour and vestiture as the males, and the scales are similar and arranged in the same manner.
