= Innisfail Court House =

Historic court house in Queensland, Australia

Innisfail Courthouse
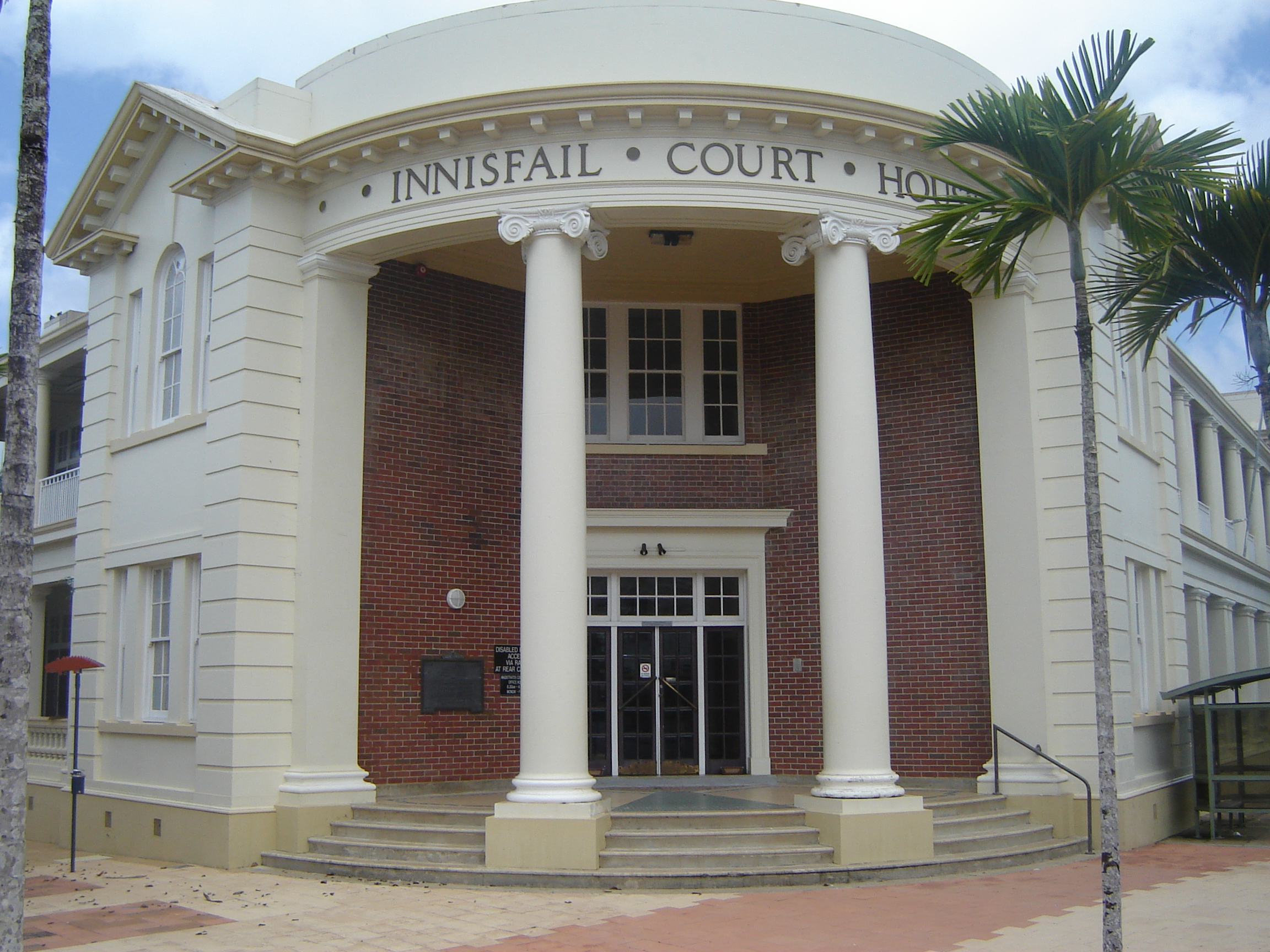
- Innisfail Courthouse

- Location within Queensland
- 17.5244°S 146.0315°E
- Location: 10 Edith Street, Innisfail, Cassowary Coast Region, Queensland, Australia

History
- Design period: 1919–1930s (interwar period)
- Built: 1939–1939

Site notes
- Architect: Department of Public Works (Queensland)
- Architectural style: Classicism

Queensland Heritage Register
- Official name: Innisfail Court House
- Type: state heritage (built)
- Designated: 13 January 1995
- Reference no.: 601578
- Significant period: 1930s
- Significant components: office/s, court house
- Builders: Day labour

Innisfail Court House is a heritage-listed court house at 10 Edith Street, Innisfail, Cassowary Coast Region, Queensland, Australia. It is the town's third court house. It was designed in the inter-war classical style by the Department of Public Works (Queensland) and built in 1939 by day labour. The current court house is a two-storeyed brick building with a corrugated-iron roof. It was added to the Queensland Heritage Register on 13 January 1995.

== History ==
Opened in March 1940, this was the third court house to be built in Innisfail, replacing the Second Innisfail Court House, a timber building erected in 1888. The building was designed in the office of the Department of Public Works; Andrew Baxter Leven was the Queensland Government Architect at the time.

The Johnstone River area was settled by cedar-cutters, with the first major planting of sugar cane by occurring in 1880. TH Fitzgerald is generally credited with planting the first sugar cane, and was responsible for the erection of the first mill in the area, late in 1881. Also in 1881, a town was laid out at the junction of the South Johnstone and North Johnstone Rivers, known reputedly as the Junction. The name Geraldton was given to the town in 1883.

Geraldton's first official building was erected c. 1881, probably on the police reserve, accommodated a police station, court house, unofficial post office, lands office, customs office, an office for the Clerk of Petty Sessions and a gaol. Tenders for a new court house was called in late 1887, and plans for the building indicate the location of the building as on the corner of the police reserve bounded by Edith and Rankin Streets.

The name of the town was changed to Innisfail in 1910. By the late 1900s-early 1910s, the Innisfail district was attracting attention from both land speculators and settlers. The Queensland Government had expressed its intention of opening up the Mourilyan Harbour, and of resuming and extending the local tramline inland from the coast, giving further impetus to the development of the district.

Innisfail was devastated by a record flood in 1913, then by a cyclone in 1918, which destroyed many of the town's timber buildings. Despite these setbacks, the town prospered and opened its third sugar mill in 1916. Soldier settlement was established in Johnstone Shire around 1918, and in 1922, a number of blocks were made available to returned soldiers for growing sugar cane. Completion of the North Coast railway from Brisbane to Cairns in 1924, gave further impetus to the development of the district. By the 1920s, the Innisfail sugar industry was producing vast quantities of sugar cane and record yields of sugar, and the prosperity thisbought to the town was reflected in the many substantial buildings erected in the twenties and thirties. These include important civic buildings such as the first wing of the hospital, the Roman Catholic Church, the Commonwealth Bank and other commercial premises. Also important in the town's development were the opening of the Jubilee Bridge in 1923, linking the town with East Innisfail and Mourilyan, and the Dardgee Railway Bridge in 1924.

Although consideration was given to the likely need for expanded court house facilities to cope with an increasing amount of official and legal business, it was not until 1937 that plans for the erection of a new court house were drawn up, including the erection of a new two-storeyed brick court house on the site of the timber court house, and relocation of the timber court house to the east of the new court house, for use as the police office and barracks.

During the 1930s Great Depression, Labor Premier William Forgan Smith established a government initiated works scheme under the Income (Unemployment Relief) Act (1930) to create employment. This involved the employment of architects, foremen, labourers and the use of local materials in the design and construction of government buildings such as court houses, government offices and state schools. The Innisfail and Mackay court houses are two fine examples of the substantial brick buildings erected through this work scheme.

The new building was completed in late 1939. Offices for a number of Government Departments were provided on the ground floor, with the court room and court facilities located on the first floor of the building. Minor alterations have been undertaken to the building in recent years, including the addition of a small air conditioning enclosure at the south east end of the court house.

The court house served as a coordinating point for the Cyclone Larry relief effort in 2006.

== Description ==
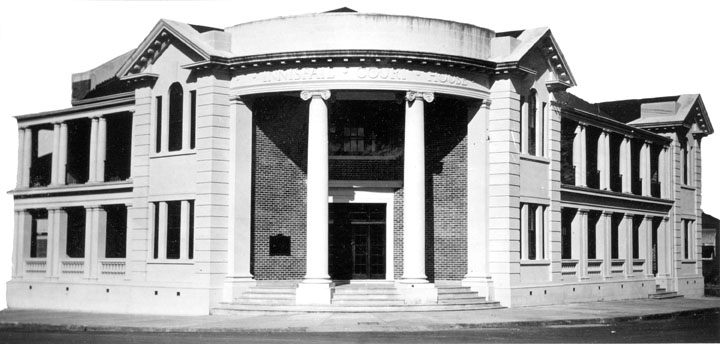
Courthouse, 1940

Innisfail Court House, designed in the inter-war classical style, is a two-storeyed brick building with a corrugated-iron roof and rendered details to the gables and verandahs. A curved portico forms the entrance to the building and addresses the corner through two columns with Ionic capitals. A double-height verandah runs down each street facade. The gables are embellished with broken pediments and Venetian windows.

== Heritage listing ==
The court house was listed on the former Register of the National Estate. Innisfail Court House was listed on the Queensland Heritage Register on 13 January 1995 having satisfied the following criteria.

Completed in 1939 as the third court house in Innisfail, this building survives as an example of the development of Innisfail as a commercial and official centre for the surrounding district from the late nineteenth century, and of the prosperity accompanying the expansion of settlement and the sugar industry in the Johnstone area during the early twentieth century.

The Innisfail Court House is a good example of a substantial brick court house which reflects the high standard of Government buildings in Queensland designed by the Department of Public Works during the early-mid 20th century.

The form of the building in relation to its prominent corner location, scale and materials, contribute to the Edith and Rankin Street streetscapes and Innisfail townscape.

Designed and constructed as part of a Government initiated Works scheme created to generate employment throughout Queensland during the 1930s, the Innisfail Court House is also a fine example of the work completed under this scheme.
