= Acacia mabellae =

Mabel's wattle

Scientific classification
- Kingdom: Plantae
- Clade: Tracheophytes
- Clade: Angiosperms
- Clade: Eudicots
- Clade: Rosids
- Order: Fabales
- Family: Fabaceae
- Subfamily: Caesalpinioideae
- Clade: Mimosoid clade
- Genus: Acacia
- Species: A. mabellae

Binomial name
- Acacia mabellae Maiden
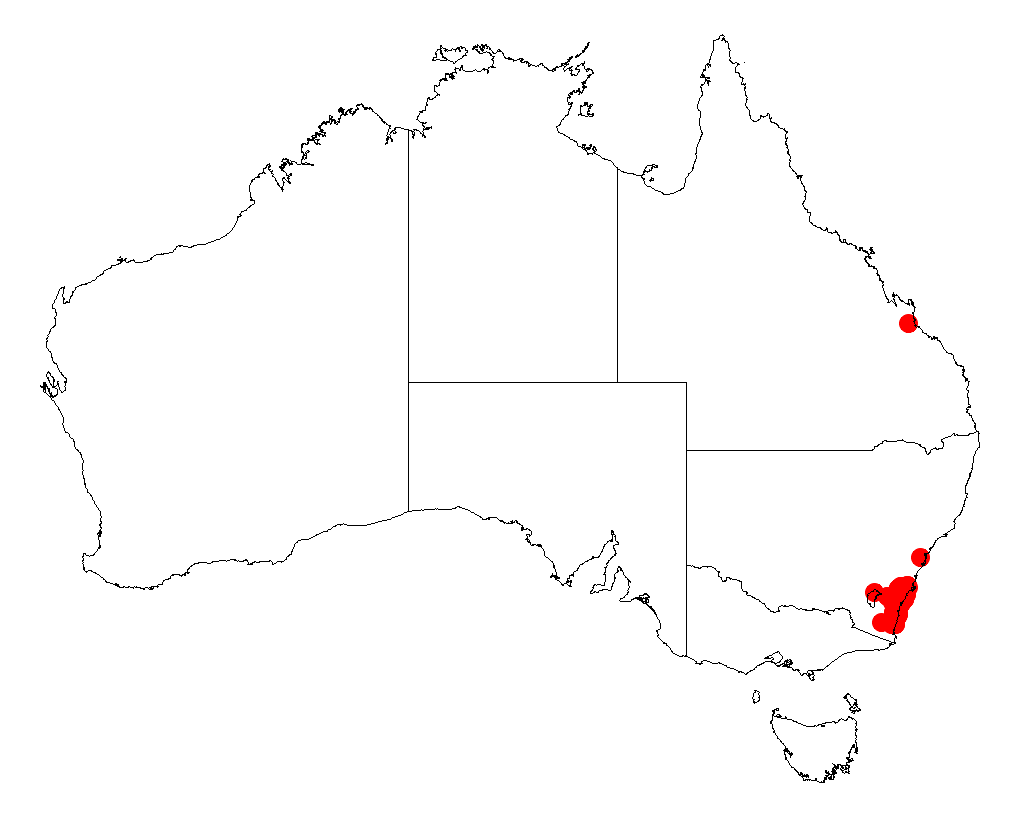
- Occurrence data from AVH

Synonyms
- Acacia mabelliae S.W.L.Jacobs & J.Pickard orth. var.; Acacia penninervis var. angustifolia Maiden; Racosperma mabellae (Maiden) Pedley

Species of legume

Acacia mabellae, commonly known as Mabels's wattle or black wattle, is a species of flowering plant in the family Fabaceae and is endemic to New South Wales, Australia. It is an erect or spreading shrub or tree with glabrous branchlets angled at the outer end, sickle-shaped, usually narrowly elliptic phyllodes, spherical heads of creamy-white flowers, and narrowly oblong, thinly leathery, glabrous pods.

== Description ==
Acacia mabellae is an erect or spreading shrub or tree that typically grows to a height of 3–10 m (9.8–32.8 ft), sometimes 20 m (66 ft), and has often fissured bark, dark grey at the base, and branchlets that are angled or flattened towards the outer ends. The phyllodes are sickle-shaped, narrowly elliptic, occasionally lance-shaped with the narrower end towards the base,100–220 mm (3.9–8.7 in) long and 7–15 mm (0.28–0.59 in) wide, (sometimes up to 200 mm (7.9 in) wide) with a prominent midrib. There is a gland 5–30 mm (0.20–1.18 in) above the pulvinus. The flowers are borne in six to sixteen spherical heads in racemes mostly 15–50 mm (0.59–1.97 in) long on slender peduncles 5–12 mm (0.20–0.47 in) long, each head with 17 to 20 creamy white flowers. Flowering occurs from August to November, and the pods are more or less straight, narrowly oblong, 60–140 mm (2.4–5.5 in) long, 7–15 mm (0.28–0.59 in) wide, thinly leathery and glabrous. The seeds are oblong to egg-shaped, 4–5 mm (0.16–0.20 in) long with a club-shaped aril.

== Taxonomy ==
Acacia mabellae wqs first formally described in 1916 by Joseph Maiden in the Journal and Proceedings of the Royal Society of New South Wales from specimens collected at Milton by Richard Cambage in 1902. The specific epithet (mabellae ) honours Mabel Fanny Cambage, the daughter of Richard Cambage, a colleague of Joseph Maiden. It is also sometimes referred to as 'mabelliae', but this spelling change is not correct.

== Distribution and habitat ==
Mabels's wattle is native to eastern New South Wales on the near-coastal slopes of the Great Dividing Range from about 40 km (25 mi) west of Camden to near Bermagui, and inland to the Budawang Range. It grows in gullies in sandy soils in open Eucalyptus forest and woodland, sometimes on the margin of rainforest.

== See also ==
- List of Acacia species
