= Croydon Court House =

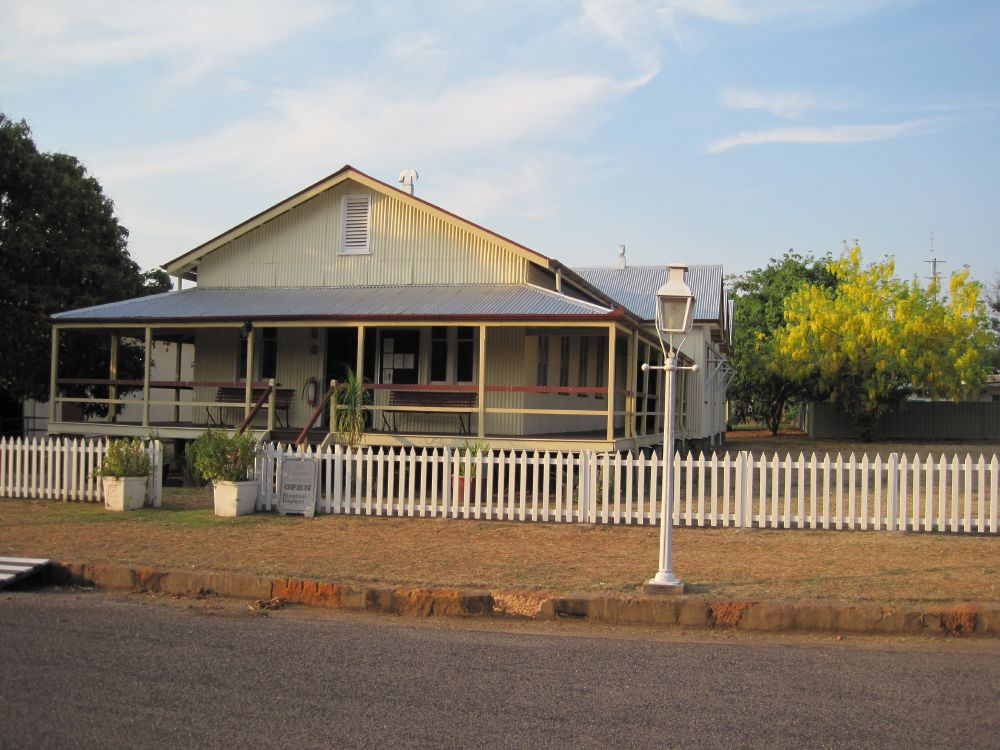
- Court House, 2011

- Location within Queensland Location within Australia
- 18.2033°S 142.2439°E
- Location: Samwell Street, Croydon, Shire of Croydon, Queensland, Australia

History
- Design period: 1870s–1890s (late 19th century)
- Built: 1887

Site notes
- Architect: Colonial Architect's Office

Queensland Heritage Register
- Official name: Court House (former)
- Type: state heritage (built)
- Designated: 21 October 1992
- Reference no.: 600437
- Significant period: 1880s (historical); 1887–1890s (fabric)
- Significant components: court house, office/s

Croydon Court House is a heritage-listed former courthouse at Samwell Street, Croydon, Shire of Croydon, Queensland, Australia. It was designed by Colonial Architect's Office and built in 1887. It was added to the Queensland Heritage Register on 21 October 1992.

== History ==
The former Court House was erected in 1887 as part of a complex of government buildings on the main street of Croydon, at the time a busy goldfield.

In the early 1880s Croydon Downs Station was established on Belmore Creek and evidence of gold was discovered on the property soon after it was established. In October 1885 a major find was reported about 145 kilometres (90 mi) east of Normanton and a rush to the area began. On 18 January 1886 Croydon was proclaimed a goldfield under the administration of the Queensland Mines Department. The town site was then surveyed, and by the end of the year the population of the Croydon field was 2000 and rapidly increasing. A police reserve was declared to service the new field and a modest police station was begun immediately and completed in the same year.

A Court House reserve had been set aside next to the large reserve for police use as part of the administrative infrastructure of the goldfield. The Queensland Government of the time faced the problem of policing a huge area with a scattered population on a limited budget. Transport also posed problems, especially before the development of reliable roads and a railway network. The situation was addressed by instituting a system of regional courts served by visiting magistrates or judges and which had police offices, accommodation and lockup facilities on the same site. Plans for a suitable court house with facilities for visiting magistrates and a Clerk of Petty Sessions were drawn up and the successful tender was that of contractors Edward and James Headland at £1875.

The courthouse was completed in May 1887, although the first court was held there on 24 January 1887 reflecting the urgency of the need. The use of corrugated iron as wall cladding reflects local conditions where suitable timber was scarce and voracious termites made keeping buildings in good repair a constant problem. Croydon had the services of a visiting mining warden from Georgetown from 1886 and it was clear that provision would need to be made for an office in the town. It was common for wardens to have offices in the court building and soon after completion, the court was extended by adding offices for the Mining Warden and Registrar. This raised the final cost of the work to £2075. Additional cells and stables for police horses were added to the police reserve about the same time as the demand for police services grew. The district was first proclaimed the Division of Croydon (an early form of local government) in 1887/88 and declared a municipality in 1892. A new police barracks were built in 1896 and further cells in the following year. In the first ten years of its existence the population of the town had mushroomed and by 1897 Croydon had the third highest population in North Queensland after that of Townsville and Charters Towers. The police and court buildings and the town hall along the main street illustrate the way in which administrative services were provided for towns in such rapid growth areas.

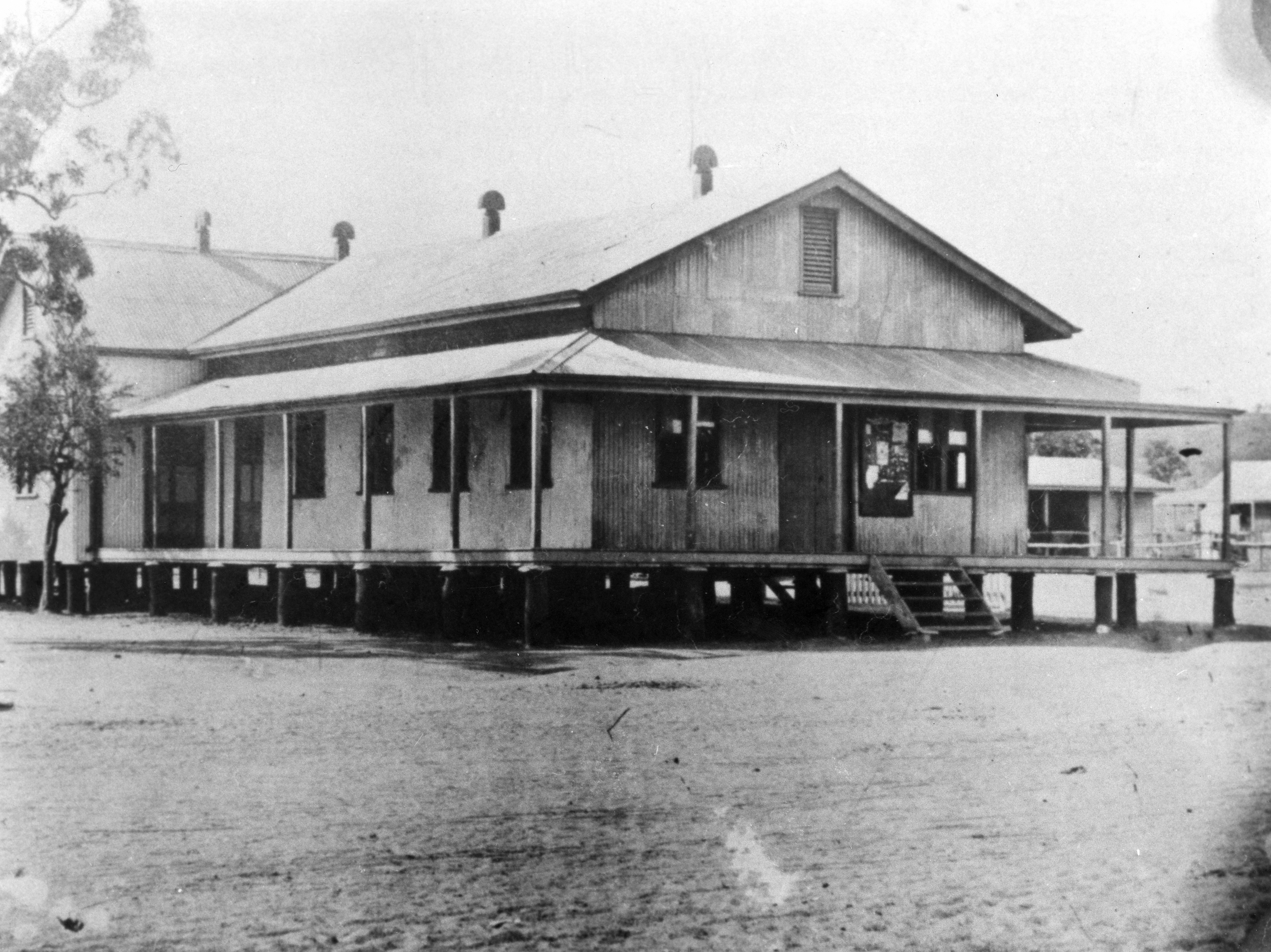
Court House, circa 1900

1897 was also the year in which a disastrous fire that destroyed much of the town's centre possibly marked the beginning of a decline in its fortunes. Unlike Charters Towers, the Croydon field did not prove to have the deep reefs that would have provided work for large numbers and the population consequently fell. The district was redesignated as Shire of Croydon in 1903–1904 and by 1907 the field was considered to be effectively exhausted. The town became the centre of a pastoral district rather than a goldfield and by 1912 the gold warden's offices were being used by a surveyor and his assistant. Following World War I, when mining generally diminished and the price of gold dropped, it was obvious that the field would not recover. Mining came to a virtual stop by 1925. The last court was held in 1926 and rooms at the rear of the building were used for storage, though the Clerk of Petty Sessions maintained an office into the 1940s.

By 1961 the building was abandoned and had deteriorated. It was purchased on 13 June 1961 by the Croydon Shire Council. National Estate funding was obtained to preserve the building and major repair work was carried out in 1980. Since then the building has been a tourist attraction in the town as have the other buildings from Croydon's heyday. Stage one of a project to interpret the building as a courthouse museum was implemented in 1999.

== Description ==
The Croydon Courthouse is a single storey building on low stumps and faces Samwell Street, the main street of Croydon. To one side of it are the former police buildings and on the other, former town hall.

The court house has a timber frame and is clad with vertical corrugated iron. The gabled roof is also clad with corrugated iron. A verandah with a separate awning supported on posts runs around three sides of the court room. The main entrance is central and approached by low steps. Behind the court room and set at right angles to it are a series of 3 gabled sections containing offices. They are similar in form and set parallel to each other. The first two sections are separated from each other by a corridor roofed in curved corrugated iron and have a verandah to the rear. Behind this are a pair of offices with a space between them which allows entry to the rear verandah. Windows in the end walls have sun hoods and ventilation has been addressed by providing louvred panels in the upper section of end walls and ventilators on the roof.

The courtroom has a coved roof and is well illuminated by windows at the front and sides. It is unlined, revealing the corrugated iron cladding except for the partition wall behind the bench, which is of horizontal timber boards. The court room retains its furniture, including the judge's bench, defendant's box, witness stand and jury bench.

== Heritage listing ==
The former Court House was listed on the Queensland Heritage Register on 21 October 1992 having satisfied the following criteria.

The place is important in demonstrating the evolution or pattern of Queensland's history.

Croydon Court House is important in illustrating the development of Croydon and district, reflecting the importance of the town following the discovery of gold and way in which justice was administered in such remote areas. It also demonstrates the short lived importance that goldfields, such as that at Croydon, might have.

The place is important in demonstrating the principal characteristics of a particular class of cultural places.

The Court house is a good example of a small regional courthouse of its era, having a large court room with offices for magistrates and court officials to the rear. The addition of offices for mining officials is typical of court houses in mining areas.

The place is important because of its aesthetic significance.

It is one of a series of public buildings along the main street of Croydon, including the police station and residence and the shire hall, which define the visual character of the township.

The place has a strong or special association with a particular community or cultural group for social, cultural or spiritual reasons.

The Croydon Court House has had a long connection with the people of Croydon and the surrounding district as the focus for the administration of justice.
