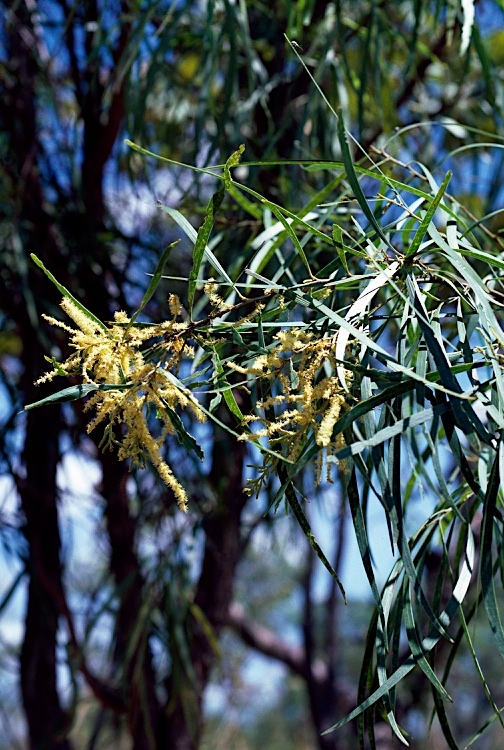
- Subsp. plectocarpa

Scientific classification
- Kingdom: Plantae
- Clade: Embryophytes
- Clade: Tracheophytes
- Clade: Spermatophytes
- Clade: Angiosperms
- Clade: Eudicots
- Clade: Rosids
- Order: Fabales
- Family: Fabaceae
- Subfamily: Caesalpinioideae
- Clade: Mimosoid clade
- Genus: Acacia
- Species: A. plectocarpa

Binomial name
- Acacia plectocarpa Benth.
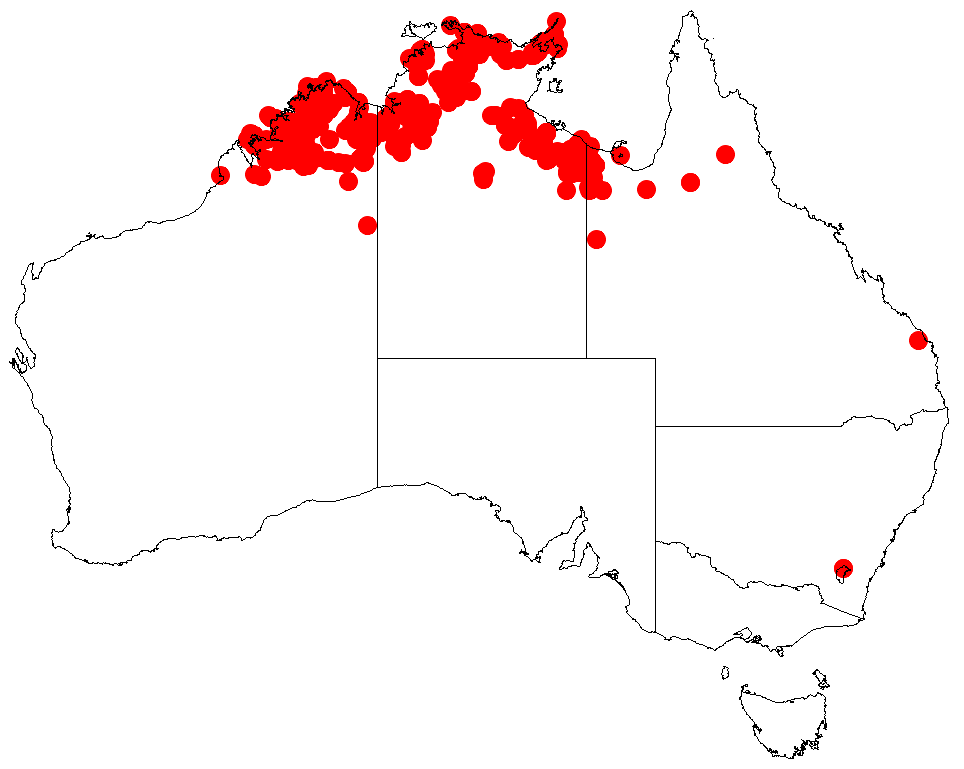
- Occurrence data from AVH

= Acacia plectocarpa =

Species of legume

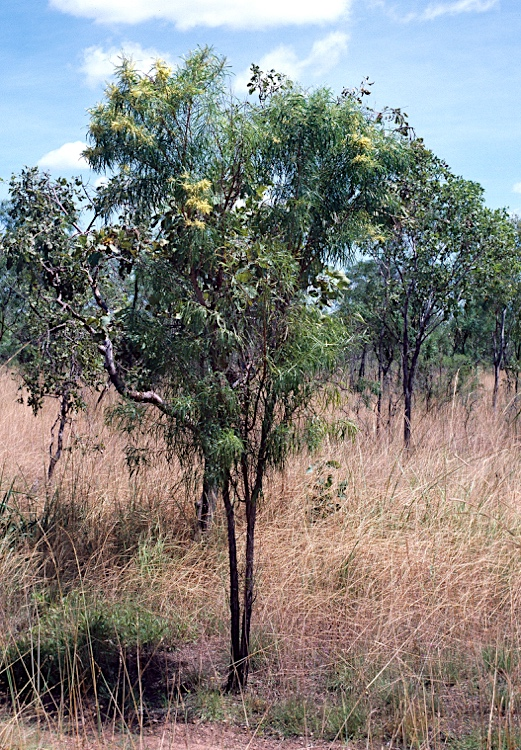
Habit in Kakadu National Park

Acacia plectocarpa is a tree or shrub belonging to the genus Acacia and the subgenus Juliflorae that is endemism to north western Australia.

== Description ==
The often spindly tree or shrub typically grows to a height of 2 to 10 metres (7 to 33 ft) but can reach up to 13 m (43 ft) It usually has a single stem with flakey or fissured bark that is grey to black in colour. The glabrous angular branchlets are yellowish to brown in colour and usually resinous. Like most species of Acacia it has phyllodes rather than leaves. The thinly coriaceous, glabrous and evergreen phyllodes have a linear to narrowly elliptic shape and are flat and straight to slightly curved. The phyllodes have a length of 9 to 26 cm (3.5 to 10.2 in) and a width of 1.5 to 14 mm (0.059 to 0.551 in) and have appressed hairs on nerves and margins with a midnerve and two more prominent secondary nerves. It blooms from March to June producing yellow flowers.

== Distribution ==
It is native to a large area in the Northern Territory and the Kimberley region of Western Australia where it is found to grow in a variety of habitats.

== See also ==
- List of Acacia species
