= Monochelus formosus =

Scientific classification
- Kingdom: Animalia
- Phylum: Arthropoda
- Class: Insecta
- Order: Coleoptera
- Suborder: Polyphaga
- Infraorder: Scarabaeiformia
- Family: Scarabaeidae
- Genus: Monochelus
- Species: M. formosus

Binomial name
- Monochelus formosus Burmeister, 1844

Species of beetle

Monochelus formosus is a species of beetle of the family Scarabaeidae. It is found in South Africa (Cape).

== Description ==
Adults reach a length of about 7–7.5 mm (0.28–0.30 in). Males are black, or very dark fuscous brown. The pronotum has three bands of whitish or sub-flavescent scales and the scutellum and elytra are sprinkled with similar scales, which also edge the abdominal segments and the metasternum. The head is very rugose and the pronotum is scarcely pubescent but has some stiff, long setae along the anterior and lateral margins. The scutellum is partly covered with elongate scales, and those on the elytra are somewhat scattered, but are still somewhat seriate. The propygidium and pygidium are without scales and nearly glabrous. Females are light chocolate-brown and entirely clothed on the upper side with appressed, very closely set, squamiform greyish hairs which are, however, somewhat flavescent in the median groove. The hairs on the pygidial part are similar to those on the elytra, but those that cover the whole of the under side are more scale-like.
