= Paddy melon =

Paddy melon is a common name for two species of plants in the melon family which are invasive in Australia:

- Citrullus lanatus, a sprawling plant with fruits much larger than a golf ball, a weedy form of the cultivated watermelon
- Cucumis myriocarpus, a sprawling plant with fruits smaller than a golf ball. Cucumis myriocarpus, is a summer weed belonging to the cucurbit family, is an annual plant that commonly invades fallow fields and pastures. Its presence leads to a decrease in moisture levels available for winter cereal crops, resulting in diminished crop yields and lower pasture quality.
