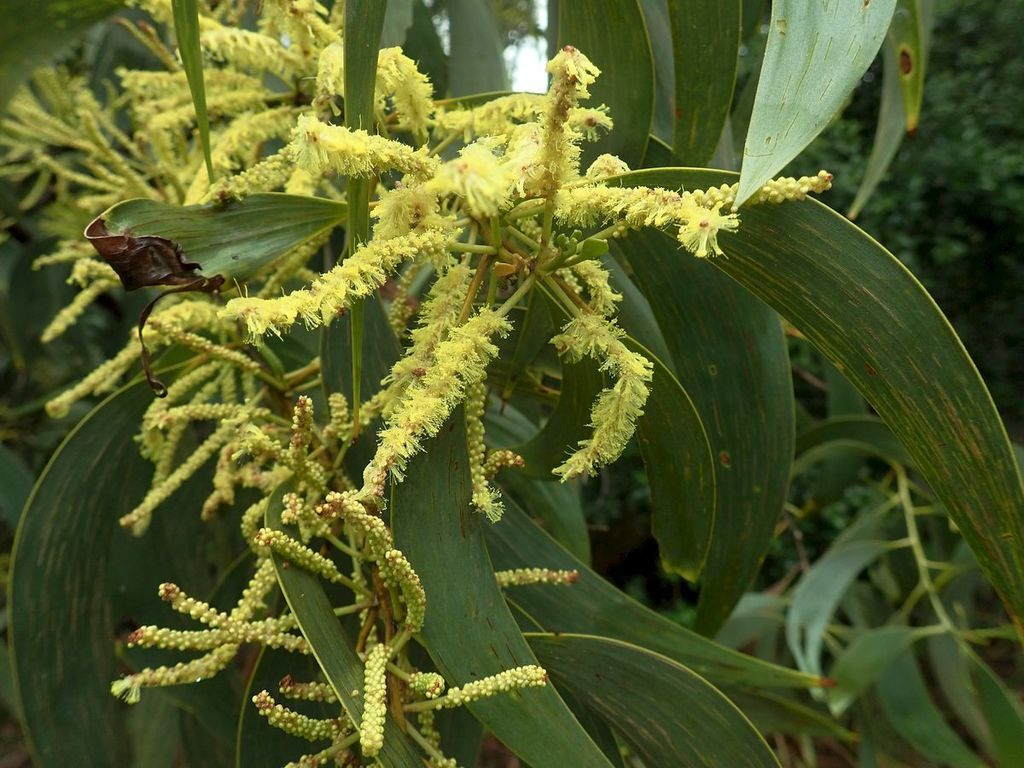
- Near Yorkeys Knob

Conservation status
- Least Concern (IUCN 3.1)

Scientific classification
- Kingdom: Plantae
- Clade: Tracheophytes
- Clade: Angiosperms
- Clade: Eudicots
- Clade: Rosids
- Order: Fabales
- Family: Fabaceae
- Subfamily: Caesalpinioideae
- Clade: Mimosoid clade
- Genus: Acacia
- Species: A. crassicarpa

Binomial name
- Acacia crassicarpa A.Cunn. ex Benth.
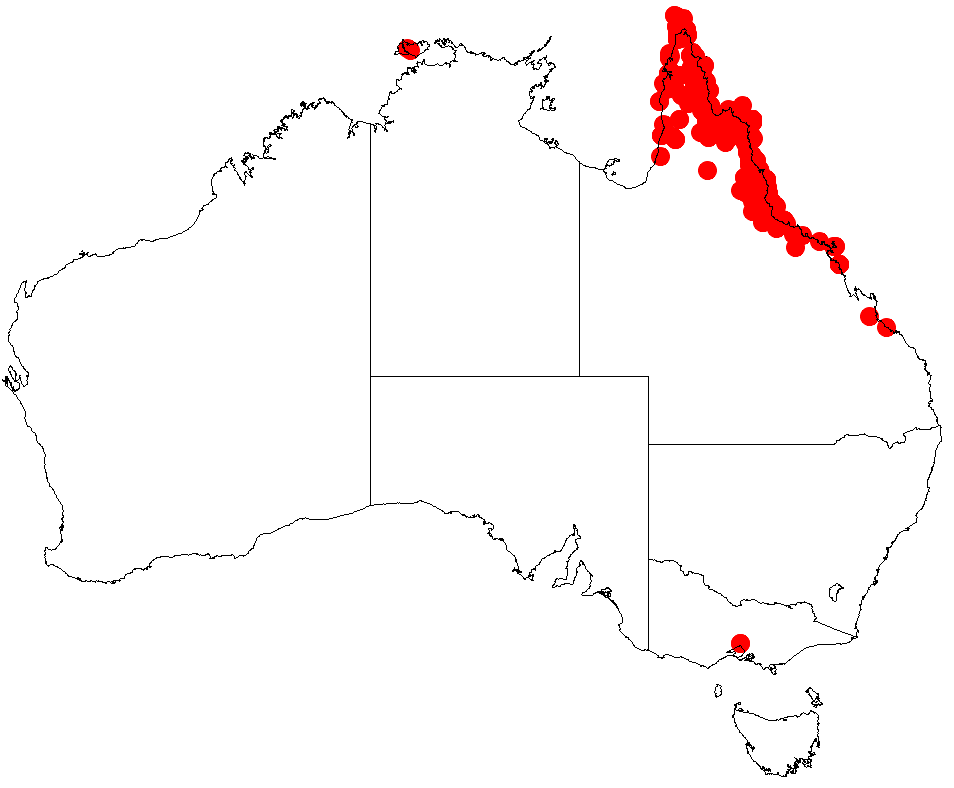
- Occurrence data from AVH

= Acacia crassicarpa =

Northern wattle

Species of legume

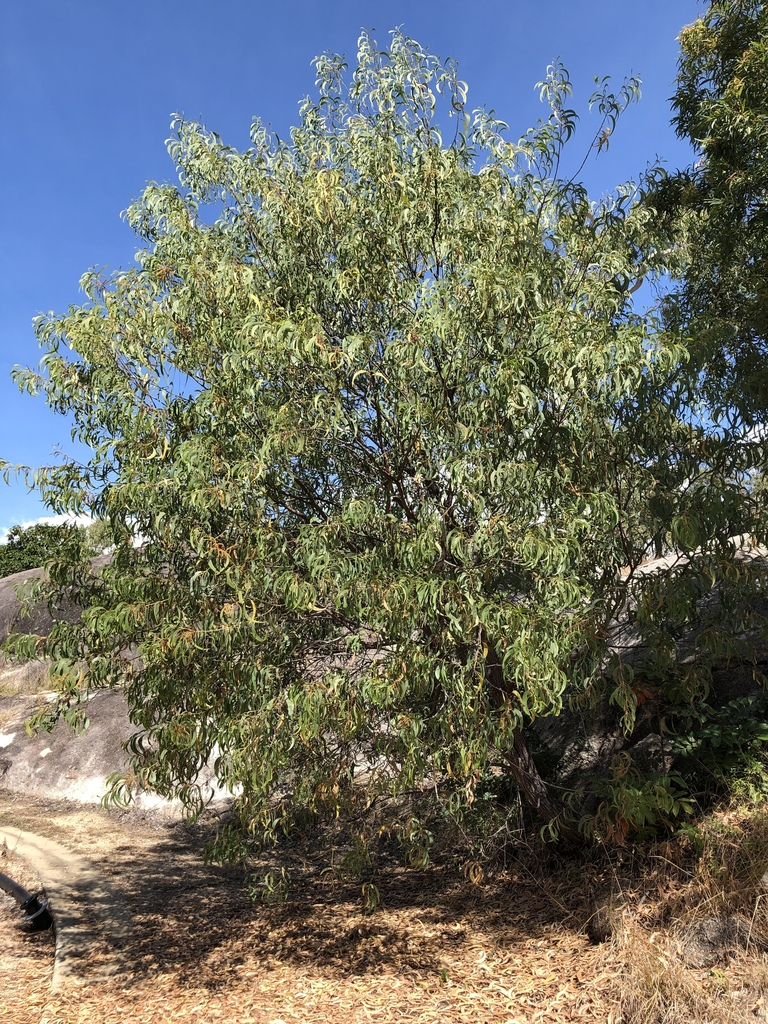
Habit near Cape Cleveland

Acacia crassicarpa, commonly known as thick-podded salwood, lancewood, northern golden wattle or northern wattle, is a species of flowering plant in the family Fabaceae and is native to Queensland, Australia and New Guinea. It is a tree with lance-shaped, more or less sickle-shaped phyllodes, spikes of pale to light golden yellow flowers and flat, narrowly oblong to oblong, winged pods.

== Description ==
Acacia crassicarpa is a tree that typically grows to a height of 6–25 m (20–82 ft) and has bark full of chinks, cracks, or crevices. Its branchlets are glabrous and slightly angular near the end. The phyllodes are lance-shaped to sickle-shaped, 80–270 mm (3.1–10.6 in) long, 10–45 mm (0.39–1.77 in) wide and leathery or thinly leathery, with many parallel veins, three veins more prominent than the rest. The flowers are pale yellow to light golden yellow and borne in spikes 30–70 mm (1.2–2.8 in) long. Flowering occurs between May and September, and the pods are flat, oblong to narrowly oblong, 40–120 mm (1.6–4.7 in) long, 20–45 mm (0.79–1.77 in) wide including the wing, more or less straight and sometimes spirally twisted. The seeds are oblong to egg-shaped, black, 5–6 mm (0.20–0.24 in) long with and aril 5–20 mm (0.20–0.79 in) long.

== Taxonomy ==
Acacia crassicarpa was first formally described by George Bentham in Hooker's London Journal of Botany from an unpublished manuscript by Allan Cunningham. The specific epithet (crassicarpa) means 'thick fruit', referring to the thick woody pods.

== Distribution and habitat ==
Thick-podded salwood grows in woodlands and open forest in sandy or rocky soils in tropical Queensland, the islands of Torres Strait and as far south as Townsville with disjunct populations on Whitsunday Island and near Mackay. It also occurs in Irian Jaya and Papua New Guinea.

== Conservation status ==
Acacia crassicarpa is listed as "not threatened" under the Government of Queensland Nature Conservation Act 1992.
