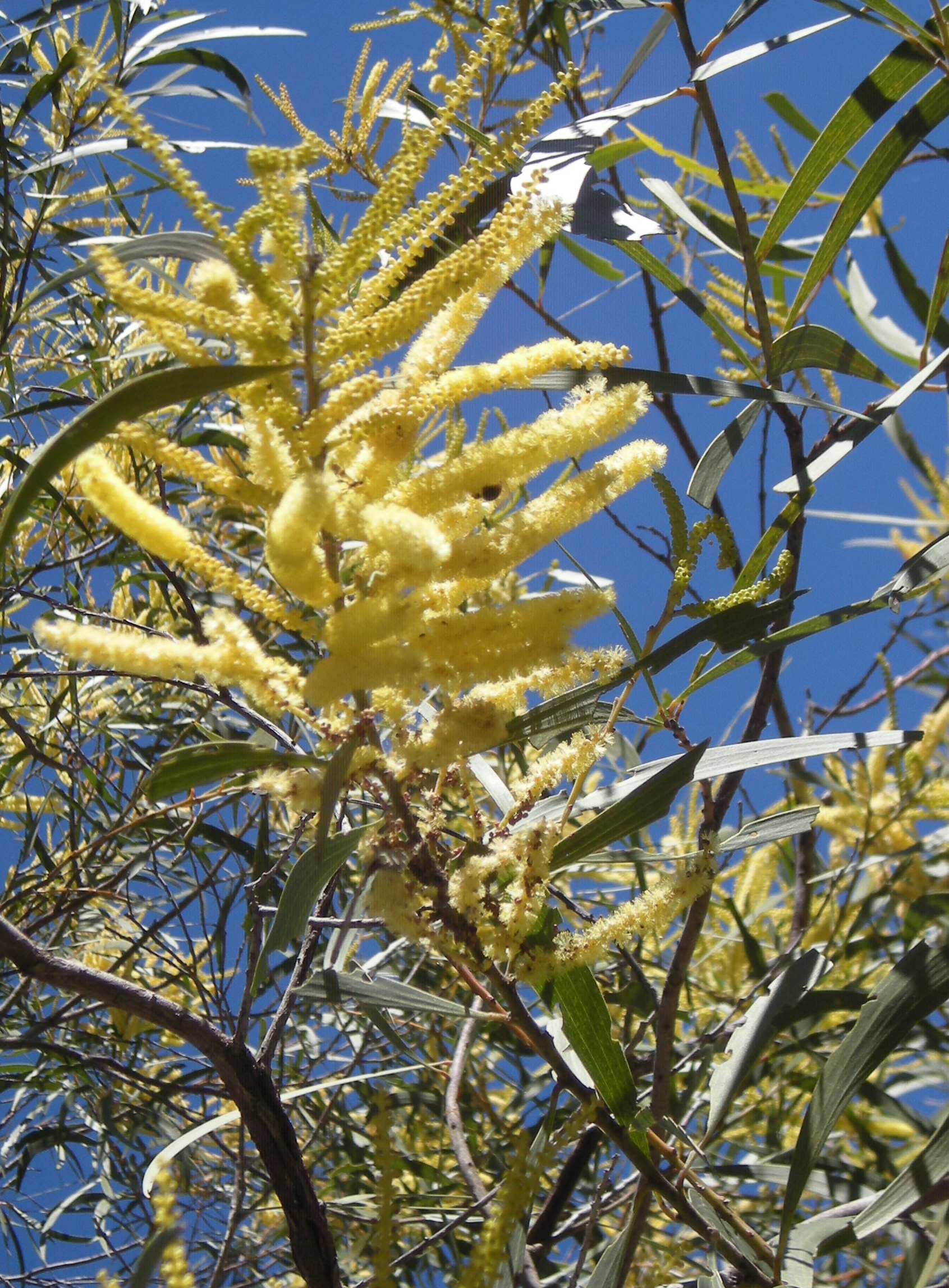

Conservation status
- Least Concern (IUCN 3.1)

Scientific classification
- Kingdom: Plantae
- Clade: Tracheophytes
- Clade: Angiosperms
- Clade: Eudicots
- Clade: Rosids
- Order: Fabales
- Family: Fabaceae
- Subfamily: Caesalpinioideae
- Clade: Mimosoid clade
- Genus: Acacia
- Species: A. aulacocarpa

Binomial name
- Acacia aulacocarpa A.Cunn. ex Benth.
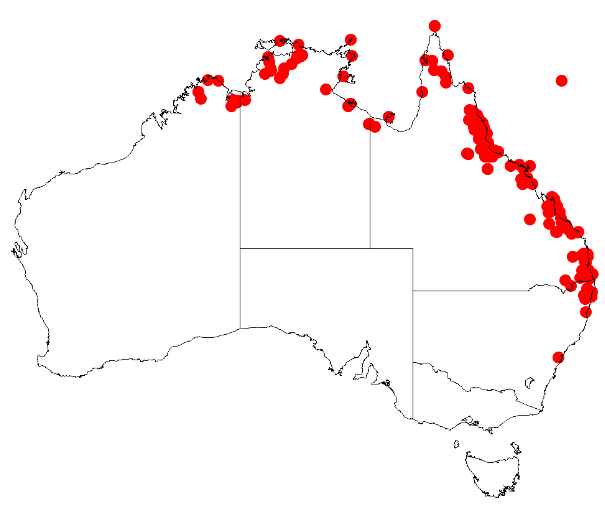
- Occurrence data from AVH

Synonyms
- Acacia aulacocarpa subsp. E p.p.; Acacia aulacocarpa A.Cunn. ex Benth. var. aulacocarpa; Acacia aulacocarpa var. fruticosa C.T.White; Acacia leptophleba Benth. nom. inval., pro syn.; Racosperma aulacocarpum (A.Cunn. ex Benth.) Pedley; Racosperma aulacocarpum var. fruticosum (C.T.White) Pedley

= Acacia aulacocarpa =

Species of legume

Acacia aulacocarpa, commonly known as Papua New Guinea brown wattle, New Guinea wattle, golden-flowered salwood or lancewood, is a species of flowering plant in the family Fabaceae and is native to New Guinea, Queensland and New South Wales. It is a shrub or tree, with elliptic to narrowly elliptic phyllodes, cylindrical heads of bright golden-yellow flowers, and narrowly oblong pods up to 80 mm (3.1 in) long.

== Description ==
Acacia aulacocarpa grows as a shrub with a height of 0.5 to 2 m (1 ft 8 in to 6 ft 7 in) or as a small tree with a typical height of 2 to 8 m (6 ft 7 in to 26 ft 3 in) but can reach heights of up to 15 m (49 ft). The bark is smooth, or cracked with shallow fissures on the largest trees. The phyllodes are dimidiate to more or less sickle-shaped, mostly 50–125 mm (2.0–4.9 in) long, 7–35 mm (0.28–1.38 in) wide, thinly leathery, glabrous and more or less glaucous. The flowers are bright golden-yellow and borne in one or two cylindrical spikes 20–50 mm (0.79–1.97 in) long on a peduncle 4–8 mm (0.16–0.31 in) long. Flowering occurs between January and June and the pods are narrowly oblong, sometimes twisted, 15–80 mm (0.59–3.15 in) long and usually 8–15 mm (0.31–0.59 in) wide, containing brown to black seeds 3.5–5 mm (0.14–0.20 in) long with a greyish-cream aril.

== Taxonomy ==
The species was first formally described in 1842 by George Bentham, from an unpublished description by Allan Cunningham in the London Journal of Botany from specimens collected at Bowen. The specific epithet (aulocarpa) means 'furrow-fruit', referring to the markings on the pods.

== Distribution ==
Acacia aulacocarpa has a discontinuous distribution, mainly in coastal areas and nearby tablelands from near Daintree to near Brisbane in Queensland, and near Grafton in New South Wales. It grows in clay or loam along watercourses, in sandy soil on rocky outcrops in forest and shrubland or in woodland on sandstone.

== Gallery ==
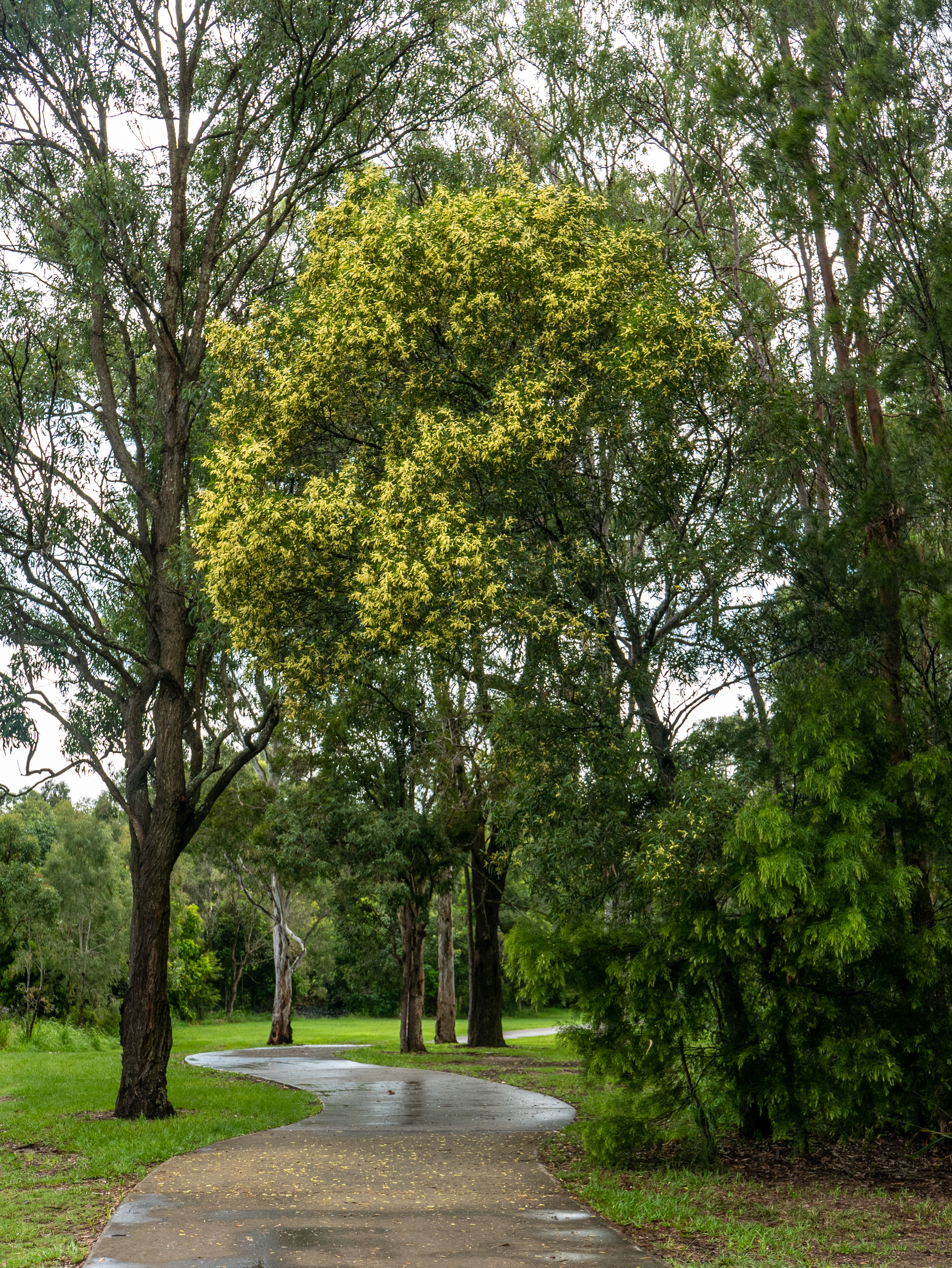
Acacia aulacocarpa flowering, 7th Brigade Park, Chermside, Queensland

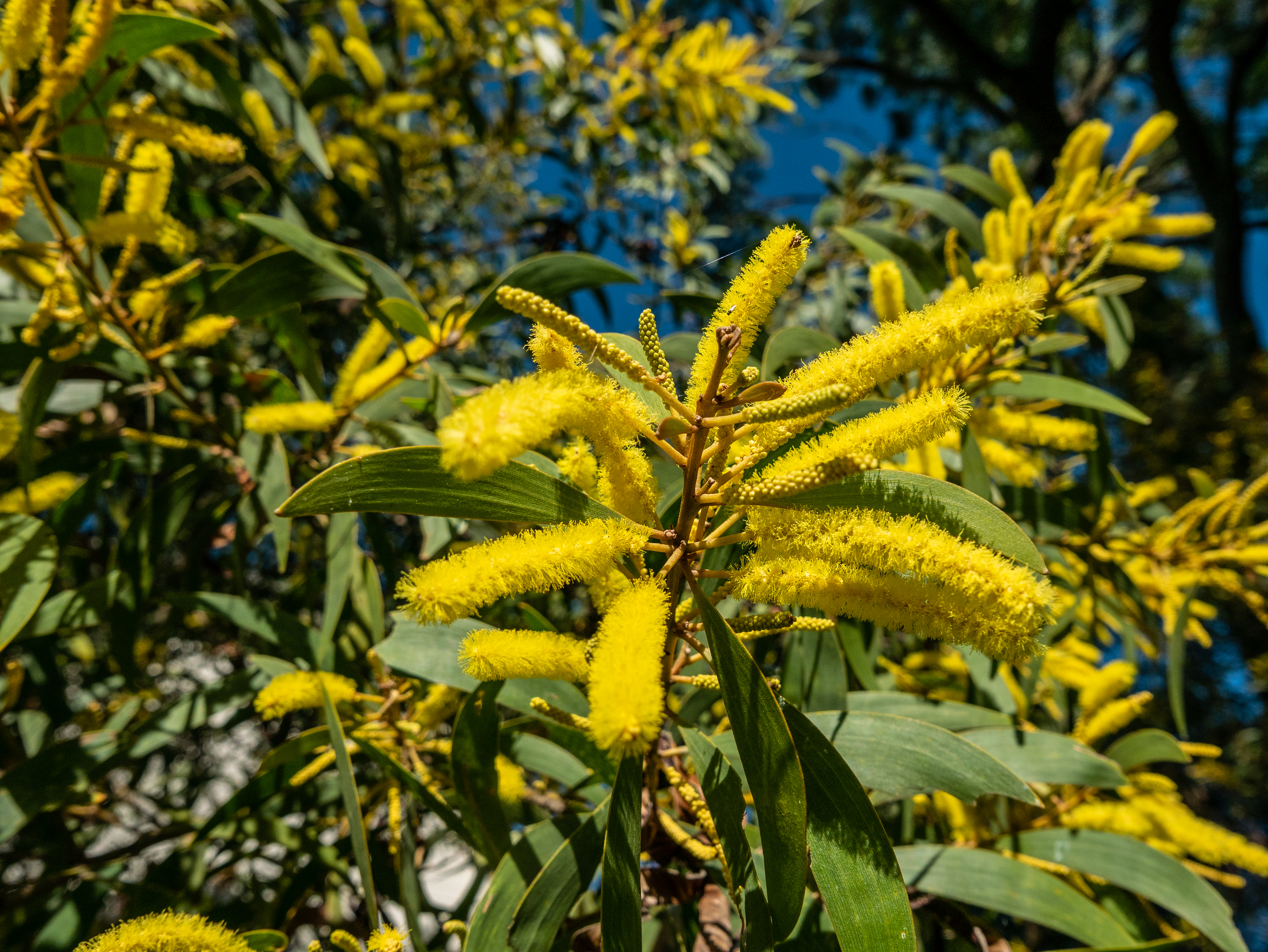
Inflorescences

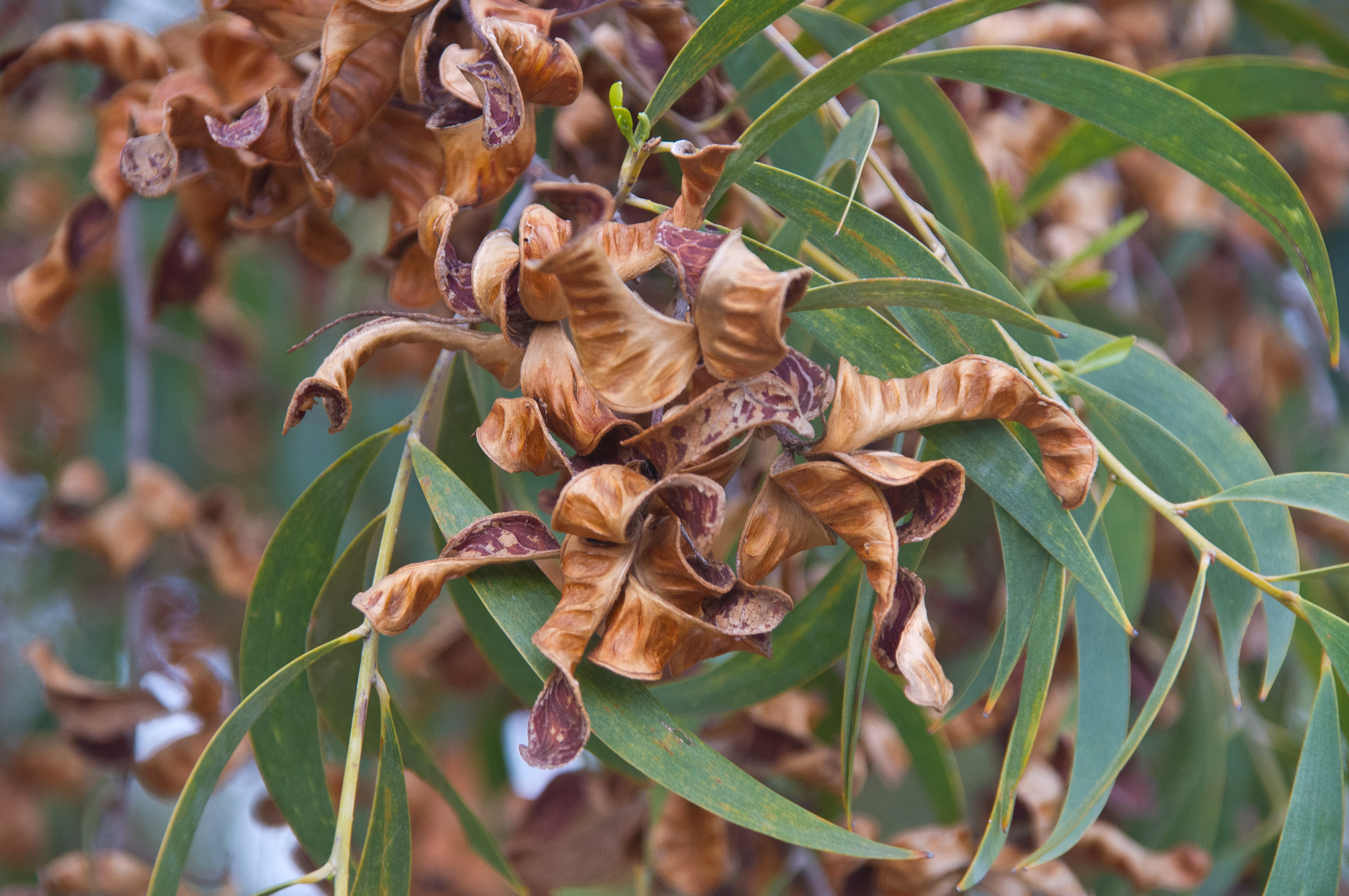
Pods

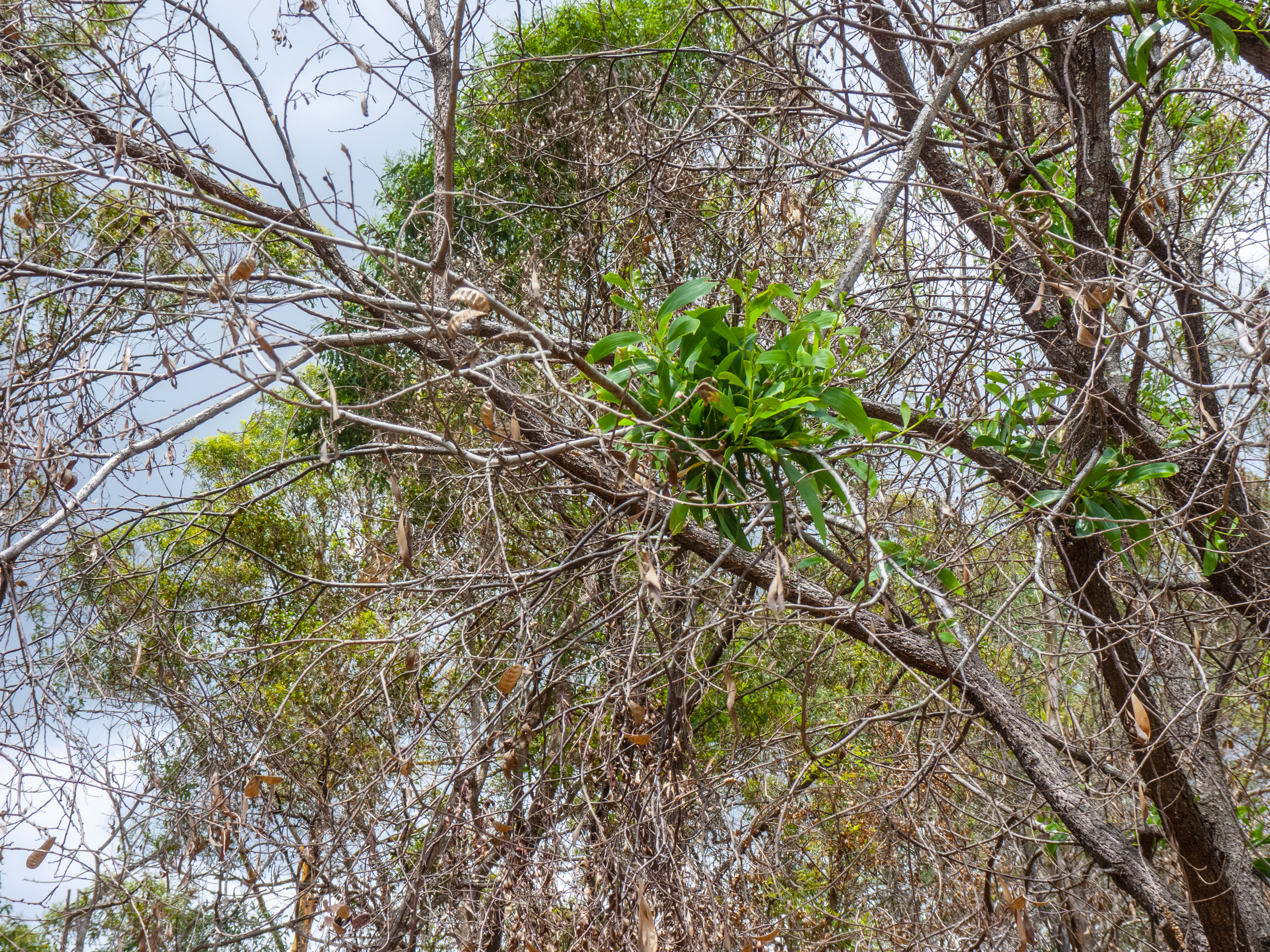
Sprouting from epicormic buds after controlled burn-off

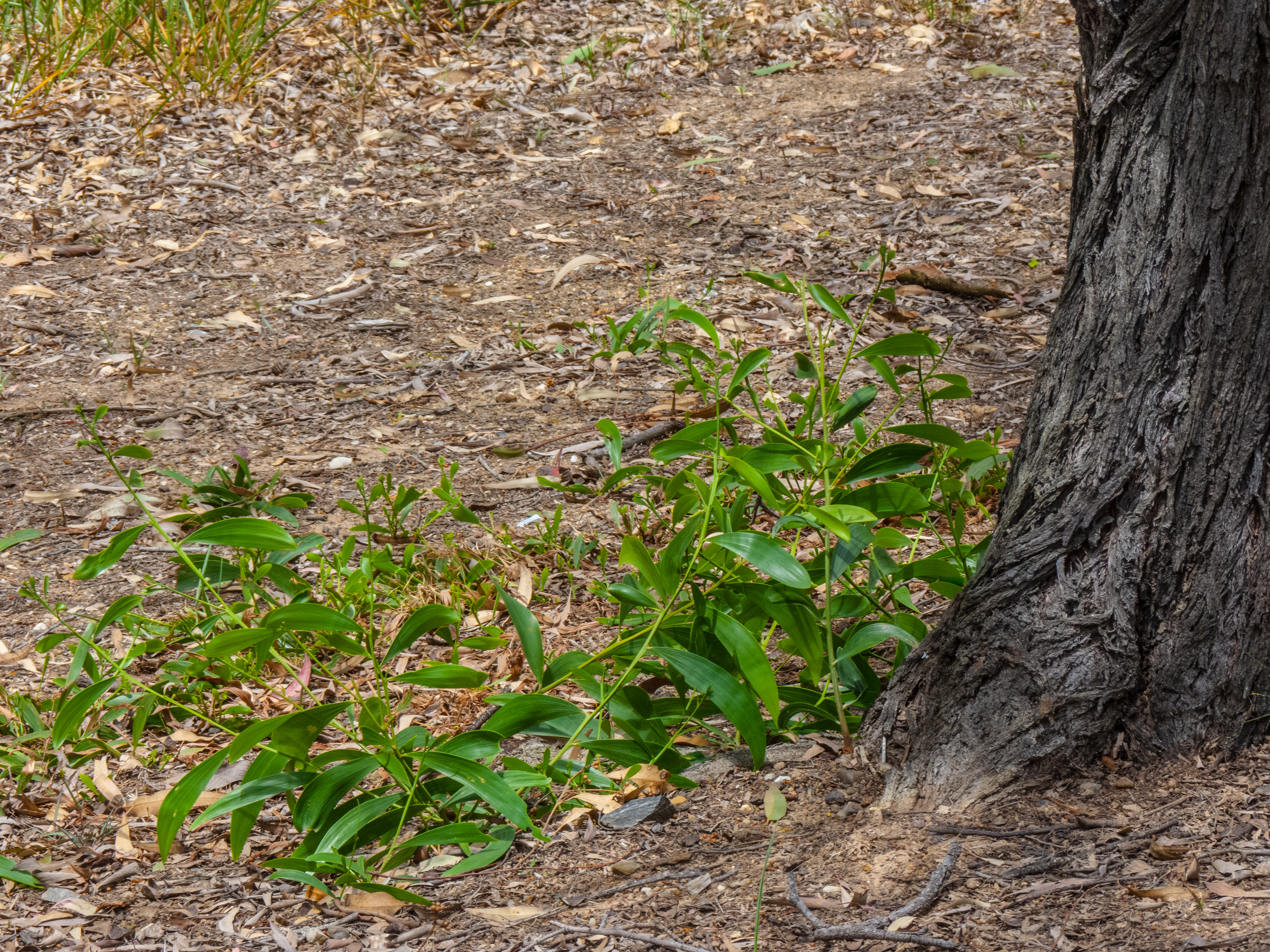
Sprouting from root suckers after a controlled burn-off

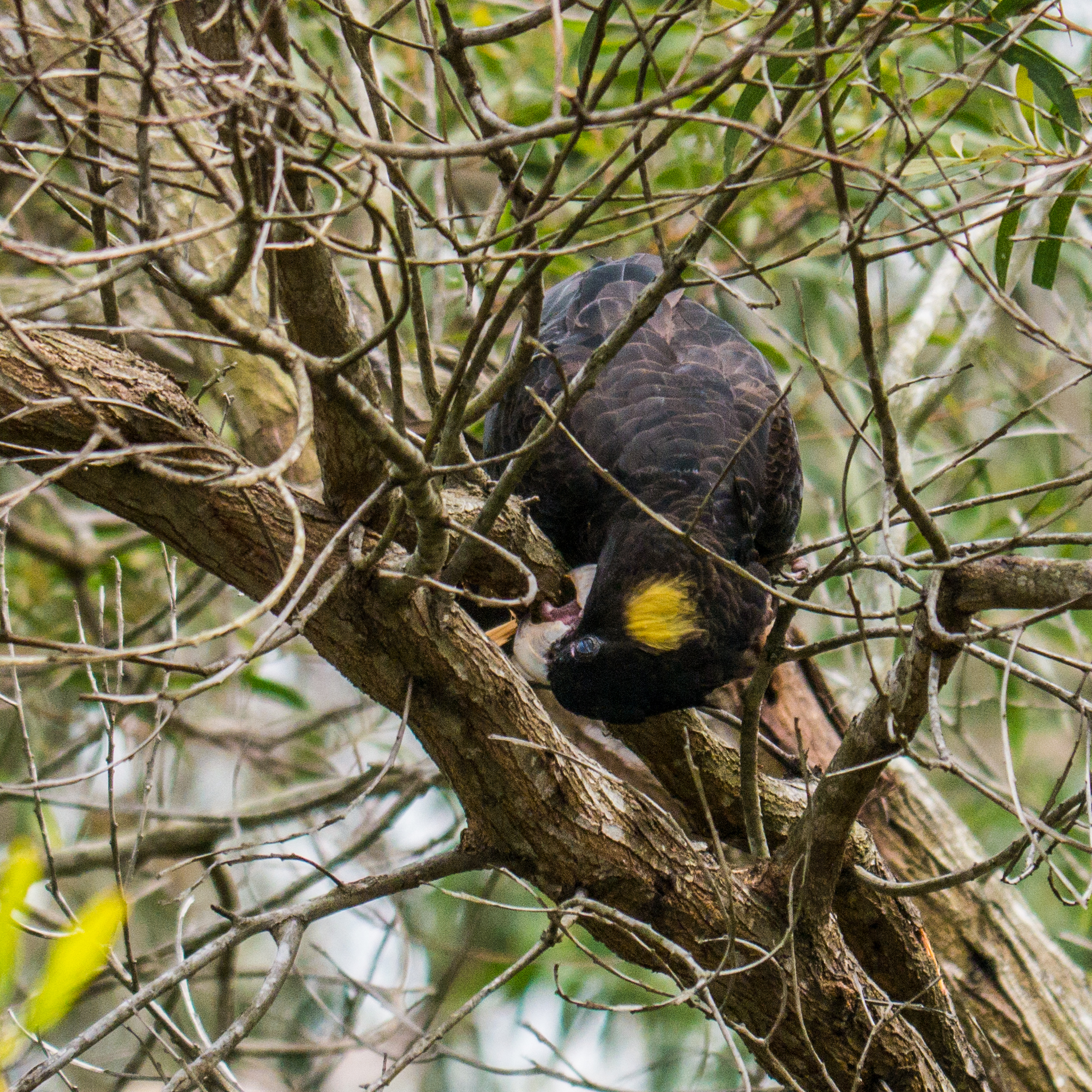
Yellow-tailed black-cockatoo searching for insect larvae under A. aulacocarpa bark

== See also ==
- List of Acacia species
