= Monochelus laetus =

Scientific classification
- Kingdom: Animalia
- Phylum: Arthropoda
- Class: Insecta
- Order: Coleoptera
- Suborder: Polyphaga
- Infraorder: Scarabaeiformia
- Family: Scarabaeidae
- Genus: Monochelus
- Species: M. laetus

Binomial name
- Monochelus laetus Péringuey, 1902

Species of beetle

Monochelus laetus is a species of beetle of the family Scarabaeidae. It is found in South Africa (KwaZulu-Natal).

== Description ==
Adults reach a length of about 5–7.5 mm (0.20–0.30 in). Males have a black head and pronotum, while the elytra and legs are light brownish red. The head and pronotum are covered with minute, nearly contiguous flavescent scales leaving a narrow longitudinal band on each side of the deep median groove partly denuded, and also a similar but shorter space midway between the first discoidal space and the outer margin. The elytra are densely scaly but with three narrow denuded bands, the two outer ones reach from the base to the apex, but the first dorsal one reaches only to about the median part. The scales are whiter than those on the pronotum and larger, and the denuded bands are not always very well defined. The pygidium is non-squamose, and the edge of the propygidium, the abdomen, and the pectus are very densely scaly. Females are similar to males, but the scales on the pronotum are more hair-like, the scales on the elytra are a little deeper yellow and form two distinct dorsal bands, and the pygidium is covered with appressed squamose hairs.
