= Croydon Cemetery, Queensland =

Cemetery in Australia

Croydon Cemetery
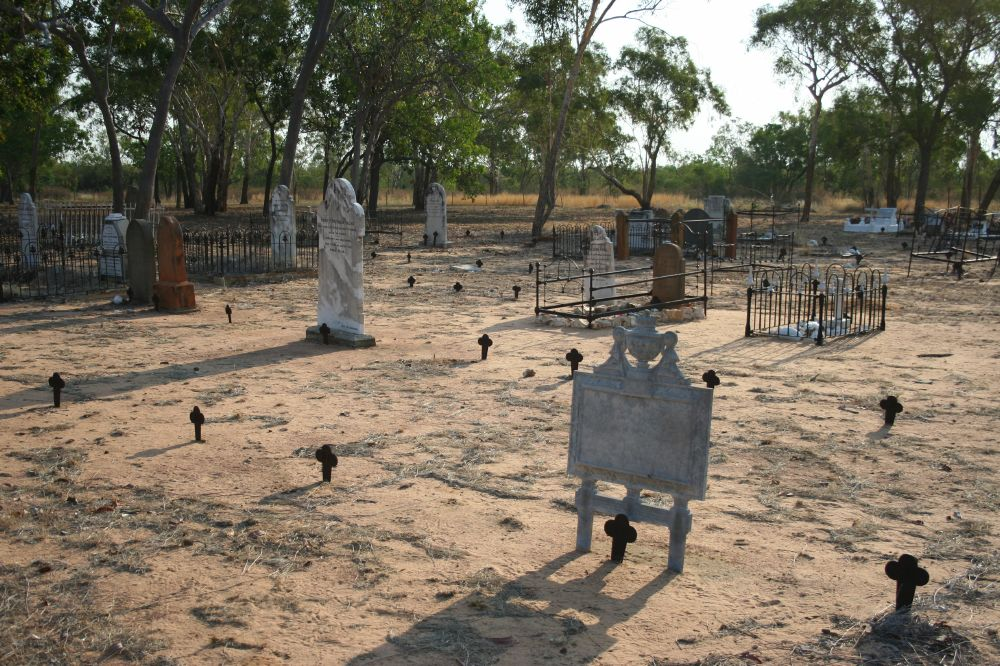
- Croydon Cemetery, 2011

- Location within Queensland Location within Australia
- 18.2225°S 142.244°E
- Location: Julia Creek Road, Croydon, Shire of Croydon, Queensland, Australia

History
- Design period: 1870s–1890s (late 19th century)
- Built: c. 1889

Queensland Heritage Register
- Official name: Croydon Cemetery
- Type: state heritage (built)
- Designated: 25 October 2002
- Reference no.: 602376
- Significant period: c. 1889–ongoing (fabric, historical use)
- Significant components: headstone, grave surrounds/railings, fence/wall – perimeter, gate – entrance, grave surrounds – iron bedstead/s, grave marker, burial/grave

Croydon Cemetery is a heritage-listed cemetery at Julia Creek Road, Croydon, Shire of Croydon, Queensland, Australia. It was opened c. 1889. It was added to the Queensland Heritage Register on 25 October 2002.

== History ==
The main Croydon Cemetery is one of at least 10 cemeteries which served the Croydon area after it was declared a goldfield in 1886. Cemetery Reserve R16 was surveyed in September 1888 by W.A. Irwin, gazetted in 1889, but was probably in use earlier than this. It was the second cemetery surveyed close to Croydon township, and is the only one in the district still currently used. The Croydon field was the last of the north Queensland gold rushes of the nineteenth century. After a peak in gold production in 1900, mining declined over the next two decades. There was a small revival during the 1930s depression and again from 1988 to 1991. The present population of the district is approximately 300.

Croydon is approximately 110 miles (180 km) west of Georgetown and 90 miles (140 km) south east of the port of Normanton on the Gulf of Carpentaria. Europeans first explored this area in the 1860s. John McKinlay searched for lost explorers Burke and Wills in 1862. John Graham MacDonald explored a route from Carpentaria Downs to the Gulf in 1864. H.E. Young investigated routes for an overland telegraph line between Cardwell and Normanton, which was built between 1869 and 1872, and later became a lifeline for the northern mining fields. Pastoralists followed these early explorers, bringing sheep in 1865, but by 1867 many had retreated because of fever, drought, low wool prices and distance from markets.

Gold was first discovered on Croydon Downs Station which had been taken up by W.C. Brown in 1881. In the latter part of 1883, two of his employees James and Walter Alldridge found a leader of quartz carrying gold. However it was not until 1885 that Richard and Walter Alldridge, acting under instructions from W.C. Brown, prospected the area and discovered twenty payable reefs. The finds were reported in October 1885, and the Croydon area was proclaimed a goldfield on 18 January 1886, thus coming under administration of the Mines Department. W.C. Brown and the Alldridge brothers shared a £1000 reward for the discovery, and the reward claim, Lady Mary, was taken up by 6 partners including W.C. Brown and Richard Alldridge.

Hundreds of people flocked to the area. By 1887, total population of the district had peaked at 7000, and by 1897 it still had the third highest population in north Queensland after Charters Towers and Townsville. From 1890 to 1910, gold output from the Croydon reefs were second only to Charters Towers. Total production from inception until 1947 was 772,374 ounces (21,896,400 g). By 1909 however, production began to decline and by 1914, the population at the turn of the century had halved. There was a small revival during the 1930s Depression, and around Tabletop and Golden Gate between 1988 and 1991.

Residents on the Croydon goldfields faced many hardships from inadequate supplies of water; pasture grasses and timber for fuel and construction purposes. Isolation was also a major problem until the Croydon to Normanton railway was completed in 1891. The area was subject to droughts and floods, and even a cyclone in 1906. Industrial action in 1888 resulted in the formation of a branch of the Amalgamated Miners' Association, and a strike occurred in 1889 when mining companies again tried to lower wages. Some mines close to Croydon township failed around 1890 when the ore was cut by a wall of granite. However, rich discoveries at Golden Gate to the north west compensated a little for this. A financial setback occurred in the "crash" of 1893, when most banks closed doors and gold buying ceased, throwing many miners out of work.

As on many other Queensland goldfields, Croydon had a Chinese community which developed on the north west fringe of the town. The community constructed a temple, houses and other facilities such as pig ovens. By the end of 1888 Mining Warden L.E.D. Towner reported that Croydon had a population of approximately 3500 of whom 300 were Chinese, Cingalese, Malays and African. It appears that a shifting population of around 300 Asians was maintained. This figure is surprising given that the Queensland Goldfields Amendment Act of 1878 excluded Chinese people from new fields for three years unless they had made the discovery. However it appears that their involvement at Croydon was primarily as gardeners, carriers and cooks. There was some racial tension at times. A race riot occurred in 1886 when a Chinese residence was pulled down. Also, in May 1888, William Hodgkinson, Minister for Mines, ejected all Chinese from the Croydon and Etheridge goldfields. However, they were soon allowed to return because their market gardens were essential to the well-being of the community.

Despite all difficulties, the 1890s were productive years for Croydon. Pugh's Almanac of 1900 listed 3 banks, 6 blacksmiths, 5 bakers, 6 commission agents, 4 newsagents, 6 carriers, 2 chemists, 6 drapers, 11 sharebrokers, 18 hotels and 4 watchmakers, among many other assorted businesses. Croydon became a municipality in 1892 under the control of the Croydon Divisional Board, and in 1907 administration passed to the Croydon Shire Council.

The fields developed with Croydon as the main administrative and commercial centre surrounded by "satellite" communities established at outlying reefs. Members of the outlying communities would visit Croydon on Saturday nights to shop, conduct their business and socialise. There were townships at Golden Gate, Tabletop, Gorge Creek, Golden Valley, Goldstone, Carron, Twelve Mile, and campsites at Homeward Bound, Croydon King, Mark Twain, Lower Twelve Miles, Mulligan's, Flanagan's, Morning Light, Moonstone and Alluvial Springs. This resulted in the establishment of at least 10 cemeteries throughout the district.

John Sircom first surveyed Croydon township in 1886 after the district had been proclaimed a goldfield. The main Croydon cemetery, Reserve R16, was surveyed in September 1888 by W.A. Irwin, gazetted in 1889, but was probably in use earlier than this. It was the second cemetery surveyed in close proximity to Croydon township, and is still currently used. Croydon Shire Council's Burial Register appears to refer only to this cemetery. The first documented burial in this register is that of F.W. Kennedy on 5 January 1889. The first marked grave after gazettal was probably for William Pascoe who died on 19 July 1889.

Seventy-four Chinese burials were registered in Croydon between 1889 and 1951, although there are possibly around 130 graves. On at least four occasions exhumations occurred. Two bodies were exhumed in 1907, one in 1909, nine in 1913 and one in 1915. These exhumations reflect the spiritual importance for the Chinese to return permanently to their ancestral homeland, but given this, the number of exhumations seems small.

The cemetery reveals a fairly high death rate in Croydon, especially among the young. Their iron bedsteads mark some children's graves. Miner's phthisis was also a common cause of death. Some headstones record that friends erected them, and this reflects the isolation of many from their families, and the poverty of some on the fields. A small number of headstones are surprisingly impressive and are representative of the wealth of the goldfield.

There is one Commonwealth war grave in the cemetery, of Lieutenant Alrey Fisher McMaster of the Australian Army, who died on 27 February 1947 aged 51 and is registered as a casualty of World War II.

As with many other north Queensland cemeteries Melrose and Fenwick produced the majority of the headstones. This firm started their Townsville operation about 1896–97, subsequently extending to Cairns (1908) and in 1915 to Charters Towers and Mackay.

Other stonemasons represented in the cemetery include John Petrie, Brisbane; J H Simmons, Brisbane; and E Greenway of Ipswich.

John Petrie was the son of Andrew Petrie, Forman for Public Works for the fledgling Colony of Moreton Bay, who is recognised for his contribution to the development of the early architecture of Brisbane. John, who assumed responsibility for his father's business in 1848, expanded the stonemasonry company to Charters Towers and Townsville in 1889.

John Howard Simmons is known to have worked from a Brisbane base from about 1883 to at least 1910. Simmons supplied headstones throughout Queensland and is regarded as one of the most productive stonemasons of his time.

Ipswich stonemason Ernest Greenway was a descendant of early colonial architect Francis Greenway who designed many of the public buildings in New South Wales during Lachlan Macquarie's time as Governor of New South Wales. Ernest Greenway learnt his trade in England and migrated to Queensland in 1882. He established a stonemasonry business in Nicholas Street, Ipswich. He later moved to Grey Street and finally to Limestone Street in 1891. His business functioned from the Limestone Street site until 1934.

== Description ==
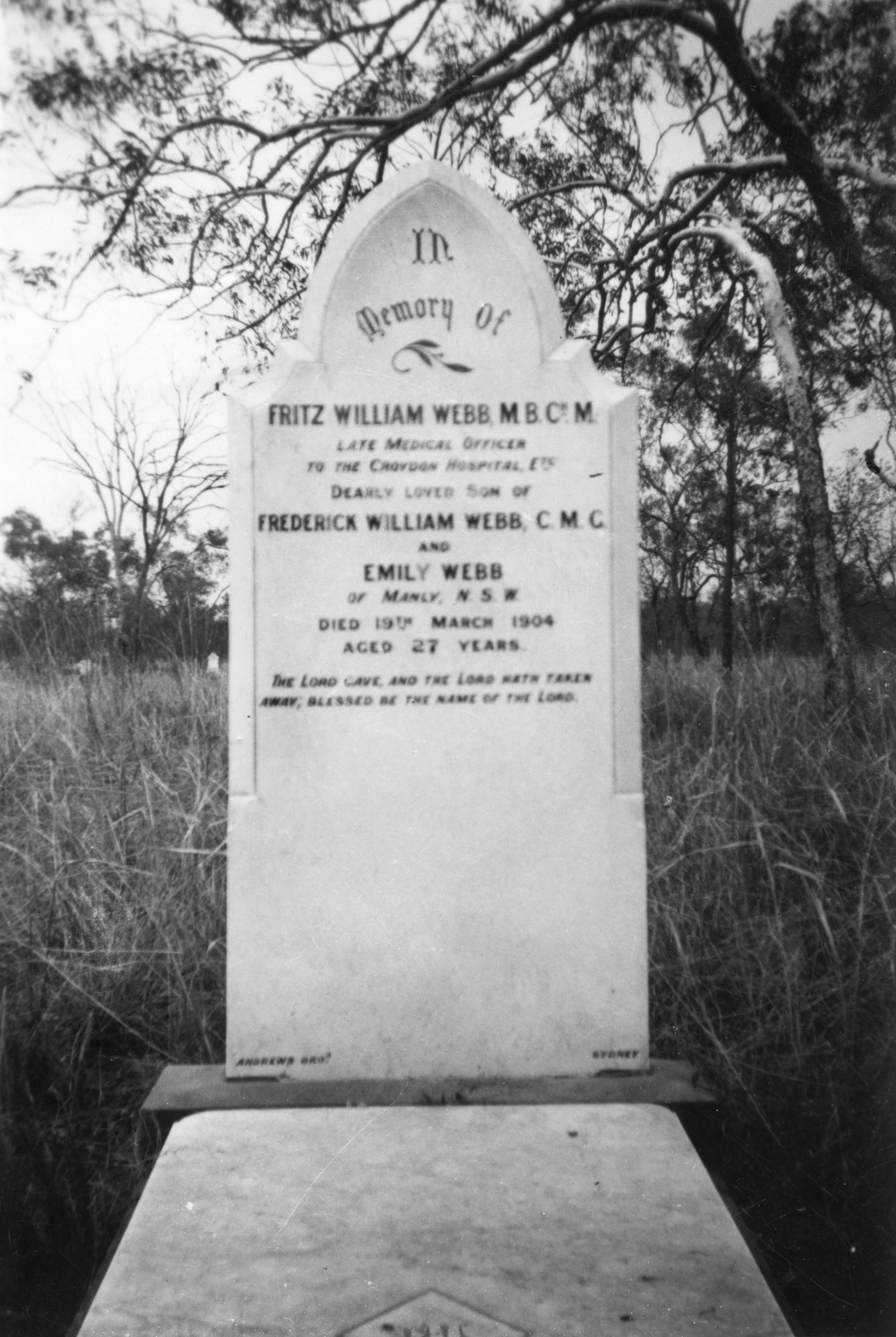
Headstone of Fritz William Webb in Croydon Cemetery

Croydon Cemetery, Reserve R16, comprises 4 hectares (9.9 acres) of land and is about 2 kilometres (1.2 mi) south of Croydon township. Access is via Julia Creek Road. A well maintained fence, with a single vehicle width gate and adjacent pedestrian gate, entirely encloses the cemetery.

The terrain is generally flat with fine grained sandy soils. The original survey plan noted sand with substratum of sandstone and drainage into Highland Mary Creek. The vegetation is predominantly natural, with eucalypts and other endemic tree species scattered through the site. Native grasses provide a dense cover most of the year. Native birds and animals utilise this habitat.

There is extensive use of soldered sheet metal grave markers. These were often three dimensional and filled with ceramic floral displays protected by glass panels. This practice appears to be confined to this cemetery.

The graves with headstones represent only a small proportion of burials in the cemetery. The variety of material used in headstones is varied and ranges from polished granite to marble, sandstone, sheet metal, cast iron, concrete and tiles. The headstones show several stages of decay with sandstone weathering and marble deteriorating in the tropical heat.

The more elaborate headstones generally relate to Catholic burials with simpler headstones on the Protestant graves. Some Chinese graves are marked with sandstone headstones and others with simple clay bricks. Many graves are surrounded with whatever materials were available including metal cots and iron railings.

== Heritage listing ==
Croydon Cemetery was listed on the Queensland Heritage Register on 25 October 2002 having satisfied the following criteria.

The place is important in demonstrating the evolution or pattern of Queensland's history.

The Croydon Cemetery, in use from the late 1880s, reflects the development of the region from that period to the present day. The cemetery is an important record of the cultural development of the area, showing the ethnicity, social attitudes to death, availability of materials, occupations and social status of the inhabitants of the Croydon Shire since settlement.

The place demonstrates rare, uncommon or endangered aspects of Queensland's cultural heritage.

Given the nineteenth century Chinese practice of exhumation and transfer of remains back to their homeland it is rare that there are intact Chinese burials in cemeteries on Queensland mining fields. Therefore, the surviving sandstone and small brick headstones at Croydon that denote intact burial sites are significant for their rarity. The uniqueness of the cemetery is further enhanced by the use of three dimensional "vases" as grave markers in the absence of headstones.

The place has potential to yield information that will contribute to an understanding of Queensland's history.

The cemetery has the potential to yield information in regards to the early history of the inhabitants of the Croydon goldfields, their ethnic, social and religious backgrounds and standing within the community. The economic and social history of the district can be read through the inscriptions and type of material used in headstones. Nationality, health, social status, lodge affiliation, occupation, religion and cause of death are often included in the inscriptions. Family relationships can be noted and the high infant mortality and death in childbirth are often recorded. The large number of single graves is illustrative of the hardship and isolation of pioneering life in north west Queensland.

The place is important in demonstrating the principal characteristics of a particular class of cultural places.

The work of a number of significant Queensland monumental firms is evident in this cemetery including that of Melrose and Fenwick of Townsville, Ernest Greenway of Ipswich and that of J Petrie and JH Simmons of Brisbane.

The place has a strong or special association with a particular community or cultural group for social, cultural or spiritual reasons.

The cemetery is significant for its high spiritual and symbolic value to the community because of its continuity of use as a burial place for the region for one hundred and ten odd years. The regard for the cemetery is evidenced by the Croydon Shire Council's funding of a conservation plan and ongoing maintenance of the cemetery.
