= Old Croydon Cemetery =

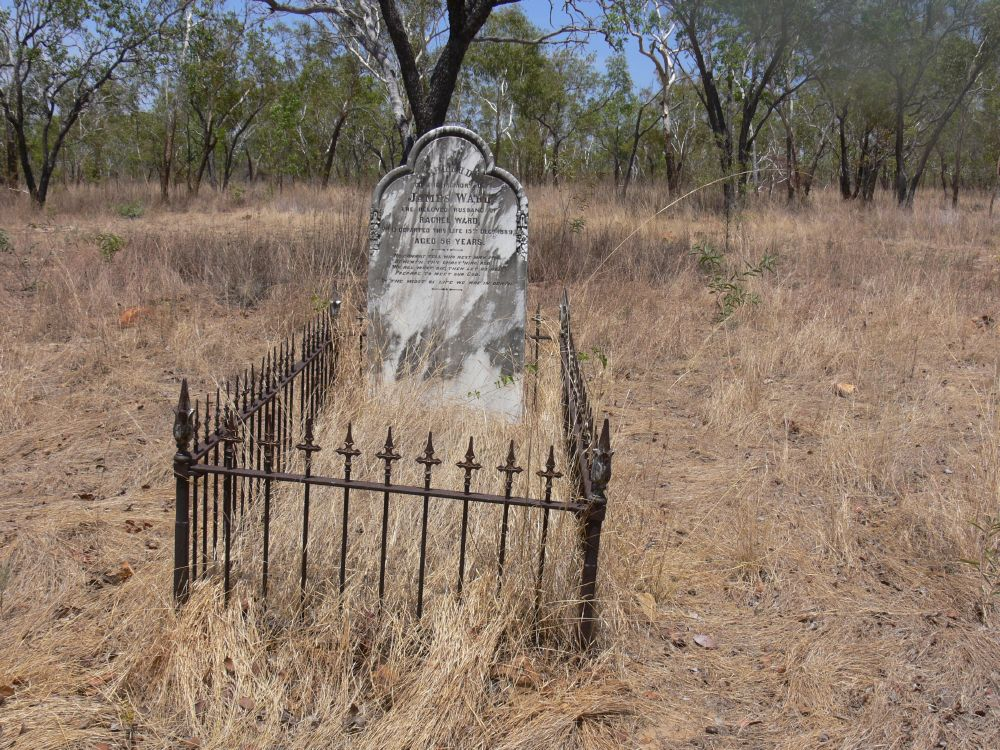
- Old Croydon Cemetery, 2009

- Location within Queensland Location within Australia
- 18.2031°S 142.2352°E
- Location: West of the Croydon railway station, Croydon, Shire of Croydon, Queensland, Australia

History
- Design period: 1870s–1890s (late 19th century)
- Built: c. 1886–1889

Queensland Heritage Register
- Official name: Old Croydon Cemetery, Croydon Cemetery
- Type: state heritage (built)
- Designated: 25 October 2002
- Reference no.: 602374
- Significant period: 1880s (fabric) c. 1886–1889 (historical use)
- Significant components: burial/grave, grave marker, headstone

Old Croydon Cemetery is a heritage-listed closed cemetery west of the Croydon railway station, Croydon, Shire of Croydon, Queensland, Australia. It was built from c. 1886 to 1889. It is also known as Croydon Cemetery. It was added to the Queensland Heritage Register on 25 October 2002.

== History ==
The Old Croydon Cemetery is one of at least 10 cemeteries which served the Croydon area after it was declared a goldfield in 1886. The cemetery was surveyed by John Sircom in 1886 and declared a cemetery reserve on 25 August 1888. It is no longer in use. The Croydon field was the last of the north Queensland gold rushes of the nineteenth century. After a peak in gold production in 1900, mining declined over the next two decades. There was a small revival during the 1930s Depression and again from 1988 to 1991. The present population of the district is approximately 300, and only the main Croydon cemetery is still in use.

Croydon is approximately 110 miles (180 km) west of Georgetown and 90 miles (140 km) south east of the port of Normanton on the Gulf of Carpentaria. This area was first explored by Europeans in the 1860s. John McKinlay searched for lost explorers Burke and Wills in 1862. John Graham MacDonald explored a route from Carpentaria Downs to the Gulf in 1864. H.E. Young investigated routes for an overland telegraph line between Cardwell and Normanton, which was built between 1869 and 1872, and later became a lifeline for the northern mining fields. Pastoralists followed these early explorers, bringing sheep in 1865, but by 1867 many had retreated because of fever, drought, low wool prices and distance from markets.

Gold was first discovered on Croydon Downs Station which had been taken up by W.C. Brown in 1881. In the latter part of 1883, two of his employees James and Walter Alldridge found a leader of quartz carrying gold. However, it was not until 1885 that Richard and Walter Alldridge, acting under instructions from W.C. Brown, prospected the area and discovered twenty payable reefs. The finds were reported in October 1885, and the Croydon area was proclaimed a goldfield on 18 January 1886, thus coming under administration of the Mines Department. W.C. Brown and the Alldridge brothers shared a £1000 reward for the discovery, and the reward claim, Lady Mary, was taken up by 6 partners including W.C. Brown and Richard Alldridge.

By 1887, total population of the district had peaked at 7000, and by 1897 it still had the third highest population in north Queensland after Charters Towers and Townsville. From 1890 to 1910, gold output from the Croydon reefs were second only to Charters Towers. Total production from inception until 1947 was 772,374 ounces (21,896,400 g). By 1909 however, production began to decline and by 1914, the population at the turn of the century had halved. There was a small revival around Tabletop and Golden Gate between 1988 and 1991.

Residents at Croydon goldfields faced many hardships from inadequate supplies of water, pasture grasses and timber for fuel and construction purposes. Isolation was also a major problem until the Croydon to Normanton railway was completed in 1891. The area was subject to droughts and floods, and even a cyclone in 1906. Industrial action in 1888 resulted in the formation of a branch of the Amalgamated Miners' Association, and a strike occurred in 1889 when mining companies again tried to lower wages. Some mines close to Croydon township failed around 1890 when the ore was cut by a wall of granite. However, rich discoveries at Golden Gate to the north west compensated a little for this. A financial setback occurred in the "crash" of 1893, when most banks closed doors and gold buying ceased, throwing many miners out of work.

As on many other Queensland goldfields, Croydon had a Chinese community which developed on the north west fringe of the town. The community constructed a temple, houses and other facilities such as pig ovens. By the end of 1888 Mining Warden L.E.D. Towner reported that Croydon had a population of approximately 3500 of whom 300 were Chinese, Cingalese, Malays and African. It appears that a shifting population of around 300 Asians was maintained. This figure is surprising given that the Queensland Goldfields Amendment Act of 1878 excluded Chinese people from new fields for three years unless they had made the discovery. However, it appears that their involvement at Croydon was primarily as gardeners, carriers and cooks. There was some racial tension at times. A race riot occurred in 1886 when a Chinese residence was pulled down. Also, in May 1888, William Hodgkinson, Minister for Mines, ejected all Chinese from the Croydon and Etheridge goldfields. However, they were soon allowed to return because their market gardens were essential to the well-being of the community.

Despite all difficulties, the 1890s were productive years for Croydon. Pugh's Almanac of 1900 listed 3 banks, 6 blacksmiths, 5 bakers, 6 commission agents, 4 newsagents, 6 carriers, 2 chemists, 6 drapers, 11 sharebrokers, 4 newsagents, 18 hotels and 4 watchmakers, among many other assorted businesses. Croydon became a municipality in 1892 under the control of the Croydon Divisional Board, and in 1907 administration passed to the Croydon Shire Council.

The fields developed with Croydon as the main administrative and commercial centre surrounded by "satellite" communities established at outlying reefs. Members of the outlying communities would visit Croydon on Saturday nights to shop, conduct their business and socialise. There were townships at Golden Gate, Tabletop, Gorge Creek, Golden Valley, Goldstone, Carron, Twelve Mile, and campsites at Homeward Bound, Croydon King, Mark Twain, Lower Twelve Miles, Mulligan's, Flanagan's, Morning Light, Moonstone and Alluvial Springs. This resulted in the establishment of at least 10 cemeteries throughout the district.

Croydon township was first surveyed by John Sircom in 1886 after the district had been proclaimed a goldfield. The Old Croydon cemetery was also surveyed by John Sircom in 1886. It was declared a cemetery reserve on 25 August 1888 and identified as Lot 32 on C8186, Parish of Croydon, County of Surrey. At the time of survey, the cemetery already contained several graves. It apparently continued in use for several years until the main cemetery was surveyed and gazetted. According to the original survey plan, access was from a track extending from Samwell Street and running adjacent to the southern boundary of the reserve. This access is no longer used.

== Description ==
Old Croydon Cemetery, Cemetery Reserve R18, comprises two hectares and is located to the west of the Croydon township.

Current access is via an unnamed, graded track near the eastern boundary. This road was constructed relatively recently for water supply access. It appears to run through the southeast corner of the cemetery reserve. This access is immediately adjacent to an area of about 4500 square metres, less than a quarter of the original surveyed area, which is now broadly considered as the "Old Cemetery". This section is maintained and mowed on an "as required" basis. The area is unfenced.

There are two headstones recording European burials, dated 1888 and 1889, and two markers recording Chinese burials. There are four other discernible graves with no identification.

The terrain is gently sloping with fine-grained sandy soil. Vegetation is predominantly natural with Eucalypts and other endemic trees scattered through the grounds. Tussocky native grasses provide a dense ground cover for much of the year. Native animal and bird life actively use this habitat.

== Heritage listing ==
Old Croydon Cemetery was listed on the Queensland Heritage Register on 25 October 2002 having satisfied the following criteria.

The place is important in demonstrating the evolution or pattern of Queensland's history.

The Old Croydon Cemetery, in use since at least 1886, reflects the early development of the region. The cemetery is an important record of the cultural development of the area, showing the ethnicity, occupations and social status of the inhabitants of early Croydon since settlement.

The place has potential to yield information that will contribute to an understanding of Queensland's history.

The cemetery has the potential to yield information in regards to the early history of the inhabitants of Croydon, their ethnic, social and religious backgrounds and standing within the community.

The place has a strong or special association with a particular community or cultural group for social, cultural or spiritual reasons.

The cemetery is significant for its high spiritual and symbolic value to the community because of the burials that took place there and the evidence of hardship experienced by the first inhabitants of Croydon.
