= Croydon Police Station =

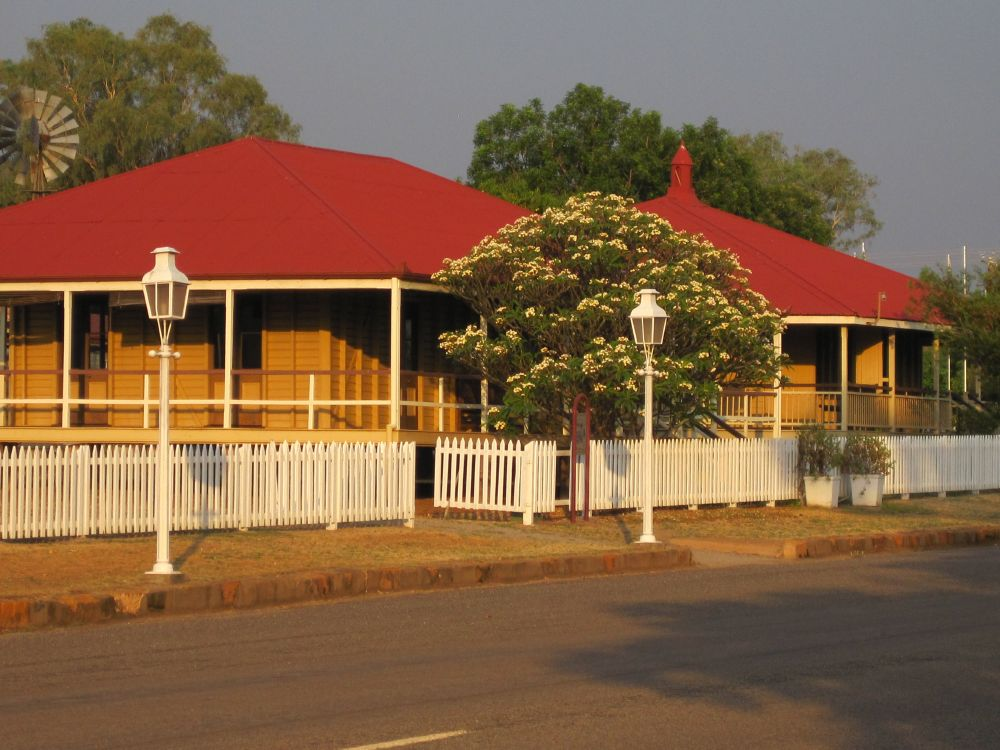
- Croydon Police Station

- Location within Queensland Location within Australia
- 18.2032°S 142.2443°E
- Location: Samwell Street, Croydon, Shire of Croydon, Queensland, Australia

History
- Design period: 1870s–1890s (late 19th century)
- Built: 1899

Site notes
- Architectural style: Classicism

Queensland Heritage Register
- Official name: Police Reserve Complex (former), Former Police Station and Residence
- Type: state heritage (built)
- Designated: 23 July 1999
- Reference no.: 601153
- Significant period: 1890s (historical); 1896–1900s (fabric)

Croydon Police Station is a heritage-listed former police station at Samwell Street, Croydon, Shire of Croydon, Queensland, Australia. It was built in 1899. It is also known as Former Police Station and Residence. It was added to the Queensland Heritage Register on 23 July 1999.

== History ==
European settlement in Croydon commenced following the discovery of gold bearing reefs in the area in about 1885. At first, ore was crushed at the Etheridge field with facilities in Croydon established by the end of 1886 causing a rapid influx of prospectors. A town grew up around the gold field and the initial survey plans included a Police Reserve. The first police station was erected during 1886 for a cost of £196 and a court house incorporating offices for a mining warden and mining registrar was completed in the following year. By 1889 a lock-up, additional cells and stables were added to the Police Reserve.

As Croydon developed, the initial police and justice facilities were replaced with larger buildings. In 1896, local contractor James Lancaster constructed a large timber building for use as police barracks (now known as the former police station). In 1897 further cells were constructed. A residence for the Officer-In-Charge was completed in 1899.

The gold reef discovered at Croydon was exhausted by 1907 and development within the town waned. The police service continued at Croydon and repairs and repainting was undertaken at the police complex in 1911. Further work was conducted in 1937 when the barracks, now too large for the small number of officers serving in Croydon, was cut into sections and only a small section of the original barracks was retained as a police station. The kitchen of the barracks was removed for use as a tracker's quarters. The remainder of the building was sold as timber. Correspondence between the Croydon station and the Inspector of Police in Cairns suggests that the "decline of Croydon" since the initial boom period was the reason for the dismantling and removal of part of the original police barracks. The population of Croydon in 1937 was 250.

In 1939 the verandahs of both the police station and the police residence were made fly proof with the addition of timber battening and fly screens. The trackers quarters were restumped at this time. Although the 1889 lockup was retained in the reduced complex, it was reclad.

In 1938 a police report of the police residence described the building as having three bedrooms, dining and sitting room, kitchen, pantry, bathrooms and verandah.

New police buildings were constructed at the rear of the police reserve in 1977 and the nineteenth century buildings were vacated but not removed from the site. The Minister of Lands gave permission to the National Trust of Queensland to occupy the early buildings in 1982. More recently, the Croydon Shire Council has used the police station as a library and museum.

== Description ==
The former Croydon Police Station is located on the corner of Samwell and Alldridge Streets, Croydon. The site is one of a number of public buildings within the main street of Croydon, and is adjacent to the Court House, and near the Shire Hall.

The site comprises a number of simple timber buildings, including the police residence at the corner of the streets, the police station to the west of this with frontage to Samwell Street and cells to the rear, south of the police station.

The former police station, originally constructed as police barracks and following dismantling of sections of the building reused as the police station from 1937, is a single storeyed timber framed and clad building elevated on low stumps. The hipped roof of the building is clad with corrugated iron sheeting. Verandahs line three sides of the building. The timber verandah posts are stop-chamfered and located between the posts is timber dowel balustrade. A gabled projection on the southern principal facade of the building emphasises the principal entrance.

The police residence is a single storeyed timber-framed building slightly elevated on low stumps. The building comprises a central four room core with kitchen and bathroom to the north. The building is of single skinned construction with the frame expressed externally and internally lined with horizontal boarding. The pyramidal hipped roof is clad with corrugated iron sheeting and extends over a verandah lining the four sides of the principal part of the building. The roof is surmounted by an iron ridge ventilator. Simple timber verandah posts support the verandah and a simple timber dowel balustrade and handrail line the verandahs. Entrance to the building is provided on the southern face via an open tread timber stair. The rear wing abuts the northern edge of the verandah on the northern face of the building and has a small rectangular plan with gabled roof.

The cells located to the rear of the police station are constructed with a timber frame and corrugated iron sheeting cladding externally. The cells are elevated on low stumps. The gabled roof of the small structure is also clad with corrugated iron sheeting. A verandah lines the southern elevation of the building and access is provided via an open tread timber stair.

== Heritage listing ==
The former Croydon Police Station was listed on the Queensland Heritage Register on 23 July 1999 having satisfied the following criteria.

The place is important in demonstrating the evolution or pattern of Queensland's history.

The former Croydon Police Station, established from 1886, demonstrates the evolution of the early Croydon township with the provision of essential services following the discovery of gold in the area.

The place is important in demonstrating the principal characteristics of a particular class of cultural places.

The complex is a good, representative example of a nineteenth century police precinct.

The place is important because of its aesthetic significance.

The buildings have aesthetic significance as an intact precinct of nineteenth century timber civic buildings which contribute to the townscape.
