= Richmond Mine and Battery =

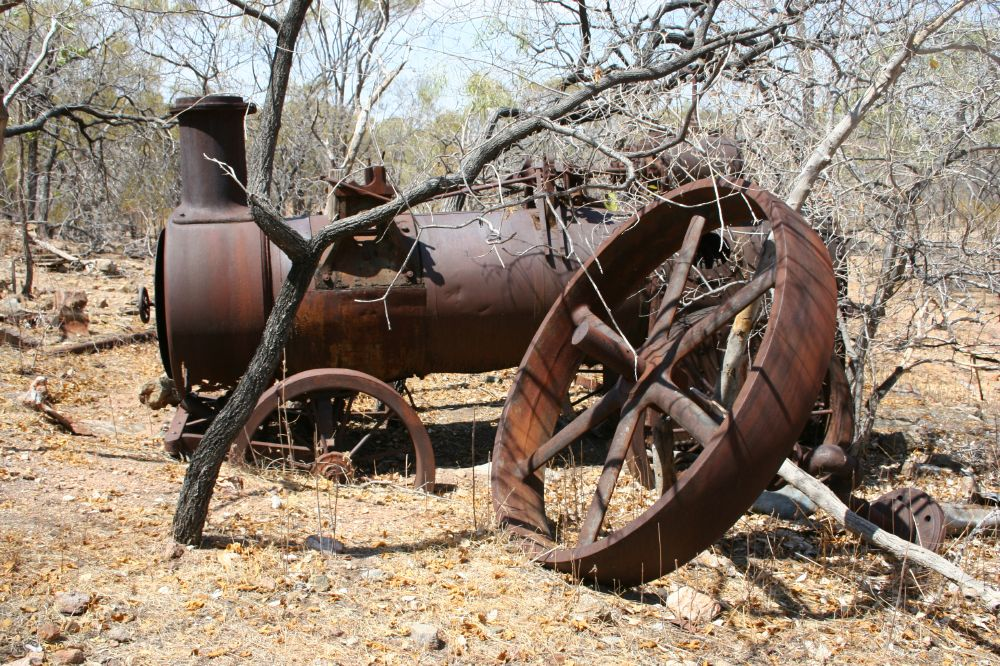
- Richmond mine and battery, 2005

- Location within Queensland Location within Australia
- 18.2476°S 142.3229°E
- Location: Gulf Developmental Road, Croydon, Shire of Croydon, Queensland, Australia

History
- Design period: 1870s–1890s (late 19th century)
- Built: 1886–c. 1916

Queensland Heritage Register
- Official name: Richmond Mine and Battery
- Type: state heritage (built, archaeological)
- Designated: 28 July 2006
- Reference no.: 601857
- Significant period: 1880s–1920s circa (fabric, historical)
- Significant components: shaft, tailings dump, battery/crusher/stamper/jaw breaker, machinery/plant/equipment – mining/mineral processing, incline shaft, mullock heap, kiln, mining camp/settlement site

Richmond Mine and Battery is a heritage-listed mine at Gulf Developmental Road, Croydon, Shire of Croydon, Queensland, Australia. It operated from 1886 to c. 1916. It was added to the Queensland Heritage Register on 28 July 2006.

== History ==
The Richmond Mine, near Croydon, was worked for about three decades, producing gold from 1886 until c. 1916. After 1914 the battery at the Richmond Mine crushed tin ore from mines on the Stanhill tinfield.

Croydon is situated in the heart of the Gulf Savannah, 562 kilometres (349 mi) west of Cairns, approximately 176 kilometres (109 mi) west of Georgetown and 144 kilometres (89 mi) south east of the port of Normanton on the Gulf of Carpentaria. Europeans first explored this area in the 1860s. John McKinlay searched for lost explorers Burke and Wills in 1862 and John Graham MaacDonald explored a route from Carpentaria Downs to the Gulf in 1864. Pastoralists followed these early explorers, bringing sheep in 1865, but by 1867 many had retreated because of fever, drought, low wool prices and distance from the markets. An overland telegraph line was constructed from Cardwell to Normanton between 1869 and 1872. This passed through the Croydon district and later became a lifeline for the northern mining fields.

Gold was first discovered on Croydon Downs Station, which had been taken up by W. Brown in 1881. In the latter part of 1883, two of his employees found quartz carrying gold. However it was not until 1885 that Richard and Walter Alldridge, acting under instructions from WC Brown, prospected the area and discovered 20 payable reefs. The finds were reported in October 1885, and the Croydon area was proclaimed a goldfield on 18 January 1886, thus coming under the administration of the Department of Public Works and Mines.

Hundreds flocked to the area. By 1887 the population of the district had peaked at 7000, and in 1897 it still had the third highest population in north Queensland after Charters Towers and Townsville. From 1890 to 1910, gold output from the Croydon reefs was second only to Charters Towers. Total production from inception until 1947 was 772, 374 ounces. By 1909 however, production began to decline and by 1914, the population at the turn of the century had halved. Inflation during World War I meant that the fixed value of gold could not keep up with increased costs and the field was reduced to a "poor man's field".

Residents on the Croydon Goldfield faced many hardships including inadequate supplies of water; pasture grasses and timber for fuel and construction purposes. Isolation was also a major problem until the Croydon to Normanton railway was completed in 1891. The area was subject to droughts and floods, and even a cyclone in 1906. During the "crash" of 1893, when most banks closed doors and gold buying ceased, many miners were thrown out of work. Despite all these difficulties, the 1890s were productive years for Croydon, as the value of gold increases during a depression. Pugh's Almanac of 1900 listed 3 banks, 6 blacksmiths, 5 bakers, 6 commission agents, 4 newsagents, 6 carriers, 2 chemists, 6 drapers11 share brokers, 18 hotels and 4 watchmakers, among many other assorted businesses. Other townships were established at Golden Gate, Tabletop, Gorge Creek, Golden Valley, Goldstone, Carron, Twelve Miles, Mulligan's, Flannigan's, Morning Light, Moonstone and Alluvial Springs.

The Richmond reef, which outcrops on a hill capped with desert sandstone, strikes nearly north and south and underlies to the east at 35 degrees. Though small (8 to 10 centimetres (3.1 to 3.9 in)) and patchy, it contained extremely rich specimens.

The mine was worked from at least four claims and had underlie shafts at least 118 metres (387 ft) long. Between 1886 and 1907, a total of 6,615 tons of ore returned 21,324 ounces of gold. In the 1890s the Richmond PC was considered one of the best mines on the field. Curiously for a mine owned by syndicates, it was worked mainly by tributers (miners leasing part or all of the mine) in this period. It appears that the mine shut down after 1907 because the winding machinery and vertical boiler needed repairs that the miners could not afford.

Further work carried out between 1912 and 1916 under the name Richmond Amalgamated saw the production of 883 tons of ore yielding 3,696 ounces of gold. This appears to have been the last major production period. The present battery was erected in 1913, with the assistance of a Queensland Government loan under the Mining Machinery Advances Act 1906. The stamps and shed came from the Highland Mary mine in Croydon and the mill engine from the yard of the local foundry, Stuart and McKenzies. The year 1913 is inscribed on the concrete footings. The battery also crushed for the public, including nearby tin mines, for which it installed Wilfley concentrating tables. By 1915 the mine's engine house featured a forge and a portable engine driving the winding engine, which was used to bail water by tank as well as raise ore. The mill shed housed a 5 stamp battery with a self feeder, engine, amalgamating table, berdan pan, two Wilfley tables, and a pump bringing in water from a dam at the rear. The boiler for the pump and engine was large and situated beside the mill shed. The mill in that year gained some notoriety when on 2 November, Albert Chambers was caught up in the drive belt for the Wilfley table and killed.

In 1921 the Richmond battery crushed 58 tons of tin ore from mines on the Stanhill tinfield. It is not known for how long the battery continued to operate.

== Description ==
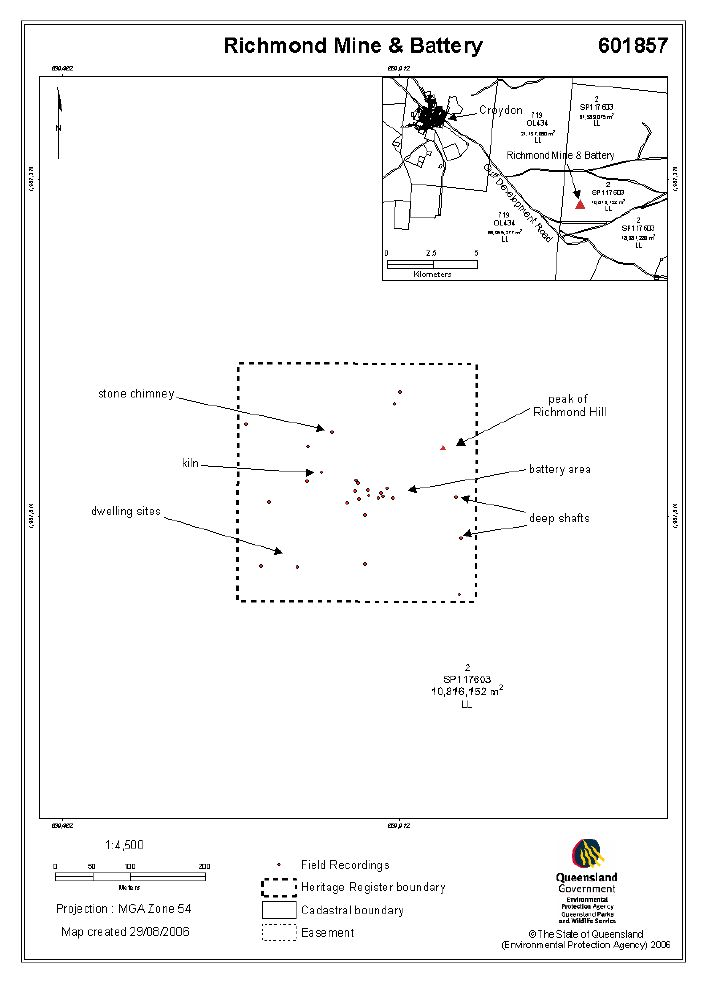
Boundary map, 2006

Richmond Mine and Battery is located 10 kilometres (6.2 mi) east of Croydon and about 1 kilometre (0.62 mi) north of the Gulf Developmental Road. The vegetation in the immediate area is sparse and consists predominantly of eucalypts spp regrowth. Cattle graze the site.

The main workings of the place, including the shafts and incline, mullock, and battery site are situated on the crest and southwest face of Richmond Hill.

The mine and winding plant is situated on an earth bench cut into the hillside at adit level directly above the battery. Extensive areas of dumped rock extend down the hill from the mine. The mine site includes a portable steam engine with a connected cog drive to a small two-drum winding winch that is aligned to a timbered incline shaft. Items of plant in the vicinity include a winch base associated with the portable engine, a baling bucket and a small single-cylinder horizontal engine manufactured by the Stuart & McKenzie foundry of Croydon.

The battery site, situated on two earth benches leading to a flat immediately below the mine, includes the concrete foundations of a five head stamper frame and broken iron legs of the frame. A small inscription on the concrete foundations reads "AOP 18/5/13". A single-cylinder horizontal steam engine is located alongside the battery. A two-cylinder portable engine with all four wheels intact stands below the battery. The engine's flywheel lies alongside.

A tailings dump, dwelling sites, and machinery scatters extend southward from the base of the hill approximately 150 metres (490 ft), on flat ground.

On the flat below the battery site is situated a kiln constructed from a ship's tank and lined with ant bed bricks. An extensive area of cyanided sands is situated to the southwest of the kiln. The presence of the kiln and its position downhill from the battery site and close to the tailings sands indicates it was probably used to melt down the gold precipitate from the cyanide plant to produce gold bullion bars. It is unusual for such a feature to survive on cyanide plants.

The stone fireplace and chimney of a hut is located about 90 metres (300 ft) northwest of the remains of the stamper. Additionally, 100 metres (330 ft) south of the stamper, there is evidence of a row of at least 3 dwelling sites extending westward. These sites typically consist of stone arrangements, glass and artefact scatters, corrugated iron sheeting and remains of corrugated iron tanks.

Surviving plant includes:

- One-cylinder horizontal steam engine – Stuart & McKenzie Makers Croydon
- Two-cylinder portable steam engine – Robey & Co Engineers Lincoln
- Two-drum winding winch – no brand
- One-cylinder horizontal steam engine with flywheel – Clark & Faucet Engineers Queen Street, Brisbane
- Two-cylinder portable steam engine (with 4 wheels) – no brand

== Heritage listing ==
Richmond Mine and Battery was listed on the Queensland Heritage Register on 28 July 2006 having satisfied the following criteria.

The place is important in demonstrating the evolution or pattern of Queensland's history.

The Richmond Mine and Battery is significant in Queensland's history as demonstrating the life cycle of a well preserved small mine in an isolated area. The battery and winding machinery show a pattern typical of small mines with intermittent production and using second hand plant. The four steam engines on site illustrate a range of manufacturers from Croydon (local manufacture), Brisbane and the United Kingdom. It is illustrative particularly of mines with small reefs with rich patches of ore, which were worked consistently on a small scale.

The place demonstrates rare, uncommon or endangered aspects of Queensland's cultural heritage.

The survival of the two-cylinder portable engine with wheels is uncommon in the context of early mining sites. The locally manufactured Stuart & McKenzie engine may be the only extant example of this model. The kiln or oven for melting cyanide residues is rare.

The place has potential to yield information that will contribute to an understanding of Queensland's history.

The remains of the dwelling sites have the potential to provide valuable information contributing to an understanding of Queensland's history. Analysis of the spatial positioning of dwelling sites in relation to the processing plant and workings of the mine, and to each other, would provide new information about life and social hierarchy at isolated mines on north Queensland goldfields in the late 19th and early 20th centuries. Analysis of the physical remains and associated artefacts of the dwellings would aid in our understanding of ethnicity, diet, status, and social class of people living and working on Queensland goldfields.

The place is important in demonstrating the principal characteristics of a particular class of cultural places.

The combination of shafts, extent of mullock, plant, tailings as well as stone fireplace and house site evidence contributes to the significance of the place. The spatial layout of these components, for example the shafts and mullock on the hill (and winding gear for the underlie), the plant and stamper below, and the kiln and tailing sands further below the stamper, demonstrate the typical layout of a small but complete mining and milling site in Queensland.

The place is important because of its aesthetic significance.

The place possesses an aesthetic significance engendered by an evocative quality in the siting of remnant mining objects, machinery and workings within a sparse, arid and isolated environment.
