= Croydon Hospital Ward =

Former hospital in Queensland, Australia

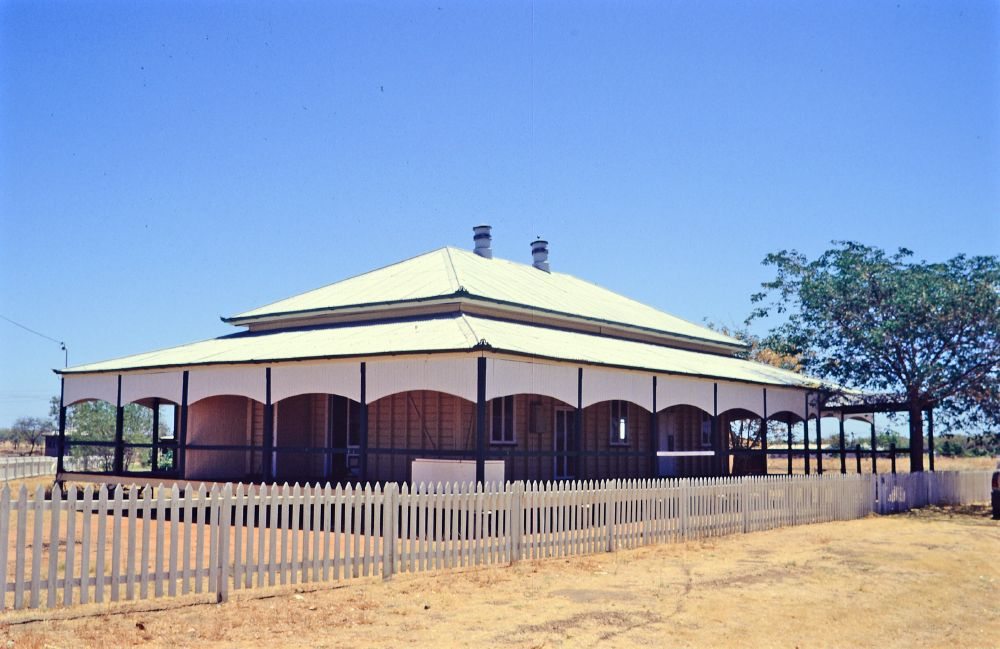
- Croydon Hospital Ward, 1994

- Location within Queensland Location within Australia
- 18.2027°S 142.2424°E
- Location: Sircom Street, Croydon, Shire of Croydon, Queensland, Australia

History
- Design period: 1870s–1890s (late 19th century)
- Built: 1894

Queensland Heritage Register
- Official name: Croydon State Emergency Services Building, Croydon Hospital Ward
- Type: state heritage (built)
- Designated: 21 October 1992
- Reference no.: 600438
- Significant period: 1894 (fabric); 1890s–1980s (historical)
- Significant components: garage, ward – enclosed

Croydon Hospital Ward is a heritage-listed former hospital at Sircom Street, Croydon, Shire of Croydon, Queensland, Australia. It was built in 1894. It is also known as Croydon State Emergency Services Building. It was added to the Queensland Heritage Register on 21 October 1992.

== History ==
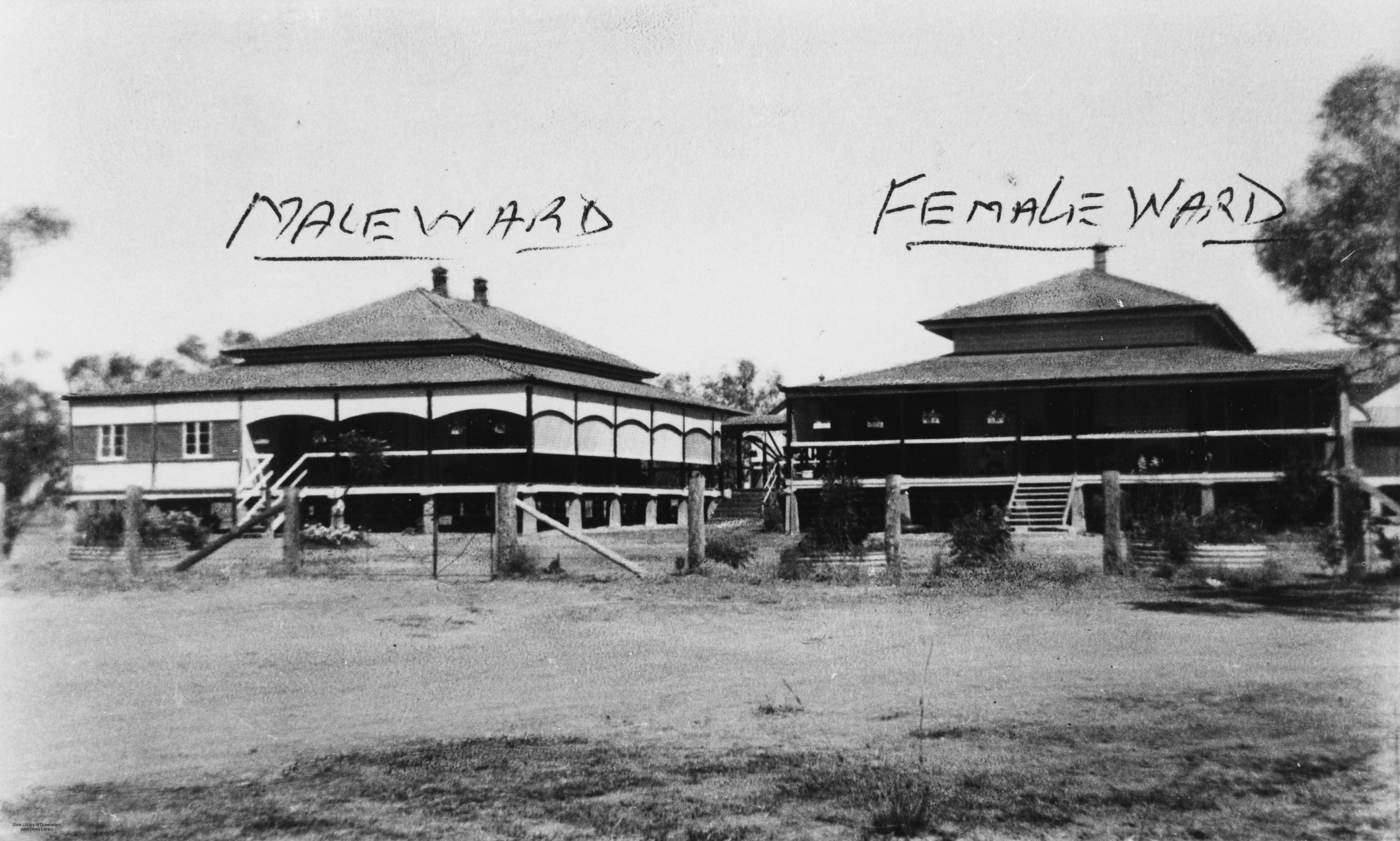
Croydon District Hospital

Croydon Hospital Ward was constructed in 1894, as a ward of the Croydon Hospital.

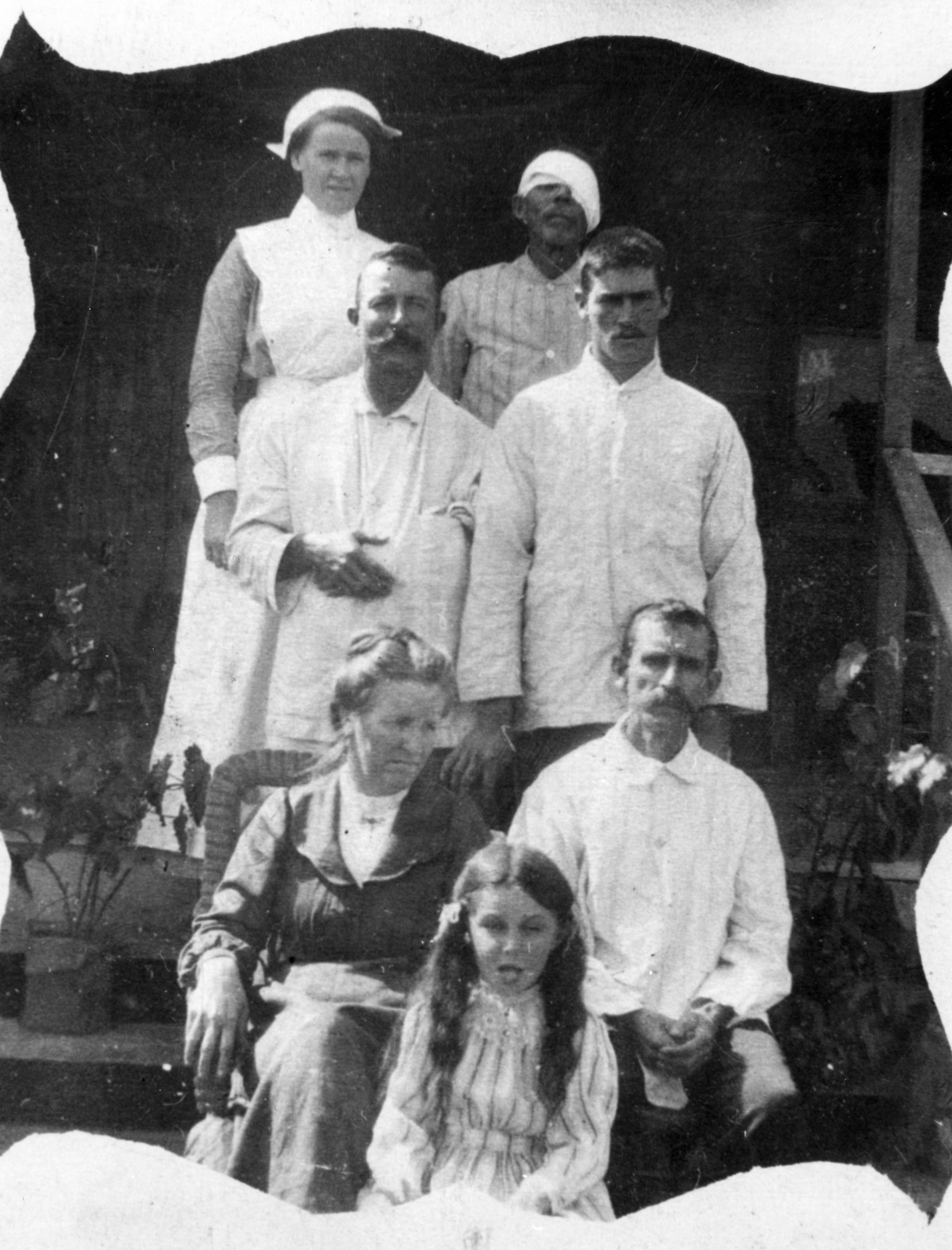
Patients and staff at Croydon District Hospital, circa 1920

In the early 1880s Croydon Downs Station was established on Belmore Creek and evidence of gold was discovered on the property soon after it was established. In October 1885 a major find was reported about 145 kilometres (90 mi) east of Normanton and a rush to the area began. On 18 January 1886 Croydon was proclaimed a goldfield under the administration of the Queensland Mines Department. The town site was then surveyed, and by the end of the year the population of the Croydon field was 2000 and rapidly increasing. The first hospital was constructed in 1886, on the present hospital reserve. This was a primitive structure, of bush timber framing with hessian walls a timber floor and galvanised iron roof. Soon after, a surgery/domestic block and a large ward were erected at a cost of £1886.

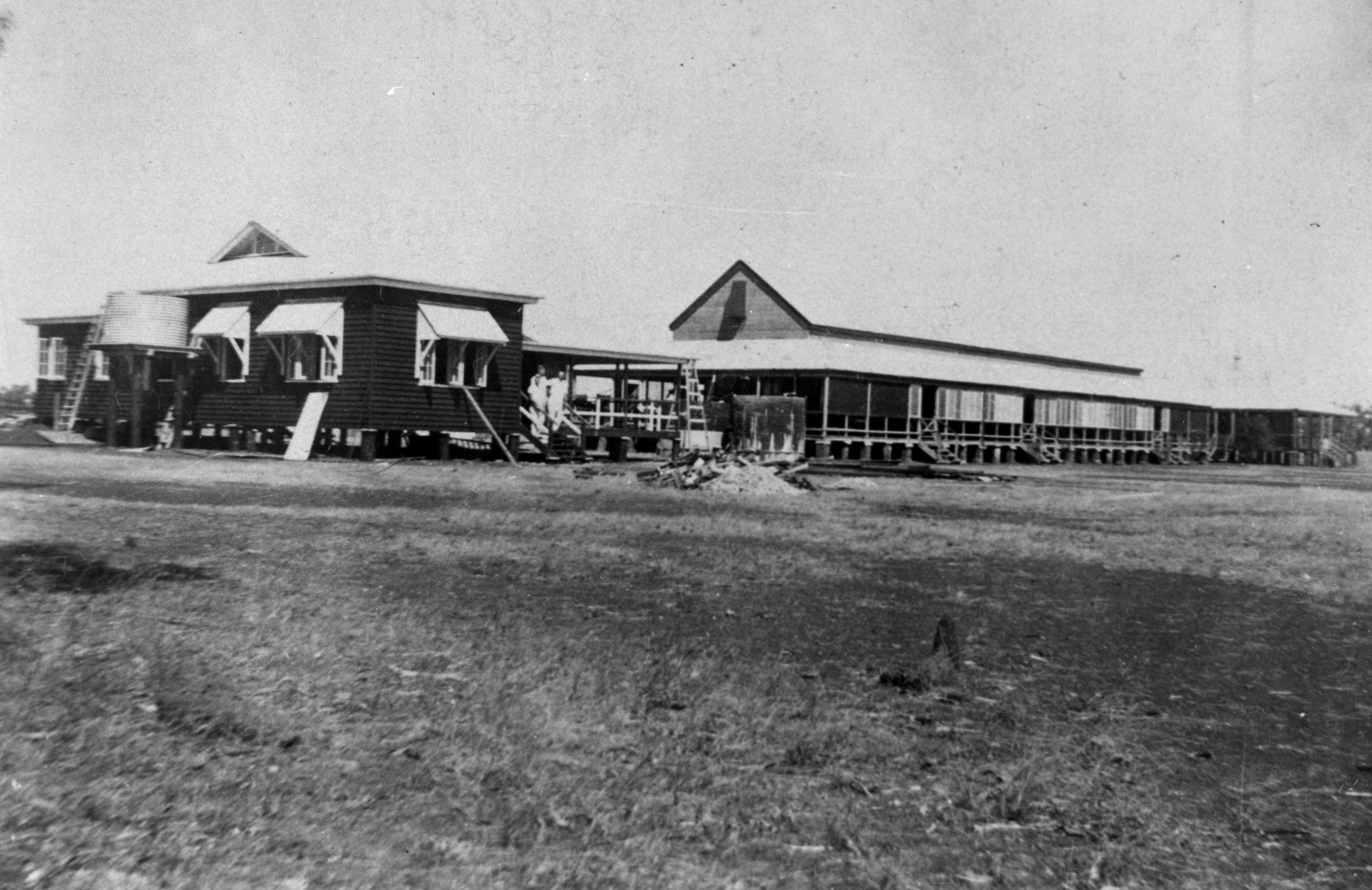
Croydon District Hospital, circa 1930

The district was proclaimed Croydon Division in 1887/88 and declared a municipality in 1892. By 1897 Croydon had the third highest population in North Queensland after that of Townsville and Charters Towers. The establishment of shipping companies trading from southern Queensland to Normanton on the Gulf of Carpentaria and the opening of the railway from Normanton to Croydon assured the development of the gold fields. A peak population of 25,000 demanded a larger hospital facility and in 1894, a second ward building was erected. funded by a major bequest.

The goldfield at Croydon did not sustain its initial success. By the early 1900s its output had fallen considerably and after World War I when widespread mining diminished and the price of gold dropped, it was obvious that the field would not recover. It came to a virtual stop by 1925. The resultant loss in population saw the district redesignated as the Shire of Croydon in 1903–04, with the town becoming the centre of a pastoral district rather than a goldfield. The hospital did not always succeed in staying open and at times the matron had to deputise for a doctor. The last resident doctor was at the hospital in 1934. The Flying Doctor Service visited Croydon from Cloncurry holding a regular monthly clinic from 1953. Emergency dental services were also offered by them.

During the early 1980s, the hospital buildings were considered inadequate for modern hospital use and were threatened with demolition. At that time, the hospital reserve contained two large timber buildings, this ward building and the surgery/residence, and also a small corrugated iron morgue at the rear of the site. This building was then moved from the Hospital Reserve, at the south-western end of Sircom Street on the outskirts of the town, to the corner of Sircom and Brown Streets opposite the Club Hotel.

The building is now the responsibility of the Croydon Shire Council.

== Description ==
The former Croydon Hospital ward building is a single storey timber building on the western corner of Sircom and Brown Streets, Croydon. There is a timber picket fence around the property.

The building is rectangular in plan with an encircling verandah, built in on the north-western side. It is raised on low stumps, those at the perimeter being timber and the remainder, steel. The hipped roof is clad with corrugated iron and has two roof ventilators on the ridge and new ogee gutters and acroteria.

The main entry is a through a porch with a curved corrugated iron roof on the verandah facing Brown Street. There are also stairs at the centre of the rear verandah, and at the southern corner. At the centre of each end is a pair of French doors into the hall.

The verandahs are about 3.7 metres (12 ft) wide, with stop-chamfered posts, arched boarded valance, a handrail but no balustrade between the posts, and are unlined. The external walls have exposed timber framing, lined with 185 chamferboards. The Brown Street side wall has five casement windows, with 3-panes per sash and 2-pane toplights. The height of the sill of these windows alternates from floor level to sill level. Inside the hall, the walls and ceiling are lined with fibro sheet. The ceiling is raked up to the line of the collar tie.

The south-west verandah has been infilled with rooms, clad with external boarding and smaller casements, and internal vertically jointed boards.

At the rear are two sheds. The closest is a corrugated iron garage with two rooms. It has a gabled roof over two rooms with a lean-to roof over the garage. The rooms are clad in corrugated iron, with shutters opening to the outside and the inside. The doors to the rooms are boarded. There is also a recent metal-clad structure behind.

== Heritage listing ==
The former Croydon Hospital Ward was listed on the Queensland Heritage Register on 21 October 1992 having satisfied the following criteria.

The place is important in demonstrating the evolution or pattern of Queensland's history.

The former hospital building is important in illustrating the development of Croydon and district, reflecting the importance of the town and the size of the population when the gold field was at its peak.

The place is important because of its aesthetic significance.

Although relocated, the former hospital building, in its form, scale and materials, relates to the other surviving public buildings of Croydon, including the former town hall, the police station and residence and the Club Hotel, which define the visual character of the township.

The place has a strong or special association with a particular community or cultural group for social, cultural or spiritual reasons.

The former hospital ward building has had a long connection with the people of Croydon and the surrounding district as a focus for the provision of hospital services.
