= Croydon Shire Hall =

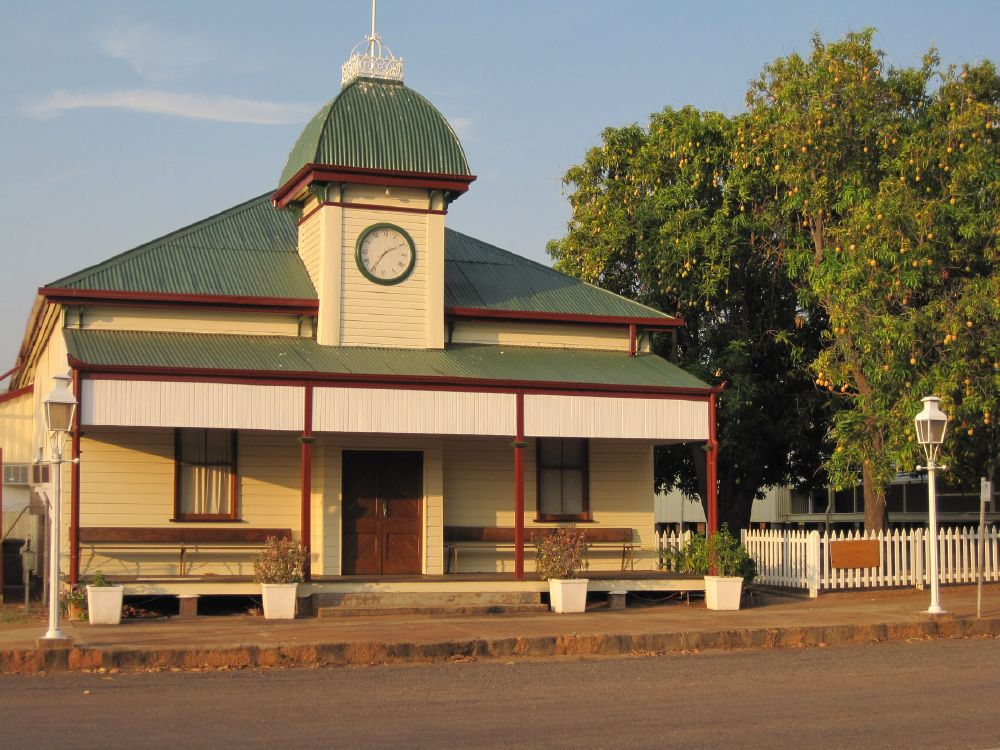
- Croydon Shire Hall, 2011

- Location within Queensland Location within Australia
- 18.2033°S 142.2437°E
- Location: Samwell Street, Croydon, Shire of Croydon, Queensland, Australia

History
- Design period: 1870s–1890s (late 19th century)
- Built: c. 1892

Queensland Heritage Register
- Official name: Croydon Shire Hall, Croydon Shire Office, Croydon Town Hall
- Type: state heritage (landscape, built)
- Designated: 11 June 1996
- Reference no.: 601653
- Significant period: c.1892–1991 (historical); 1890s, 1920s (fabric) c.1892–ongoing (social)
- Significant components: council chamber/meeting room, tower – clock, office/s, hall, trees/plantings, furniture/fittings, views to, projection booth/bio box

Croydon Shire Hall is a heritage-listed town hall at Samwell Street, Croydon, Shire of Croydon, Queensland, Australia. It was built c. 1892. It is also known as Croydon Shire Office and Croydon Town Hall. It was added to the Queensland Heritage Register on 11 June 1996.

== History ==
The Croydon Shire Hall, probably constructed c. 1892, was purpose built as a municipal town hall.

In the early 1880s, Croydon Downs Station was established on Belmore Creek by partners, William Chalmers Browne and James and Walter Aldridge. Evidence of gold was discovered on the property soon after it was established. In 1885, the Aldridge Brothers and Browne located twenty payable lines of gold reef. When the partners reported the discovery in October 1885, a rush to the area began.

On 18 January 1886, Croydon was proclaimed a goldfield under the administration of the Queensland Mines Department. The town of Croydon was surveyed in 1886 and the survey plan shows an earlier building located on the Shire Hall block. Croydon Divisional Board was proclaimed in 1887, and in 1903 this became Croydon Shire Council, under the provisions of the 1902 Local Government Act. The arrival of the railway in 1891 and the discovery of gold in the district meant that by 1897 the area, including the town of Croydon, had the third highest population in North Queensland, after Townsville and Charters Towers. In 1892 a separate Croydon Municipal Council was established to administer the town of Croydon, and this became the Croydon Town Council in 1903. However, with the decline in the price of gold by 1900 and the resultant loss of population, the municipality of Croydon became part of Croydon Shire again in 1908. Mining came to a virtual stop by 1925 and from that time the town became the centre of a pastoral district.

It is likely that the Croydon Shire Hall dates from after the establishment of the municipality in 1892, rather than from the establishment of the divisional board, and photographic evidence reveals that the building was extant by 1897. Local tradition records that the rear of the Shire Hall was extended in 1929 or 1930 when the back "hall like" back portion of Edgerton's Jewellery Shop, Croydon was added to the Shire Hall after the shop front was damaged during a cyclone.

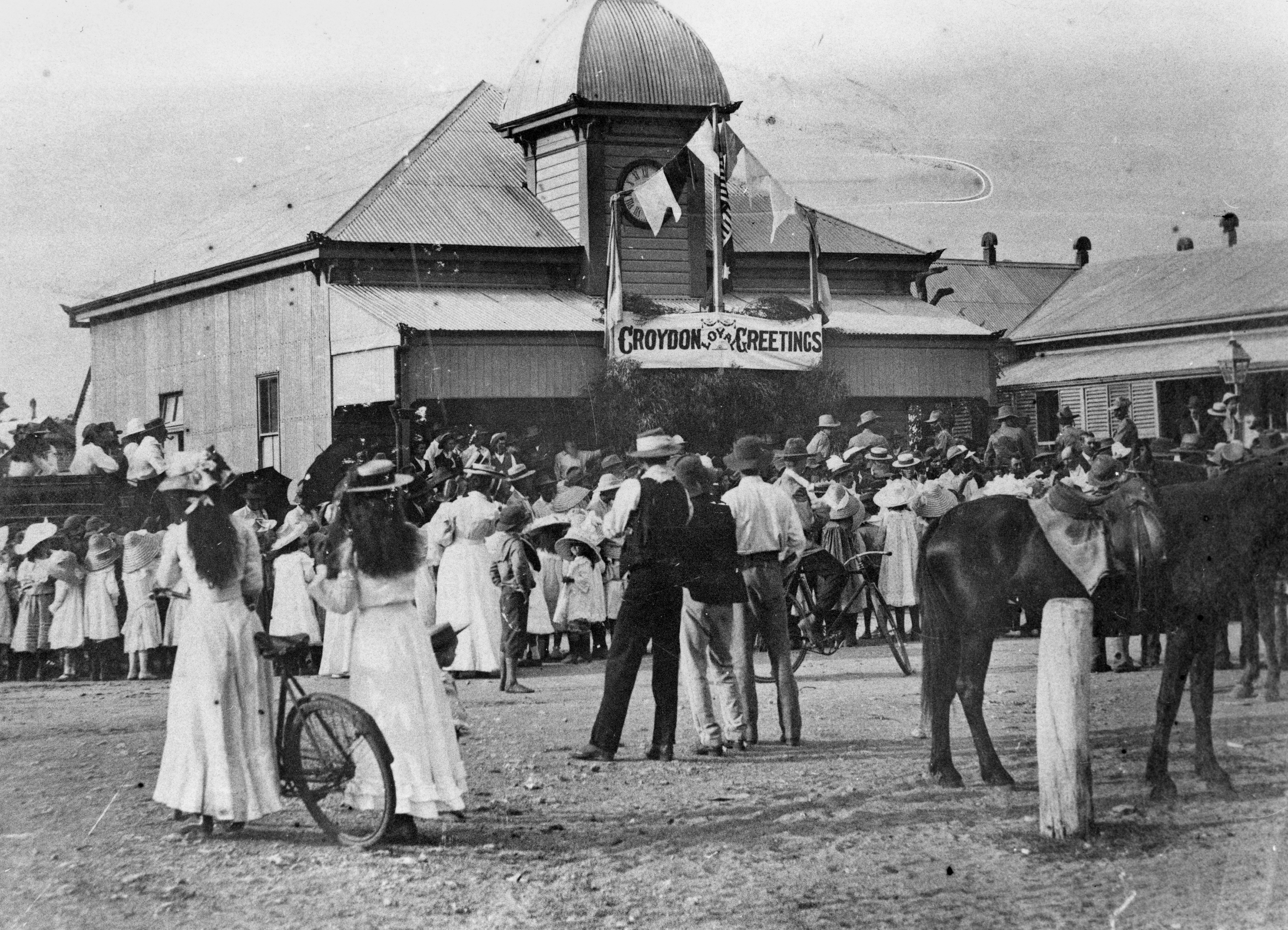
Crowd outside the Town Hall, circa 1900

The hall has been the social centre of the town and district from the early days of settlement. Early photographs indicate that the hall was the location of community celebrations such as Queen Victoria's Jubilee in 1897 and the celebration which took place after the relief of Mafeking during the Boer War in 1900.

In the 1960s the building became the official administration centre for Croydon Shire Council. It remained as the shire offices until 1991, when new offices were constructed across Samwell Street. Since that time the hall has again become a social centre for dances, concerts, hoy and pioneer morning teas. Long-term plans for the building are to turn it into a museum of mining and community history.

== Description ==
The Croydon Shire Hall is a large, single-storeyed timber and galvanised iron building situated in Samwell Street, Croydon. It is one of a group of civic buildings that date to c. 1890.

The hall is rectangular, with a square tower centrally located at the street frontage and a later rectangular addition on the western side. An imposing sense of grandeur is achieved by the bell capped tower with its tall flagpole, clockface and ornate cast iron balustrading.

Although the main body of the hall is of light hardwood construction with corrugated galvanised iron external sheeting, the tower and the front verandah are lined timber, as is the floor and stage at the rear of the interior.

A corrugated galvanised iron sheeted roof is supported on timber trusses and is hipped at the tower end and gabled at the rear; with a separate awning roof over the front verandah.

The ceiling of the hall is unlined, although the later additions are fully lined internally with hardboard sheeting.

The front verandah has been enlarged by removing part of the original wall lining along the east and west sides of the building, infilled with hardboard internally and metal ribbed sheeting externally and provided with a wrap around band of glass louvred windows. The western extension is constructed similarly, though without the narrow metal awning that shades the louvred windows at the front of the building.

At the front entry of the building, doors open either side to the office area within the enclosed verandah and a short passage leads through into the main body of the hall.

Above the passage is a projection booth, with an intact movie projector mounted on an open platform, which is situated directly beneath the tower. Access to the booth is through the office in the eastern verandah.

Externally, the building is shaded by trees to the east and west and has two detached privies at the rear.

Two, apparently early, street lamps are located on the footpath in front of the shire hall. The footpath is finished with early stone pitched gutters.

== Heritage listing ==
Croydon Shire Hall was listed on the Queensland Heritage Register on 11 June 1996 having satisfied the following criteria.

The place is important in demonstrating the evolution or pattern of Queensland's history.

Croydon Shire Hall is significant as one of a group of late 19th-century regional government buildings that illustrate the unprecedented era of prosperity that followed the discovery of gold in the Croydon region. The building also illustrates the establishment of Croydon as a major regional centre during the latter part of the 19th century.

The building demonstrates a continuous association of local government administration with this site for over a century.

The place is important in demonstrating the principal characteristics of a particular class of cultural places.

In its relatively unchanged state the hall demonstrates the principal characteristics of a regional shire hall in North West Queensland.

The place is important because of its aesthetic significance.

The Croydon Shire Hall, through its distinctive design and its location in a street of late 19th-century timber government buildings, is an aesthetically pleasing building valued by the Croydon community.

The place has a strong or special association with a particular community or cultural group for social, cultural or spiritual reasons.

In its role as a shire hall the building has been a focal point for civic and social events since its construction.
