= Tabletop Cemetery =

Heritage cemetery in Australia

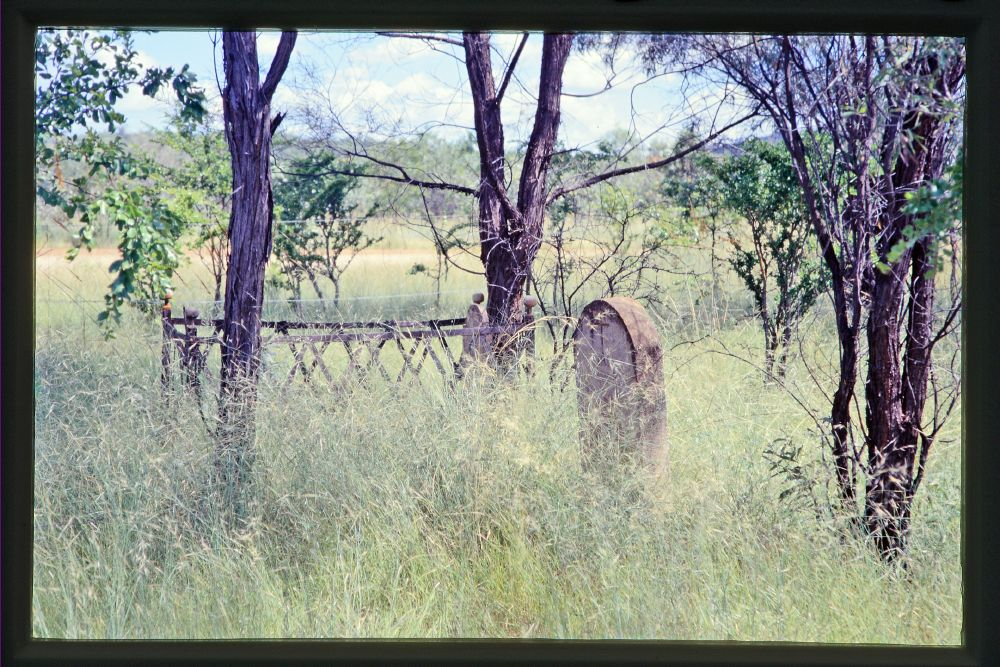
- Tabletop Cemetery, 2000

- Location within Queensland Location within Australia
- 18.0844°S 142.3045°E
- Location: 15km NE of Croydon, Queensland, Australia

History
- Design period: 1870s–1890s (late 19th century)
- Built: c. 1887–1910s

Queensland Heritage Register
- Official name: Tabletop Cemetery
- Type: state heritage (built)
- Designated: 13 April 2006
- Reference no.: 602371
- Significant period: c. 1887–1910s (fabric, and historical period of use)
- Significant components: grave marker, fence/wall – perimeter, headstone, burial/grave, grave surrounds/railings

Tabletop Cemetery is a heritage-listed cemetery is 15 kilometres (9.3 mi) northeast of Croydon, Queensland, Australia. It was built from c. 1887 to 1910s. It was added to the Queensland Heritage Register on 13 April 2006.

== History ==
Tabletop Cemetery is one of six cemeteries that served the Croydon district after it was declared a goldfield in 1886. The cemetery is situated near the former township of Tabletop, approximately 19 kilometres (12 mi) northeast of Croydon. The cemetery covers an area of approximately 1260 square metres, but was never gazetted as a cemetery reserve. Twenty-three potential burials have been identified in the cemetery, and at least one of the graves may be Chinese.

The Croydon field was one of the last of the north Queensland gold rushes of the nineteenth century. After a peak in gold production in 1900, mining declined over the next two decades. There was a small revival during the 1930s depression and again from 1988 to 1991. The present population of the district is approximately 300.

Croydon is situated in the heart of the Gulf Savannah, 562 kilometres (349 mi) west of Cairns, approximately 176 kilometres (109 mi) west of Georgetown and 144 kilometres (89 mi) south east of the port of Normanton on the Gulf of Carpentaria. Europeans first explored this area in the 1860s. John McKinlay searched for lost explorers Burke and Wills in 1862 and John Graham MacDonald explored a route from Carpentaria Downs to the Gulf in 1864. Pastoralists followed these early explorers, bringing sheep in 1865, but by 1867 many had retreated because of fever, drought, low wool prices and distance from the markets. An overland telegraph line was constructed from Cardwell to Normanton between 1869 and 1872. This passed through the Croydon district and later became a lifeline for the northern mining fields.

Gold was first discovered on Croydon Downs Station, which had been taken up by W. Brown in 1881. In the latter part of 1883, two of his employees found quartz carrying gold. However it was not until 1885 that Richard and Walter Alldridge, acting under instructions from WC Brown, prospected the area and discovered 20 payable reefs. The finds were reported in October 1885, and the Croydon area was proclaimed a goldfield on 18 January 1886, thus coming under the administration of the Queensland Department of Public Works and Mines.

Hundreds flocked to the area. By 1887 the population of the district had peaked at 7000, and by 1897 it still had the third highest population in north Queensland after Charters Towers and Townsville. From 1890 to 1910, gold output from the Croydon reefs were second only to Charters Towers. Total production from inception until 1947 was 772, 374 ounces. By 1909 however, production began to decline and by 1914, the population at the turn of the century had halved.

Residents on the Croydon Goldfield faced many hardships including inadequate supplies of water; pasture grasses and timber for fuel and constructions purposes. Isolation was also a major problem until the Croydon to Normanton railway was completed in 1891. The area was subject to droughts and floods, and even a cyclone in 1906. During the "crash" of 1893, when most banks closed doors and gold buying ceased, many miners were thrown out of work. Despite all these difficulties, the 1890s were productive years for Croydon. Pugh's Almanac of 1900 listed 3 banks, 6 blacksmiths, 5 bakers, 6 commission agents, 4 newsagents, 6 carriers, 2 chemists, 6 drapers11 share brokers, 18 hotels and 4 watchmakers, among many other assorted businesses.

Other mining townships were established at Golden Gate, Tabletop, Gorge Creek, Golden Valley, Goldstone, Carron, Twelve Miles, Mulligan's, Flannigan's, Morning Light, Moonstone and Alluvial Springs, with Croydon acting as the main administrative and commercial centre. Members of the outlying communities would visit Croydon on Saturday nights to shop, conduct their business and socialise.

As on many other Queensland goldfields, a Chinese community was formed at Croydon, congregating on the north west fringe of the town. At the end of 1888 Mining Warden Towner reported that Croydon had a population of 3500 of whom 300 were Chinese, Cingalese, Malay or African. This figure is surprising given that the Queensland Goldfields Amendment Act of 1878 excluded Chinese people from new fields for three years unless they had made the discovery. However it appears that the level of Chinese involvement at Croydon was confined to the service industry and in occupations such as gardeners, carriers, bakers and cooks. Racial tension was high at times and is reflected in a race riot in 1886 and later by the formation of the Anti-Chinese League in early 1888.

In Tabletop the town baker, Jim Sing conducted business for over eight years until 1900. It is significant that, in a region that experienced racial discord, a person of likely Chinese heritage is buried amidst Europeans in the Tabletop cemetery.

Tabletop township, located approximately 19 kilometres (12 mi) north-east from Croydon, was surveyed in 1887. Along with Croydon it was among the first areas on the Croydon Goldfield to be developed. A daily horse-drawn coach service between Tabletop and Croydon was soon established.

Mines serviced by Tabletop township included the Federation, Day Dawn, Mount Morgan, Bobby Dazzler, Happy Jack, Rising Sun, Ace of Hearts, Star of Hope, Black Diamond, Blackbird and Lady Jane. Two large mills operated during its peak years, the 5-head Day Dawn on the southern side of town, and the 12-head Catherine on the northern side.

In 1888 a small provisional school opened at Tabletop. This was the first provincial school on the goldfield, with Croydon provisional school opening one year later. By 1889, 20 children attended the Tabletop school and numbers evened out at 22 until the late 1890s, indicating a stable family community. As with many gold towns, almost overnight Tabletop emerged as small service town, with 8 hotels, a post office, 5 stores, 2 blacksmiths, 2 billiard saloons, a chemist, 2 produce dealers and a police presence. This supported a population of approximately 500 miners, their families and supporting industries, all initially enthusiastic about mining prospects in the district. However, the community quickly declined to around 220 and declined further after the mid-1890s. While the post office operated from 1887 to 1911, businesses in the town began to close from as early as 1893, a trend which continued through to 1900. By 1920, only the Tabletop Hotel remained.

The Tabletop community interacted socially with the nearby smaller townships of Golden Valley and Carron. Race meetings in particular were popular and Tabletop combined with Golden Valley in 1889 to form the Tabletop and Golden Valley Racing Club. The community was spiritually supported by both Church of England and Roman Catholic clergy based in Croydon as well as by the Primitive Methodist clergy based at nearby Golden Valley. A Senior Sergeant and Constable maintained law and order and their presence in town is represented in the Tabletop cemetery.

In 1893 Henry Hasenkamp was posted to Tabletop as the Senior Constable, Clerk of Petty Sessions and Inspector of Slaughterhouses. He was accompanied by his wife Mary and family. Not long after they arrived their ten-year-old son, Henry Adolphous died on 19 October 1893, about 3 weeks short of his eleventh birthday. He was buried in the Tabletop cemetery. The next year Henry and Mary erected a simple headstone and encircled the gravesite with an iron railing. The grave mound was lovingly decorated with small clamshells and a few larger "Bailer" shells.

Families associated with mining communities often led a migratory lifestyle and many suffered the loss of a child due to the primitive living conditions and lack of medical supplies and expertise. Consequently, individual child burials (i.e. not within a family plot) are common in remote burial grounds – poignant reminders of the harshness of frontier living and the temporary nature of many early mining towns.

== Description ==
Tabletop Cemetery is situated on the corner of two formed station roads which provide access to the site. The terrain is slightly undulating and consists of finely grained sandy soil. Eucalypts and other native trees are scattered throughout the area and tussocky grasses provide a dense ground cover during much of the year. Although the cemetery lies within an area heavily grazed by cattle, its perimeter fence protects the site. Native birds and animals also utilize this area.

Of the 23 potential burial sites identified within the cemetery, only five have headstones and only three are enclosed with iron railings. The three graves that have iron enclosures have been re-painted white in recent times. Identified graves date from between 1889 and 1904.

Stone piles, mounds, or shallow depressions are representative of the possible burials within the cemetery. While it has not been properly determined whether these are actual burial sites, no similar features (i.e. stone piles, mounds) were seen to occur naturally outside the confines of the cemetery.

The identifiable headstones within the fenced cemetery all face to the east, and all the individual graves (including the stone piles and mounds) are aligned in an east–west direction.

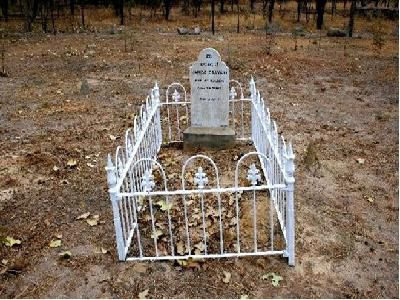
Grave of James Crameri died 14 November 1904

Grave 1. James Crameri, died 14 November 1904. This grave has a marble headstone with inscription and is surrounded by an iron railing, painted white in recent times.

Grave 2. Henry Aldolphous Hasenkamp, died 19 October 1893 (child, aged just under 11 years). Similar to the Grave 1, Grave 2 has a marble headstone with inscription and is surrounded by an iron railing painted white. In addition, this grave is marked by a scattering of clam and other sea shells.

Grave 3. A grave enclosed with an iron railing. This grave is marked by strap diagonal framing on its railings and has a sandstone headstone which is now illegible. Four stone mounts are visible, one for each railing corner post, and the marks on these suggest that at some stage this grave may have been slightly repositioned. A tree has grown up through the strap diagonal framing at the headstone end of the grave.

Grave 4. Catherine Lahy, died 10 June 1889 (child, aged 2 years). The grave is identified by a solid sandstone headstone rounded at its top and inscribed with a cross, and an earth mound.

Grave 5. Robert Fitzmaurice, died 29 April 1889 (child, aged 4 years 8 months). The grave can be identified by a simple stone headstone. Included on its inscription is a large cross.

Grave 6. This grave consists of a solid rectangular stone headstone in the style of a Chinese grave marker, and similar in form to Chinese graves which are evident in the Croydon town cemetery. However, there is no visible inscription on this headstone and so the ethnicity of this grave cannot be confirmed.

== Heritage listing ==
Tabletop Cemetery was listed on the Queensland Heritage Register on 13 April 2006 having satisfied the following criteria.

The place is important in demonstrating the evolution or pattern of Queensland's history.

Dating from c. 1887, Tabletop Cemetery demonstrates and contributes to our understanding of the pattern and nature of settlement in small frontier mining towns. Established prior to any officially surveyed cemetery, this small burial ground served the township of Tabletop from the mid-1880s until the township declined in the 1910s. The cemetery is an important record of the historical development of the area and demonstrates in the surviving identified graves (including the graves of two children and a Chinese person) the ethnicity, occupations and social status of the inhabitants of a small satellite township on the Croydon goldfield. The place is important in demonstrating the nature of life on the Croydon goldfields in the late 19th and early 20th centuries, particularly the high infant and child mortality experienced in early mining settlements.

The place has potential to yield information that will contribute to an understanding of Queensland's history.

Tabletop Cemetery is one of a group of 6 cemeteries located on the former Croydon goldfield, and is still legible as an early burial ground. 23 potential burial sites have been identified, with remnant surviving fabric including 6 graves with headstones or grave markers, one of which is in the style of a Chinese grave marker. At least three of the graves have iron-railing surrounds. The place has the potential to yield information about the early history of the inhabitants of the field; in particular, a clearer understanding of ethnic, social, and religious background and attitudes within the mining community, through further investigation of the placement, inscriptions, type of materials used, or information relating to the deceased such as age or religion.

The place has a strong or special association with a particular community or cultural group for social, cultural or spiritual reasons.

Tabletop Cemetery has social significance for its symbolic value to the Croydon community.
