= Waterfall Creek =

Waterfall Creek may refer to:

== Creeks or streams ==
=== Australia ===
- Waterfall Creek in Royal National Park, New South Wales
- Waterfall Creek, tributary of Kowmung River, New South Wales
- Waterfall Creek, tributary of Fish River (Oberon), New South Wales
- Waterfall Creek in Waterfall Reserve of Mount Wilson, New South Wales
- Waterfall Creek, site of Gunlom Falls, Northern Territory
- Waterfall Creek in Hallett Cove Conservation Park, South Australia
- Waterfall Creek in Western River Wilderness Protection Area, South Australia
- Waterfall Creek, tributary of Bundara River, Victoria, Australia
- Several creeks in Western Australia, see List of watercourses in Western Australia, W–Z

=== United States ===
- Waterfall Creek in Keystone Canyon, Alaska, US
- Waterfall Creek, site of Douglas Falls, North Carolina, US

== Other uses ==
- Site of a settlement for the Homeward Bound Battery and Dam, Queensland, Australia
- Waterfall Creek, homestead in the locality of Gilla, Queensland, Australia
