= Croydon, Queensland =

Croydon
- Town
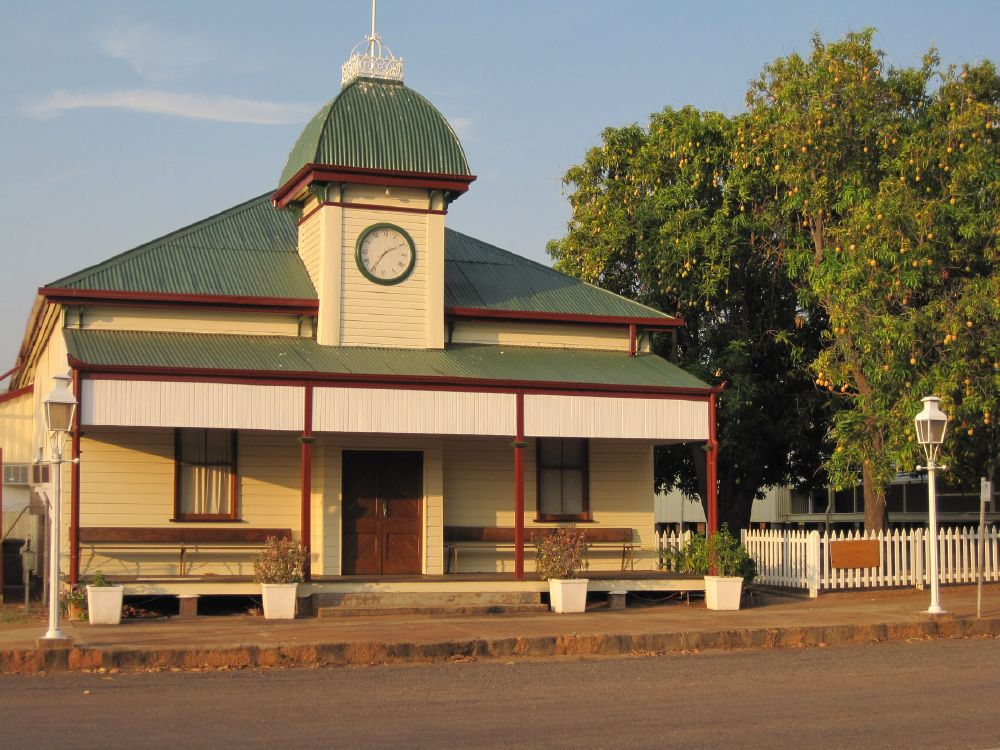
- Croydon Shire Hall, 2011

- Interactive map of Croydon
- Coordinates: 18.2056°S 142.2447°E
- Country: Australia
- State: Queensland
- LGA: Shire of Croydon
- Location: 147 km (91 mi) W of Georgetown; 156 km (97 mi) SE of Normanton; 529 km (329 mi) W of Cairns; 1,896 km (1,178 mi) NW of Brisbane

Government
  - State electorate: Traeger
  - Federal division: Kennedy

Area
  - Total: 4,620.0 km^{2} (1,783.8 sq mi)
- Elevation: 116 m (381 ft)

Population
  - Total: 215 (2021 census)
  - Density: 0.04654/km^{2} (0.12053/sq mi)
- Postcode: 4871
- Mean max temp: 33.9 °C (93.0 °F)
- Mean min temp: 20.4 °C (68.7 °F)
- Annual rainfall: 731.6 mm (28.80 in)
Localities around Croydon
| Karron | Howitt | Strathmore |
| Blackbull | Croydon | Gilbert River |
| Coralie | Claraville | Esmeralda |

Croydon is an outback town and locality within the Shire of Croydon in Queensland, Australia. It is a terminus for the Normanton to Croydon railway line, which operates the Gulflander tourist train. In the 2021 census, the locality of Croydon had a population of 215 people.

== Geography ==
National Highway 1 runs through from east to west.

The Richmond–Croydon Road runs along part of the eastern boundary.

== Climate ==
Croydon has a hot semi-arid climate (Köppen: BSh), with a short wet season from December to March, and a long dry season from April to November. Although average daily maxima remain high year-round- exceeding 29.2 °C (84.6 °F) in all months; average minima have greater variation: from 14.1 °C (57.4 °F) in July to 24.6 °C (76.3 °F) in December. Average annual rainfall is 752.7 mm (29.63 in), and the highest daily rainfall recorded was 381.0 millimetres (15.00 in) on 29 January 1908. The town is extremely sunny, averaging 201.9 clear days and only 48.6 cloudy days annually. Extreme temperatures have ranged from 2.6 °C (36.7 °F) on 10 July 1983 to 43.9 °C (111.0 °F) on 7 November 1965.

Climate data for Croydon (18º12'00"S, 142º14'24"E, 116 m AMSL) (1889-2024 normals, extremes 1962-2014)
| Month | Jan | Feb | Mar | Apr | May | Jun | Jul | Aug | Sep | Oct | Nov | Dec | Year |
|---|---|---|---|---|---|---|---|---|---|---|---|---|---|
| Record high °C (°F) | 42.8 (109.0) | 41.2 (106.2) | 39.7 (103.5) | 38.0 (100.4) | 36.8 (98.2) | 35.2 (95.4) | 35.4 (95.7) | 37.2 (99.0) | 39.4 (102.9) | 42.2 (108.0) | 43.9 (111.0) | 43.3 (109.9) | 43.9 (111.0) |
| Mean daily maximum °C (°F) | 35.5 (95.9) | 34.5 (94.1) | 34.3 (93.7) | 33.9 (93.0) | 31.6 (88.9) | 29.2 (84.6) | 29.2 (84.6) | 31.2 (88.2) | 34.3 (93.7) | 36.9 (98.4) | 38.0 (100.4) | 37.3 (99.1) | 33.8 (92.9) |
| Mean daily minimum °C (°F) | 24.2 (75.6) | 23.9 (75.0) | 23.3 (73.9) | 21.0 (69.8) | 17.9 (64.2) | 14.7 (58.5) | 14.1 (57.4) | 15.7 (60.3) | 19.2 (66.6) | 22.5 (72.5) | 24.4 (75.9) | 24.6 (76.3) | 20.5 (68.8) |
| Record low °C (°F) | 17.0 (62.6) | 17.2 (63.0) | 13.9 (57.0) | 11.5 (52.7) | 6.0 (42.8) | 3.9 (39.0) | 2.6 (36.7) | 5.2 (41.4) | 7.0 (44.6) | 11.1 (52.0) | 16.7 (62.1) | 15.0 (59.0) | 2.6 (36.7) |
| Average precipitation mm (inches) | 223.4 (8.80) | 180.2 (7.09) | 118.6 (4.67) | 24.4 (0.96) | 8.9 (0.35) | 7.8 (0.31) | 4.2 (0.17) | 2.5 (0.10) | 5.3 (0.21) | 14.2 (0.56) | 45.2 (1.78) | 112.4 (4.43) | 752.7 (29.63) |
| Average precipitation days (≥ 1.0 mm) | 12.0 | 11.3 | 7.3 | 1.7 | 0.9 | 0.7 | 0.5 | 0.3 | 0.5 | 1.4 | 3.9 | 7.3 | 47.8 |
| Average afternoon relative humidity (%) | 50 | 54 | 47 | 36 | 34 | 32 | 29 | 25 | 23 | 25 | 30 | 37 | 35 |
| Average dew point °C (°F) | 21.1 (70.0) | 22.2 (72.0) | 19.8 (67.6) | 15.8 (60.4) | 12.6 (54.7) | 9.6 (49.3) | 7.7 (45.9) | 7.7 (45.9) | 9.0 (48.2) | 12.3 (54.1) | 14.9 (58.8) | 18.3 (64.9) | 14.2 (57.6) |
Source: Bureau of Meteorology (1889-2024 normals, extremes 1962-2014)

== History ==
The historic goldrush town of Croydon is located in the heart of the Gulf Savannah, 529 kilometres (329 mi) west of Cairns. Mining in the area quickly drove out the Tagalaka people indigenous to the area. Croydon was a large pastoral holding owned by Alexander Brown and Margaret Chalmers that covered an area of approximately 5,000 square kilometres (2,000 sq mi), when first settled in the 1880s. The town's name is derived from a pastoral run name, that was used by their sons, Alexander Brown and William Chalmers Brown, pastoralists; William Chalmers Brown was born in Croydon, England in 1841 and is buried at Toowong cemetery in Brisbane. Gold was discovered in 1885 and by 1887, the town's population had reached 7,000. Croydon Post Office opened on 20 March 1886.

Croydon State School was established on 12 September 1889 but did not open until 7 July 1890.

Gold was to be the main economic production of the area for four decades. The Mining Warden left in 1926 as there were too few miners left on the field. During its heyday, Croydon was the fourth largest town in the colony of Queensland.

Chinese settlers moved into the Croydon area soon after the gold discovery was reported in 1885. From the earliest days of settlement they played a significant role in the viability of the isolated field by supplying fresh vegetables and fruit. They also supported the work of the miners as cooks, carriers and by working on tribute. The Chinese settlement at Croydon developed on the north west fringe of the town. This was a similar pattern to other mining towns in north Queensland. The community constructed a temple, houses and associated facilities such as pig ovens, with the temple as the central focus of the settlement.

In 1917, Dr. Elkington, Director of the Division of Tropical Hygiene, Commonwealth Department of Health, was concerned about health and hygiene of its growing population, contemplated conducting a statistical and social survey of the town, which did not eventuate. Elkington's interest in sociological surveys of gathering social and economic details on a population later developed into the 1924 Sociological Survey of White Women conducted from the Institute of Tropical Medicine in Townsville.

Currently, Croydon has a much smaller population, having greatly decreased following the end of the gold rush. The population is now a few hundred people. The town is one of the termini for the Gulflander railway, opened for the gold rush in 1891 but now a tourist railway operated by Traveltrain. In early 2009, the close proximity of a receding cyclone ex-Cyclone Charlotte, caused torrential rain and Croydon to be flooded. An estimated $5 million of damage was made to town infrastructure.

== Demographics ==
In the 2011 census, the locality of Croydon and surrounding areas had a population of 312 people.

In the 2016 census, the locality of Croydon had a population of 258 people.

In the 2021 census, the locality of Croydon had a population of 215 people.

== Heritage listings ==
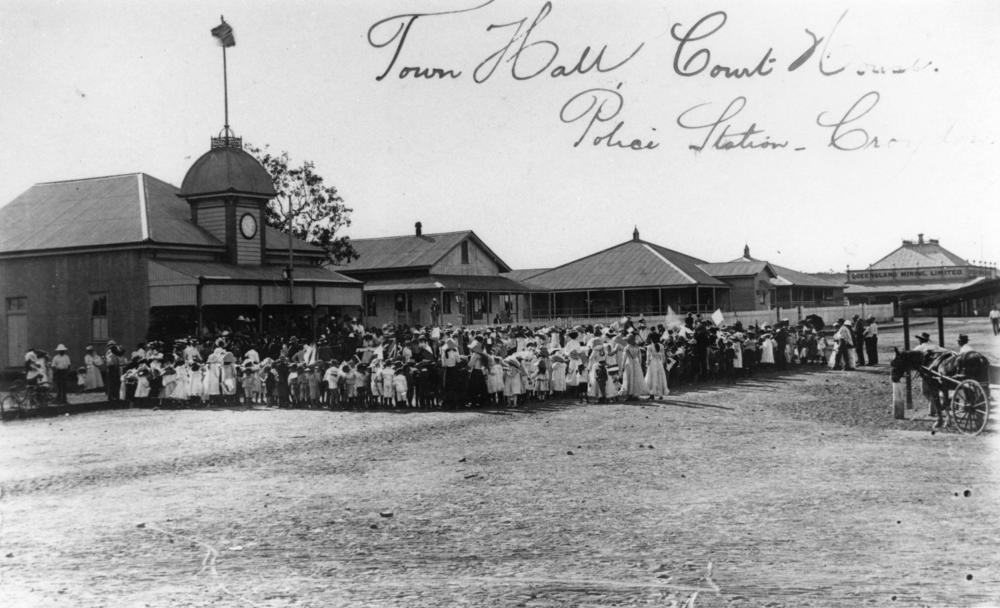
The heritage listed Croydon Town Hall, built in 1892

Croydon has a number of heritage-listed sites, including:

- Homeward Bound Battery and Dam, Croydon
- Content Mine, Gulf Developmental Road
- Richmond Mine and Battery, Gulf Developmental Road
- Croydon railway station, Helen Street
- Croydon Cemetery, Julia Creek Road
- Golden Gate Mining and Town Complex, Normanton (Gulf Developmental) Road
- Station Creek Cemetery, Normanton Road
- Normanton to Croydon railway line, Normanton to Croydon
- Chinese Temple and Settlement Site, off Gulf Developmental Road
- Court House, Samwell Street
- Croydon Shire Hall (formerly Croydon Town Hall), Samwell Street
- Police Station, Samwell Street
- Croydon Hospital Ward, Sircom Street
- Tabletop Cemetery
- Old Croydon Cemetery, west of the railway station

== Education ==
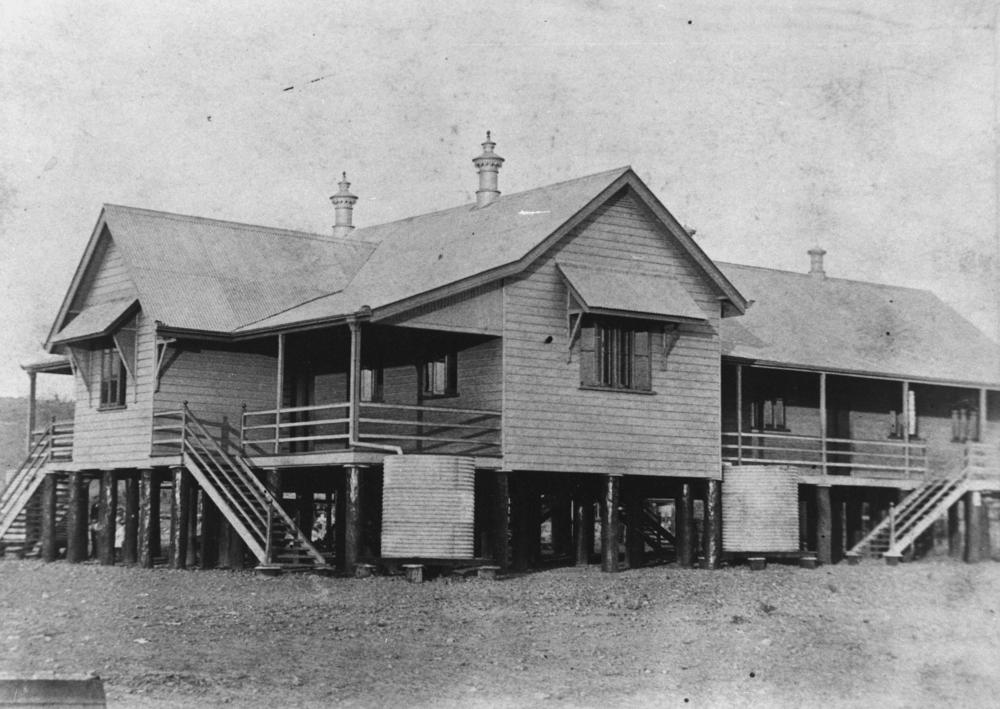
Croydon State School, circa 1893

Croydon State School is a government primary (Early Childhood to Year 6) school for boys and girls at 22–30 Brown Street (18.2037°S 142.2493°E). In 2014, the school had 42 students enrolled with 2 classes (years P–3 and years 4–6) with 3 teachers. In 2018, the school had an enrolment of 36 students with 3 teachers and 7 non-teaching staff (3 full-time equivalent).

There are no secondary schools nearby. The alternatives are distance education and boarding school.

== Facilities ==
Croydon has a swimming pool, golf course, lawn bowls, a museum, a tourist information centre, caravan park and a primary school. The Croydon Shire Council operates a public library at 63 Samwell Street.

Water supply is sourced from Lake Belmore.

St Margaret's Church at Lot 9, Alldridge Street is shared by the Anglican and Catholic congregations. It is within the Gulf Savannah Parish of the Roman Catholic Diocese of Cairns.

== In popular culture ==
Croydon was mentioned in the 1950 novel A Town Like Alice by Nevil Shute, as an example of a largely abandoned gold rush town.
