= Town of Croydon =

Local government area of Queensland, Australia

Coordinates: 18.202°S 142.245°E

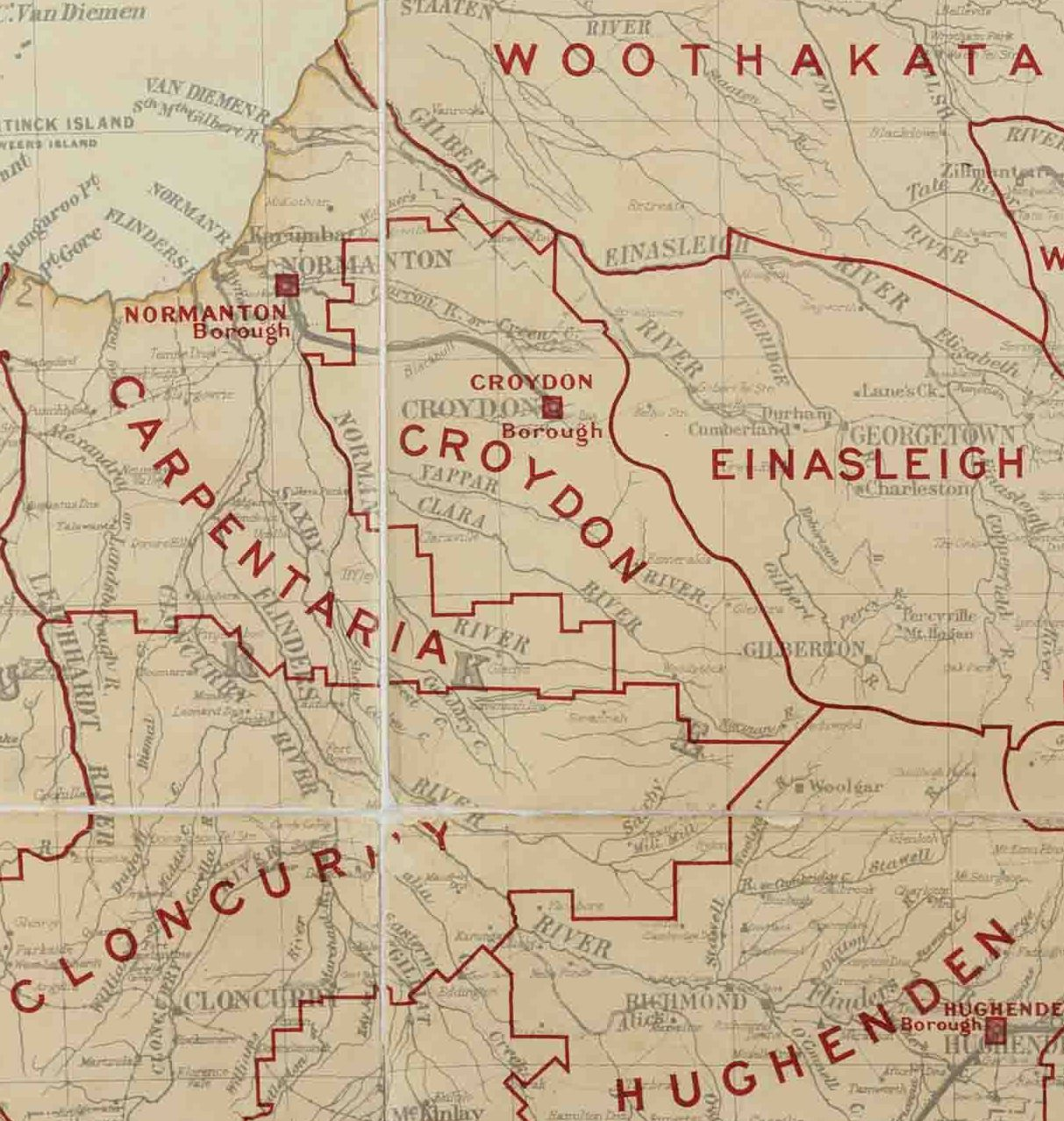
Map of Borough of Croydon and adjacent local government areas, March 1902

The Town of Croydon was a local government area for the governance of Croydon, Queensland, Australia. It existed from 1892 to 1908.

== History ==
The Borough of Croydon was established in 1868 as a municipal council for Croydon.

With the passing of the Local Authorities Act 1902, on 31 March 1903 the Borough of Croydon became the Town of Croydon.

On 19 December 1908, the Town of Croydon was absorbed into the surrounding Shire of Croydon.

== Croydon Town Hall ==
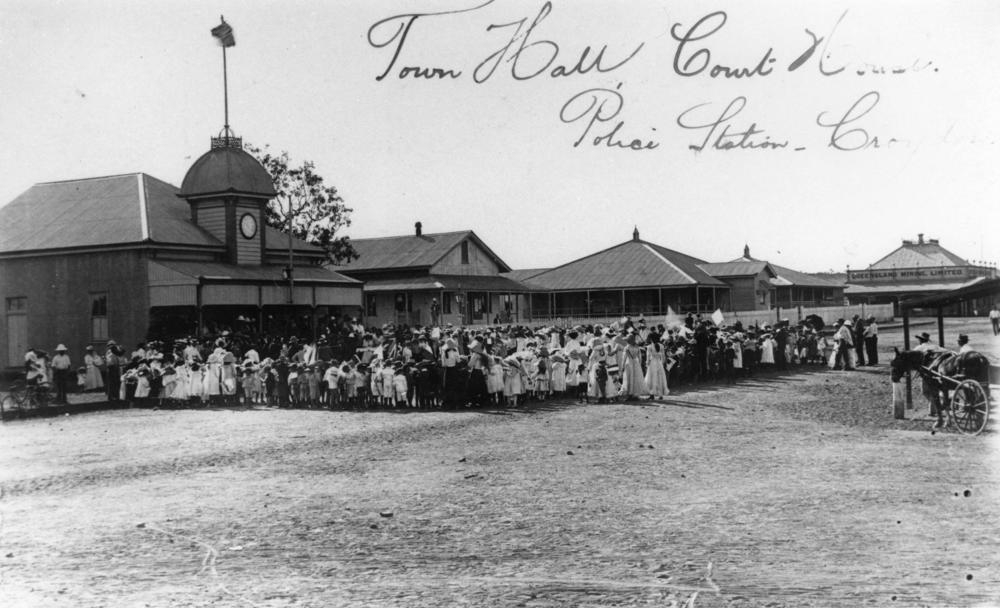
A large crowd is gathered in the main street of Croydon, circa 1901, possibly to celebrate Federation. Buildings include the Town Hall, Court House and Police Station. The Queensland Mining building is at the bottom of the street.

The Croydon Town Hall was believed to be built about 1892 as a town hall. It is located on the northern side of Samwell Street, right to the right of the intersection with Temple Street. In the 1960s the town hall became the headquarters of the Croydon Shire Council until 1991 when the shire built new offices of the other side of Samwell Street. The building was listed on the Queensland Heritage Register on 11 June 1996.

== Mayors ==
The mayors of the Town of Croydon were:

- 1892: H.F. Morgan
- 1893: J.W. Chandler
- 1894–1895: J.M. Temple
- 1896: T.P.V. Tabart
- 1897–1898: James Rogers
- 1899: Charles Maslen
- 1900: A. Morrison
- 1901: Edward P. Barnett
- 1902: A. Morrison
- 1903: T.H. Waldie
- 1904–1907: Vincent Creagh
- 1908: G . Pass
