= Chinese Temple and Settlement Site, Croydon =

Chinese Temple and Settlement Site
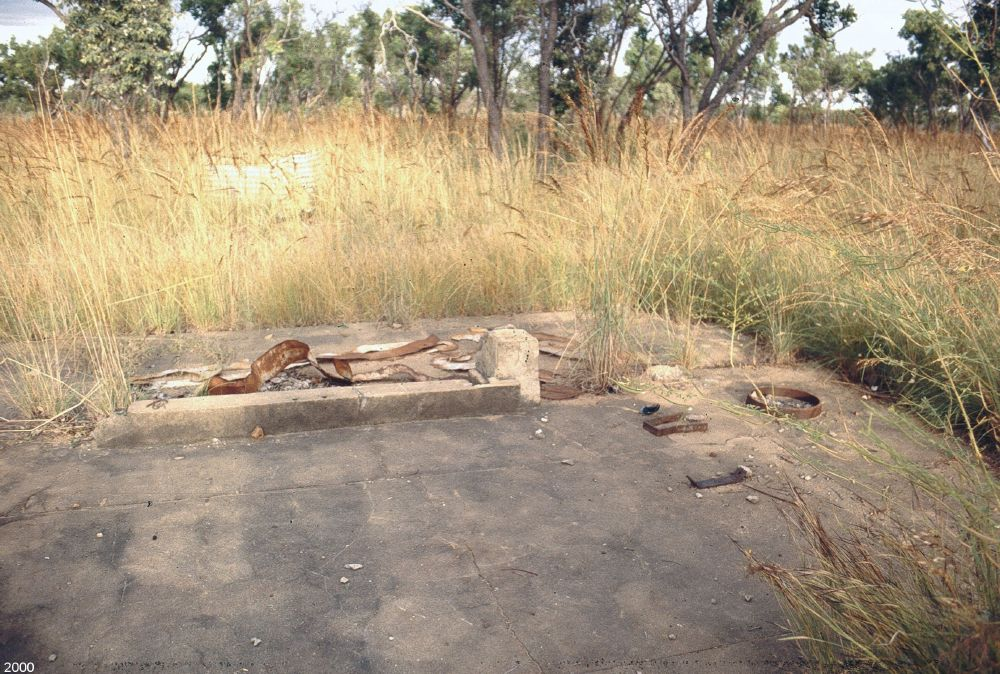
- Chinese Temple and Settlement Site, 2000

- Location within Queensland Location within Australia
- 18.1984°S 142.2472°E
- Location: Off Gulf Developmental Road, Croydon, Shire of Croydon, Queensland, Australia

History
- Design period: 1870s–1890s (late 19th century)
- Built: Circa 1880s

Queensland Heritage Register
- Official name: Chinese Temple and Settlement Site
- Type: state heritage (archaeological)
- Designated: 28 July 2000
- Reference no.: 602079
- Significant period: 1880s–1910s (historical) ongoing (social)
- Significant components: hall – assembly, temple

Chinese Temple and Settlement Site is a heritage-listed temple off Gulf Developmental Road, Croydon, Shire of Croydon, Queensland, Australia. It was built circa 1880s. It was added to the Queensland Heritage Register on 28 July 2000.

== History ==
Chinese settlers moved into the Croydon area soon after the gold discovery was reported in 1885. From the earliest days of settlement they played a significant role in the viability of the isolated field by supplying fresh vegetables and fruit. They also supported the work of the miners as cooks, carriers and by working on tribute.

Gold was discovered on Croydon Downs Station soon after it was established on Belmore Creek, north west Queensland in the early 1880s. However, it was not until 1885 that the manager William Chalmer Browne and station hands Walter and James Aldridge located twenty payable lines of gold reef. A rush began to the area when the discovery was reported in October.

On 18 January 1886 Croydon was proclaimed a goldfield under the administration of the Queensland Mines Department. The town was surveyed the same year. By the end of 1887 Mining Warden L.E.D. Towner reported that the town had been transformed from a rough mining camp to a flourishing and well built centre with a population of approximately 3500 of whom 300 were Chinese, Cingalese, Malays and African. These figures are surprising given that under the Queensland Goldfields Amendment Act of 1878 Chinese were excluded from a gold field for three years unless they had made the discovery.

Despite these legislative restrictions Chinese settlers moved into the area soon after gold was found. It has been suggested that their involvement was primarily "... as gardeners, cooks, and carriers". No Chinese held claims at Croydon, although some worked on tribute for other miners. The majority however, worked as market gardeners on 172 acres (70 ha) surveyed in the town plan as garden areas. The Chinese were the chief providers of fresh fruit and vegetables on the goldfields usually growing fruit such as custard apples, mandarins, watermelons and lemons.

The Chinese settlement at Croydon developed on the north west fringe of the town. This was a similar pattern to other mining towns in north Queensland. The community constructed a temple, houses and associated facilities such as pig ovens, with the temple as the central focus of the settlement.

Temples were not simply places of religious worship, rather, they were an integral part of the village. They were places to meet, to check one's horoscope before embarking on a new venture and places where ancestors were venerated. In China each rural village may have had several temples. Each temple was primarily dedicated to a single deity. Emigrant Chinese in Australia generally adopted the practice of only one temple unless there were socially disparate clans within the same town. Temples in Australia had a single deity in a central role, supplemented by several other deities. They were not necessarily "lesser gods" but, in the temple were given a supplementary status to the major deity.

Given the temple's role as the central focus of daily life, the community would worship at any time. Major gatherings were reserved for festival days when the community gathered to worship, feast and to hold processions.

Apart from being places of worship and community activity temples of the late nineteenth and early twentieth century provided an important social welfare role. This role was based on the Confucian principle of Universalism, which stated that:

When the great principle of Universalism prevails the world will become the common property of all; the people will elect men of virtue, talent and capability; they will act in good faith and fellowship ... Provision will be made for the aged till their death, employment given to the able- bodied, and the means for self-development given to the young ... Perfect security will prevail everywhere."

The goldfield had a relatively short life but the size and form of the temple was far more substantial than would be expected in an itinerant community. The floor plan shows that the temple was slightly larger than the Atherton temple where the regional Chinese population exceeded 1000. According to a 1986 analysis of the Australian Chinese population after 1881, Sydney, with 3,500 and Melbourne, with 2,400 were the two key centres of population. Research showed that the total Chinese population in all other colonial capitals did not exceed 500 in each place. So Croydon, with an average of 300 people, probably had one of the largest Chinese populations in regional Australia.

Race relations on the Croydon goldfield have not been researched extensively. A "... minor "roll up" against the Chinese occurred in September 1886 and in 1888 the Amalgamated Miners Association's demands that all aliens leave the field initiated further conflict. While anti-Chinese sentiment was demonstrated across north Queensland at that time, contemporary reports, newspaper articles and government documentation indicate that generally good commercial and social interactions prevailed between the Chinese and local communities on the goldfields. Evidence of the long term occupation of the Chinese settlement and temple site at Croydon, the graves of Chinese buried throughout Croydon cemeteries, and the continuing presence of descendants of the Chinese still living in Croydon seems to support this.

While the Croydon goldfield was initially highly lucrative the boom years were short lived. After a peak in gold production in 1900, mining declined during the next two decades. The first three years of the century were so dry that crushing was restricted and after 1905 output fell as water threatened operating mines. The town was damaged in a tropical cyclone in 1906 at a time when the community could ill afford the loss. Mining continued to decline until 1914 when the last Golden Gate mine closed. Crushing ceased in 1918.

Remaining evidence of Chinese occupation of the site would indicate that people utilised the temple site for a considerable period in the twentieth century. Several Croydon families are descended from the early Chinese settlers.

== Description ==
The Chinese Temple and settlement site is located north west of the township of Croydon. The site is situated between the Gulf Developmental Road and the low hills to the north of the site.

Artefacts are spread over a considerable area although the physical remains of structures are located in the town block bounded by Charles, Kelman, Nicholas and Edward Streets.

=== The Temple ===
The description of the Croydon site and use of the remnant structures has been based on the extant Hou Wang Temple, Atherton.

The remnants of the temple are the main feature within the town block. The concrete temple foundations comprise a main building with overall dimensions of 22 by 6 metres (72 by 20 ft). The temple is orientated NE-SW with the main entrance facing SW. The building comprised: a 4 by 6 metres (13 by 20 ft) front section, possibly with a suspended roof; a 1.7 metres (5 ft 7 in) deep, covered porch; an internal concrete floor 6 metres (20 ft) wide and 10.75 metres (35.3 ft) long; a rear section, probably on low timber stumps, 6 metres (20 ft) wide and 7 metres (23 ft) long.

A large spread of granite chips extends 4 metres (13 ft) from the entrance. Four postholes at the SW extremity of the granite indicate that the porch may have extended beyond the main building. Poles probably supported a suspended roof over a raised timber deck.

A 2.5 metres (8 ft 2 in) square sunken section is located at the rear of the large concrete slab. It was probably the section known as the 'sunken courtyard or "heavenly well". It was a central offertory area within the temple where incense sticks might be burned.

Six sandstone bases remain in their appropriate location. Two others were removed from the site and are now located at a private residence in Croydon. The bases have been carved to broadly represent the form of the lotus flower. The use of carved sandstone seems to indicate that someone in the community was competent in the art of stone masonry. Rare sandstone burial markers on a number of the Chinese graves in local cemeteries seem to support this theory.

=== Caretaker's House and Meeting Hall ===
There are traces of a second building 2.5 metres (8 ft 2 in) south of the temple. There is evidence of several postholes and remnant walls of corrugated iron embedded in the ground. Preliminary investigation indicates that this structure had an earthen floor. In the narrow passage between this building and the temple there is a mound of earth, which probably supported a tank stand.

=== The "Pig Oven" or Outdoor Oven ===
Twenty six metres to the south east of the temple foundations are the remains of a stone or "pig" oven. The oven, built of local stone, was held together with a mixture of mud and broken termite mounds, to form a wall 600 millimetres (24 in) thick. It was 2.2 metres (7 ft 3 in) in diameter and stood well above the present 1.2 metres (3 ft 11 in) height. The upper section has collapsed. The collapsed stone now radiates out to approximately 1. to 1.2 metres (3 ft 11 in) from the base of the structure. To date no other Chinese ovens have been located in north Queensland although a number have been identified in the Northern Territory.

=== Other Structures ===
Traces of a small structure are located to the nor north west of the "Pig" Oven. Evidence of a remnant corrugated iron wall indicates that this is a similar structure to the Caretaker's House near the temple.

To the south east of the temple, straddling Charles Street, is a collection of foundations of several houses. Small rooms, passageways and entrances are outlined by stone. Remnants of a second, small outdoor oven are located between two of these buildings.

=== Dump ===
A modern dump is located to the south west of the Temple outside the boundary of the town block containing remnant buildings. It holds a considerable amount of material from across the site including old bikes, matchboxes, broken crockery, household pots and pans, and corrugated iron.

=== Artefact Scatters ===
While most larger pieces of material have been collected into the dump the site is still covered with a vast quantity of material. Matchboxes, pot and pans, broken pottery shards, and corrugated iron. Pieces of sheet metal, cut in decorative patterns, which may have been fixed to the roof ridge of the temple, are scattered round close to the temple.

== Heritage listing ==
Chinese Temple and Settlement Site was listed on the Queensland Heritage Register on 28 July 2000 having satisfied the following criteria.

The place is important in demonstrating the evolution or pattern of Queensland's history.

The Chinese Temple and Settlement site, Croydon demonstrates the extent of Chinese involvement in exploitation of natural resources in Australia in the nineteenth century especially their crucial contribution to the viability of isolated settlements associated with the goldfields.

With over three hundred people residing there at its height, the Chinese settlement at Croyden was, at that time, one of the largest Chinese communities in regional Australia. Although a typical goldfield community where race relations were sometimes volatile, surviving physical evidence of the settlement and contemporary documentation indicates the Chinese created a successful community at Croydon.

The Croydon settlement demonstrates the pattern of other Chinese settlements in north Queensland, including the location; on the fringe of the main town servicing a goldfield and the inclusion of a temple as the central focus of the settlement.

The place demonstrates rare, uncommon or endangered aspects of Queensland's cultural heritage.

Of particular significance are the two remnant "pig" ovens, which are rare examples of ovens on a Chinese settlement site in Queensland.

The place has potential to yield information that will contribute to an understanding of Queensland's history.

The remains of the settlement, including the foundation of the temple and associated buildings, several house foundations, extensive artefact scatters, and a dump of material gathered from the site have the potential to yield further information about the Chinese communities which flourished in Queensland in the nineteenth century. Of particular significance are the two remnant "pig" ovens, which are rare examples of ovens on a Chinese settlement site in Queensland.

The place has a strong or special association with a particular community or cultural group for social, cultural or spiritual reasons.

The place has a special association with Chinese settlers in Australia and their descendants.

The place has a special association with the life or work of a particular person, group or organisation of importance in Queensland's history.

The Chinese Temple and Settlement site, Croydon demonstrates the extent of Chinese involvement in exploitation of natural resources in Australia in the nineteenth century especially their crucial contribution to the viability of isolated settlements associated with the goldfields.
