= John Graham MacDonald =

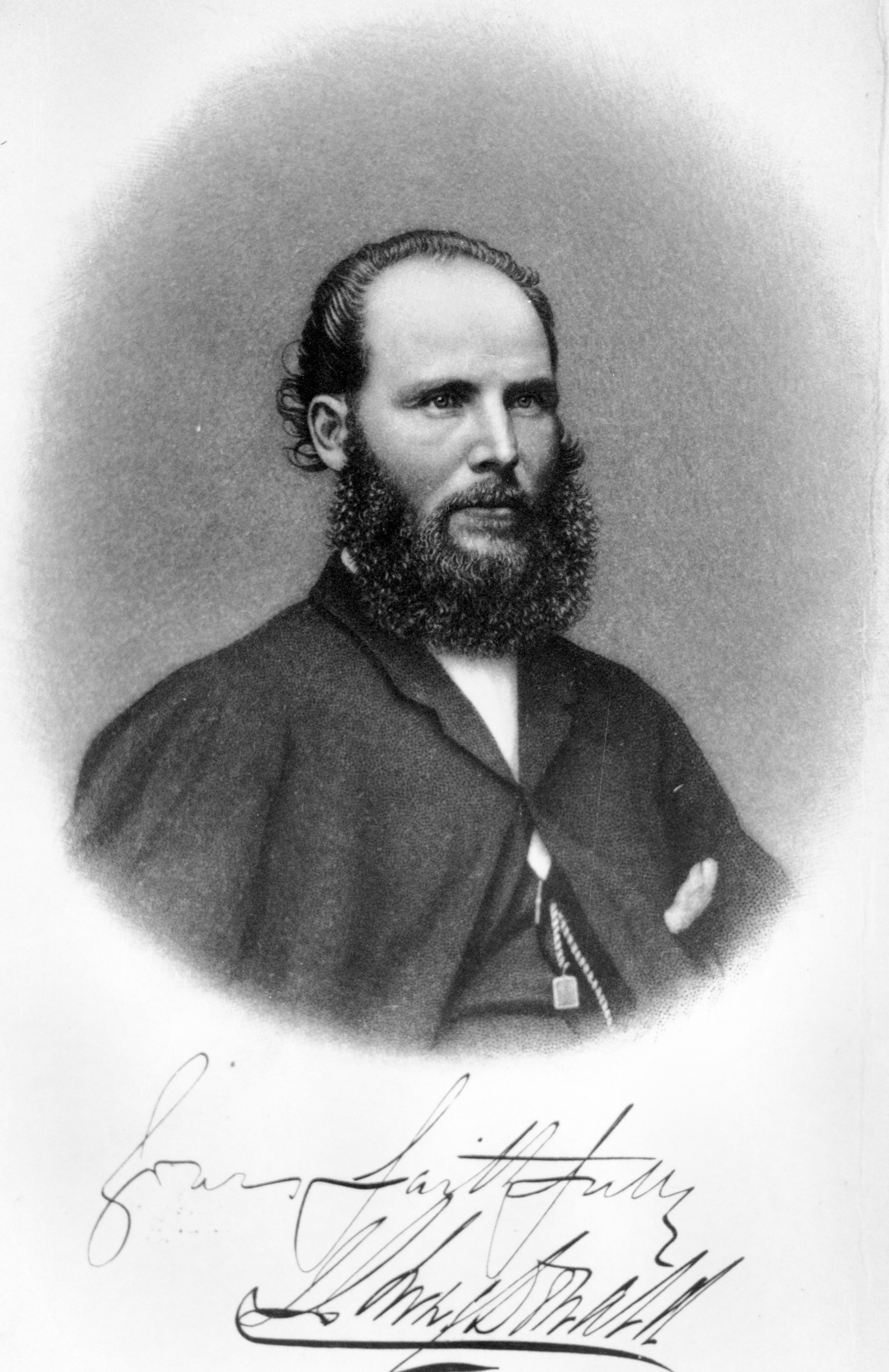
John Graham MacDonald, 1865

John Graham MacDonald (1834–1918) was an explorer and pioneer in Queensland, Australia.

== Early life ==
Macdonald was born at Campbelltown, near Sydney, New South Wales on the 5th of September 1834. At the age of 18 years he joined his brother, a civil engineer, in Victoria, and gained a considerable knowledge of engineering and surveying. A few years later he took up farming near Geelong, and became a model farmer of the district and chairman of the local farmers' association (probably the first farmers' association established in Australia), the chairman of the local road board, and a judge for the Geelong Agricultural Society.

== Explorer and pioneer in Queensland ==
In May 1859, he sold out his Victorian interests, and came to Queensland, joining another brother, Peter Fitzallan MacDonald, of Yaamba, near Rockhampton. Soon afterwards the two brothers started on their first exploration tour. They explored the head waters of the Nogoa and Belyando Rivers, where they took up a large area of pastoral country. Two years after the separation of Queensland in 1859, John Macdonald explored the districts drained by the Burdekin, Einasleigh and Lynd Rivers, and, on behalf of Southern financiers, amongst whom were Sir John Robertson and Captain Robert Towns, he established the Inkerman, Strathbogie, Dalrymple, Kirknie, Leichhardt Downs, and Carpentaria Downs pastoral stations. In the following year, on behalf of this adventurous firm of station promoters, John Macdonald, accompanied by two stockmen and some Aboriginal boys, explored the Gulf country (around the Gulf of Carpentaria) and took up great pastoral areas in the neighbourhood of where Burketown and Normanton now stand. For more than 10 years Mr. Macdonald managed pastoral stations stretching between Inkerman, near Bowen, and the Plains of Promise near the present site of Burketown, contending against floods, droughts, and other difficulties.

== Public servant ==
In 1872 MacDonald relinquished his pastoral pursuits and was appointed police magistrate and gold commissioner at Gilberton. Soon afterwards he was transferred to Charters Towers, where he performed well, especially during the very disturbing period of 1873 on that field. During the next twenty years, he filled positions of police magistrate, mining warden, and land commissioner at Springsure, Bowen, Townsville, and Warwick. In 1903 he was appointed Police Magistrate at South Brisbane, an office which he filled until his retirement under the age limit in 1905. Mr Macdonald was over 70 years of age when he retired from the magisterial bench, but still desired to be active, so he became the chairman of probably a dozen wages boards, just then being established in accordance with an Act passed by the Kidston Government. Subsequently, he became visiting Justice to St Helena Island, Boggo Road Gaol, and the various industrial schools and benevolent and mental asylums in the metropolitan district, an office which he filled with great tact and ability until his death.

As a magistrate, visiting justice, and chairman of wages boards Mr. Macdonald was known as a reasonable person. He did not browbeat a witness, or lecture an accused person, or dictate, to the persons seeking to arrive at some agreement. Amiability and the ability to understand human nature was the key to his success.

== Later life ==
John MacDonald died on the morning of 29 May 1918 at the age of 84 years at South Brisbane. He had been ill for some weeks, and died peacefully in hospital. He was survived by his widow, one son, W. B. Macdonald, a solicitor at Hughenden, and two daughters, Mrs. E. B. Wareham and Mrs. J. A. Rae of Inkerman station in North Queensland. He was buried on 30 May 1918 in Toowong Cemetery.

== Legacy ==
MacDonald's house in Townsville, Kardinia, was listed on the Queensland Heritage Register in 1992.
