= Shire of Croydon =

Coordinates: 18°12′10″S 142°14′39″E

- Local government area
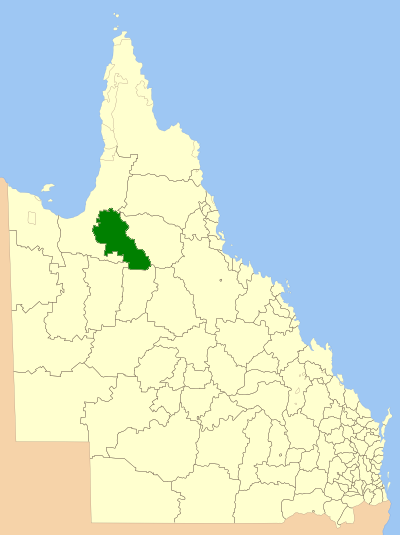
- Location within Queensland

- Interactive map of Shire of Croydon
- Country: Australia
- State: Queensland
- Region: Far North Queensland
- Established: 1887
- Council seat: Croydon

Government
  - Mayor: Trevor Pickering
  - State electorate: Traeger
  - Federal division: Kennedy

Area
  - Total: 29,498 km^{2} (11,389 sq mi)

Population
  - Total: 266 (2021 census)
  - Density: 0.009018/km^{2} (0.02336/sq mi)
- Website: Shire of Croydon
LGAs around Shire of Croydon
Carpentaria	Carpentaria	Tablelands
Carpentaria	Shire of Croydon	Etheridge
McKinlay	Richmond	Richmond

The Shire of Croydon is a local government area in western Queensland, Australia. The shire, administered from the town of Croydon, covers an area of 29,498 square kilometres (11,389.2 sq mi). The council consists of a mayor plus four councillors, each of whom represents the entire Shire.

In the 2021 census, the Shire of Croydon had a population of 266 people.

== History ==
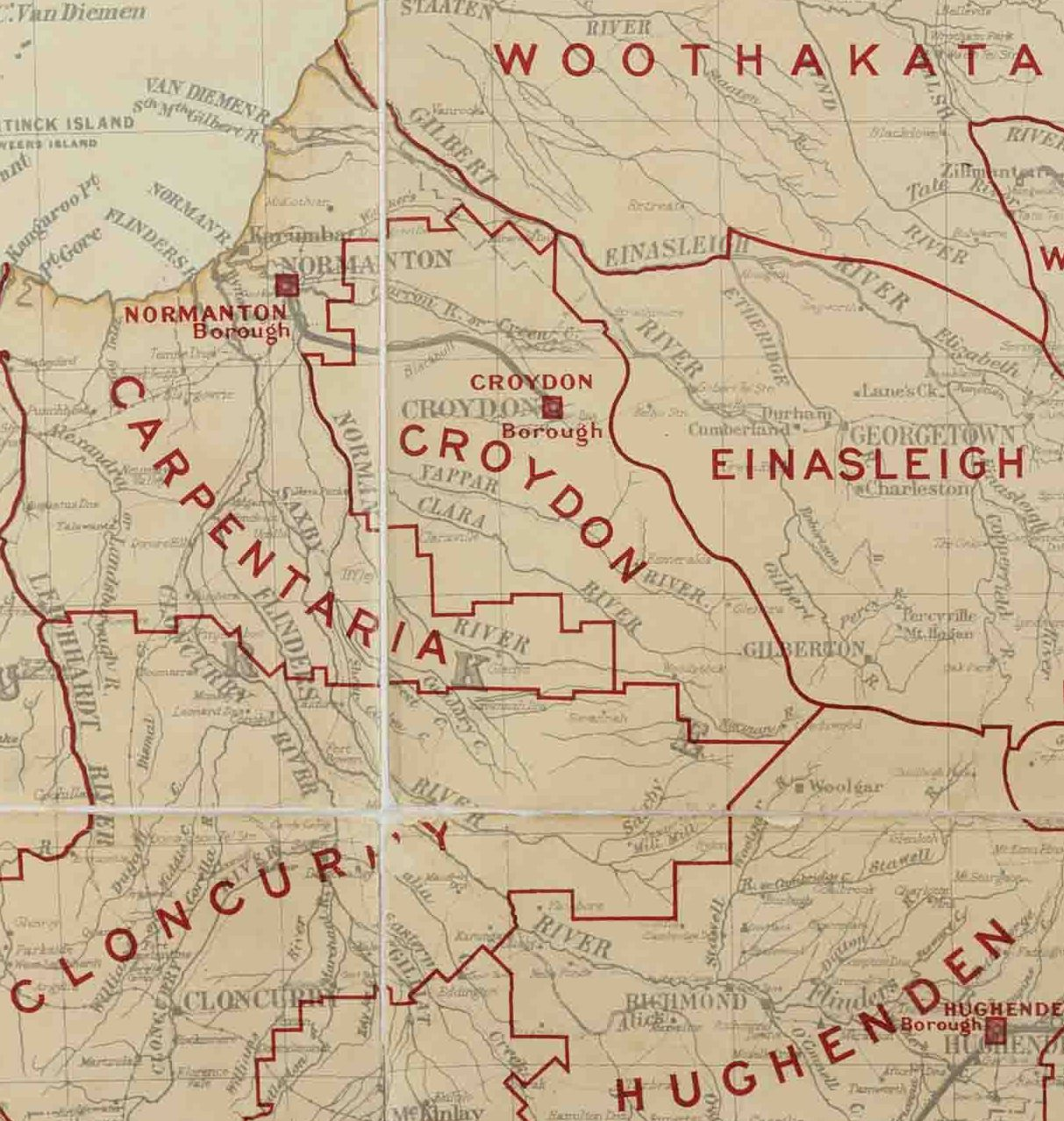
Map of Croydon Division and adjacent local government areas, March 1902

The area was originally settled as part of a gold rush in the 1880s, and at one time had a population of 7,000. The Croydon Division was created on 31 December 1887 under the Divisional Boards Act 1887.

With the passage of the Local Authorities Act 1902, the Croydon Division became the Shire of Croydon 31 March 1903.

At one stage the Town of Croydon was responsible for the town itself; however, this was dissolved into the Shire on 1 January 1909.

== Amalgamation ==
Croydon, like many western local government areas, was not affected by amalgamations in 2007–2008, mainly because of the large geographical size and remoteness of the shire. Despite being rated as "weak" by the Financial Sustainability Review, analysis by the Local Government Commissioners revealed this to be due to factors upon which amalgamation would have no effect.

== Towns and localities ==
The Shire of Croydon includes the following settlements:

- Croydon
- Blackbull

== Libraries ==
Croydon Shire Council operates a public library at Croydon.

== Demographics ==
Year	Population	Notes
1933	318	
1947	167	
1954	161	
1961	181	
1966	162	
1971	236	
1976	222	
1981	255	
1986	324	
1991	281	
1996	316	
2001 census	325	
2006 census	255	
2011 census	312	
2016 census	294	
2021 census	266	

== Chairmen and mayors ==
Chairmen

- 1892: E.S. Ross
- 1927: William M. O'Flaherty

=== Mayors ===
- 2008–2012: Cornelia Bernardina (Corrie) Pickering
- 2012–present: Trevor Joseph Pickering
