= Gulflander =

Passenger train in Queensland, Australia

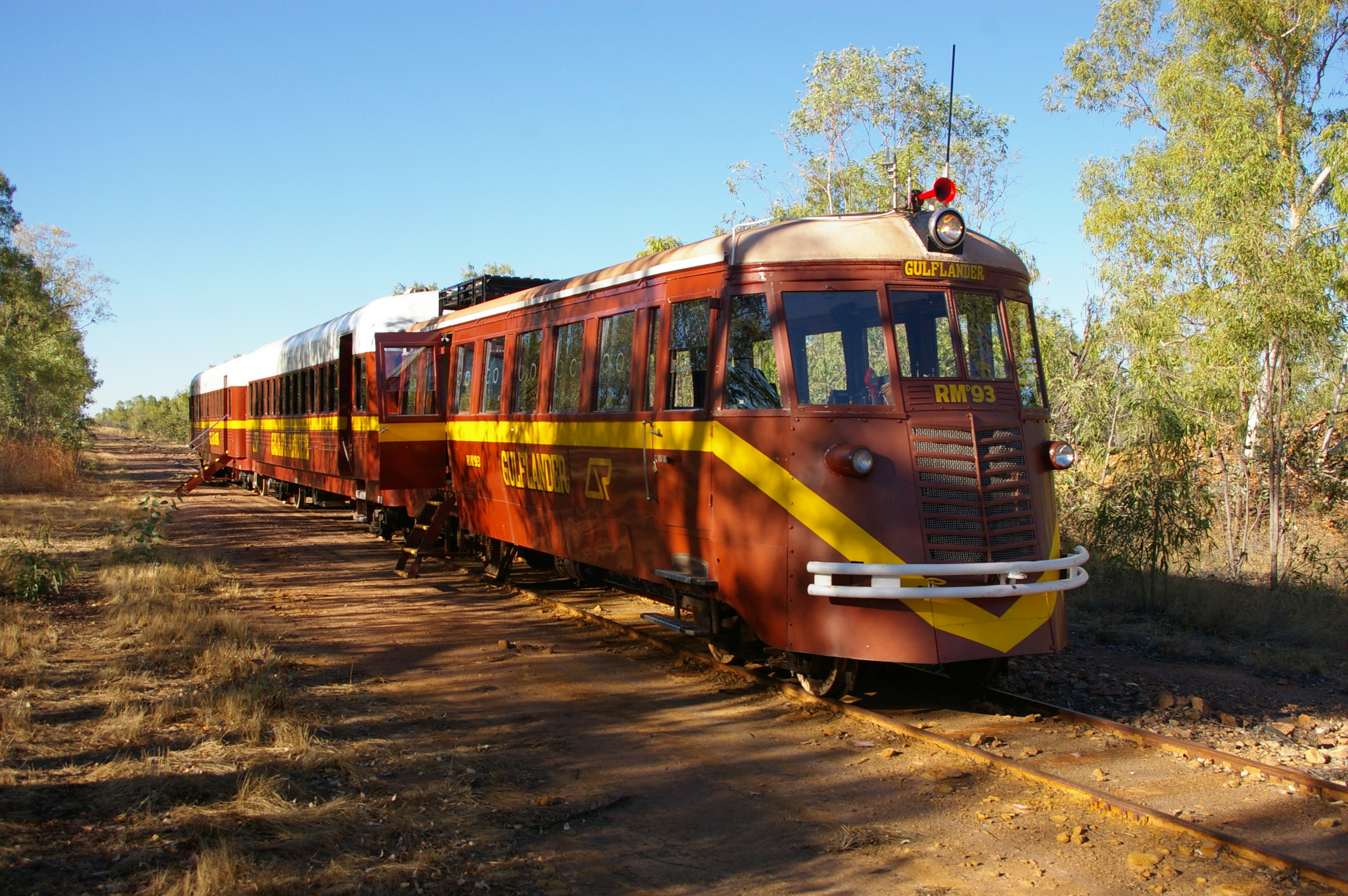
- RM93 at Golden Gate near Croydon in August 2008

Overview
- Service type: Passenger train
- Current operator: Queensland Rail

Route
- Termini: Normanton; Croydon
- Distance travelled: 151 kilometres
- Average journey time: 5 hours full trip 2 hour short trips
- Service frequency: Weekly and daily
- Line used: Normanton

On-board services
- Seating arrangements: 100
- Catering facilities: Morning Tea
- Entertainment facilities: Guided Commentary
- Baggage facilities: Yes

Technical
- Track gauge: 1,067 mm (3 ft 6 in)
- Operating speed: 40km/h
- Track owner: Queensland Rail

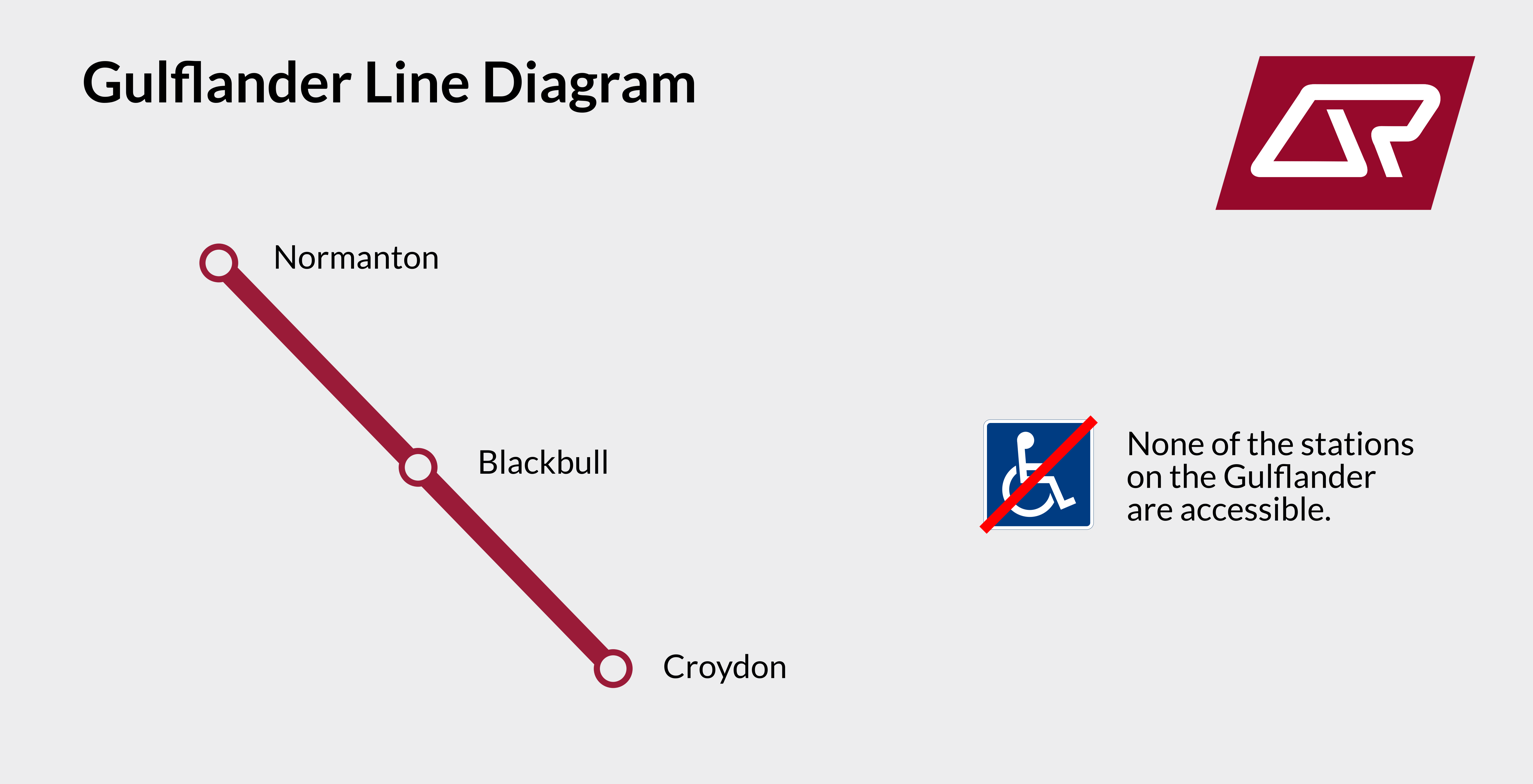
Route diagram of the Gulflander

The Gulflander is a passenger train operated by Queensland Rail on the isolated Normanton to Croydon line in the Gulf Country of northern Queensland, Australia.

== History ==
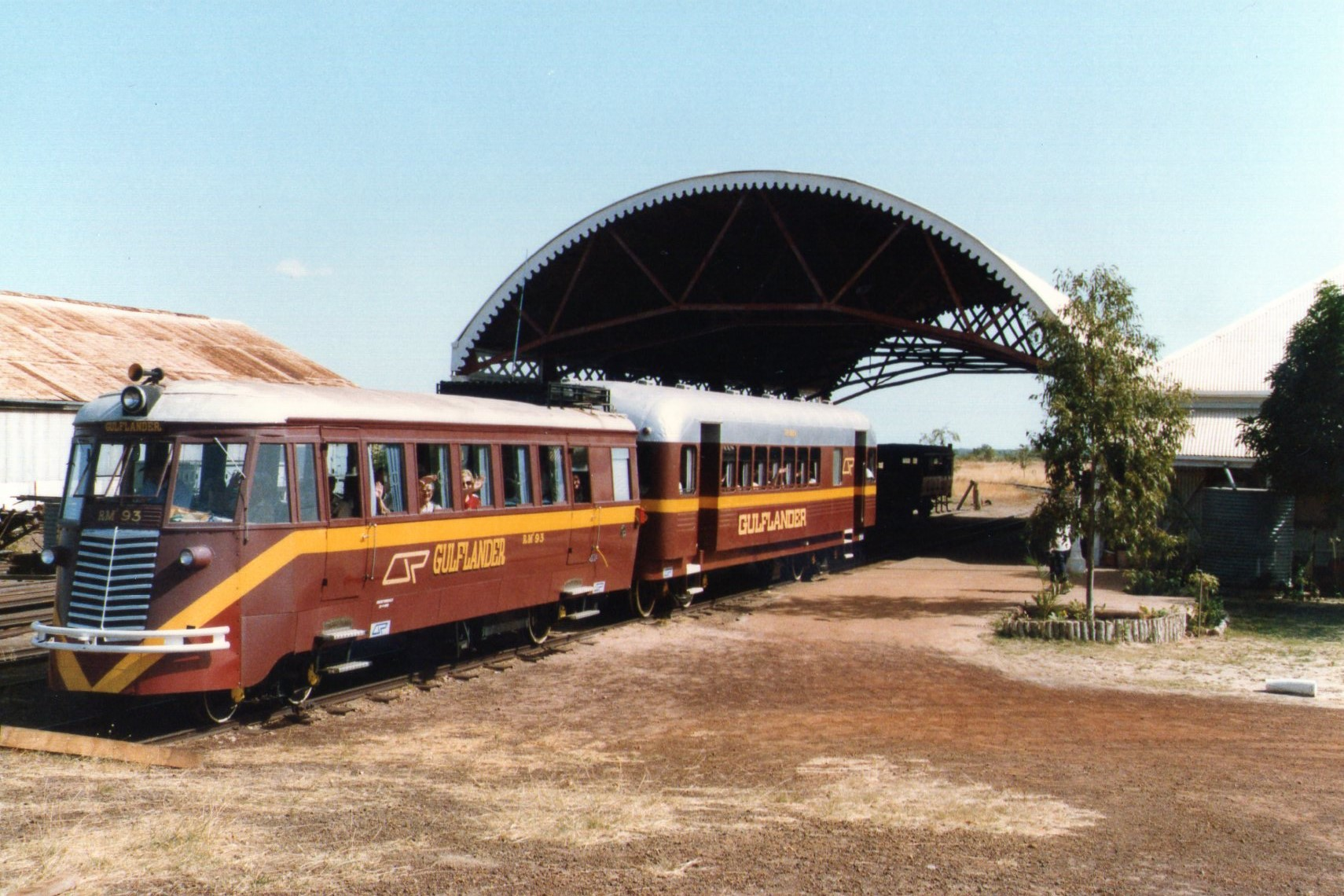
RM93 and trailer about to depart Normanton on its weekly run to Croydon in July 1991

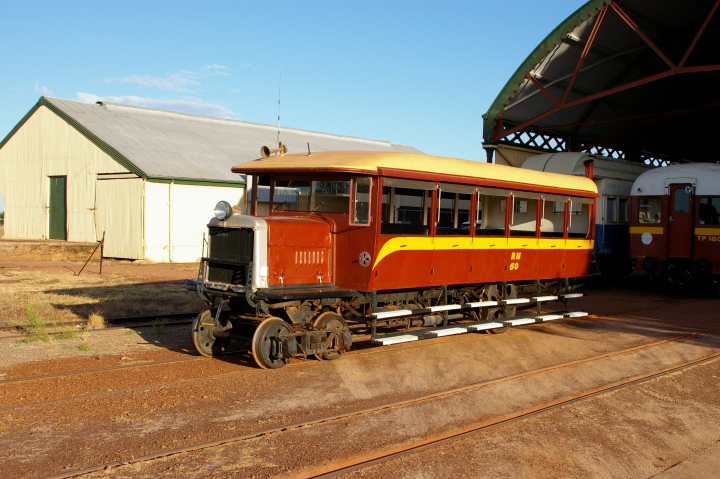
RM60 at Normanton in May 2008

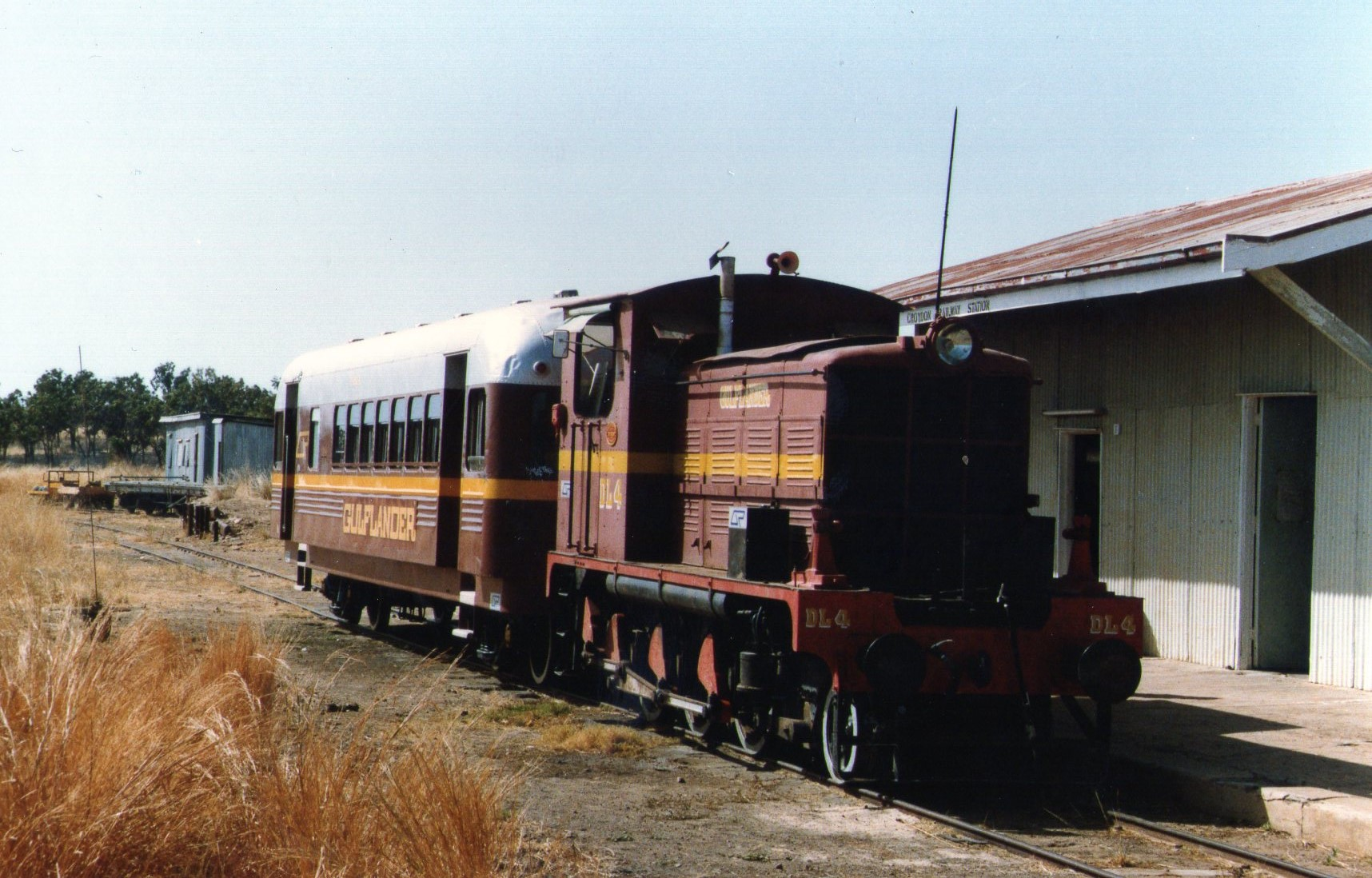
DL4 at Normanton in July 1991

Steam locomotives were used until 1929. By that stage railmotors had been introduced since 1922. By 1974 the line was under the threat of closure, earning just $3,000 in revenue but costing $64,000 to maintain.

Today the line exists as a tourist attraction and is said to be more an adventure than a train ride. The crews are qualified guides and will stop the train and talk about points of interest. The present three-car railmotor set of RM93 Gardner diesel railmotor and carriages TP1809 and TP1811 is known as "the old Tin Hare".

== Service ==
The service runs once per week to Croydon on Wednesdays, returning to Normanton on Thursdays. Shorter charter services on most other days are also available.

== Rollingstock ==
Thirteen power units have been used on the line. It is unusual that of the 13 units, 12 survive in one form or another and most are still in the region due mainly to its remoteness. They are as follows:

- A10 class steam locomotive 202, undergoing restoration to operational condition by Croydon Shire Council
- A10 class steam locomotive 203, used as parts for the restoration of 202
- A10 class steam locomotive 204, on display at Croydon station
- B12 class steam locomotive 28, on display at Normanton station
- B13 class steam locomotive 161, on display at Normanton station
- B13 class steam locomotive 234, on display at Normanton station
- RM14 Panhard-Levassor petrol railmotor, operated Gulflander 1923–1929, returned to Normanton for 120th anniversary in 2011, on display at Workshops Rail Museum
- RM31 AEC petrol railmotor, operated Gulflander 1929–1945, eventual fate unknown
- RM32 AEC petrol railmotor, operated Gulflander 1945–1960, on display at Normanton
- RM60 AEC petrol railmotor, operated Gulflander 1960–1964, operational at Normanton
- RM74 Gardner (formerly AEC) diesel railmotor, operated Gulflander 1964–1982, on display at Redland Museum, Cleveland
- RM93 Gardner diesel railmotor, operational at Normanton station, arrived 1982, hauls present Gulflander
- DL4 diesel-mechanical locomotive, arrived November 1988, operational at Normanton
- TP1809 carriage, former PL1809 passenger/luggage trailer transferred to Normanton in 1980, forms present Gulflander
- TP1811 carriage de-motored and reclassified RM1811, was the QR Commissioners Car throughout the 1980s before conversion and transfer to Normanton in 1991, forms present Gulflander
