= Normanton to Croydon railway line =

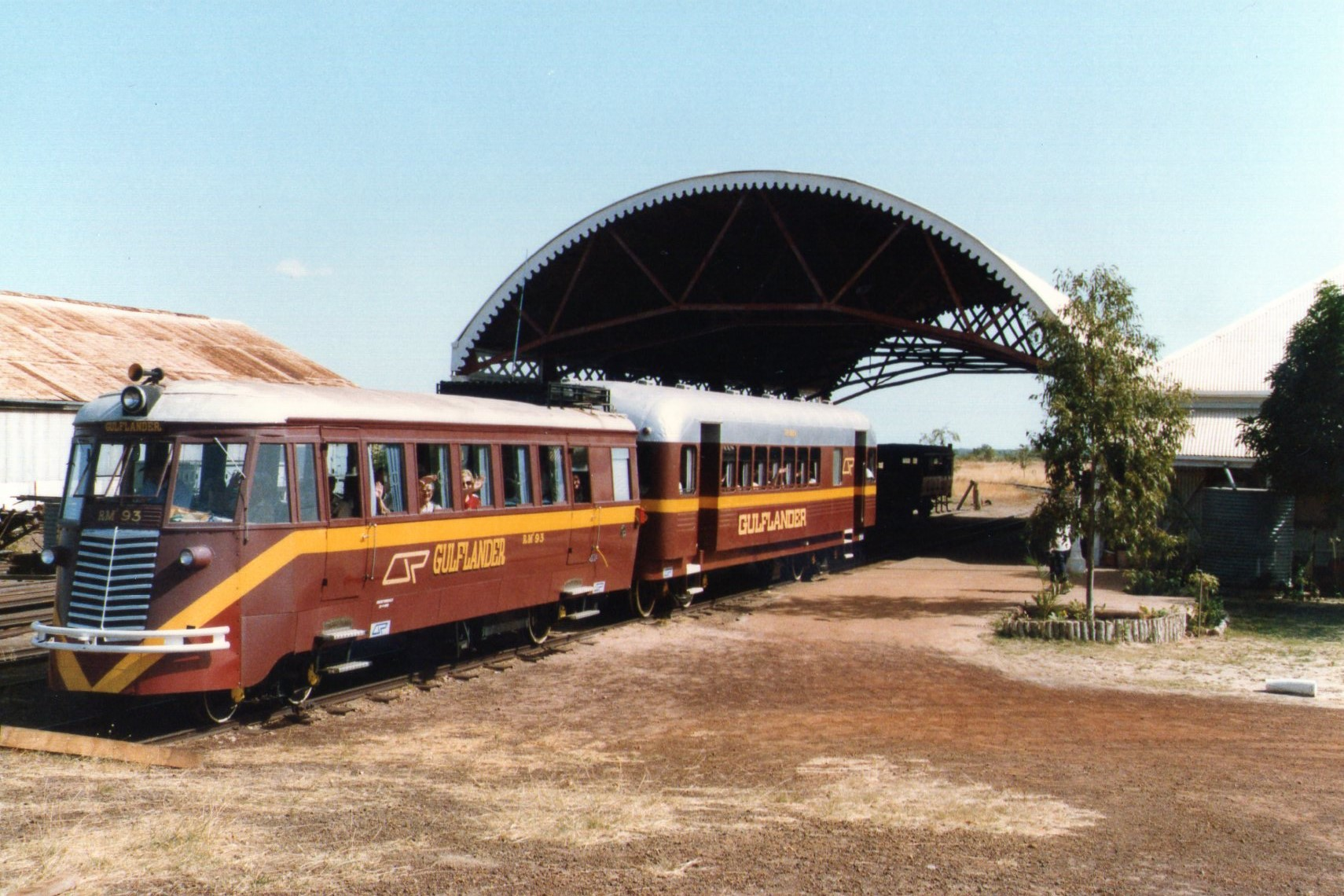
- RM93 and trailer on the Gulflander at Normanton, July 1991

Overview
- Other name: Normanton Railway
- Owner: Queensland Rail
- Termini: Normanton; Croydon
- Website: www.gulflander.com.au

Service
- Operator: Queensland Rail
- Depot: Normanton

History
- Opened: 20 July 1891

Technical
- Line length: 152 km (94 mi)
- Track gauge: 1,067 mm (3 ft 6 in)
- Operating speed: 40 km/h (25 mph)
- Signalling: None
- Train protection system: None

Gulflander
- Location within Queensland
- 17.9388°S 141.6549°E
- Location: Normanton to Croydon, Croydon, Shire of Croydon, Queensland, Australia

History
- Design period: 1870s–1890s (late 19th century)
- Built: 1888–1891

Queensland Heritage Register
- Official name: Normanton to Croydon Railway Line
- Type: state heritage (built, archaeological)
- Designated: 21 October 1992
- Reference no.: 600396
- Significant period: 1880s–1970s (fabric)
- Significant components: railway station, carriage shade (railway), railway, objects (movable) – transport – rail, crane / gantry, shed – shelter, tank stand, residential accommodation – workers' quarters, tank – water, machinery/plant/equipment – transport – rail, bridge/viaduct – railway, shed – goods, ramp

The Normanton to Croydon railway line is a heritage-listed railway line in the Gulf Country of northern Queensland, Australia. The railway line linking Normanton in the Shire of Carpentaria to Croydon in the Shire of Croydon was built between 1888 and 1891 and is the last isolated line of Queensland Rail still in use. It utilises an innovative system of submersible track with patented steel sleepers and retains buildings of considerable architectural and technical interest at its terminus in Normanton. The only train to operate on the line is the weekly Gulflander service operated by a Gardner diesel propelled railmotor and carriages TP1809 and TP1811.

It was added to the Queensland Heritage Register on 21 October 1992.

== History ==
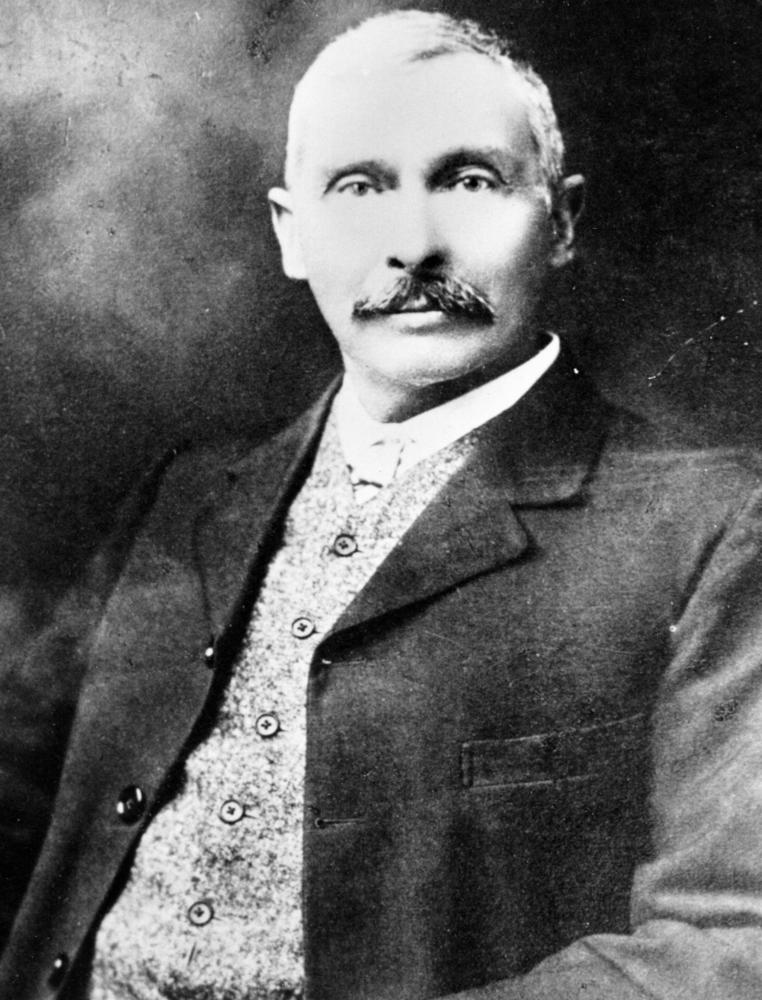
George Phillips, 1907

In 1867, William Landsborough investigated the Norman River area to select a port site to serve the pastoral stations south of the Gulf of Carpentaria. With him was George Phillips who shortly thereafter surveyed the chosen site of Normanton. Phillips later supervised the construction of the Normanton to Croydon Railway, and retained an interest in the area, serving as Member of the Queensland Legislative Assembly for Carpentaria in the 1890s.

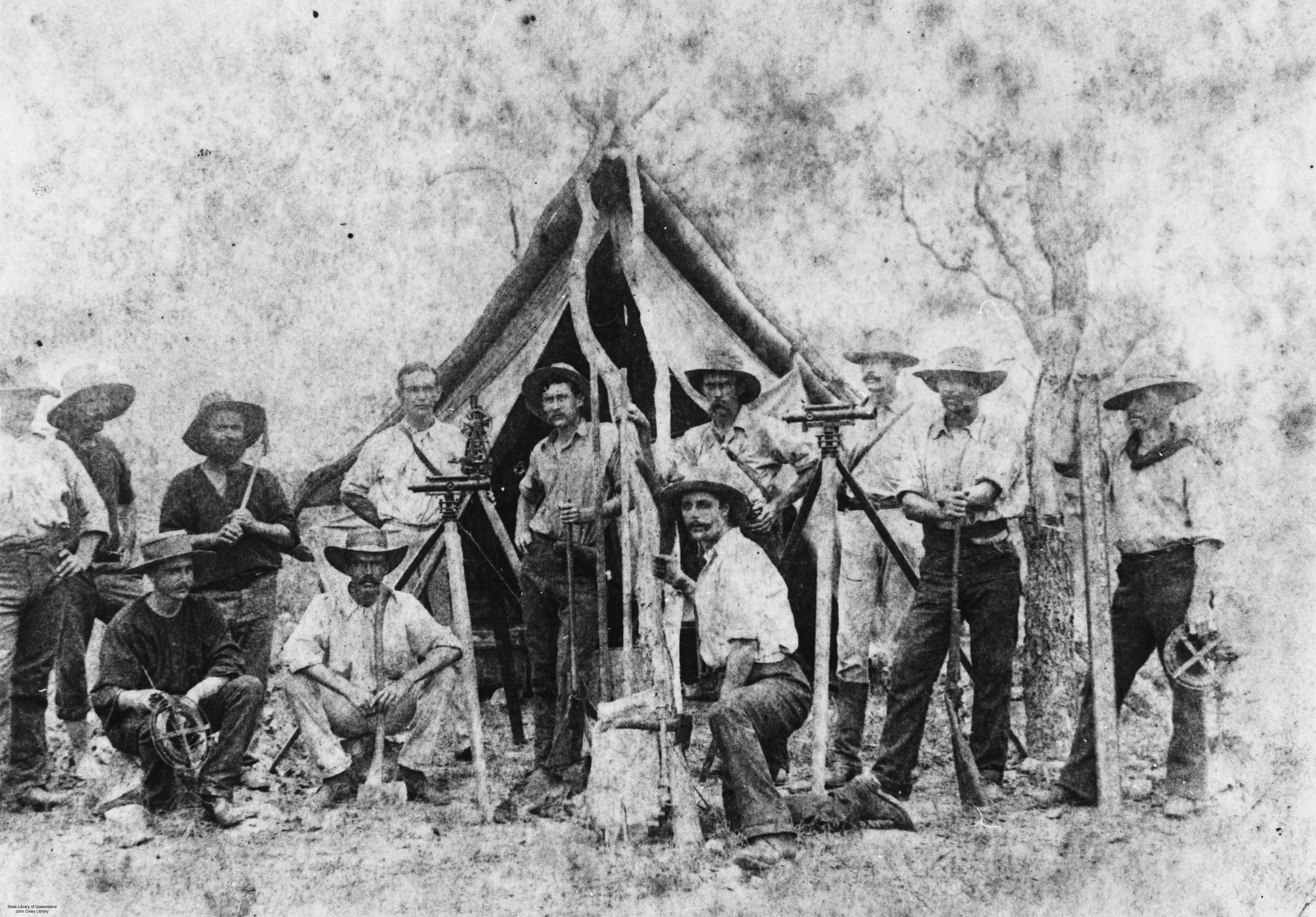
Bush camp on the Croydon to Normanton railway line.

A railway line between Normanton and Cloncurry had been discussed as early as 1883 and was approved by Queensland Parliament in 1886. This was a difficult stretch for carriers and a rail link would have been valuable to pastoral stations in the area and was planned to serve the Cloncurry Copper Mine. At that time, it was intended to eventually link the new line from Normanton with the Great Northern Railway at Charters Towers to provide access to the port of Townsville.

However, in November 1885, a major gold strike was reported at Belmore pastoral station, 145 kilometres (90 mi) east of Normanton and by the end of 1886, the population of the Croydon field was 2,000, rising to 6,000 in the following year. Transportation was a major problem and access to this field became more important than the link to Cloncurry. It was decided to divert the line to Croydon.

The line was technically innovative, in response to the terrain and conditions. The country was flat but difficult for conventional railway tracks due to flooding, lack of suitable timber for sleepers and termite attack. In 1884 Phillips patented a system for taking railways across such country which utilised special U-section steel sleepers laid directly on the ground. During floods the line could be submerged without washing out the ballast and embankments normally used, so that it could quickly be put back into service when the waters subsided. The steel sleepers were also impervious to termite attack, and although initially more expensive than timber sleepers, were cheaper to lay and maintain. The bridges along the line were also designed to be submersible. This system was particularly suited to the Gulf country and was specified for the Normanton to Croydon line with Phillips engaged to supervise the construction.

Tenders were called in July 1887. The first line laid was between the Normanton railway station site and the Margaret and Jane landing at Normanton wharf to bring materials from ships to the railway station site. That section of railway line has not survived.

Some problems were encountered with constructing the line because of the difficulty of maintaining a constant and adequate supply of Phillips sleepers. They were cast at the Toowoomba Foundry at Woolloongabba in Brisbane and also in Glasgow, but to keep construction going, timber sleepers were used on some sections and timber was also used for some bridges, originally designed to be made of steel.

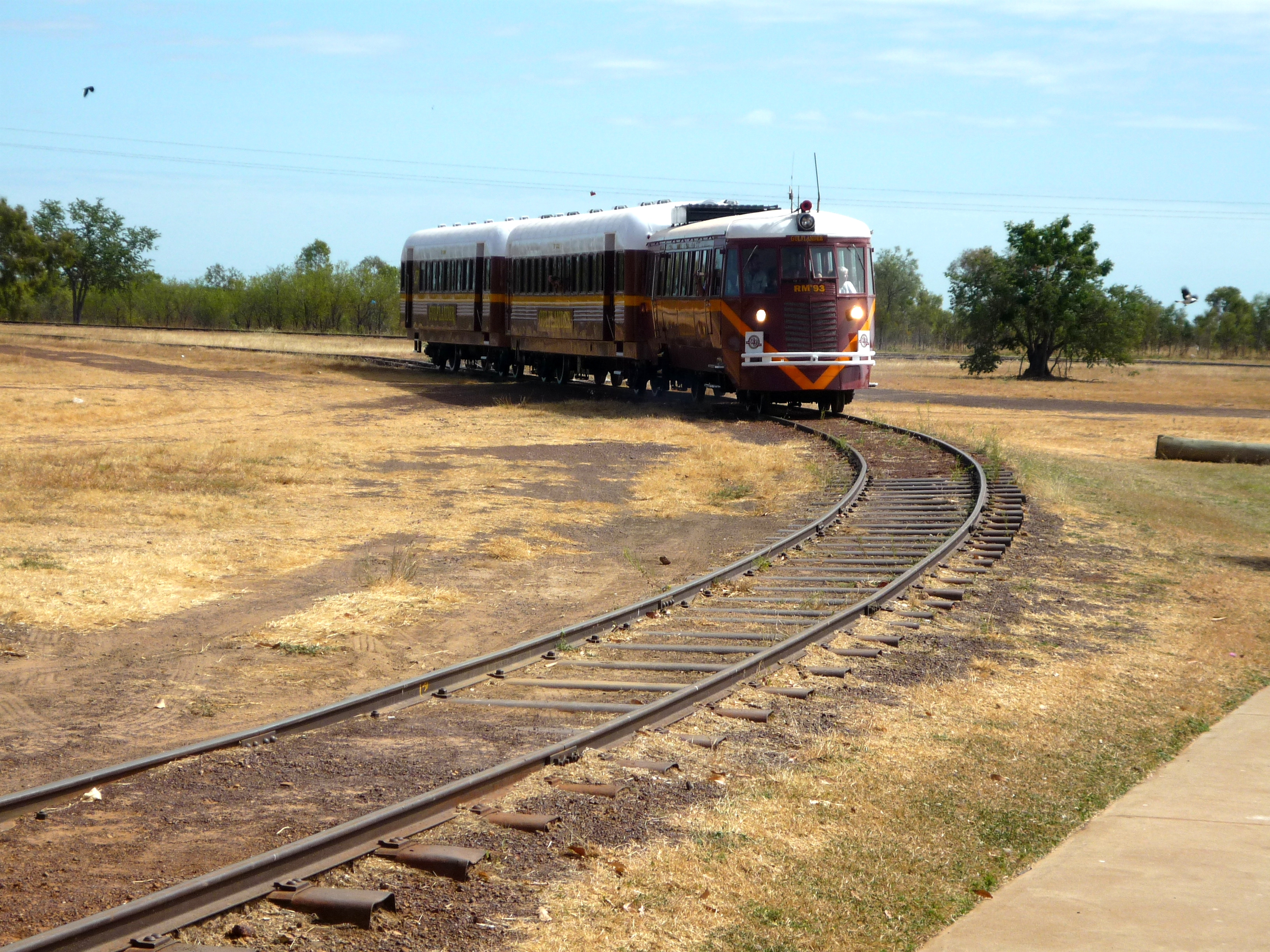
Gulflander at Normanton, travelling on the curved steel sleepers, 2011

The construction method involved clearing a three-metre wide band ahead of the rail which was stumped, ploughed, harrowed, rolled and lightly ballasted. The U-shaped sleepers were then laid on this prepared surface and the rail attached to them by special clips. The construction train then passed over them forcing the U shape down into the ground and depressing the sleepers for above half their depth. Soft spots were then packed. The finished rails were intended to be 25 to 50 millimetres (0.98 to 1.97 in) above the surface. However, in practice the sleepers became more deeply embedded with time.

The next section to be built was 61 kilometres (38 mi) from Normanton to Haydon (17°58′07″S 141°28′59″E) starting in May 1888, opening on 7 May 1889. The route for the line was finalised in 1889 and opened to Paterson's, now Blackbull (17°56′35″S 141°45′23″E) on 15 December 1890 and to Croydon railway station on 20 July 1891.

The buildings for the terminus at Normanton consisted of a station with a large arched carriage shade and a goods shed, all constructed of corrugated iron on timber frames, although the framework for the station building was used to considerable decorative effect. Because the line was isolated, a range of maintenance buildings and facilities such as machine shops, blacksmith and carpenters shops were added over the next few years. At the other end of the line, Croydon had more modest goods and locomotive sheds and a station with a roofed section over 2 tracks. In 1895, a railway water reserve was proclaimed on the flooded Bird-in-the-Bush shaft on True Blue Hill at Croydon.

Most of the timber sleepers on the line were soon replaced because of termite damage, although one section over salt pan used timber rather than metal to prevent corrosion. A number of low-level bridges form an important part of this line and were also intended to be metal. In 1900, two bridges at Glenore Crossing which had been built in timber in 1890 were replaced by low-level concrete and steel bridges. That at Glenore Crossing number 3 reused fishbelly plate girders from the original 1876 Albert Bridge in Brisbane as main spans. Original metal and concrete bridges survive and those at 80 Mile Creek and Belmore Creek at Croydon are good examples of their type.

Initially the line carried perishables, mail and passengers, and goods like building materials and merchandise. It also ferried firewood for mine boilers and batteries as the land was progressively cleared. During the late 1890s, special trains were run for picnics at most of the water holes along the line, particularly the Blackbull lagoon and weekend excursions from Normanton to Croydon or Golden Gate. The Golden Gate mine, some 4 miles (6.4 km) west of Croydon and on the railway line, was first mined in 1887. It enjoyed prosperity from about 1895 to 1901, and the Golden Gate township itself had 1500 inhabitants. A service between Croydon and Golden Gate on the weekends was introduced in 1902.

However, the goldfield at Croydon did not sustain its initial success. By the early 1900s, its output had dropped considerably and after World War I when widespread mining diminished, it was obvious that the field would not recover. The railway had only run at a profit between 1898 and 1902 and traffic, never high, steadily declined. The line stayed open as a community service and as a vital link during the wet season. This was largely because the Phillips system worked well and the track could be put back into use almost immediately after flooding, whereas roads stayed impassable for much longer. Fortunately, the track took less maintenance than standard track and in the early 1920s the number of staff was considerably reduced to reduce maintenance costs.

To cut costs, and because the supply of suitable water had always been a problem, the first railmotor, a Panhard, was introduced in 1922. By 1929, steam locomotives had been completely phased out. In the 1930s, all-weather roads (now the Gulf Developmental Road) made the railway less important, but until the late 1960s, the rail remained a vital transport link in the area. By 1974, the line was under the threat of closure, earning just $3,000 in revenue but costing approximately $64,000 to maintain.

Since then, the line has functioned largely as a tourist attraction. In 1982, a railmotor was restored and named the "Gulflander", making a weekly trip to Croydon returning the next day with a shorter special on other days. Stops are at Clarina 11 miles (18 km), Glenore 14 miles (23 km), Haydon 32 miles (51 km), East Haydon 38 miles (61 km), Blackbull 57 miles (92 km), and on to Croydon 94 miles (151 km). There is often also a photo stop at the remains of the Golden Gate mine 92 miles (148 km).

Not all of the buildings have survived; the station at Croydon being destroyed by a storm in 1969. The tank there was demolished in 1972, that at Haydon in 1980, and the blacksmiths shop and workshops in Normanton were sold and demolished in 1980. A new station building was built in 2005 similar to the original station.

While the rest of the isolated Queensland Railways lines were gradually joined in the late 19th and early 20th century, the Normanton to Croydon line remained isolated. The nearest part of the Queensland Rail network is the Etheridge line 190 kilometres (120 mi) away at Forsayth.

== Description ==
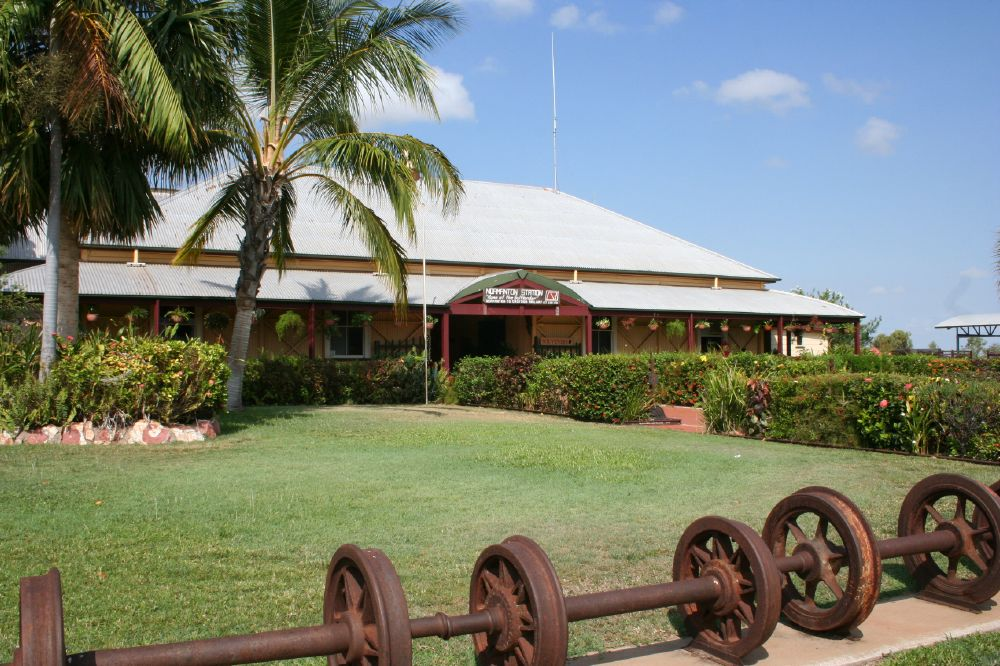
Normanton railway station, 2010

The Normanton to Croydon railway line runs 151 kilometres (94 mi) in a roughly south-east direction from Normanton to Croydon, in the Gulf Country of North-west Queensland. The line, carried for most of its length on Phillips patent steel sleepers, runs over level country and crosses a number of streams by low level bridges. It has stations at each end of the line with several stopping places in between. The buildings at Normanton railway station are located at the edge of the town on a very level site which makes the buildings stand out sharply against the skyline. The surviving buildings comprise the station building with its attached carriage shade, the goods shed, water tank, vertical boiler and some relatively modern buildings such as the Officer in Charge's house at the Landsborough Street crossing.

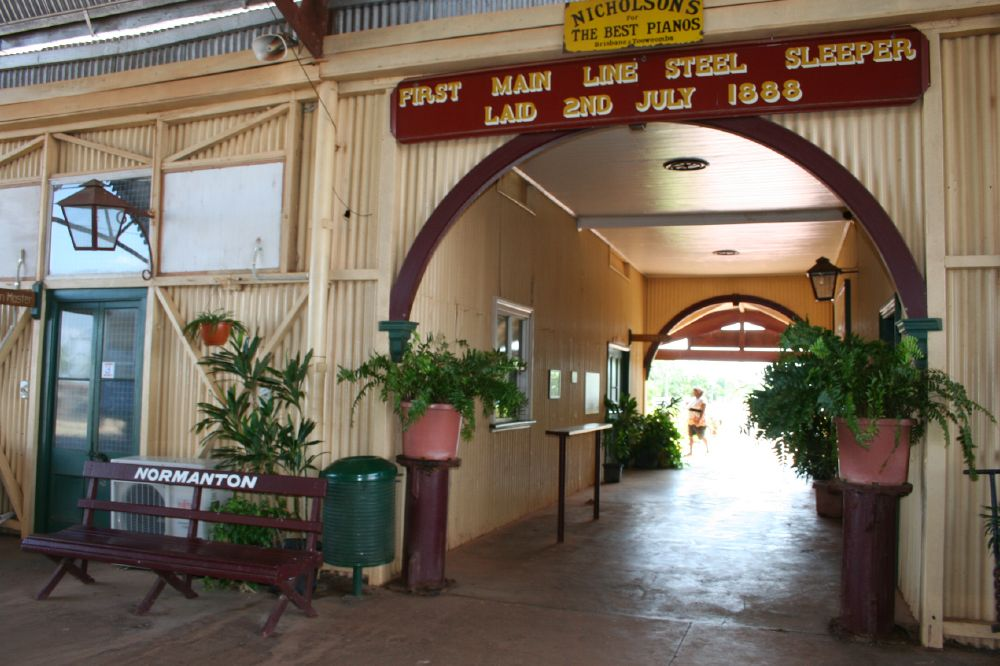
Normanton railway station entrance, 2010

The station building is rectangular in plan with offices on either side of a central passage and is constructed of corrugated iron lining a timber frame set on a slab. The pattern formed by the frame and cross braced studs has been used to create a decorative effect. The hipped roof is clad in corrugated iron, as is the roof of the verandah which stretches along the sides and front of the station, where a small gable in the verandah roof marks the entrance. From the platform side of the building arches a huge steel framed carriage shade supported with decorated cast iron columns made by the Toowoomba Foundry that supplied some of the steel sleepers. It extends over three tracks and has a continuous ridge vent. The bow string trusses are exposed at each end of the arcade and a scalloped sheet metal fringe edges the curved roof at each end of the structure.

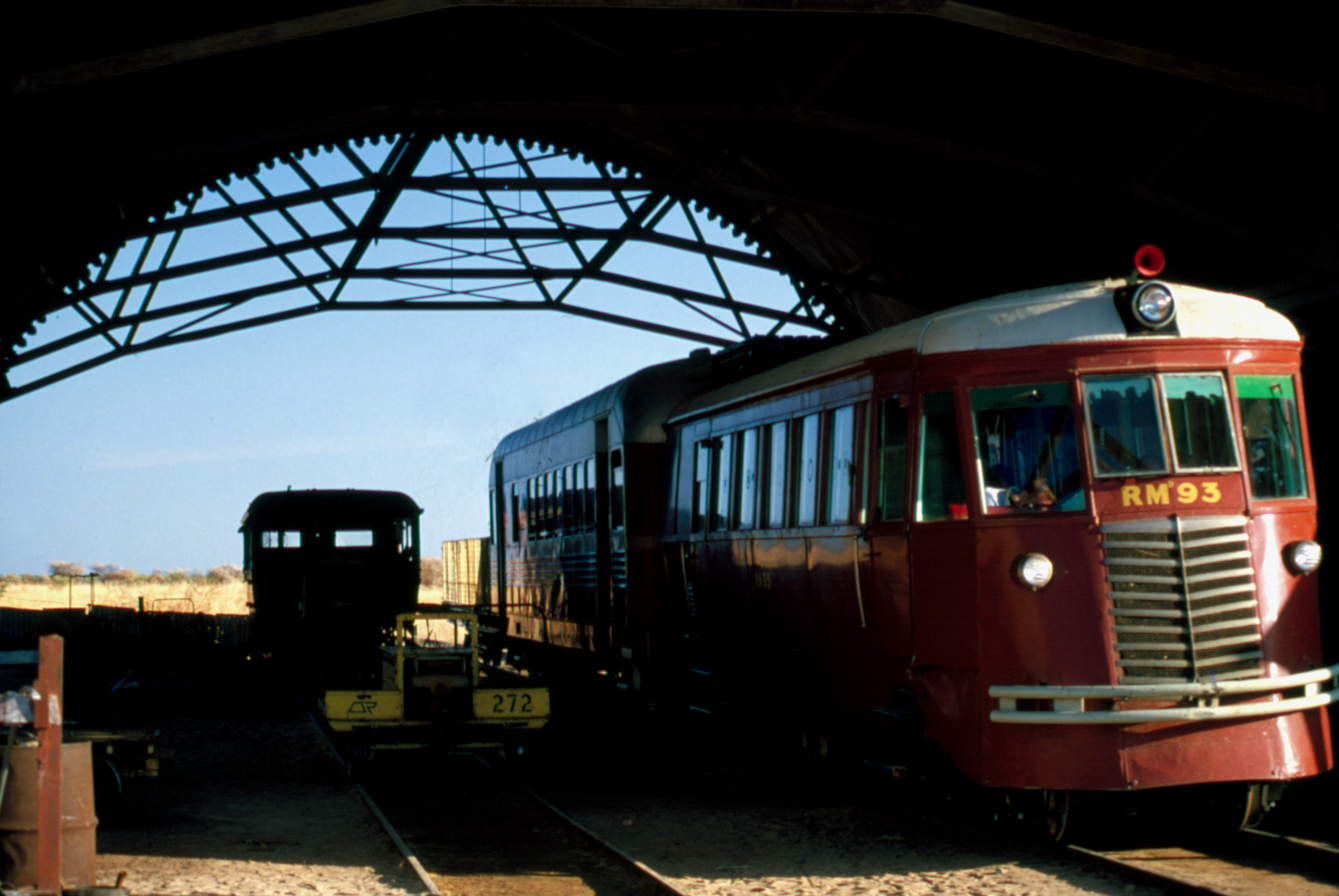
Gulflander train in the carriage shed, Normanton railway station, 1984

The goods shed faces the station across further lines and is a large building, clad and roofed with corrugated iron. The roof extends to provide awnings to the sides, one of which has been built in. It has an internal loading platform and the outside loading platform carries a 5 long tons (5.1 t) Ransomes and Rapier of London crane dating from about 1902.

The water tank is located near the site of the engine shed and is a single tier tank on a cast iron stand manufactured by Haslam and Co Ltd, of Derby. The site of the workshops consist of the footings, base walls, slabs and inspection pits. A vertical boiler by A. Overend & Co survives at the southern end of the fitting shop area. There is a modern engine shed which houses the rail motor. Also scattered through the yards are the remains of several locomotives, tenders and section of line and sleepers.

The station complex at Blackbull comprises a skillion roofed 1966 shelter shed which, although relatively modern, utilises the timber frame and corrugated iron cladding typical of buildings on this line. An interpretive centre has been established in the early 20th century railway workers' quarters. These are also skillion roofed and are corrugated iron clad with top hinged, steel clad shutters. There is an 1890 McKenzie and Holland elevated standard single tier cast iron water tank on a cast iron stand adjacent to a bore at the trackside. A mid twentieth century house recently moved to the site, modern shade structure and toilet block make up the facilities.

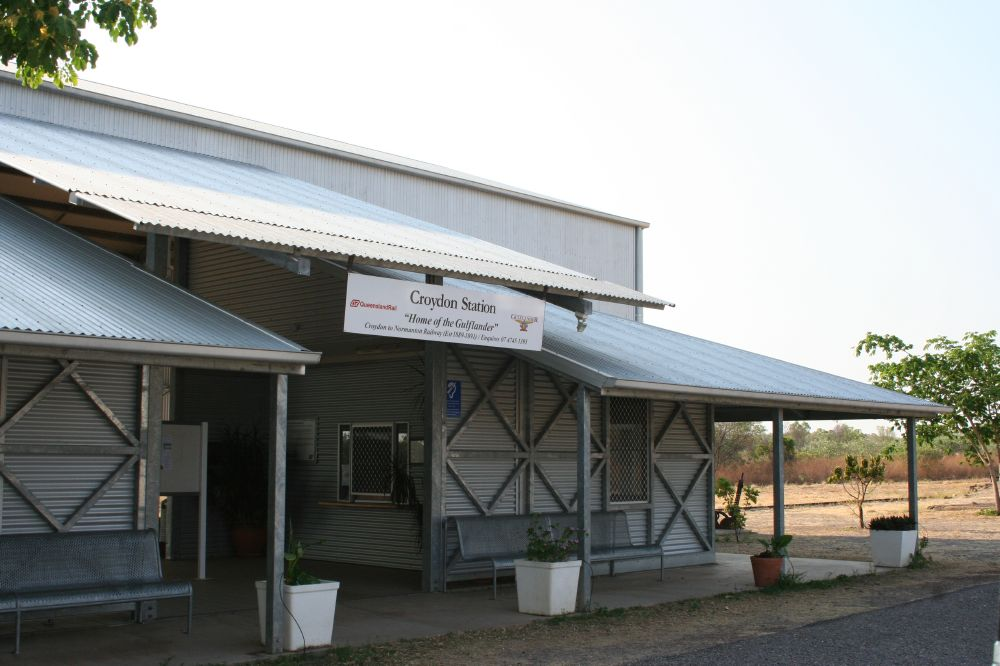
Croydon railway station, 2011

Croydon railway station is now a simple building clad in corrugated iron with a low pitched roof which does not resemble the station destroyed in 1969, but appears to have reused some of the materials. A set of Avery scales are against the outside wall at the end of the building and a cylindrical water tank is adjacent. Beyond the tank is an 1887 Saxby and Farmer lever, believed to be rare.

The complex also contains also a set of quarters similar in appearance to those at Blackbull with detached kitchen and shower annexes to the rear. Croydon station also retains some original equipment such as a Ransomes and Rapier crane, as at Normanton. This is located beside the line at a short distance from the station building and near the former goods shed, the concrete slab of which survives. A loading ramp constructed of metal sleepers and rails and filled with earth also remains, though in a ruinous condition. The tower section of a windmill made from rails is also in the yards and locomotive parts are scattered about.

== Rolling stock ==
Because of the isolated nature of the line, redundant rolling stock tended to be discarded at Normanton station rather than scrapped.

- A10 class locomotives 202, 203 and 204. 202 and 204 are on display at Croydon Information centre and 203 is stored in Croydon disassembled.
- B12 class locomotive 28. On display at Normanton Station.
- B13 class locomotives 161 and 234. On display at Normanton Station.
- Panhard-Levassor petrol railmotor RM14. On Display at Ipswich Workshops Museum.
- AEC petrol railmotor RM31, Scrapped
- AEC petrol railmotor RM32, on display at Normanton Railway Station
- AEC petrol railmotor RM60, operational at Normanton
- AEC petrol railmotor RM74 converted to diesel, on display at Redlands City Museum, Cleveland, Queensland.
- QGR Diesel railmotor RM93, Operational at Normanton
- Walkers Diesel Locomotive DL4, Operational at Normanton

== Heritage listing ==
Normanton to Croydon Railway Line was listed on the Queensland Heritage Register on 21 October 1992 having satisfied the following criteria.

The place is important in demonstrating the evolution or pattern of Queensland's history.

The Normanton to Croydon railway illustrates the way in which the rail system in Queensland developed as a series of isolated lines which connected ports to inland resources. It also demonstrates the short lived importance that goldfields, such as that at Croydon, might have.

The place demonstrates rare, uncommon or endangered aspects of Queensland's cultural heritage.

The Brisbane to Cairns railway connected all independent railways running from ports inland apart from Normanton and Cooktown, which closed in 1962. The Normanton to Croydon line is therefore the last isolated section of the Queensland Railways to remain in use. It is also the only complete line to have been constructed using the Phillips patented sleeper system, which is still in working order.

The place has potential to yield information that will contribute to an understanding of Queensland's history.

Because of its isolation, extensive workshop facilities were provided and locomotives and rolling stock were retained when obsolete. Although some have now been removed, the line retained much of its individuality and can provide information on the way in which such an isolated line was maintained and the technology used.

The place is important because of its aesthetic significance.

The buildings connected with the railway make skilful use of vernacular materials in a harsh environment The Normanton station in particular is a well executed and interesting example of late nineteenth century railway architecture in Queensland. In a flat and open landscape, its scale, form and materials make the terminus a striking and important component of the townscape of Normanton.

The place is important in demonstrating a high degree of creative or technical achievement at a particular period.

The railway line itself, with its use of low level submersible track and bridges and Phillips patented steel sleepers, was an important technical innovation designed for Queensland conditions which has lasted in use with a low level of maintenance for over a hundred years, proving its viability in these conditions.

The place has a special association with the life or work of a particular person, group or organisation of importance in Queensland's history.

The railway has strong associations with the life and work of George Phillips, who helped to explore and survey the area, served for several years as its Parliamentary representative and designed and supervised the building of the railway. It is also associated with James Gartside who prepared the designs for the Normanton terminus buildings under Phillips' direction.

== Engineering heritage ==
The railway line received an Engineering Heritage Marker from Engineers Australia as part of its Engineering Heritage Recognition Program.
