= Croydon railway station, Queensland =

Croydon railway station
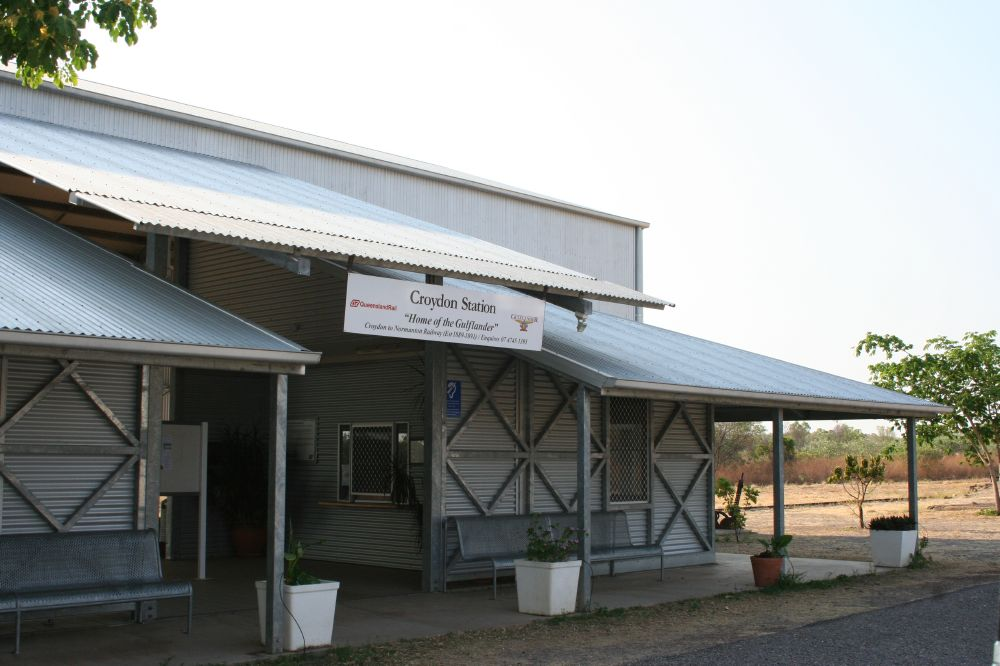
- Croydon railway station, 2011

- Location within Queensland Location within Australia
- 18.2026°S 142.2393°E
- Location: Helen Street, Croydon, Shire of Croydon, Queensland, Australia

History
- Design period: 1870s–1890s (late 19th century)
- Built: c. 1888–c. 1891

Queensland Heritage Register
- Official name: Croydon Station, Normanton to Croydon Railway
- Type: state heritage (built, landscape)
- Designated: 21 October 1992
- Reference no.: 600440
- Significant period: 1888–1960s (historical); 1880s–1890s (fabric)
- Significant components: railway station, crane / gantry, machinery/plant/equipment – transport – rail, ramp, tank – water, shed – storage

Croydon railway station is a heritage-listed railway station at Helen Street, Croydon, Shire of Croydon, Queensland, Australia. It was built from c. 1888 to c. 1891. It is on the Normanton to Croydon railway line. It was added to the Queensland Heritage Register on 21 October 1992.

== History ==
Croydon is the eastern terminus of a railway line linking it with the port of Normanton. The line was built between 1888 and 1891 when Croydon was an important goldfield and is the last isolated line of Queensland Rail still in use. It utilised an innovative system of submersible track with patent steel sleepers and retains buildings and equipment of considerable interest, both in their own right and as part of this system.

In 1867 William Landsborough investigated the Norman River area to select a port site to serve the pastoral stations south of the Gulf of Carpentaria. With him was George Phillips who shortly thereafter surveyed the chosen site of Normanton. Phillips later supervised the construction of the Normanton to Croydon Railway, and retained an interest in the area, serving in the Queensland Legislative Assembly for Carpentaria in the 1890s.

A railway line between Normanton and Cloncurry had been discussed as early as 1883 and was approved by Queensland Parliament in 1886. This was a difficult stretch for carriers and a rail link would have been valuable to pastoral stations in the area and was planned to serve the Cloncurry Copper Mine. It was at the time intended to eventually link the new line with the Great Northern Railway connecting Charters Towers and the important port of Townsville. However, in November 1885 a major gold strike was reported at Belmore Station, 145 kilometres (90 mi) east of Normanton and by the end of 1886 the population of the Croydon field was 2000 and rising rapidly in a booming town. Transportation was a major problem and access to this field became more important than the link to Cloncurry. It was decided to divert the line to Croydon.

The line was technically innovative, in response to the terrain and conditions. The country was flat but difficult for conventional railway tracks due to flooding, lack of suitable timber for sleepers and termite attack. In 1884 Phillips patented a system for taking railways across such country which utilised special U-section steel sleepers laid directly on the ground. During floods the line could be submerged without washing out the ballast and embankments normally used, so that it could quickly be put back into service when the waters subsided. The steel sleepers were also impervious to termite attack, and although initially more expensive than timber sleepers, were cheaper to lay and maintain. The bridges along the line were also designed to be submersible. This system was particularly suited to the Gulf country and was specified for the Normanton to Croydon line with Phillips engaged to supervise the construction. Tenders were called in July 1887 and the first section to Haydon (17°58′07″S 141°28′59″E) began in May 1888 and opened in May 1889, then to Patterson's (later Blackbull, 17°56′35″S 141°45′23″E) in December 1890, and finally to Croydon in July 1891.

Some problems were encountered with constructing the line because of the difficulty of maintaining a constant and adequate supply of Phillips sleepers. They were cast at the Toowoomba Foundry at Woolloongabba in Brisbane and also in Glasgow, but in order to keep construction going, timber sleepers were used on some sections and timber was also used for some bridges, originally designed to be made of steel. Much of the timber was replaced with steel at a later date.

The grandest buildings were erected at the Normanton terminus, and because the line was isolated, a range of maintenance buildings and facilities such as machine shops, blacksmith and carpenters shops were also constructed there. At the railhead, Croydon had more modest goods and locomotive sheds and a station with a roofed section over 2 tracks. In 1895, a railway water reserve was proclaimed on the flooded Bird-in-the-Bush shaft on True Blue Hill at Croydon.

Initially the line carried perishables, mail and passengers, and goods like building materials and merchandise. It also ferried firewood for mine boilers and batteries as the land was progressively cleared. During the late 1890s special trains were run for picnics at most of the water holes along the line, particularly the Blackbull lagoon and weekend excursions from Normanton to Croydon or Golden Gate. The Golden Gate mine, some 4 miles (6.4 km) west of Croydon and on the railway line, was first mined in 1887. It enjoyed prosperity from about 1895 to 1901, and the Golden Gate township itself had 1500 inhabitants. Special trains were regularly put on to serve picnic outings along the line and sports events like race days. A "suburban" service between Croydon and Golden Gate on the weekends was introduced in 1902.

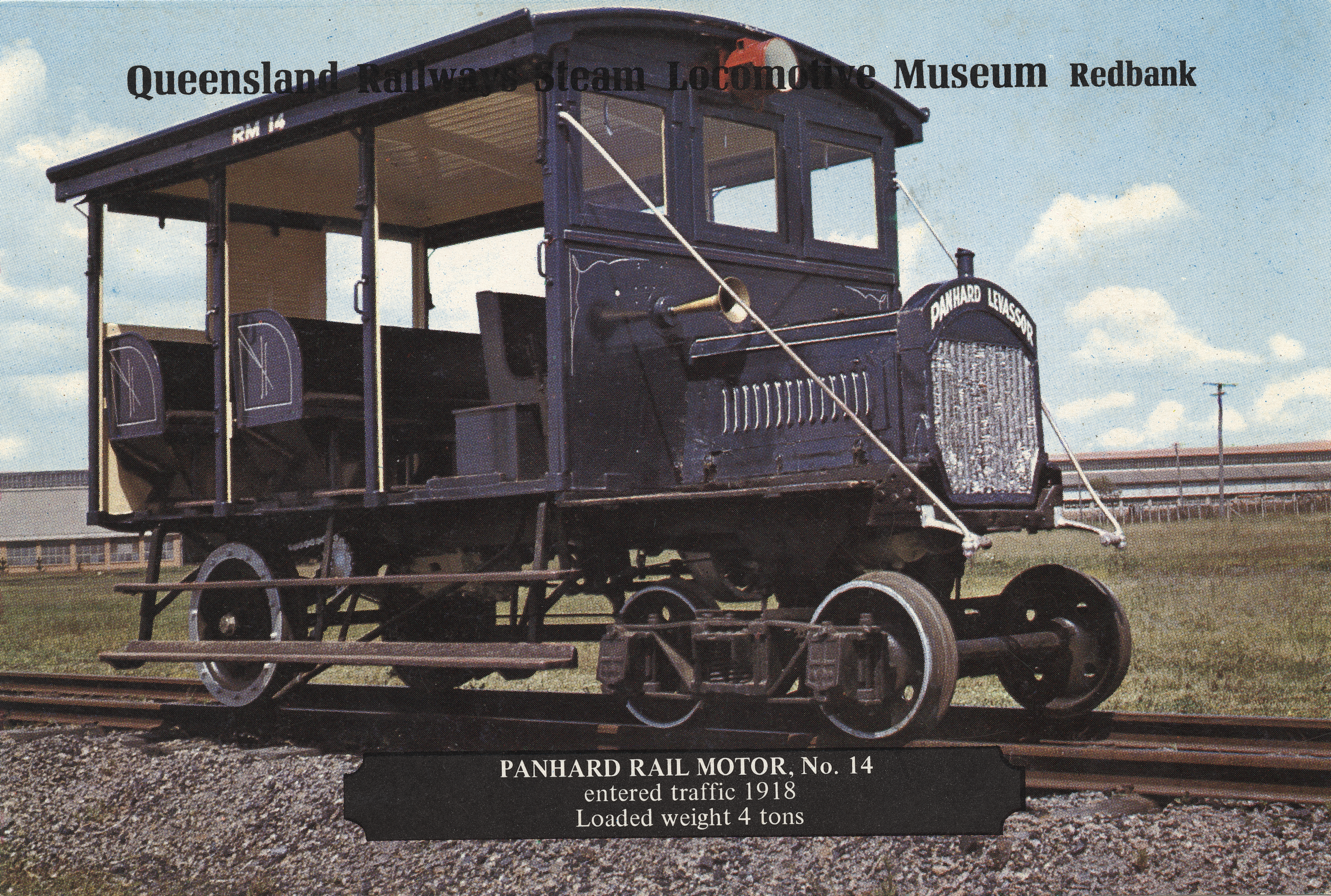
Panhard Levassor rail motor no. 14, operated on the Normanton to Croydon railway line from 1922 to 1941

However, the goldfield at Croydon did not sustain its initial success. By the early 1900s its output had dropped considerably and after World War I when widespread mining diminished, it was obvious that the field would not recover. The railway had only run at a profit between 1898 and 1902 and traffic, never high, steadily declined. The line stayed open as a community service and as a vital link during the wet season. This was largely because the Phillips system worked well and the track could be put back into use almost immediately after flooding, whereas roads stayed impassable for much longer. Fortunately, the track took less maintenance than standard track because in the early 1920s the number of staff was considerably reduced. To cut costs, and because the supply of suitable water had always been a problem, the first railmotor, a Panhard, was introduced in 1922. By 1929 steam trains had been completely phased out. In the 1930s, all weather roads made the railway less important, but until the late 1960s the rail remained a vital transport link in the area. The line now functions largely as a tourist attraction. One railmotor was restored and named the "Gulflander" in 1978 and a railmotor now makes a weekly trip hauling carriages and a flat top wagon for passengers' cars. In the wet season it also carries freight when the roads are cut.

Not all of the buildings have survived, the station at Croydon being destroyed by a storm in 1969 and rebuilt in a more modern form. The tank there was demolished in 1972.

== Description ==
The Normanton to Croydon Railway runs 94 miles (151 km) in a roughly south-east direction from Normanton to Croydon, in the Gulf country of North-west Queensland. The line, carried for most of its length on Phillips patent steel sleepers, runs over level country and crosses a number of streams by low-level bridges. It has stations at each end of the line with several stopping places in between.

Croydon station complex is located on the outskirts of town and consists of both original and modern buildings. Croydon station is now a simple building clad in corrugated iron with a low pitched roof which does not resemble the station destroyed in 1969, but appears to have reused some of the materials. A set of Avery scales are against the outside wall at the end of the building and a cylindrical water tank is adjacent. Beyond the tank is an 1887 Saxby and Farmer lever, believed to be rare.

The complex also contains also a set of quarters similar in appearance to those at Blackbull with detached kitchen and shower annexes to the rear. Croydon station also retains some original equipment such as a Ransomes and Rapier crane, as at Normanton. This is located beside the line at a short distance from the station building and near the former goods shed, the concrete slab of which survives nearby. A loading ramp constructed of metal sleepers and rail and filled with earth also remains, though in a ruinous condition. The tower section of a windmill made from rails is also in the yards and locomotive parts are scattered about.

== Heritage listing ==
The Croydon railway station on the Normanton-to-Croydon railway line was listed on the Queensland Heritage Register on 21 October 1992 having satisfied the following criteria.

The place is important in demonstrating the evolution or pattern of Queensland's history.

The Normanton to Croydon railway illustrates the way in which the rail system in Queensland developed as a series of isolated lines which connected ports to inland resources. It also demonstrates the short lived importance that goldfields, such as that at Croydon, might have.

The place demonstrates rare, uncommon or endangered aspects of Queensland's cultural heritage.

The Brisbane to Cairns railway connected all independent railways running from ports inland apart from Normanton and Cooktown, which closed in 1962. The Normanton to Croydon line is therefore the last isolated section of the Queensland Railways to remain in use and retains some rare items of equipment It is also the only full length line to have been constructed using the Phillips patented sleeper system, which is still in working order.

The place has potential to yield information that will contribute to an understanding of Queensland's history.

Because of its isolation, extensive workshop facilities were provided and locomotives and rolling stock were retained when obsolete. Although some have now been removed, the line retained much of its individuality and can provide information on the way in which such an isolated line was maintained and the technology used.

The place is important in demonstrating a high degree of creative or technical achievement at a particular period.

The railway line itself, with its use of low level submersible track and bridges and Phillips patented steel sleepers, was an important technical innovation designed for Queensland conditions which has lasted in use with a low level of maintenance for over a hundred years, proving its viability in these conditions.

The place has a special association with the life or work of a particular person, group or organisation of importance in Queensland's history.

The railway has strong associations with the life and work of George Phillips, who helped to explore and survey the area, served for several years as its Parliamentary representative and designed and supervised the building of the railway.
