= Rosewood Railway Museum =

- Established: 1984
- Coordinates: 27°36′38″S 152°33′44″E
- Type: Railway museum
- Website: https://www.rosewoodrailway.org.au/

The Rosewood Railway Museum is located near Rosewood, Queensland, Australia on the former railway to Marburg first opened in 1909. The museum utilises a station and yard located at Kunkala as its base.

== History ==
The Marburg branch opened from Rosewood in 1912 and saw primarily coal traffic for most of its life. As traffic declined the line was slowly closed in sections. Marburg to Birru was the first to close in 1964, followed by Kunkala in 1970, Cabanda in 1973 and to Perry's Knob in 1979. During the 1974 floods, the road bridge on the Rosewood-Marburg Road, which once carried traffic over the railway, collapsed onto the tracks below. The repairs to the road resulted in the removal of the railway line, permanently severing the rail connection between Cabanda and Perry's Knob

In 1984, the ARHS Queensland Division began work on returning the upper section of the line to service for the purpose of running heritage tours. The station site at Kunkala became the site of what is now the Rosewood Railway Museum.

They began running tours on both the lower and upper sections of the now split railway, opening a new station at Museum Junction in 2004.

== Rolling stock ==
Diesel Locomotives
Type	Image	Built	Notes
1179		1957	Stored
DL3		1960	Operational, named 'Mount Surprise'
1614		1963	On loan to Archer Park Rail Museum
DH38		1969	Operational

Steam Locomotives
Type	Image	Built	Notes
C17 720		1922	Stored pending overhaul, named 'Ken Biggs'
PB15 738		1926	Stored
D17 855		1938	Stored Frogs Hollow

Railmotors
Type	Image	Built	Notes
RM2033		1970	Stored Perrys Knob
RM2038		1971	Stored Perrys Knob
RM1815		1953	Stored, only remaining 1800 motor car.
RMd 55		1930	Operational, named 'Red Fred'
RM64		1938	Overhaul being completed at Ipswich Workshops
PL72		1930	Operational, used with RMd55
PL48		1928	Stored, Former Aramac Tramway rolling stock, moved to Kunkala in 1986

B. Pezet, "The Aramac Tramway Trailer Car - Aramac to Kunkula", Sunshine Express No 241, April 1986, 367-372
