= Commonwealth Railways NDH class railcar =

NDH class railcar
- Manufacturer: Gloucester Railway Carriage & Wagon Company for Commonwealth Engineering, Granville NSW
- Entered service: 1954
- Number built: 6
- Number in service: 0
- Number scrapped: 1
- Fleet numbers: NDH1-NDH6
- Capacity: 34 first class and 16 second class passengers
- Operators: Commonwealth Railways
- Lines served: Port Augusta - Maree - Alice Springs and Darwin - Birdum

Specifications
- Car length: 19.050 m (62 ft 6 in)
- Width: 2.832 m (9 ft 3 1/2 in)
- Height: 3.747 m (12 ft 3 1/2 in)
- Doors: 3
- Maximum speed: 80 km/h (50 mph)
- Weight: 36.7 tons. Axle load 9.8 tons. Fuel capacity 503.7 litres (113 gallons)
- Traction system: Tractive effort starting 10,080 lbs
- Prime mover(s): Two diesel GM 6-71. 6 cyl. inline 2 stroke. 107.95 mm (4 1/4 in) bore x 127 mm (5 in) stroke.
- Power output: 140 hp (105kw) at 1900 rpm. Wheel arrangement 1A-A1
- Transmission: Allison series 600. David Brown final drive. The final drive included pneumatic dog clutches to activate forward or reverse gear. As the dogs on either dog clutch would fail to engage at times, a rotating brake was provided on the transmission shaft. This brake was a pneumatic arrangement that rotated the transmission shaft back and forth until the dogs slid into place. Electric limit switches detected when the forward or reverse dog clutches were properly engaged.
- Braking system(s): Westinghouse air brake
- Track gauge: Narrow 1,067 mm (3 ft 6 in); Later converted to Standard 1,435 mm (4 ft 8 1/2 in)

The NDH class railcars are a class of self propelled diesel-hydraulic railcars designed by Commonwealth Engineering and built by the Gloucester Railway Carriage & Wagon Company in England for the Commonwealth Railways, Australia in 1954. They were known as Gloucester railcars.

Commonwealth Railways placed an order for six NDH railcars with Commonwealth Engineering in 1952. The NDH railcar's design had evolved from the Queensland Railways 1800 class rail motor. Queensland Railways had designed the 1800 class and Commonwealth Engineering had built them at their plant at Granville NSW, starting in 1952. At that time Commonwealth Engineering was overwhelmed with orders for rolling stock from around Australia, so it arranged for the Gloucester Railway Carriage & Wagon Company, to subcontract the construction of the NDHs.

NDH1 and NDH2 were the first two of six NDH railcars to enter service on the narrow gauge Central Australia Railway. They commenced operation on 16 December 1954 and provided a passenger service between Port Augusta and Marree. When two more of the railcars arrived from England, NDH1 and NDH2 were transferred to the North Australia Railway. NDH1 and NDH2 arrived at Larrimah after being transported by road from Alice Springs, on the 11th of July 1955.

Due to the alteration in train services following the opening to Brachina of the new standard gauge Stirling North to Marree railway in 1956, NDH railcars were used for a time on the old narrow gauge Quorn to Hawker section but passenger numbers were low, so the NDH railcars were replaced with a road bus service.

With the completion of the standard gauge Marree line from Stirling North in 1957, Commonwealth Railways found that they no longer needed the narrow gauge NDH railcars. Also in 1962 NDH1 and NDH2 were transported back from Darwin to the Central Australia Railway as Commonwealth Railways had reverted to using mixed trains to provide the passenger service on the North Australia Railway.

After eight years in service, all six NDH railcars had become redundant for narrow gauge use.

== Timetable ==
Central Australia Railway Jan. 1955. A NDH railcar would depart Port Augusta, 12.05am Mon. arriving Marree, 11.10am Mon. and one would also depart Port Augusta, 2.45pm Thur. arriving Marree, 1.50am Fri.

For the return, a NDH railcar would depart Marree, 7.45pm Tue. arriving Port Augusta, 6.58am Wed. and one would also depart Marree, 6.30pm Fri. arriving Port Augusta, 5.43am Sat. A distance of 231 miles (372 km) in approximately 11 hours.

North Australia Railway Apr. 1958. A NDH railcar would depart Darwin, 7.30pm Sun. arriving Larrimah, 6.35am Mon.

For the return, a NDH railcar would depart Larrimah, 8.30pm Mon. arriving Darwin, 8.00am Tue. A distance of 311 miles (501 km) in approximately 11 hours.

== NDH railcars become passenger cars ==
NDH1 and NDH2 were converted to standard gauge first class sitting cars and renumbered ADH1 and ADH2 in 1963.

NDH3 and NDH4 had already been converted to standard gauge first class sitting cars, ADH3 and ADH4 in 1957 and were used on the new Stirling North to Marree line. NDH3 was converted back to narrow gauge and renumbered NBDH3 in 1963. In 1965 after, another short stint on standard gauge, NDH3 became NADH3 on narrow gauge. Both times on narrow gauge it was used as a first class sitting car on The Ghan, from Marree to Alice Springs, ceasing in 1971. NDH4 was converted back to narrow gauge and renumbered NBDH4 in 1961. It then was also used as a first class sitting car on The Ghan, from Marree to Alice Springs until 1963.

In 1972 ADH2 and ADH4 (NDH2 and NDH4) had their engines removed, 415V jumper cables fitted, painted red and silver and mounted on standard gauge Westwaggon bogies for use as staff accommodation on the Thermit Welding Train.

There was a reprieve for NDH5 and NDH6, remaining as self propelled railcars though, in 1957 NDH5 and NDH6 were converted to standard gauge and were renumbered DH5 and DH6. They were then used for a standard gauge school service between Stirling North and Port Augusta. In 1971 DH5 and DH6 were converted back to narrow gauge, their numbering reverted to NDH5 and NDH6 and were transported to the North Australia Railway for a further short lived railcar passenger service between Darwin and Larimah.. The North Australia Railway ceased operation in 1976.

In the 1970s NDH1 had tanks and a pump installed in the passenger compartment and was used as a standard gauge weed spraying car ADH1. All NDH railcars had been withdrawn from service by 1977.

== Preservation ==
NDH1 renumbered as ADH1 on standard gauge was offered to the Mile End Railway Museum in 1983 but the car was never collected because it was in a very poor condition after being gutted for use as a weed spraying car. It is likely to have been scrapped in 1983.

NDH2, renumbered as ADH2 on standard gauge, was offered for sale by tender in 1979 at Whyalla and was sold to a private owner who relocated the car to Victoria. On its way to Victoria ADH2 was first stored at the BP siding at Port Pirie, then stored at Broken Hill railway station and finally stored at Albury railway station before being sent to Mittagong Engineering at Braemar, New South Wales, for a full bogie overhaul in 1985. From Braemar, ADH2 was moved to Koppers siding at South Dynon, where it was converted into a dining car and named "Duke of Gloucester".

For several years from 1987, ADH2 operated as a stationary restaurant, in the No 2 platform dock at Spencer St railway station. When construction started on the replacement of Spencer Street railway station, with the new Southern Cross railway station, ADH2 was relocated to South Dynon Locomotive Depot where it was stored. In 2013, ADH2 was transported by road to a depot near Ararat in Western Victoria, where it was stored. ADH2 (NDH2) was donated to the Pichi Richi Railway and moved to their workshops near Quorn railway station in South Australia, where it was placed on 3ft. 6in. gauge bogies, for restoration on 17 January 2025.[10][13]

Shortly after NDH3 renumbered as NADH3 on narrow gauge (formally ADH3 and NBDH3) was withdrawn, it was sold to a former heritage park, Homestead Park in Port Augusta, where it was used to house a display of historic photographs. NADH3 was then purchased by the Pichi Richi Railway and moved to their workshops near Quorn railway station for restoration, on 22 September 2014.

NDH4 (NBDH4), renumbered ADH4 on standard gauge, was offered for sale by tender in 1979 at Whyalla but wasn't sold. It was sold in 1981 to a private owner and is used for accommodation on a property near Whyalla.

NDH5 and NDH6 on narrow gauge (formally DH5 and DH6) were offered for sale in Darwin, at an unknown date. A private owner purchased NDH5 and moved it to Knuckey Lagoon, Northern Territory for accommodation on a horse property.

NDH6 was sold to a restaurant in Darwin called "The Train on Gardiner Street" and in 2005 NDH6 was acquired by the Adelaide River Railway Heritage Precinct group and is now located at their museum, Stuart Highway, Adelaide River, Northern Territory.
