= Queensland B13 Baldwin class locomotive =

Class of Australian 4-6-0 locomotive

Queensland Railways B13 class
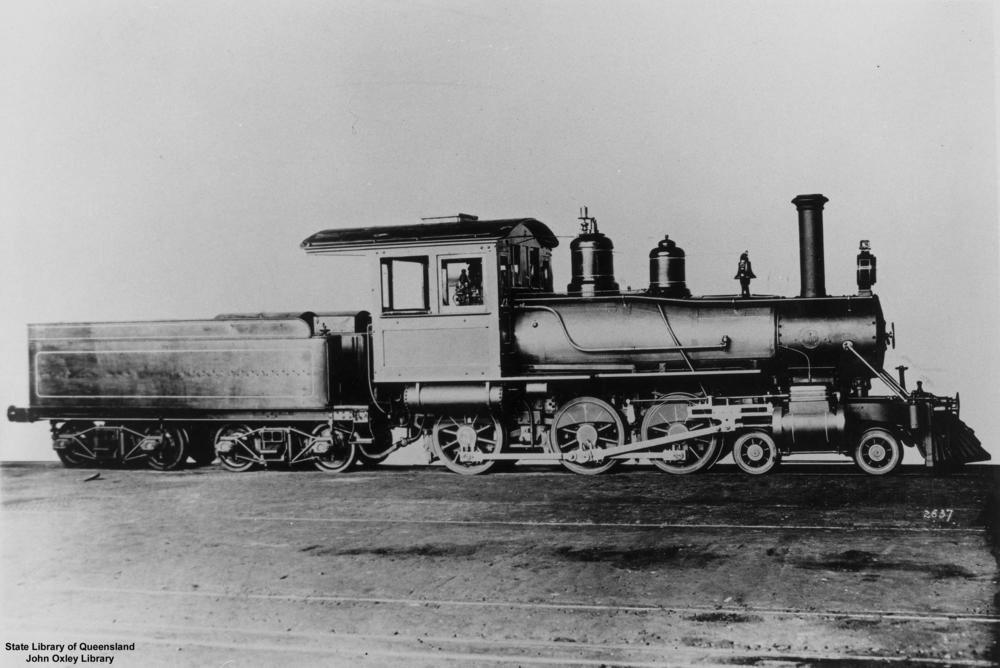
- Baldwin B13 class steam locomotive, 1892
Type and origin
- Power type: Steam
- Builder: Baldwin Locomotive Works
- Build date: 1908
- Total produced: 1
Specifications
- Configuration
  - Whyte: 4-6-0
- Gauge: 1,067 mm (3 ft 6 in)
- Fuel type: Coal
- Cylinders: 2
Career
- Operators: Cairns-Mulgrave Tramway; Queensland Railways
- Numbers: 5
- Disposition: scrapped

The Queensland Railways B13 Baldwin class locomotive was a one locomotive class of 4-6-0 steam locomotive operated by the Queensland Railways.

== History ==
In February 1908 a Baldwin Locomotive Works 4-6-0 locomotive was delivered to the Cairns-Mulgrave Tramway. It was acquired by Queensland Railways in December 1911 with the tramway and numbered 5. Per Queensland Railway's classification system it was designated the B13 class, B representing it had three driving axles, and the 13 the cylinder diameter in inches.

== See also ==
- Queensland B13 class locomotive
