= Queensland B12 class locomotive =

Class of Australian 2-6-0 locomotives

Queensland Railways B12 class
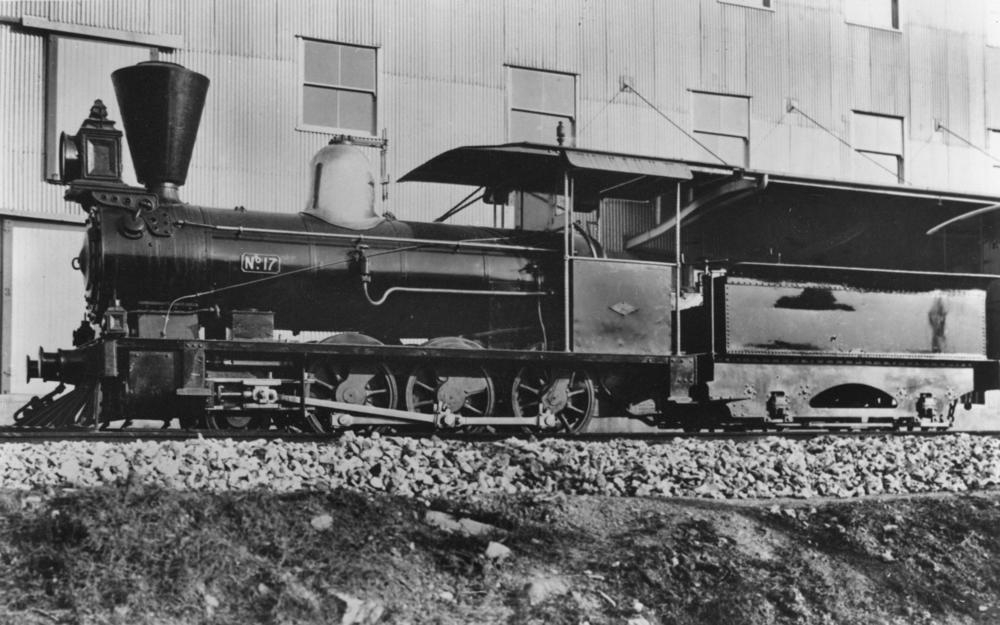
Type and origin
- Power type: Steam
- Builder: Kitson & Co (12); Avonside Engine Company (3); Dübs & Co (6); Neilson and Company (2); North Ipswich Railway Workshops (2)
- Build date: 1874-1882
- Total produced: 25
Specifications
- Configuration
  - Whyte: 2-6-0
- Gauge: 1,067 mm (3 ft 6 in)
- Driver dia.: 3 ft 3 in (991 mm)
- Fuel type: Coal
- Boiler pressure: 120 lbf/in^{2} (827 kPa)
- Cylinders: 2 outside
- Cylinder size: 12 in × 20 in (305 mm × 508 mm)
- Valve gear: Stephenson
Career
- Operators: Queensland Railways
- Disposition: 3 preserved, 22 scrapped

The Queensland Railways B12 class locomotive is a class of 2-6-0 steam locomotives operated by the Queensland Railways.

== History ==
The B12 class were built by a number of manufacturers for the Queensland Railways between 1874 and 1882. Originally classified the E class, per Queensland Railway's classification system they were redesignated the B12 class in 1890, B representing they had three driving axles, and the 12 the cylinder diameter in inches.

All were withdrawn from Queensland Railways service by July 1929 and most were scrapped, however the remains of number 28 are derelict at Normanton and components of number 40 are at Cooktown.

Number 31 was sold to the Aramac Shire Tramway in 1911 and remained in service until 1939. Although it was condemned and copper in the boiler sold for scrap, the remainder of the locomotive remained largely intact until 1963. The boiler is now privately owned and stored at Kallangur. The remainder of the locomotive and tender are still at Aramac.

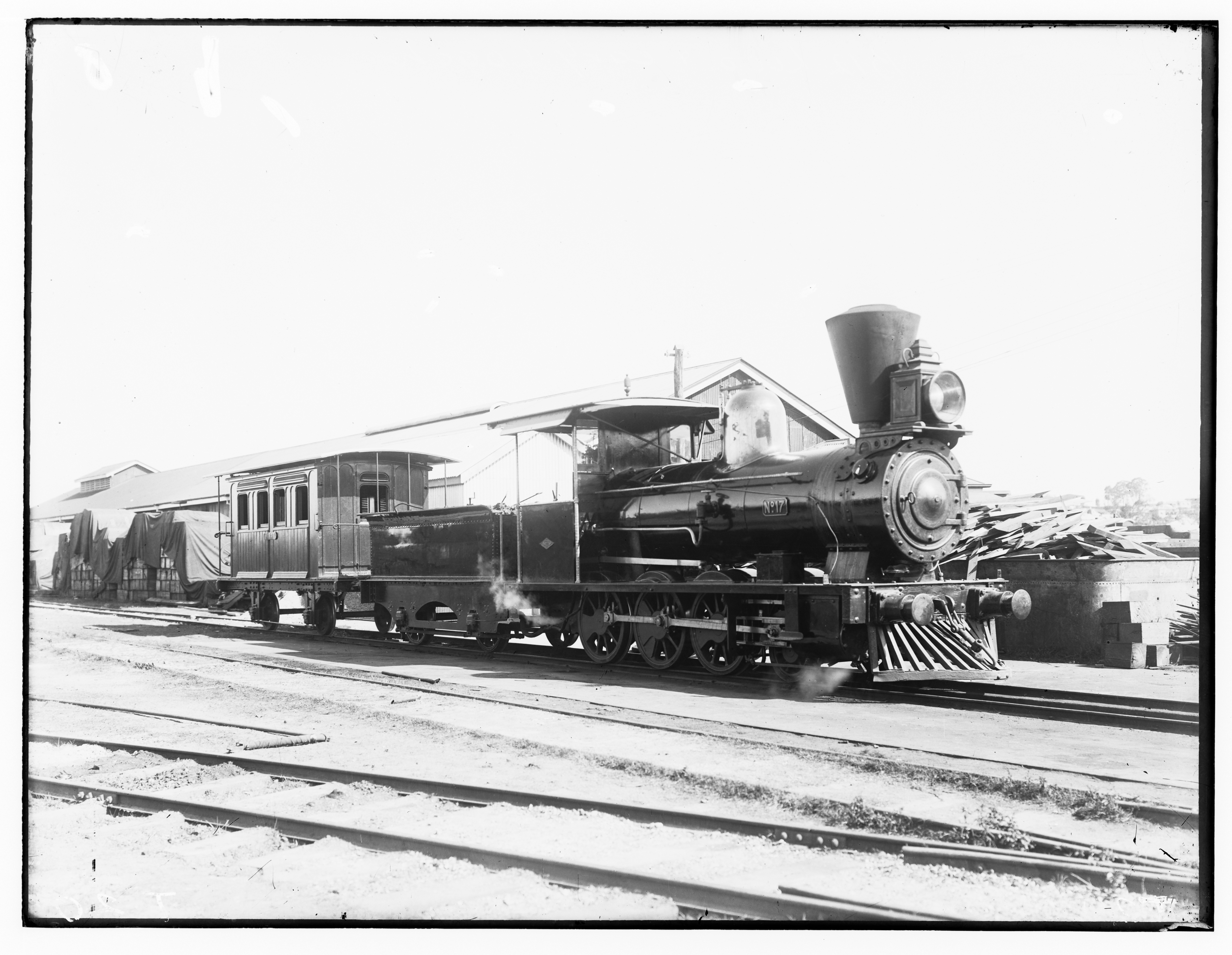
B12 locomotive with passenger carriage.jpg

== Class list ==
Builder	Works number	Southern & Western Railway number	Central Railway number	Queensland Railways number	In service	Notes
Kitson & Co	1986	23		23	July 1875	Condemned May 1915
Kitson & Co	1987	24		24	April 1875	Condemned September 1918
Kitson & Co	1988		4	136	December 1874	Sold to Cairns-Mulgrave Tramway November 1898, reacquired with tramway December 1911, condemned July 1927
Kitson & Co	1989	25		25	April 1875	Condemned May 1921
Kitson & Co	1990	26		26	July 1875	October 1922
Kitson & Co	1991	27		27	June 1875	Condemned April 1926
Kitson & Co	1992		5	137	July 1875	Sold to Cairns-Mulgrave Tramway November 1898, reacquired with tramway December 1911, condemned October 1922
Kitson & Co	1993		6	138	October 1875	Sold to Cairns-Mulgrave Tramway January 1901, reacquired with tramway December 1911, condemned July 1922
Kitson & Co	2042	28		28	October 1876	Transferred to Normanton Railway 1901, condemned February 1928. Currently derelict at Normanton.
Kitson & Co	2043	29		29	September 1876	Condemned June 1921
Kitson & Co	2044	30			30	October 1876
Kitson & Co	2045		7	139		
Avonside Engine Company	1179	31		31	November 1877	Condemned December 1911, sold to Aramac Shire Tramway. The tender, wheels and frame are currently preserved at Aramac. The boiler shells, wheels and cylinders are privately owned at Kallangur.
Avonside Engine Company	1180	32		32	November 1877	Condemned June 1921
Avonside Engine Company	1181	33		33	November 1877	Condemned June 1922
North Ipswich Railway Workshops	2	34		34	August 1878	
North Ipswich Railway Workshops	3	35		35	November 1878	Sold to Beaudesert Shire Tramway September 1902
Neilson and Company	2275		12	140	September 1878	Condemned November 1902
Neilson and Company	2276		13	141	December 1878	Condemned November 1902
Dübs & Co	1136	40		40	September 1878	Condemned February 1928. A tender and two wheel sets are preserved at the former Cooktown Rail site.
Dübs & Co	1137		14	142	February 1879	
Dübs & Co	1604	15		15	October 1882	
Dübs & Co	1605	16		16	October 1882	Condemned July 1925
Dübs & Co	1606	18		18	October 1882	Condemned July 1929
Dübs & Co	1607	17		17	March 1889	Sold to contractor Garget & Co, repurchased March 1889, condemned December 1920
