= Queensland B13 class locomotive =

Class of Australian 4-6-0 locomotives

Queensland Railways B13 class
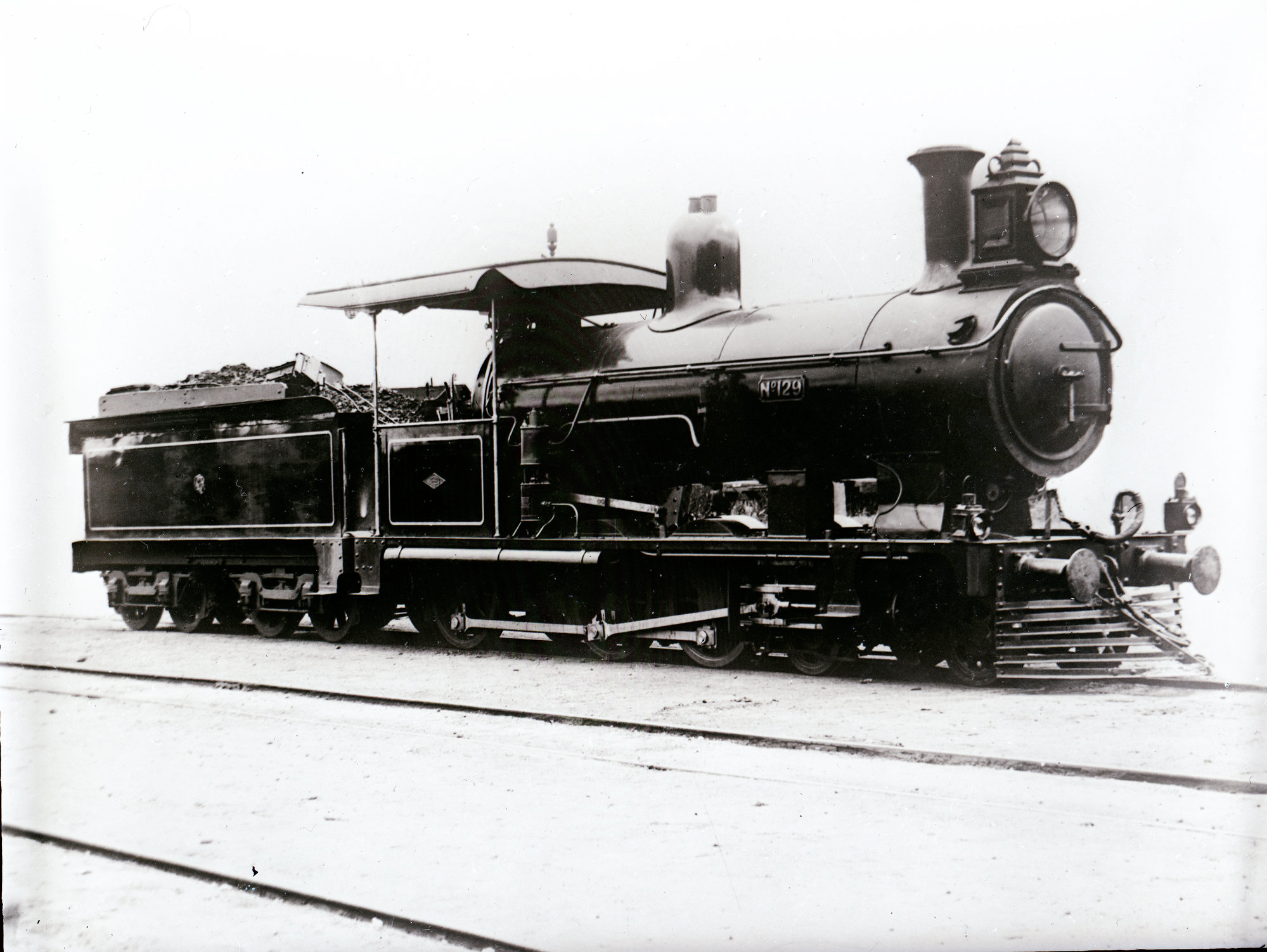
- Newly built B13 Class, no. 129
Type and origin
- Power type: Steam
- Builder: Dübs & Co (72); Kitson & Co (25); Phoenix Engine Company (15)
- Build date: 1883-1895
- Total produced: 112
Specifications
- Configuration
  - Whyte: 4-6-0
- Gauge: 1,067 mm (3 ft 6 in)
- Driver dia.: 3 ft 3 in (991 mm)
- Fuel type: Coal
- Boiler pressure: 140 lbf/in^{2} (965 kPa)
- Cylinders: 2 outside
- Cylinder size: 13 in × 20 in (330 mm × 508 mm)
- Valve gear: Stephenson
Career
- Operators: Queensland Railways
- Numbers: 44-61, 78-94, 100-102, 119-130, 145-166, 173-175, 180-201, 220-234
- Preserved: 48, 161, 234
- Disposition: 3 preserved, 109 scrapped

The Queensland Railways B13 class locomotive was a class of 4-6-0 steam locomotives operated by the Queensland Railways.

== History ==
In June 1883, the first batch of 19 were delivered by Dübs & Co for use on the then isolated section of the Queensland Railways network including the Great Northern, Central, Southern & Western and Maryborough lines. Originally classified as the F class, per Queensland Railway's classification system they were redesignated the B13 class in 1890, B representing they had three driving axles, and the 13 the cylinder diameter in inches.

Further orders were placed with Dübs & Co (52) Kitson & Co (25) and Phoenix Engine Company (15), bringing the total to 112 by 1895 by which time the isolated sections had been joined with the class operating throughout the state. In the early 1900s, most were rebuilt with higher pressure boilers and raised fireboxes. Between 1913 and 1918, six were sold to the Commonwealth Railways, entering service on the North Australia Railway as the Ng class.

The majority withdrawn from Queensland Railways religious service in the 1920s. No. 197 was sold to the Cairns-Mulgrave Tramway in 1908, only to be reacquired in 1911 when Queensland Railways took over the tramway. Two were sold to the Beaudesert Shire for use on the Beaudesert Shire Tramway, no. 52 in 1921 and 185 in 1939. Several others were sold to sugar mills. The last of the class was withdrawn in 1955. Two more continued to be used by Bingera Sugar Mill until 1969.

== Preservation ==
Three have been preserved:

- 48 at the Workshops Rail Museum (the former North Ipswich Railway Workshops)
- 161 at Normanton railway station
- 234 at Normanton station

== See also ==
- Queensland B13 Baldwin class locomotive
