= Queensland Railways DL class =

Class of Australian 150 hp diesel locomotives

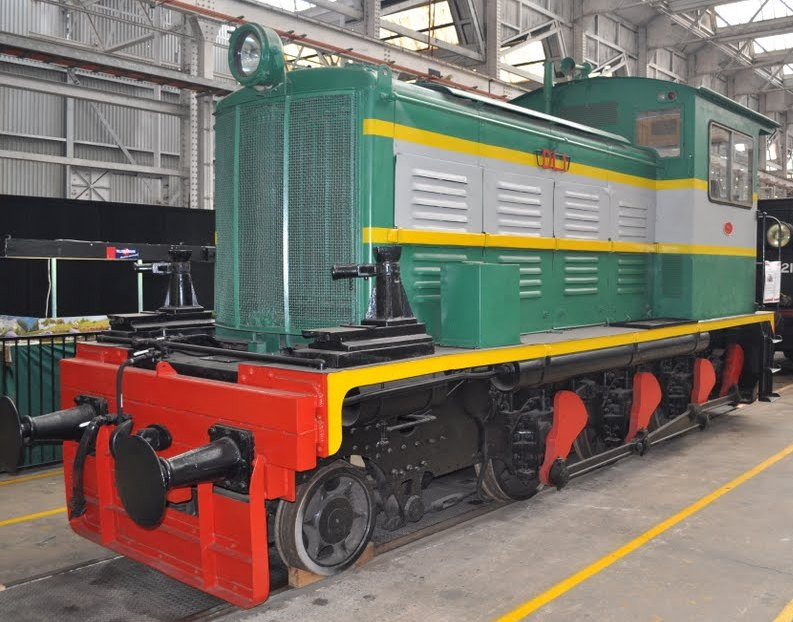
- DL1 at the Workshops Rail Museum, North Ipswich in October 2011
Type and origin
- Power type: Diesel
- Builder: Queensland Railways; Robert Stephenson and Hawthorns; Walkers Limited
- Total produced: 4
Specifications
- Gauge: 1,067 mm (3 ft 6 in)
- Length: 7.16 m (23 ft 6 in)
- Loco weight: 18 t (18 long tons; 20 short tons)
- Fuel type: Diesel
- Prime mover: Gardner 6L3
- Transmission: Wilson SCG R11A
Performance figures
- Maximum speed: 50 km/h (31 mph)
- Power output: 112 kW (150 hp)
- Tractive effort: 31 kN (7,000 lbf)
Career
- Operators: Queensland Railways
- Number in class: 4
- Numbers: DL1-DL4
- First run: 6 November 1939
- Preserved: DL1, DL2, DL3
- Current owner: Queensland Rail
- Disposition: 1 in service, 3 preserved

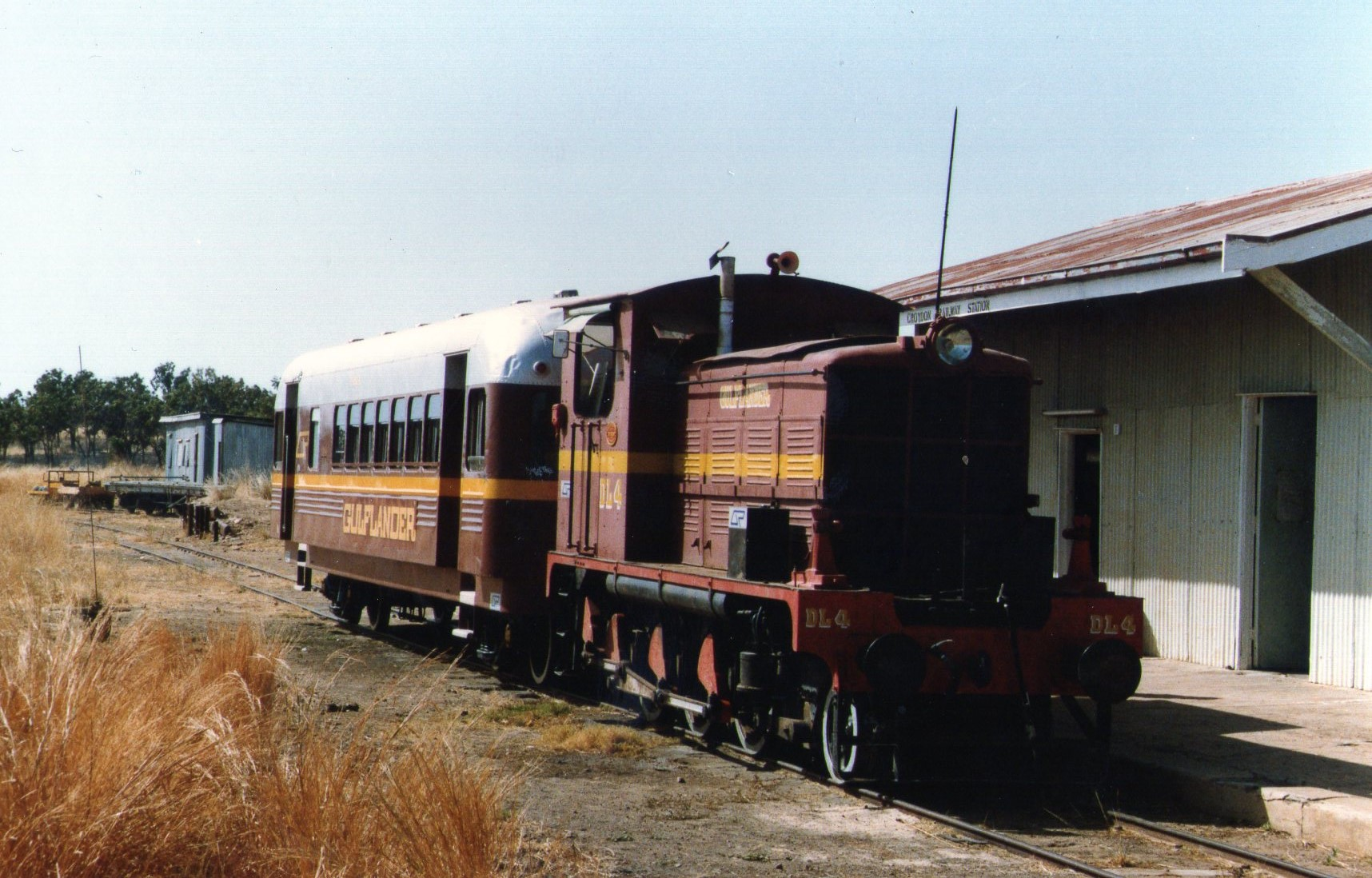
DL4 at Normanton in July 1991

The DL class is a class of diesel locomotives built by Queensland Railways, Robert Stephenson and Hawthorns and Walkers Limited for Queensland Railways between 1939 and 1961.

== History ==
The DL class provided the first diesel locomotive in service in Queensland, DL 1 being built to provide a lightweight (maximum 6-long-ton or 6.1-tonne or 6.7-short-ton axle load) locomotive for the Mt Surprise – Forsayth section of the line from Mareeba, which since cyclonic rainfall in 1927 severely damaged the line, had only been able to support a rail motor hauling 1 or 2 goods wagons. DL1 was built by Queensland Railways in 1939, initially with C wheel arrangement but after rough riding during trials around Brisbane it was returned to the workshops and fitted with a pony wheel.

DL2 was built by Robert Stephenson and Hawthorns in 1954 and the final two were built by Walkers Limited in 1961 and these locomotives were fitted with Multiple Unit capability with other members of the class. Similar equipment was fitted to DL1 and DL2 at Cairns in 1960. They were initially used exclusively west of Mt Surprise on the lightly trafficked line to Forsayth. When traffic on that line grew to the point where upgrading it to 10-long-ton or 10.2-tonne or 11.2-short-ton axle load was justified in 1968, the DL class was replaced by the 1720 class. In 1974, DL2 returned to the Mt Surprise – Forsayth line temporarily due to flood damage.

Initially the DLs were replaced by DH locos beyond Almaden. As the line was upgraded the 1720 could then go to Mt Surprise and hauled 2 DHs as vehicles to Mt Surprise from where the DHs took the train on to Forsayth and return. The 1720 lay over at Mt Surprise in the meantime. As there were two trains per week the 2 DHs waited at Mt Surprise to take out the second train to Forsayth train a couple of days later. On their return to Mt Surprise they were shut down and hauled back to Cairns. When the upgrade to Forsayth was complete the 1720s went all the way and the DHs were no longer needed. The four locos were then used as shunters at various locations down south. DL2 and DL4 sere sent to Townsville, and DL1 and DL3 to Ipswich Workshops. DL1 was sent to Wallangarra in January 1972. The open cab did not go over all that well with crews in winter.

DL 1 was modified and returned to Wallangarra in August 1972. December 1976 it became the Ipswich Workshops shunter.

All four locos were condemned in 1987, three were still operating in 1993. DL1 was retained for QR Museum at Ipswich. The latter two were modified for cold climate duty, DL1 receiving the most extensive cab modifications. DL1 and DL3 continued in use until 1987, with DL2 and DL4 being withdrawn from shunting duties at around the same time. DL4 was subsequently renovated using parts of DL2 and was sent to Normanton in 1988 as a backup locomotive for the Gulflander on the Normanton to Croydon line, a role it still fulfils to this day, while DL2 was donated to the township of Forsayth for plinting undercover in a park. DL1 was retained by QR as part of its historical collection, while DL3 was preserved by the ARHS for use at the Rosewood Railway Museum.

Three of the class were withdrawn in 1988–1989 and have been preserved. DL4 remains in service with Queensland Rail as a backup locomotive for the Gulflander on the Normanton to Croydon line.

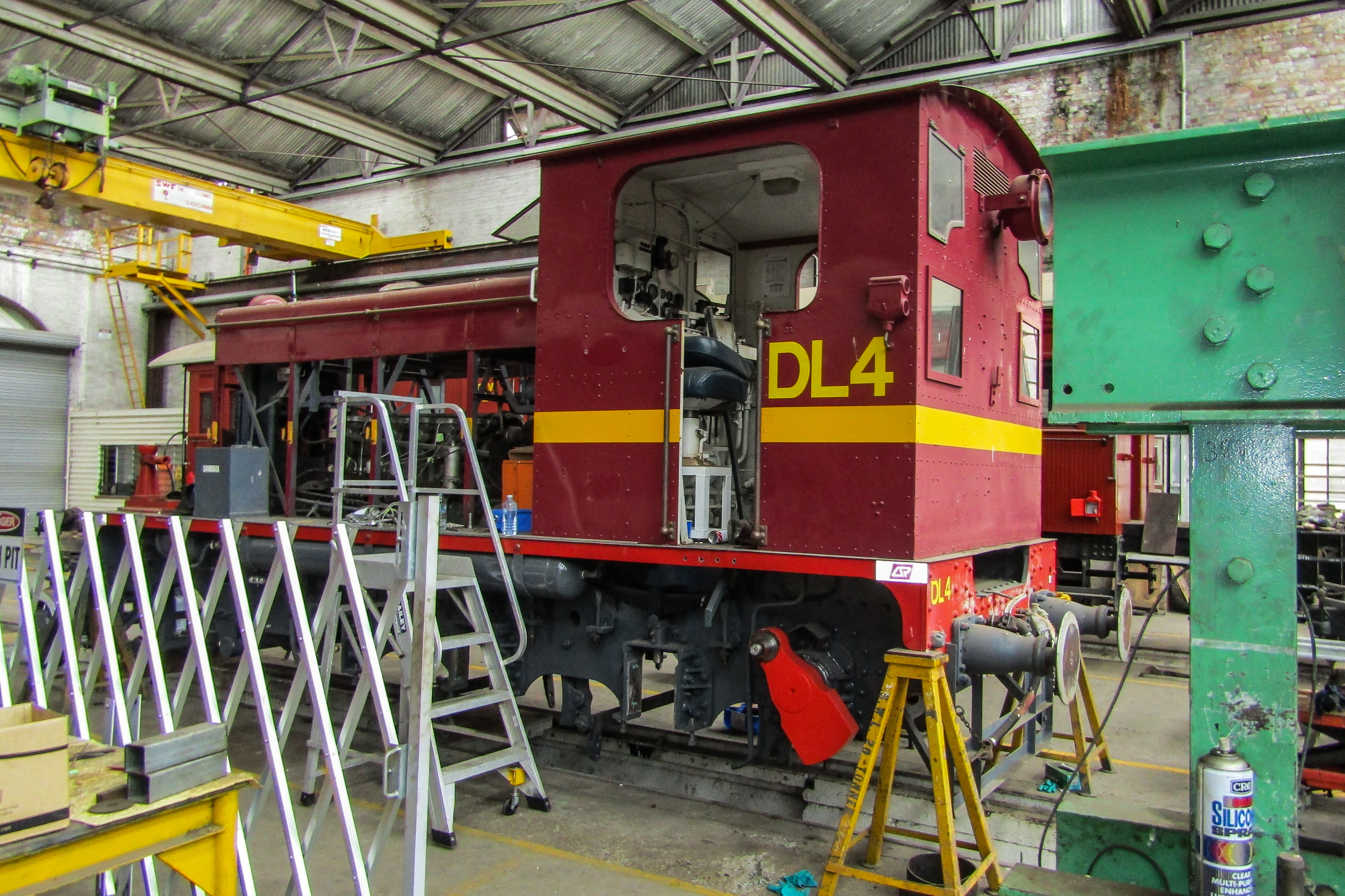
DL4 being serviced at Ipswich in October 2019

The DL class were mostly maintained at Cairns, but occasionally made trips to Ipswich Workshops for heavy overhaul, a practice that is still carried out by DL4 to this day. They were trailed on goods trains as part of the long distance transfers.

DL2 and DL4 were used for shunting in the Townsville North yard and at Ayr, and often rotated between these locations.

DL3 was sent from Ipswich Workshops to Wallangarra for shunting in 1972 but returned after 7 months as it was unsuitable for the cold climate. As a result, DL1 was modified with an enclosed cab, heaters, a shunters refuge on the rear of the cab etc. and subsequently worked there from August 1972 to December 1976. DL3 was fitted with and enclosed cab (to a different design) at Ipswich in July 1975.

In 1999, the DL4 was overhauled at the Redbank workshops and returned to Normanton in 2000. Since then, it has performed essential shunting activities in Normanton and Croydon yards and has railed maintenance materials for the local track gang.

In late 2019, DL4 received an overhaul with its wheelsets and motion refurbished, overhauled compressor, new pony axle, new wheel bearings all round, re-machined tyres, re-machined crankpins and new crankpin bushes. All the work that cannot be serviced in Normanton. It returned to Normanton in December and did a test run. Some adjustments were made by the local Normanton crew on the suspension to correct some binding in the driver's side jackshaft crankpin.

== Status table ==
| Number | Name | Builder | Serial number | In service | Withdrawn | Notes |
|---|---|---|---|---|---|---|
| DL1 | Etheridge | Queensland Railways | | 6 November 1939 | 13 February 1989 | Preserved, Queensland Rail Heritage Division, on display at Workshops Rail Museum, North Ipswich |
| DL2 | Forsayth | Robert Stephenson and Hawthorns | 7747/2481 | 14 May 1954 | 15 May 1989 | Static display at Forsayth |
| DL3 | Mt Surprise | Walkers Limited | 571 | 23 June 1961 | 18 January 1988 | Preserved operational, Australian Railway Historical Society, Rosewood Railway Museum |
| DL4 | Almaden | Walkers Limited | 572 | 30 June 1961 | | Operational with Queensland Rail |
