= Queensland Railways 1800 class rail motor =

Queensland Railways 1800 class railmotor
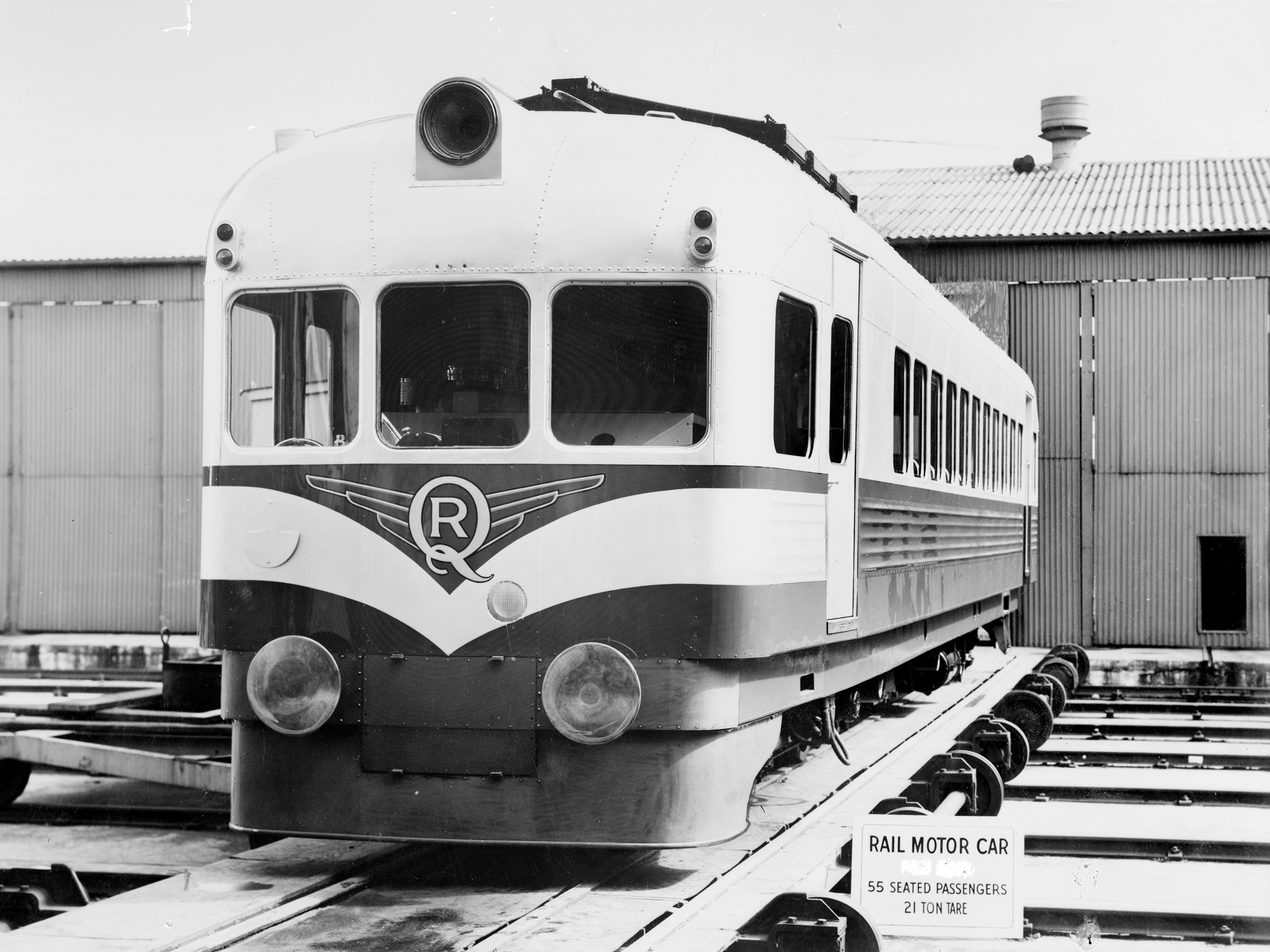
- A new 1800 Class railmotor on the traverser at Commonwealth Engineering Granville NSW 1952.
- Manufacturer: Commonwealth Engineering
- Built at: Granville
- Constructed: 1952–1954
- Number built: 24 (12 railmotors and 12 trailer passenger)
- Number in service: 2 (one railmotor, converted to a trailer passenger and one trailer passenger)
- Number preserved: 5 (one complete railmotor, three privately owned railmotor bodies without bogies and one privately owned trailer passenger without bogies)
- Number scrapped: 17 (7 railmotors and 10 trailer passenger)
- Diagram: M1800 P47 Queensland Railways Mechanical Engineers Branch Ipswich Qld. drawn 26/11/1952
- Fleet numbers: Rail motors 1800 1803 1804 1807 1808 1811 1812 1815 1816 1819 1820 1823 Trailer passenger 1801 1802 1805 1806 1809 1810 1813 1814 1817 1818 1821 1822
- Capacity: 55 passengers
- Operators: Queensland Railways

Specifications
- Car length: 14.885 mtrs (48 ft 10 1/4 inches)
- Width: 2.83 mtrs (9 ft 3 3/8 inches)
- Height: 3.763 mtrs (12 ft 4 1/16 inches)
- Floor height: 1.041 mtrs (3 ft 5 inches)
- Doors: Railmotor, 4 side doors plus 1 rear end door. Trailer passenger. 4 side doors plus 2 end doors, one at each end.
- Wheel diameter: Front power bogie 762 mm (2 ft 6 inches). Rear bogie 838 mm (2 ft 9 inches)
- Weight: 23.217 tonnes (22 tons 17 cwt)
- Prime mover(s): Single Gardner 6L3 diesel
- Power output: 114 kW (153 hp)
- Transmission: Hydraulic Coupling Wilson Epicyclic Type 5.8. 4 speed electro pnematic self selecting 4 speed gearbox.
- Bogies: Front: Drewry Power Bogie. Rear: Ride Control A.3. bogie.
- Coupling system: Double buffer and chain link.
- Track gauge: 1,067 mm (3 ft 6 in)

The 1800 class railmotors were a class of self-propelled diesel railmotors built by Commonwealth Engineering, Granville for the Queensland Railways.

== History ==
In 1949, the Queensland Railways placed an order for 12 aluminium two-carriage 1800 class railmotors with Commonwealth Engineering, Granville. Each set comprised a power car (RM – "Rail Motor") and trailer car (TP – "Trailer Passenger"). The railmotors seated 55 passengers and were delivered to Queensland Railways between 1952 and 1954.

These trains were used on most Brisbane's suburban lines as well as country lines, especially in North Queensland. On suburban lines, they usually ran with two diesel powered railmotors at each end and one or more non powered trailer cars between the two. However, the 1800 class were not popular with passengers as they featured uncomfortable seating, poor riding qualities and inadequate ventilation for Queensland's humid subtropical climate.

== Preservation ==
Two trailer carriages, one of which is converted from a railmotor, remain in service on the Gulflander, operating between Normanton and Croydon, and one complete railmotor is preserved at the Rosewood Railway Museum. Three railmotor bodies without bogies and one trailer passenger body also without bogies are privately owned.

== Gallery ==
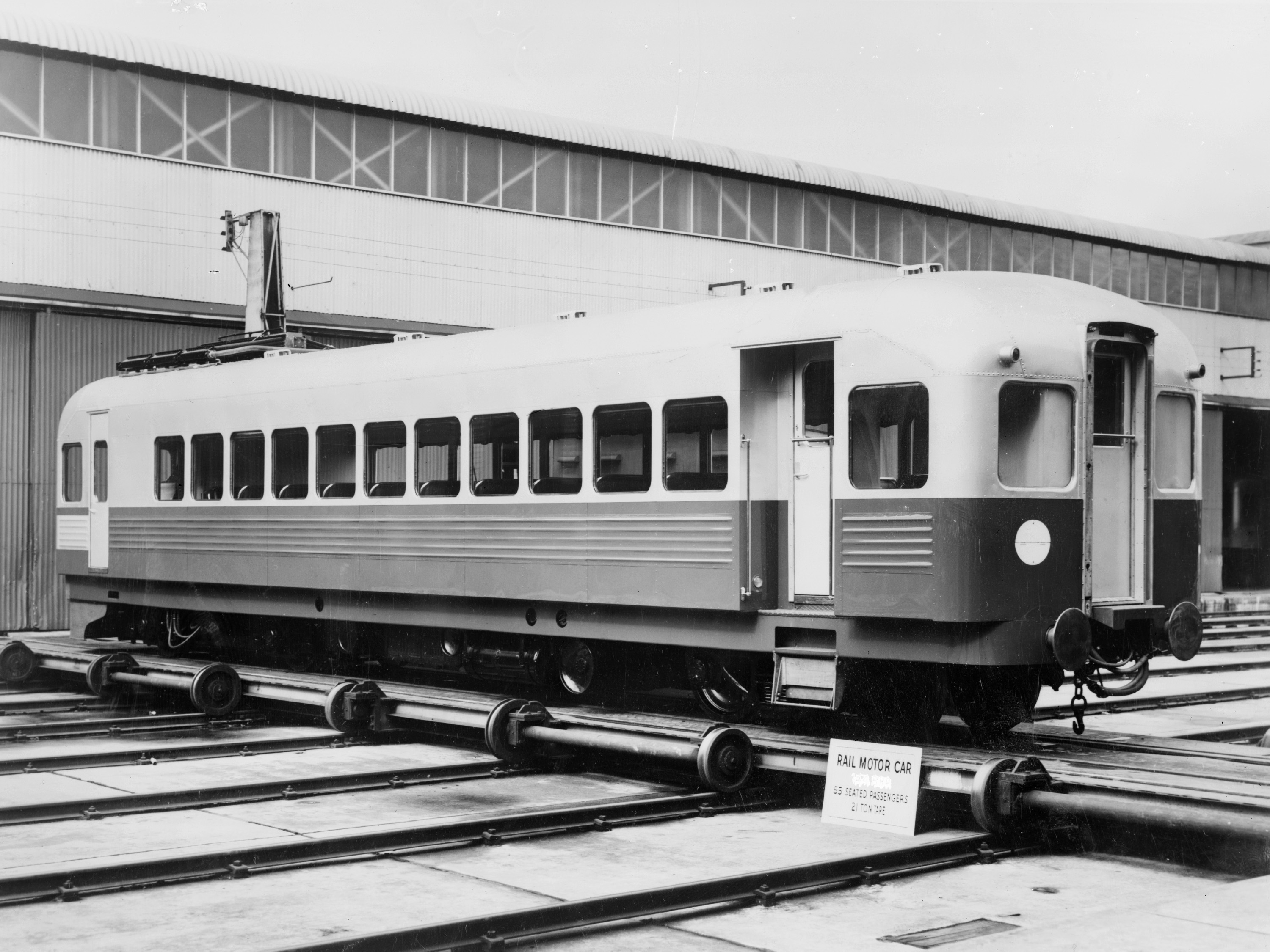
New 1800 Class Railmotor at Commonwealth Engineering Granville NSW 1952.

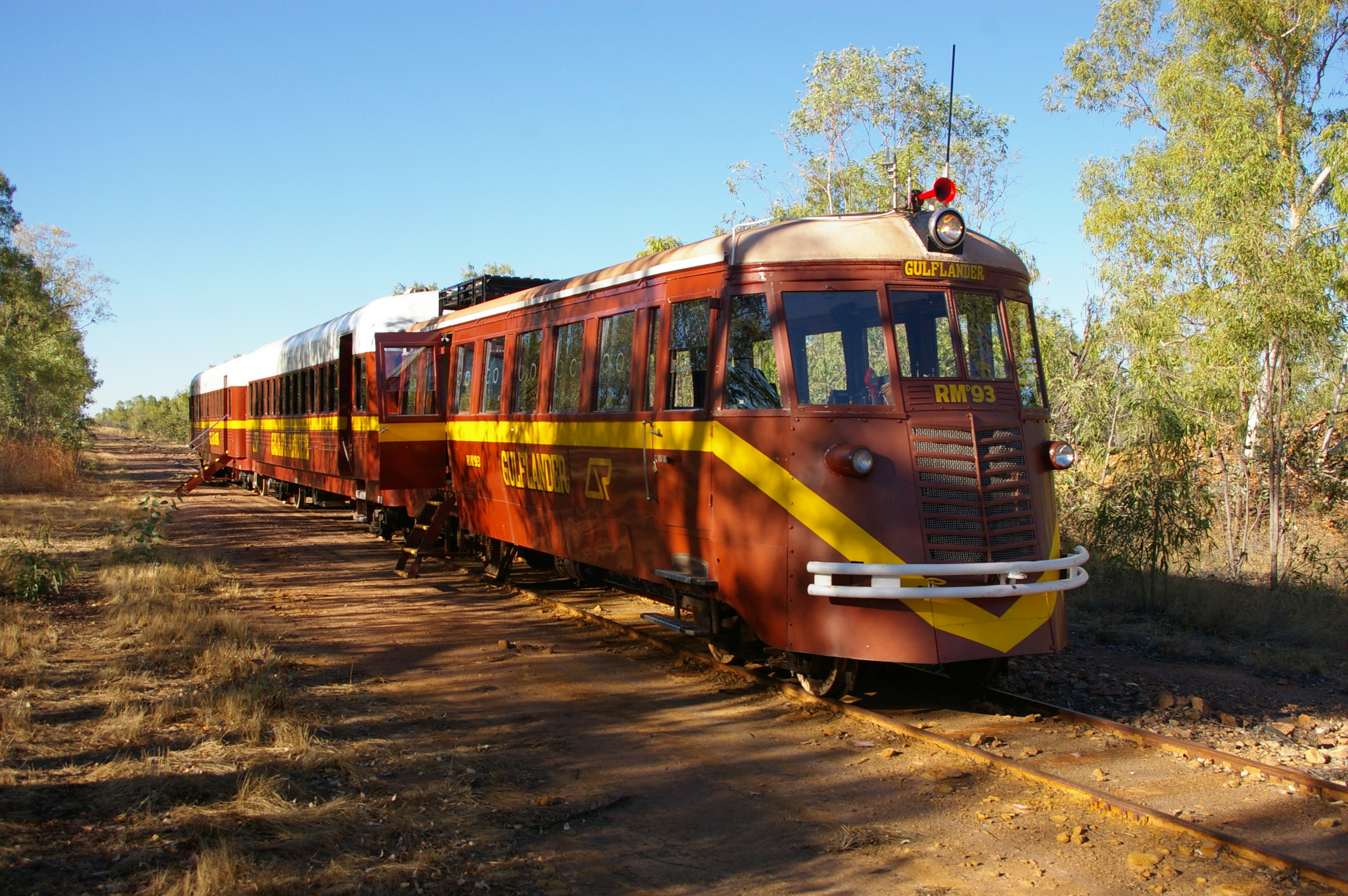
1800 Class railmotor trailer cars 1809 and 1811 behind RM93 on the Gulflander

== Summary ==
Number	In service	Withdrawn	Scrapped	Notes
RM1800	23 November 1952	16 January 1979	October 1985	
TP1801	23 November 1952			
TP1802	23 November 1952			
RM1803	23 November 1952	15 February 1979		Body privately owned at Wondai.
RM1804	28 January 1953	23 February 1980		Body privately owned near Dalby.
TP1805	28 January 1953			
TP1806	28 January 1953			
RM1807	28 January 1953	19 July 1975	July 1976	
RM1808	29 March 1953	15 February 1969	March 1972	
TP1809	29 March 1953			In use as a trailer on the Gulflander since 1980.
TP1810	29 March 1953	15 February 1969	March 1972	
RM1811	29 March 1953			Used as the QR Commissioners Car in the 1980s. Demotored in 1991, reclassified TP1811 for use as a trailer on the Gulflander.
RM1812	26 June 1953	20 November 1978		Body privately owned near Gympie.
TP1813	26 June 1953			Body privately owned near Ebenezer.
TP1814	26 June 1953			
RM1815	26 June 1953	10 October 1978		Preserved at the Rosewood Railway Museum.
RM1816	20 September 1953	15 November 1976	October 1985	
TP1817	20 September 1953			
TP1818	20 September 1953			
RM1819	20 September 1953	18 February 1979	October 1985	
RM1820	30 June 1954	14 November 1974	June 1979	
TP1821	30 June 1954			
TP1822	30 June 1954			
RM1823	30 June 1954	13 March 1972	October 1985	
