= Normanton railway station, Queensland =

Normanton railway station
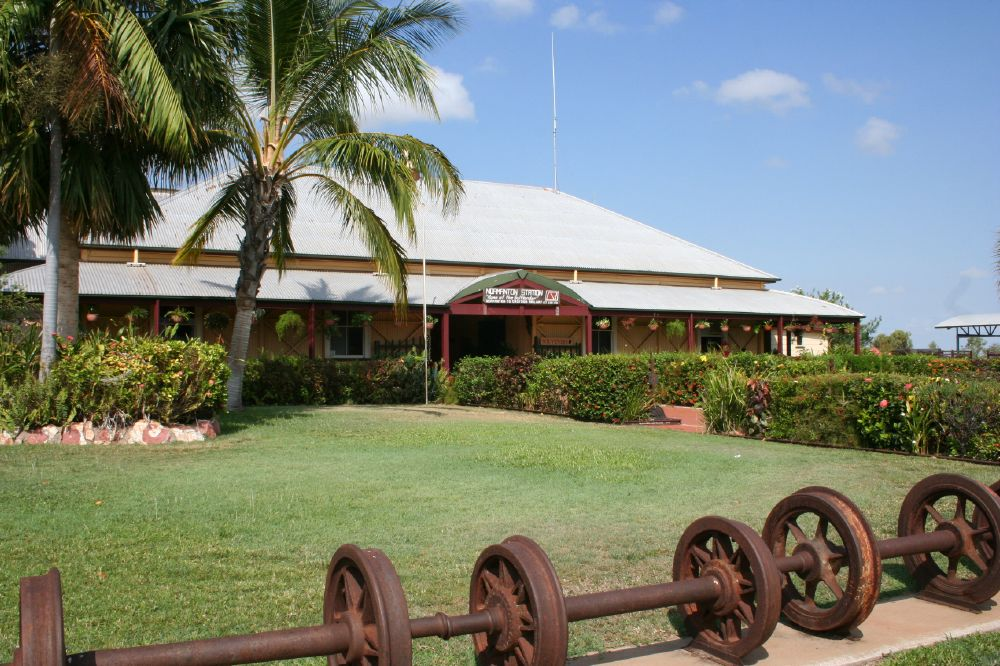
- Normanton railway station, 2010

- Location within Queensland Location within Australia
- 17.6729°S 141.0715°E
- Location: Matilda Street, Normanton, Shire of Carpentaria, Queensland, Australia

History
- Design period: 1870s–1890s (late 19th century)
- Built: 1889

Queensland Heritage Register
- Official name: Normanton Railway Terminus
- Type: state heritage (landscape, built)
- Designated: 21 October 1992
- Reference no.: 600395
- Significant period: 1889–1960s (historical)
- Significant components: platform, views to, shed/s, views from, shed – goods, crane / gantry, tank – water, carriage shade (railway), railway station, machinery/plant/equipment – transport – rail

Normanton railway station is a heritage-listed railway station at Matilda Street, Normanton, Shire of Carpentaria, Queensland, Australia. It was built in 1889. It was added to the Queensland Heritage Register on 21 October 1992. It serves as a tourist attraction and station for the Gulflander line.

== History ==
The railway complex at Normanton consists of the major buildings of an important inland railway terminus of the Normanton to Croydon railway line connecting the port of Normanton with the goldfield at Croydon.

A railway line between Normanton and Cloncurry had been discussed as early as 1883 and was approved by Queensland Parliament in 1886. This was a difficult stretch for carriers and a rail link would have been valuable to pastoral stations in the area and would also have served the Cloncurry Copper Mine. It was at the time intended to eventually link the new line with the Great Northern Railway connecting Charters Towers and the important port of Townsville. However, in November 1885 a major gold strike was reported at Belmore Station, 145 kilometres (90 mi) east of Normanton and by the end of 1886 the population of the Croydon field was 2000 and 6000 in the following year. Transportation was a major problem and access to this field became more important than the link to Cloncurry. It was decided to divert the line to Croydon. Tenders were called in July 1887 and the first section to Haydon began in May 1888. The work was designed and supervised by George Phillips and this section opened on 7 May 1889. The current route of the line was finalised in 1889 and reached Croydon on 7 July 1891, opening on the 20 July.

In 1867 Phillips had taken part in the exploration of the country around Normanton with William Landsborough, working for him a surveyor. Soon afterwards, he surveyed the area chosen as a port to become the town of Normanton. The country was difficult for conventional railway tracks due to flooding, lack of suitable timber and voracious termites. In 1884 Phillips patented a system for taking railways across such country which utilised special U section steel sleepers laid directly on the ground. During floods the line could be submerged without washing out the ballast and embankments normally used, so that it could quickly be put back into service when the waters subsided. The steel sleepers were also impervious to termite attack, and although initially more expensive than timber sleepers, were cheaper to lay and maintain. It was this system that was specified for the Normanton to Croydon line and Phillips was engaged to supervise the construction. After the railway was completed he maintained an interest in the area, serving as Member of the Queensland Legislative Assembly for Carpentaria, inspecting artesian bores and writing a report on ports and railways in 1909.

The station building and carriage shade were designed under Phillips direction by James Gartside, a draftsman for the department. and were built about 1889. The line was opened in 1891. At its peak, the complex at Normanton consisted of a station building containing a telegraph office, station master's and traffic manager's offices, clerks' room, waiting room, parcels and cloak room, booking office, and a ladies' room with a ramp to ladies-only earth closets. Attached to the station building, and sheltering the platform and three tracks, was an arcaded carriage shade with a curved roof .

The terminus also had a large goods shed with a crane and because the line was isolated, a workshop area comprising a maintenance store, suspense stores, a timber shed, tanks, locomotive store, fitting shop, carpenter's and blacksmith's shops, timber shed, gantry and engine shed.. There was also a horse and carriage dock, porters' and lamp rooms, closets, and a tool house nearby. Residences for the station master, enginemen and guard were located south-east of Landsborough St. The traffic manager's house and stables adjoined where the wharf line departed for the Margaret and Jane landing on the Norman River.

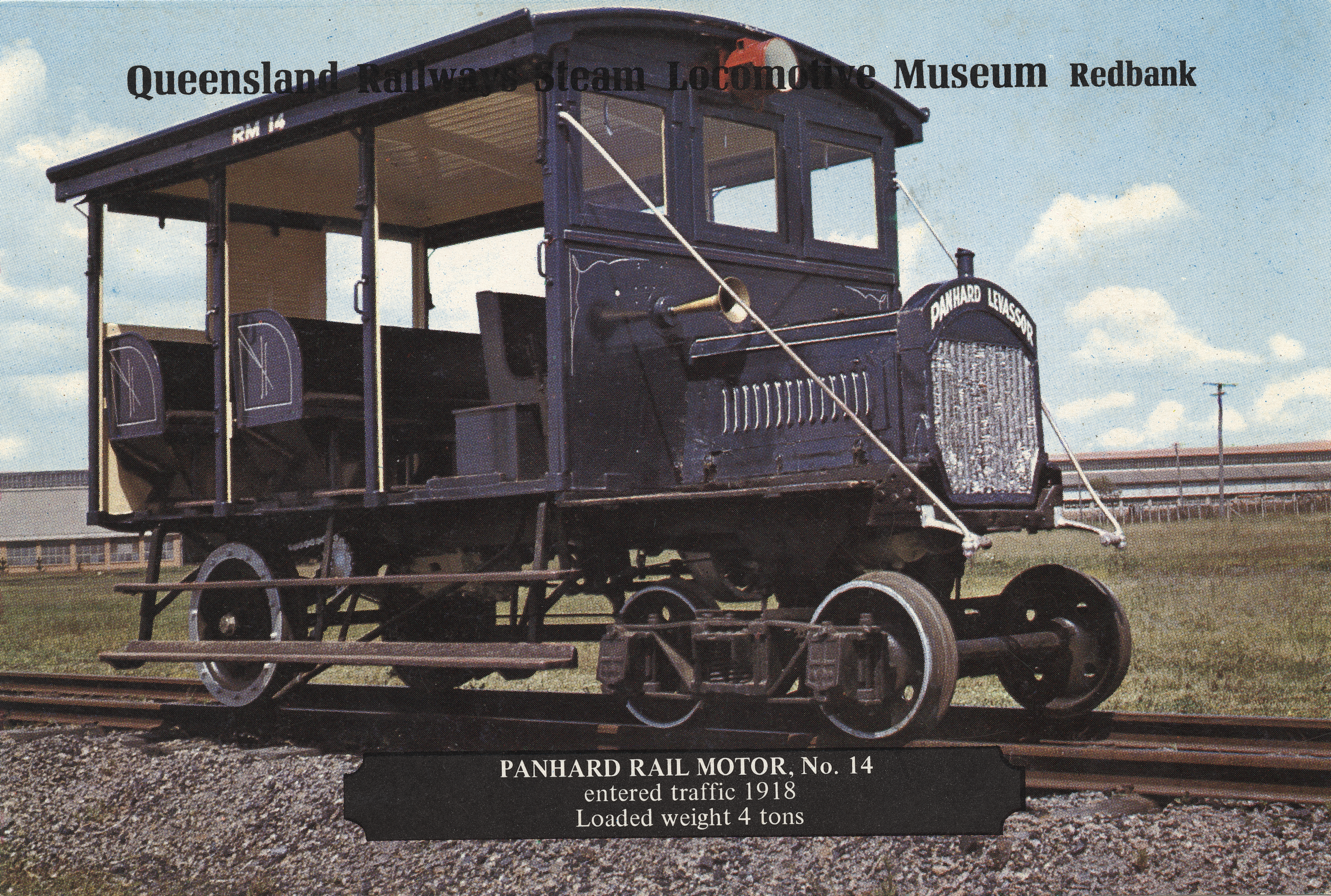
Panhard Levassor rail motor no. 14 was used on the route from 1922 to 1941

The goldfield at Croydon did not sustain its initial success. By the early 1900s its output had dropped considerably and after World War I when widespread mining diminished, it was obvious that the field would not recover. Traffic on the line was never high and steadily declined, although its value as a community service and a vital link during the wet season kept the line open. This was because the Phillips system worked well and the track could be put back into use almost immediately after flooding, whereas roads stayed impassable for much longer. Fortunately, the track took less maintenance than standard track because in the early 1920s the number of services and staff were considerably reduced. In the 1930s, all weather roads made the railway less important, but until the late 1960s the rail remained a vital transport link in the area. The terminus now functions largely as a tourist attraction. One railmotor was restored and named the "Gulflander" in 1978.

Although the line initially used steam locomotives, supplying enough suitable water for them locomotives was a problem from the beginning on this line and trains eventually carried water trucks. Railmotors were also more economical to run, so in 1922 the first railmotor, a Panhard, was tried on this route. In 1929 steam locomotives were discontinued and railmotors only were used. Diesel locomotives supplemented these in the 1980s.

Some of the working buildings at the terminus deteriorated and were removed including the workshops, carpenters and blacksmiths, though the sites can be still plainly seen.

== Description ==
The buildings at Normanton railway station are located at the edge of the town on a very level site which makes the buildings stand out sharply against the skyline. The surviving buildings comprise the station building with its attached carriage shade, the goods shed, water tank, vertical boiler and some relatively modern buildings such as the Officer in Charge's house at the Landsborough Street crossing.

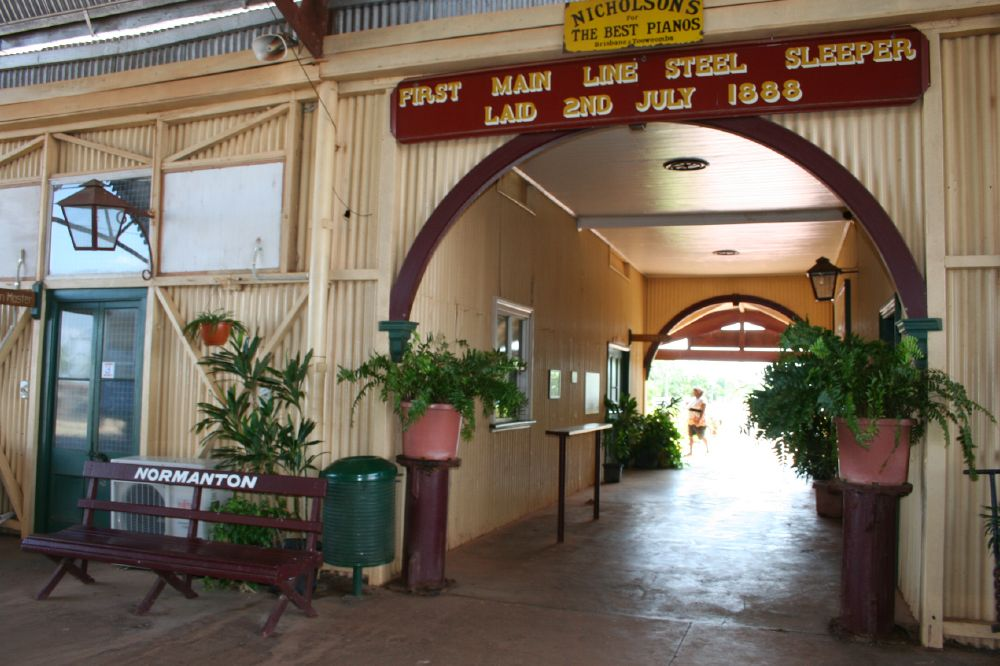
Entrance to the railway station, 2010

The station building is rectangular in plan with offices on either side of a central arched passage and is constructed of corrugated iron and timber on a slab laid on the ground. The timber wall frame is exposed and has cross braced studs which have been used to decorative effect. It has timber framed sash windows and is lined on the inside with vertical corrugated iron sheeting. The hipped roof is also clad with this material. A verandah with a curved corrugated iron roof stretches along the sides and street elevation where a small gable in the verandah roof marks the entrance. The rooms are now used as museum, store, shop, tea room and a room for the officer in charge. The ceilings are timber lined and retain early colour schemes. Some original furniture remains.

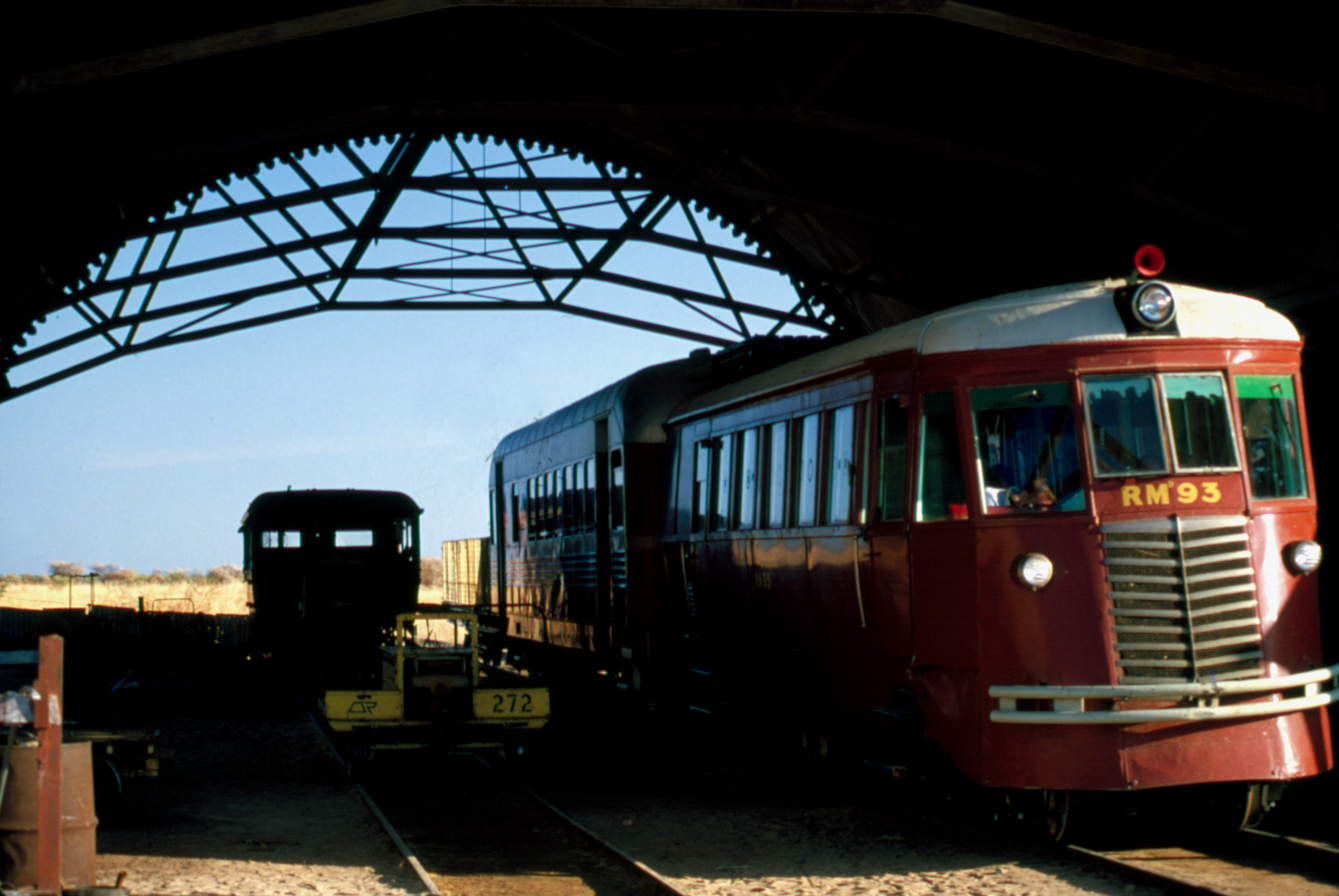
Historic Gulflander train in the locomotive shed, 1984

From the platform side of the building arches a huge steel framed carriage shade supported with decorated cast iron columns made by the Toowoomba Foundry that supplied some of the steel sleepers. It extends over three tracks and has a continuous ridge vent. The bow string trusses are exposed at each end of the arcade and a scalloped sheet metal fringe edges the curved roof at each end of the structure.

The goods shed faces the station across further lines and is also of corrugated iron, although far more utilitarian in design. Even so, its simple lines and arched entrances complement the more ornate nature of that building. It has an internal loading platform. The outside loading platform has a 5-ton Ransomes and Rapier of London crane dating from about 1902.

The water tank is located near the site of the engine shed and is a single tier tank on a cast iron stand manufactured by Haslam and Co Ltd, of Derby. The site of the workshops consist of the footings, base walls, slabs and inspection pits. A vertical boiler by A. Overend & Co survives at the southern end of the fitting shop area. Also scattered through the yards are the remains of several locomotives, tenders and section of line and sleepers.

== Heritage listing ==
Normanton railway station was listed on the Queensland Heritage Register on 21 October 1992 having satisfied the following criteria.

The place is important in demonstrating the evolution or pattern of Queensland's history.

The railway station at Normanton, as an important part of the Normanton to Croydon railway line, demonstrates the pattern of development in Queensland in which the railways linked ports with inland resources, particularly mineral fields. The terminus was intended eventually to serve lines to Cloncurry and other centres, so that its scale reflects the prosperity of the area at the time and its prospective importance.

The place demonstrates rare, uncommon or endangered aspects of Queensland's cultural heritage.

It is a substantially intact and distinctive terminal station for an isolated inland railway system, retaining a carriage shade attached to the station building which shields the platform and tracks, plus a goods shed with its original crane.

The place is important in demonstrating the principal characteristics of a particular class of cultural places.

The Normanton railway station is a well executed and interesting example of late nineteenth century railway architecture in Queensland. In a flat and open landscape, the scale, form and skilful use of vernacular materials make the terminus a striking and important component of the townscape of Normanton.

The place is important because of its aesthetic significance.

The Normanton railway station is a well executed and interesting example of late nineteenth century railway architecture in Queensland. In a flat and open landscape, the scale, form and skilful use of vernacular materials make the terminus a striking and important component of the townscape of Normanton.

The place is important in demonstrating a high degree of creative or technical achievement at a particular period.

The railway itself, with its use of low level submersible track and Phillips patented steel sleepers, was an important technical innovation which has proved remarkably durable. The terminus buildings designed by Phillips also show an imaginative and practical use of materials in this difficult location.

The place has a special association with the life or work of a particular person, group or organisation of importance in Queensland's history.

The terminus has strong associations with the life and work of George Phillips, who helped to explore and survey the area, served for several years as its Parliamentary representative and designed and supervised the building of the railway. It is also associated with James Gartside who prepared the designs for the terminus buildings under Phillips' direction.
