= Golden Gate Mining and Town Complex =

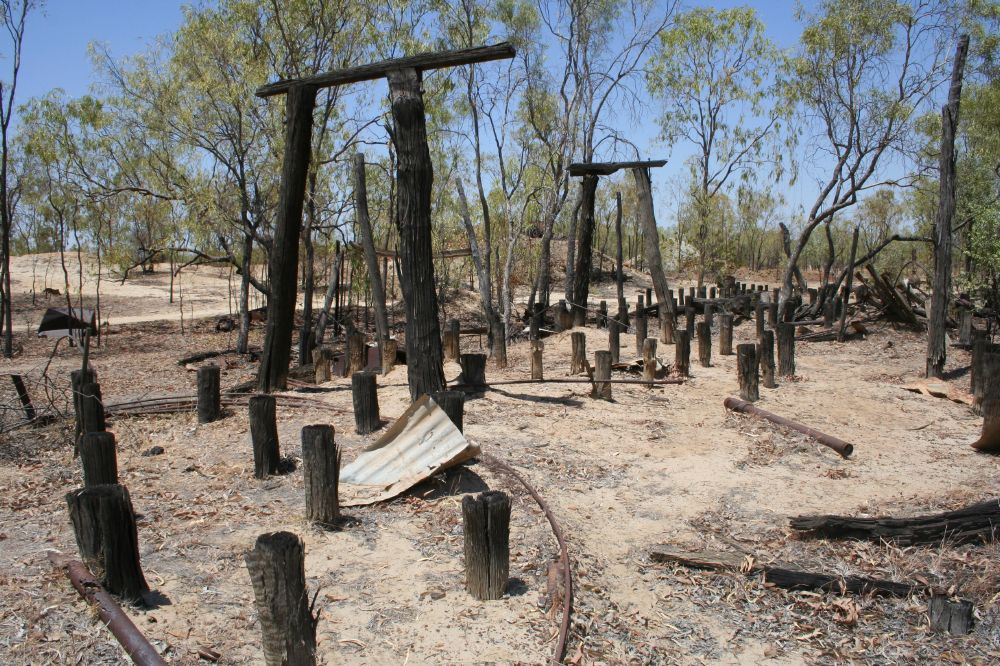
- Timber stump mounts for vat at Croydon Consols Cyanide Plant, 2005

- Location within Queensland Location within Australia
- 18.1569°S 142.2004°E
- Location: Normanton Road (Gulf Developmental Road), Croydon, Shire of Croydon, Queensland, Australia

History
- Design period: 1870s–1890s (late 19th century)
- Built: 1886

Queensland Heritage Register
- Official name: Golden Gate Mining and Town Complex, Golden Gate Township, Croydon Consols Pump Shaft, Golden Gate No.10 North Mine, Golden Gate Cemetery, Croydon Consols Battery and Cyanide Plant, Golden Gate Mine
- Type: archaeological (landscape)
- Designated: 14 August 2009
- Reference no.: 700005
- Significant period: 1891–1922

Golden Gate Mining and Town Complex is a heritage-listed mining camp at Normanton Road (Gulf Developmental Road), Croydon, Shire of Croydon, Queensland, Australia. It commenced in 1886. It is also known as Golden Gate Township, Croydon Consols Pump Shaft, Golden Gate No.10 North Mine, Golden Gate Cemetery, Croydon Consols Battery and Cyanide Plant, and Golden Gate Mine. It was added to the Queensland Heritage Register on 14 August 2009.

== History ==
The Golden Gate reef on the Croydon Goldfield, northwest of the town of Croydon, was first worked in 1886 but abandoned in 1887. Work recommenced in 1891 with production continuing until a decline in 1915. The Golden Gate proved to be the most productive reef on the field, attracting commercial interest and capital in mines such as Golden Gate No.1, Croydon Consols (which distributed £20,000 in dividends in 1896), No. 7 North, Nos. 3 and 4 South (which distributed over £72,000 in dividends in 1900), and No. 5 South. The township was surveyed in 1893, although buildings were established before this. The population of the township declined until it was deserted in 1922.

=== Croydon Goldfield ===
The earliest gold finds in the Croydon district were made by pastoralist William Brown and two of his station hands, who discovered a reef in mid-1883. Additional finds soon followed, mostly around the developing township of Croydon. On 18 January 1886 the area was declared the Croydon Goldfield and by the end of the year the population had grown to approximately 2,000. During 1887 the field boomed, the population trebling to around 6,000. At this period, gold yields from the Croydon field were second only to those recorded from Charters Towers.

Some mines close to Croydon township failed around 1890 when the ore was found to be cut by a wall of granite. However, rich discoveries in 1891 at the Golden Gate reef to the northwest compensated for this. The 1890s proved to be the most productive years for the Croydon Goldfield, despite increasing competition from emerging mining enterprises in South Africa and Western Australia. Most mining companies on the field were local concerns and Croydon brokers established a local stock exchange in 1892. The bank crash of 1893 was a setback for local capital and economic activity on the field waned temporarily.

The township of Croydon, which emerged as the social, administrative and commercial centre of the field, was declared a municipality in 1892, under the control of the Croydon Divisional Board. In 1907, administration passed to the Croydon Shire Council. From the mid-1880s satellite communities were established at many of the outlying reefs, with townships being formed at Golden Gate, Tabletop, Gorge Creek, Golden Valley, Goldstone, Carron and Twelve Mile, and campsites at Homeward Bound, Croydon King, Mark Twain, Lower Twelve Mile, Mulligan's, Flanagan's, Morning Light, Moonstone and Alluvial Springs.

=== Golden Gate reef ===
The first claim on the reef, the Golden Gate PC, was taken up by Joseph Hardy and James Fulton in April 1886. However, yields from the Golden Gate claims were meagre until 1891, when a rich ore chute was discovered in Rogers' No. 1 Golden Gate mine. The large, well defined, north/northwest bearing Golden Gate reef contained gold- bearing quartz with abundant sulphides and was mined over a total length of 2.5 kilometres (1.6 mi). Records suggest that payable ore was limited to a vertical depth of approximately 90 metres (300 ft). Its most productive years, between 1886 and 1911, showed a yield of 483,000 ounces (13,700,000 g) of gold from 244,364 long tons (248,285 t) of ore. This production totalled more than one-third of the entire Croydon yield.

Important reefs in the area included the Golden Gate, Nancy Lee, Banner of Freedom and Winning Post. Mines in the area included Golden Gate Nos. 5, 7 and 10, Golden Gate United, Golden Gate Consols, Tracey's Block, Morgan's Block, Roger's No.1 and Plant's Block.

In 1900 the Golden Gate was still producing prodigious amounts of gold, but despite this, the profitability of the Croydon Goldfield was in decline. Despite extensive efforts to secure new payable lodes, it was the lack of success of deep exploration that spelled the end of mining at Croydon. Gold production declined during the years leading up to World War I and by 1915 most mining activities had ceased.

=== Rogers' No. 1 Golden Gate ===
Rogers' No. 1 Golden Gate mine was one of the three major mines on this line along with the Golden Gate Consols and Golden Gate Nos. 3 and 4 South. James Rogers, an Irishman who came to Croydon in 1889 from Charters Towers owned and developed several mines on the Golden Gate reef and was also mayor of Croydon. The largest shareholder on the Golden Gate, Rogers obtained a government subsidy for deep sinking in 1894, which paid off with a rich find at 120 feet (37 m) in 1896, with 3,800 ounces (110,000 g) of gold obtained. The reef had been traced to a width of ten feet in 1897 and produced 12,560 ounces (356,000 g) of gold that year from 8,393 long tons (8,528 t) of quartz. This provided an excellent advertisement for selling the Golden Gate No. 1 on the English market. An English company completed the purchase and Rogers received one fifth of the shares. The company intended to spend £25,000 on machinery and development and on changeover in 1899 they immediately proceeded with a further deep sinking project.

Further development work was required to enable the mine to be worked systematically and the Rogers' Golden Gate produced 3,295 long tons (3,348 t) of quartz yielding 3,947 ounces (111,900 g) of gold in 1900. The mine was worked with two steam engines of eight and ten horsepower, two sets of double winding gear, one steam pump, and one whip, valued at £850. In 1902 additional plant was erected including three steam engines with a total of 51 horsepower, one single and two sets of double winding gear. The straight shaft was done to 510 feet (160 m) and the underlie of the extended shaft down to 531 feet (162 m). The mine kept 15 head of stamps at the Golden Gate mill constantly employed. The mine was partly tributed in 1904 with the tributers doing well. In 1906 Rogers' Golden Gate was the Golden Gate line's largest producer - 2,000 long tons (2,000 t) for 10,527 ounces (298,400 g) by the tributers.

=== No. 3 and 4 South Golden Gate Mine and Mill Site ===
This mine was one of the most successful on the field and went to a depth of approximately 400 feet (120 m). In the two years after its establishment in 1898 they produced 9,673 long tons (9,828 t) of quartz for a yield of 36,296 ounces (1,029,000 g) of gold valued at £96,927. The mine was known as Cashman's and the private syndicate of owners was preparing in 1900 to work the mine towards the Golden Gate United reef end on an extensive scale. The ore from the mine was crushed at the Enterprise mill and in March 1900 James Davis had purchased the whole of the tailings of Golden Gate No. 3 and 4 South to be cyanided at the new Station Creek cyanide treatment works. Frederick William Cuthbert, a well known Croydon mining agent, purchased the No. 3 and 4 Golden Gate South and profited handsomely in 1902.

The mine produced a total of 31,960 long tons (32,470 t) of quartz yielding 91,917 ounces (2,605,800 g) of gold bullion valued at £238,984, the largest of any of the Golden Gate mines. Gold production quickly dwindled at the mine after 1905, down to 292 ounces (8,300 g) in 1908.

=== Golden Gate Consols Mine ===
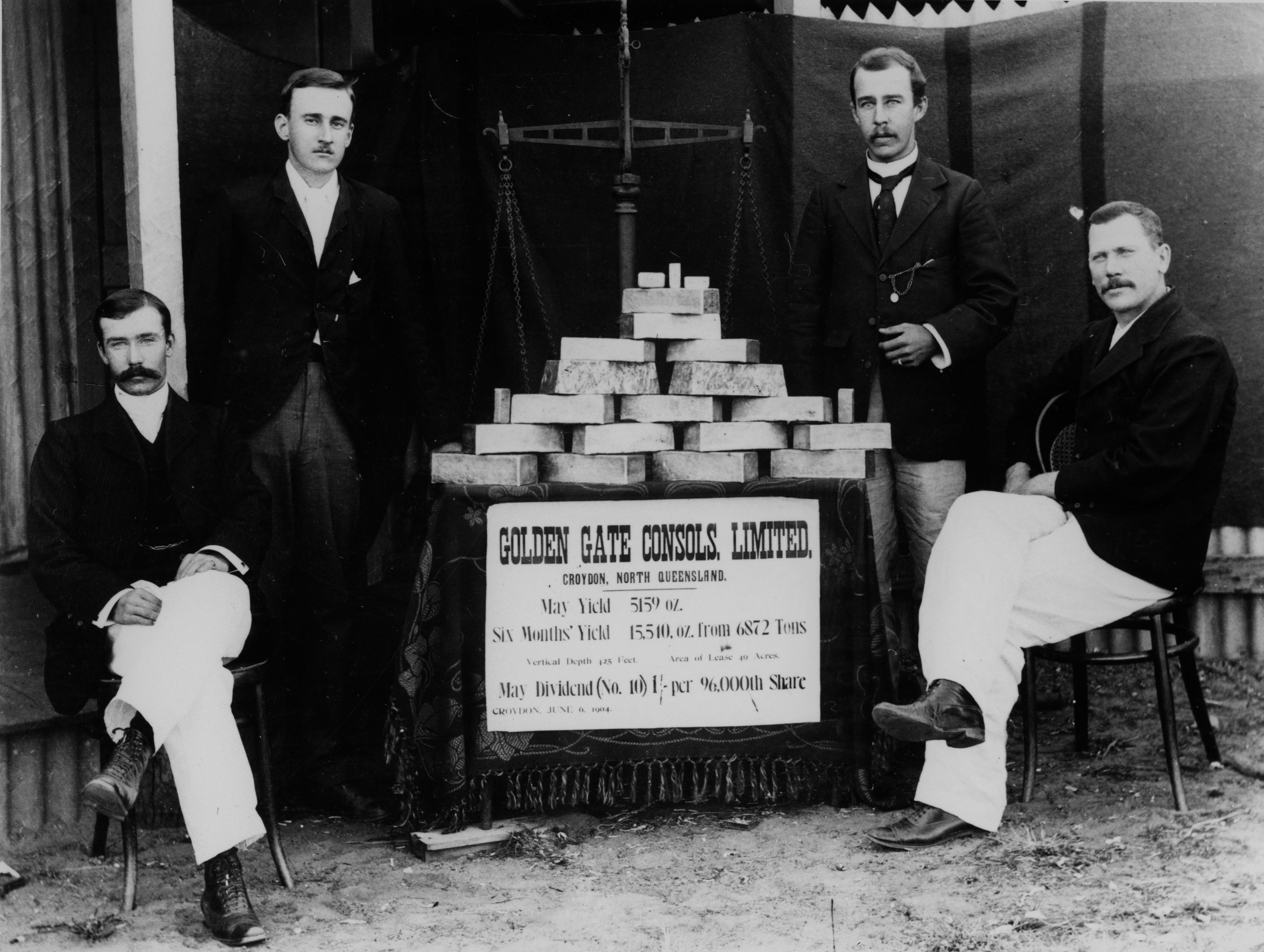
Gold yields from Golden Gate Consols, 1904

This mine was known initially as Golden Gate No.8 North and is located at the western end of the Golden Gate complex, between Rogers Gully and Golden Gate Creek. A 4-foot-6-inch (1.37 m) reef, located at 86 feet (26 m) in 1893, produced 363 ounces (10,300 g) of gold that year.

In 1894 the mine was sold to an English company, Croydon Consols Limited (nominal capital of £100,000 in 400,000 shares), for £16,000, to be paid in instalments. The new company managed the mine well, straightening and timbering the shaft, erecting a headframe and introducing steel buckets in place of greenhide. In 1896 the main shaft was sunk to 380 feet (120 m), making Golden Gate Consols the deepest mine on the field. In that year the mine produced 22,815 ounces (646,800 g) of gold, which enabled the company to declare a dividend of £28,000 - in excess of profits obtained from any mine on the Croydon goldfield to that date. The following year the company undertook further sinking and produced 11,390 ounces (323,000 g) of gold from 2,871 long tons (2,917 t) of quartz.

In September 1900 a rich leader was discovered, which sent shares up to a shilling. A new underlie shaft sunk in 1900 was equipped with winding plant (engine and boiler) made locally by Messrs Stuart and McKenzie of the Union Foundry, Croydon. During the next decade this mine was one of the leading producers on the Croydon Goldfield, yielding 81,629 ounces (2,314,100 g) from 32,877 long tons (33,405 t) of stone (an average of 2.48 ounces (70 g) per ton) or 19% of the total gold produced from Croydon field quartz crushing in the period.

=== Croydon Consols Battery and Cyanide Plant ===
Ore from the Golden Gate line of reefs was crushed initially at the Enterprise battery on Station (now Belmore) Creek. Owned by the Golden Gate Milling Company, the Croydon Consols battery (also known as Richardson's mill) comprised one 18 horsepower steam engine, 15 stamps weight nine hundredweight, six Berdan or Wheeler pans, and one pump and was valued at £3,000 in 1900. The mill was effectively double in size the next year with one 32 horsepower steam engine, 30 stamps weighing ten hundredweight, 12 Berdan and Wheeler pans, three Whifley concentrators, and four pumps valued at £6,000. The following year another steam engine was obtained and a dam was constructed bringing the value to £7,000. The mill's production declined rapidly after 1906, however it was still employing 16 hands in 1913 and had five or six others employed obtaining lime from Sweers Island in the Gulf of Carpentaria.

Cyanidation of tailings commenced on the Croydon Goldfield in 1894. The Croydon Consols cyaniding plant operated between 1897 and 1904, during which period 9,500 long tons (9,700 t) of tailings were treated for a yield of 7,000 ounces (200,000 g) of gold bullion. In 1897 the plant comprised one 12 hp steam engine, ten vats each of 50 long tons (51 t) each, two sumps each of 50 long tons (51 t), two solution vats each of 50 long tons (51 t), four recovery boxes and six pumps, the whole valued at £3,000. It was reduced in 1901 to a 6 hp steam engine, four 40 long tons (41 t) vats, two sumps each 3,960 imperial gallons (18,000 L; 4,760 US gal), one solution vat of 4,000-imperial-gallon (18,000 L; 4,800 US gal) capacity, two recovery boxes and a pump, valued at £1,500.

=== Croydon Consols Pump Shaft ===
Continued exploitation of the Croydon reefs required deep exploration, which proved difficult: as the mines became deeper and were interconnected for ventilation or prospecting, water in one would mean water problems in all. This difficulty was partially solved in 1898 by the construction of a large pump at the Croydon Consol mine.

Following a huge and costly inundation of the Golden Gate Consols mine in 1898, then the deepest mine on the field, the owners let a contract for £3,000 to Walkers Limited of Maryborough for pumping equipment. The plant was installed by Emslie Limited of Croydon in the first six weeks of 1899 and commenced operation in February that year. In 1901 the plant incorporated both single and double winding gear, three steam engines of 54 hp, six pumps, an air compressor and a rock drill, valued at £7,000. It was by far the most valuable pumping equipment on the goldfield and technically the most up-to-date. The pump also delivered water to the Golden Gate Milling Company mill in 1900. The pumping equipment remained in use until the closure of the mine in 1911.

=== Golden Gate No.10 North Mine ===
It is not known when the Golden Gate No.10 mine on the northern edge of the Golden Gate reef commenced operations, but it is marked on Rands' 1896 map. At the northern end of the line of reef, at varying distances from Golden Gate Creek, a number of prospecting shafts were sunk to try and find a continuation of the reef, which had proved so productive further south. No.10 North was at the northern end of the field and here the reef became well defined, although there was a convergence of faults. Mining operations were conducted on a large scale in exploring the reef up to 1906.

In 1923 there is again record of the Golden Gate No.10 North mine being worked. By August that year Messrs. Hayman and Ah Foo, supported by a strong local syndicate, had de-watered the mine and were sinking a monkey shaft in the No. 2 North level in the hope of picking up the reef.

In 1923 Golden Gate No. 10 North was the only mine working in the Croydon district, but efforts to locate the continuation of the reef past the fault were disappointing. A shoot at the 34-metre (112 ft) level yielded 55 ounces (1,600 g) of gold from a crushing of 16 long tons (16 t). There are no further records after this time.

=== Morgan's Shaft ===
H.F Morgan, an old speculator of the field, formed the local Golden Gate United Block and 98 block Gold Mining Company Limited in 1899 on striking the reef at Golden Gate No. 4 and 5 South Block. The shaft, commenced in 1899, continued to be sunk through 1900, before striking water and having to constantly bail in 1901. A powerful pump was installed. In 1902 the shaft cut the Golden Gate reef at 480 feet (150 m) and they sunk an underlie for 142 feet (43 m); however the reef was not payable and the straight shaft was the outlet for the water. Surrounding mines contributed to the sinking and bailing as their mines would eventually be flooded otherwise.

The 98 Block Gold Mining Company Limited registered as the Golden Gate Amalgamated Blocks Limited in 1904 and used the Morgan's Shaft to test the deep ground in Golden Gate Consols mine and Golden Gate Gold mines. However water continued to be an issue. The shaft continued to serve the Golden Gate No. 8 and No. 10 lines up until 1914 when despite two shifts a day bailing water from the shaft, the flow could not be contained.

=== Township of Golden Gate ===
The township of Golden Gate, approximately 8 kilometres (5.0 mi) northwest of Croydon, was surveyed by W. A. Irwin in April 1893, comparatively late in the history of the field, although there were buildings constructed well before this. Along with other "satellite" communities established at outlying reefs, Golden Gate developed around the main administrative and commercial centre of Croydon. Members of the outlying communities would visit Croydon on Saturday nights to shop, conduct their business and socialise. The Chinese community of Croydon provided essential support to the surrounding communities through their market gardens. Mines serviced by Golden Gate included Golden Gate Nos 1 to 10, Golden Gate United, Golden Gate Consols, Tracey's Block, Morgan's Block, Rogers No. 1, and Plants Block, the deepest mine on the Croydon goldfield.

A railway station was opened at Golden Gate when the Normanton to Croydon railway commenced operation in 1891, and was relocated over a mile to the west in 1892. By 1894 the small township boasted a population of 250, which had risen to 600 by 1900, supporting 11 hotels, one billiards saloon, over a dozen stores, a blacksmith, three churches, three butchers and several carters, carriers and coach proprietors. A school operated from 1896 to 1921, and a post office from 1891 to 1919. Production declined during the years leading up to World War I, and the population of the township similarly declined, particularly after the closure of Forsythe's Pioneer Mill in 1922.

=== Golden Gate Cemetery ===
Golden Gate Cemetery is one of at least ten cemeteries which served the Croydon area after it was declared a goldfield in 1886. It is situated adjacent to the Golden Gate Township on the western side of the Normanton to Croydon railway. It does not appear to have been gazetted and was probably in use from the establishment of mining settlement in the mid-1880s until the new cemetery at Station Creek was surveyed in 1899 and gazetted in 1900. The heritage-listed Station Creek Cemetery, surveyed in 1899, was known initially as the Golden Gate Cemetery. Located midway between the Golden Gate group of mines and the Sunset group of mines, it appears to have served both communities.

== Description ==
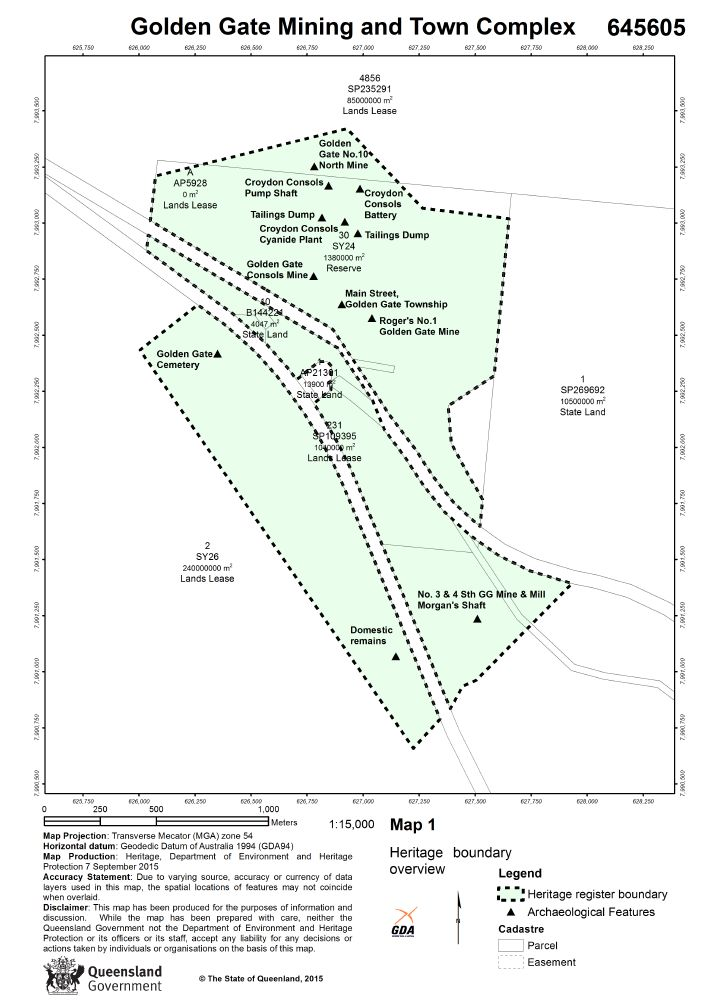
Boundary map, 2015

The Golden Gate Mining and Town Complex is located approximately 8 kilometres (5.0 mi) northwest of Croydon, adjacent to the heritage-listed Normanton- Croydon railway line and the Gulf Developmental Road. The site includes remnants of the Rogers' No. 1 Mine, No. 3 and 4 South Golden Gate Mine and Mill, Morgan's Shaft, Golden Gate Consols Mine, Croydon Consols Battery and Cyanide Plant, Croydon Consols Pump Shaft, Golden Gate No.10 North Mine, Golden Gate Township, and Golden Gate Cemetery.

=== Rogers' No. 1 Golden Gate Mine ===
The mine is located in the vicinity of the Gulf Developmental Road approximately 500 metres (1,600 ft) to the south of the Golden Gate Consols Mine. A brick flue, Cornish boiler and winding engine foundations were recorded as remaining on site in 1992.

=== No. 3 and 4 South Golden Gate Mine and Mill, and Morgan's Shaft ===
Located towards the south end of the complex, this site retains a boiler, engine remains, boiler and mill foundations, winding engine, tanks, shaft and mullock heaps.

=== Golden Gate Consols Mine ===
This mine is located about 200 metres (660 ft) north of the Gulf Developmental Road, on the east side of Golden Gate Creek, and over 500 metres (1,600 ft) southwest of the Croydon Consols Battery and Cyanide Plant. The place comprises a shaft, mullock dump, retaining walls, winding plant, boilers, chimney base and ship's tanks.

=== Croydon Consols Battery and Cyanide Plant ===
The main component groups are a battery site and a cyanide plant. The battery site includes boilers, concrete and stone mounts and foundations, and steam engines. An earth formation for a tramway runs southward from the battery, past an earth reservoir site, to two small tailings dumps. The cyanide plant is centred 150 metres (490 ft) south of the battery, with a recent tailings dump extending some distance to its west and covering the site of most of the former Golden Gate Township. Sections of a chain of tailings buckets (not in situ) are located at the battery end of the cyanide plant. The surviving remnants include tailings bucket chains, a boiler, an engine, timber stump foundations and concrete ponds.

=== Croydon Consols Pump Shaft ===
The Croydon Consuls Pump Shaft is located about 150 metres (490 ft) north-west of the Croydon Consols cyanide plant, between the western end of the tailings dump and the eastern bank of Golden Gate Creek. The place contains a high mullock dump, which extends on the west to the bank of the creek. The site includes remains of a shaft, pump arm, concrete and log mounts, engine parts, a winding unit and a boiler.

=== Golden Gate No. 10 North Mine ===
This mine is located on the western bank of Golden Gate Creek about 150 metres (490 ft) north of the Croydon Consols pump shaft and about 200 metres (660 ft) west of the Croydon Consols battery site. The remains include the mine shaft, steam engines, winding unit and boilers.

=== Golden Gate Township ===
The centre of the township is on the northern side of the railway. Parts of this are now destroyed by the Gulf Developmental Road and farm tracks. The central tailings dump associated with the mines along the Golden Gate reef, also now covers much of the former Golden Gate Township. Evidence of township habitation is located at the southern end of the Golden Gate Consols mine site. No extant structures survive but the remains of dwellings are found throughout the re-growth savannah woodland. These include earth floors, some stone footings, vertical sections of corrugated iron walls (possibly 'rat walls') set into the ground, and associated scatters of broken bottle glass, bricks, stove remains, sheet iron, tins and domestic ceramics. There are also some minor surface workings in and around the township site. There are further signs of habitation on the southern side of railway, connecting with the Golden Gate Cemetery.

=== Golden Gate Cemetery ===
The Golden Gate Cemetery is located to the southwest of the railway and the former Golden Gate township, approximately 230 metres (750 ft) west of the Gulf Developmental Road. There are believed to be 19 graves in the cemetery. Only two graves have iron railings and two have sandstone surrounds. One of the graves with a metal railing has been subject to an exhumation. A further eight possible graves have been identified from soil disturbance and concentration of rocks.

=== Other Domestic Remains ===
Archaeological evidence of domestic habitation occurs outside the township area. Examples occur at the southern end of the listing boundary on the west side of the railway line where there is a large scatter of domestic artefacts including glass bottles, bricks, ceramics and metal items. There is also some structural evidence consisting of stone and concrete which may be steps.

== Heritage listing ==
Golden Gate Mining and Town Complex was listed on the Queensland Heritage Register on 14 August 2009 having satisfied the following criteria.

The Golden Gate Mining and Town Complex, which contains remnants of mine workings, battery, cyanide plant, township and cemetery, has the potential to provide information on important aspects of Queensland's history, especially early gold mining practices and treatment processes, and patterns of settlement in North Queensland. The Golden Gate Reef was the most productive on the Croydon goldfield and the complex demonstrates the pattern and development of gold mining on this important field.

The complex features extensive archaeological evidence relating to a wide range of gold mining and processing activities. The place contains the largest surviving assemblage of early boiler and steam engine power plant recorded in North Queensland. The cyanide plant is amongst the earliest and most intact recorded in North Queensland and the tailings bucket chain and stumps and supports for the vats are now rare remains. The site contains a very rare undertype semi-portable steam engine and winching unit and a 4.5-metre (15 ft) high vertical boiler which is the largest of this type recorded in North Queensland. The pump shaft contains the only surviving beam pump arm recorded in the Georgetown-Croydon district.

Artefactual material has been identified in the former town site and surrounding areas in surface and subsurface deposits. This material includes domestic refuse such as glass bottles, bricks, domestic ceramics, stove remains, tins and sheet iron. Due to the extensive size of the identifiable archaeological materials a high degree of archaeological integrity remains. The cemetery at Golden Gate retains substantial physical evidence including iron railings, sandstone surrounds and soil disturbance.

The mine workings, battery, and cyanide plant at Golden Gate provides a rare opportunity to examine, through archaeological remains, a wide range of gold mining and processing activities and technologies. The spatial organisation and layout of the complex's extensive archaeological evidence including shafts, machinery and other physical remains has the potential to reveal information about early gold mining operations and provide an understanding of the continuity and change in gold mining practices. Archaeological investigation of the Golden Gate Mining and Town Complex also provides for comparative and complementary research into other gold mining operations on the Croydon goldfield, including Enterprise Battery, Content Mine and the Homeward Bound Battery and Dam.

Archaeological investigations at the Golden Gate Mining and Town Complex have potential to answer important research questions about the community's establishment, development, interaction, trade and decline. The archaeological evidence will provide information on the spatial organisation and pattern of the site, and of the interrelationships between mining, residential and commercial activities. The use of a cultural landscape approach to the archaeological investigation of Golden Gate will enable the examination of the network of satellite communities and their association with Croydon as the social and administrative centre. Physical and social connections can be investigated archaeologically through an examination of roadways, railways, domestic material culture and industrial technology. An understanding of the collective experiences of such communities may be gained through further research into the site, particularly given the level of intra-site complexity.

Archaeological research into the cemetery at Golden Gate has the potential to provide information on social aspects of the isolated community. Analysis of the types and styles of burials and grave markers, and the layout and organisation of the cemetery, have the potential to reveal information on such research questions as ethnicity, religion and social division within the community. Archaeological analysis of the remains of those buried in the cemetery also has the potential to reveal details of the health and living conditions of the residents of the township. Such research provides for comparative and complementary investigations at other cemeteries related to mining communities, including nearby Station Creek Cemetery.

The Golden Gate Mining and Town Complex provides the potential to examine social and ethnic groups not present or well represented in the historical record. Archaeological investigations have the potential to examine the presence and involvement of Chinese people in mining operations and in support economies through examination of domestic material culture and mining technologies. The presence and interaction of Aboriginal people with members of the Golden Gate community has the potential to be revealed in the archaeological evidence. Archaeological examination of the ethnic groups within the mining community, such as Irish, Cornish or Scottish, also has the potential to increase understanding of the social dynamics of such groups in mining communities in Queensland.

Given the complexity of the Golden Gate Mining and Town Complex a wide range of additional archaeological research potential exists, including but not limited to examination of gender, labour relations and class.
