= Frederick Cuthbert =

Frederick Cuthbert may refer to:

- Frederick Cuthbert (cricketer) (1800–1821), English amateur cricketer
- Frederick Alexander Cuthbert (1902–1978), American landscape architect
- Frederick William Cuthbert (1850s–1948), grocer and miner in Croydon, Queensland, Australia
