= Station Creek Cemetery =

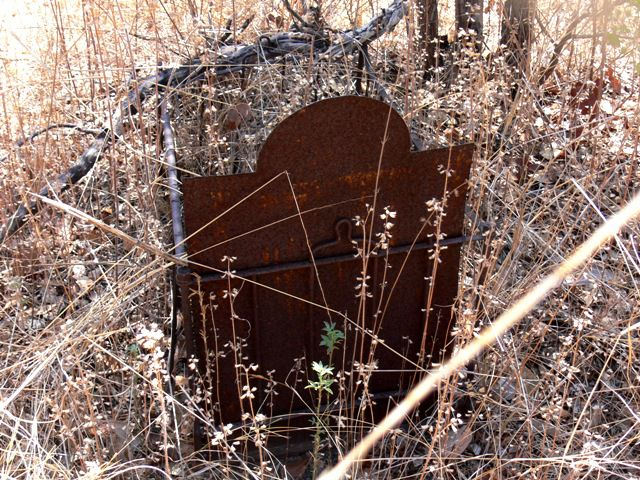
- Fenced grave at Station Creek Cemetery, 2009

- Location within Queensland Location within Australia
- 18.1624°S 142.2158°E
- Location: Normanton Road, Croydon, Shire of Croydon, Queensland, Australia

History
- Design period: 1870s–1890s (late 19th century)
- Built: c. 1899

Queensland Heritage Register
- Official name: Station Creek Cemetery, Golden Gate Cemetery
- Type: state heritage (built)
- Designated: 25 October 2002
- Reference no.: 602375
- Significant period: 1890s–1920s (fabric) c. 1899–1920s (historical use)
- Significant components: burial/grave, grave surrounds/railings, grave marker

Station Creek Cemetery is a heritage-listed cemetery at Normanton Road, Croydon, Shire of Croydon, Queensland, Australia. It was opened c. 1899. It is also known as Golden Gate Cemetery. It was added to the Queensland Heritage Register on 25 October 2002.

== History ==
Station Creek cemetery is one of at least 10 cemeteries which served the Croydon area after it was declared a goldfield in 1886, although it is no longer in use. It appears to have been gazetted as the Golden Gate cemetery in 1900 after a survey completed by Charles McGowan in 1899. It comprises 1 hectare (2.5 acres) of land, 2–3 kilometres (1.2–1.9 mi) south east of the Golden Gate town site, and east of the Croydon to Normanton railway line. However, this cemetery is commonly known as the Station Creek cemetery, while an earlier burial ground west of the Croydon to Normanton railway line, adjacent to the Golden Gate township, is commonly known as the Golden Gate cemetery. The Croydon goldfield was the last of the North Queensland gold rushes of the nineteenth century. After a peak in gold production in 1900, mining declined over the next two decades. There was a small revival during the 1930s Depression and again from 1988 to 1991 in the Tabletop and Golden Gate areas. The present population of the district is approximately 300, and only the main Croydon Cemetery is still in use.

Croydon is situated approximately 110 miles (180 km) west of Georgetown and 90 miles (140 km) south east of the port of Normanton on the Gulf of Carpentaria. This area was first explored by Europeans in the 1860s. John McKinlay searched for lost explorers Burke and Wills in 1862. James Graham MacDonald explored a route from Carpentaria Downs to the Gulf in 1864. H.E. Young investigated routes for an overland telegraph line between Cardwell and Normanton, which was built between 1869 and 1872, and later became a lifeline for the northern mining fields. Pastoralists followed these early explorers, bringing sheep in 1865, but by 1867 many had retreated because of fever, drought, low wool prices and distance from markets

Gold was first discovered on Croydon Downs Station which had been taken up by W.C. Brown in 1881. In the latter part of 1883, two of his employees James and Walter Alldridge found a leader of quartz carrying gold. However it was not until 1885 that Richard and Walter Alldridge, acting under instructions from W.C. Brown, prospected the area and discovered twenty payable reefs. The finds were reported in October 1885, and the Croydon area was proclaimed a goldfield on 18 January 1886, thus coming under administration of the Mines Department. W.C. Brown and the Alldridge brothers shared a £1000 reward for the discovery, and the reward claim, Lady Mary, was taken up by 6 partners including W.C. Brown and Richard Alldridge.

By 1887, total population of the district had peaked at 7000, and by 1897 it still had the third highest population in north Queensland after Charters Towers and Townsville. From 1890 to 1910, gold output from the Croydon reefs were second only to Charters Towers. Total production from inception until 1947 was 772,374 ounces. By 1909 however, production began to decline and by 1914, the population at the turn of the century had halved. There was a small revival around Tabletop and Golden Gate between 1988 and 1991.

Residents at Croydon goldfields faced many hardships from inadequate supplies of water, pasture grasses and timber for fuel and construction purposes. Isolation was also a major problem until the Croydon to Normanton railway was completed in 1891. The area was subject to droughts and floods, and even a cyclone in 1906. Industrial action in 1888 resulted in the formation of a branch of the Amalgamated Miners' Association, and a strike occurred in 1889 when mining companies again tried to lower wages. Some mines close to Croydon township failed around 1890 when the ore was cut by a wall of granite. However rich discoveries at Golden Gate to the north west compensated a little for this. A financial setback occurred in the "crash" of 1893, when most banks closed doors and gold buying ceased, throwing many miners out of work.

As on many other Queensland goldfields, Croydon had a Chinese community which developed on the north west fringe of the town. The community constructed a temple, houses and other facilities such as pig ovens. By the end of 1888 Mining Warden L.E.D. Towner reported that Croydon had a population of approximately 3500 of whom 300 were Chinese, Cingalese, Malays and African. It appears that a shifting population of around 300 Asians was maintained. This figure is surprising given that the Queensland Goldfields Amendment Act of 1878 excluded Chinese people from new fields for three years unless they had made the discovery. However it appears that their involvement at Croydon was primarily as gardeners, carriers and cooks. There was some racial tension at times. A race riot occurred in 1886 when a Chinese residence was pulled down. Also, in May 1888, William Hodgkinson, Minister for Mines, ejected all Chinese from the Croydon and Etheridge goldfields. However, they were soon allowed to return because their market gardens were essential to the well-being of the community.

Despite all difficulties, the 1890s were productive years for Croydon. Pugh's Almanac of 1900 listed 3 banks, 6 blacksmiths, 5 bakers, 6 commission agents, 4 newsagents, 6 carriers, 2 chemists, 6 drapers, 11 sharebrokers, 4 newsagents, 18 hotels and 4 watchmakers, among many other assorted businesses. Croydon became a municipality in 1892 under the control of the Croydon Divisional Board, and in 1907 administration was under the Croydon Shire Council.

The fields developed with Croydon as the main administrative and commercial centre surrounded by "satellite" communities established at outlying reefs. Members of the outlying communities would visit Croydon on Saturday nights to shop, conduct their business and socialise. There were townships at Golden Gate, Tabletop, Gorge Creek, Golden Valley, Goldstone, Carron, Twelve Mile, and campsites at Homeward Bound, Croydon King, Mark Twain, Lower Twelve Miles, Mulligan's, Flanagan's, Morning Light, Moonstone and Alluvial Springs. This resulted in the establishment of at least 10 cemeteries throughout the district.

The township of Golden Gate was surveyed in December 1892 by W.A. Irwin, although there were buildings constructed well before this. The survey was late in the history of the field considering that the first reward claim, Golden Gate PC, was taken up by Joseph Hardy and James Fulton on 12 April 1886. However, yields from the Golden Gate fields were meagre until 1891, when a rich ore chute was discovered in Roger's No. 1 mine. It went on to become the most productive field in the Croydon area. By 1900, Golden Gate had a population of 600, 11 hotels, 8 stores, 3 churches and 3 butchers. A school operated from 1896 to 1921, and a post office from 1891 to 1919. Production declined during the years leading up to World War I, and the township virtually disappeared after the closure of Forsythe's Pioneer Mill in 1922.

Station Creek cemetery appears to have been originally gazetted as the Golden Gate cemetery in 1900, after a survey completed by Charles McGowan in 1899. Another and earlier burial ground commonly known as the "Golden Gate Cemetery" lies west of the Croydon to Normanton railway line adjacent to the Golden Gate township. This earlier cemetery was never gazetted. It was possibly in use until gazettal of the later cemetery at Station Creek. Gordon Grimwade, who prepared a Conservation Plan for the Croydon cemeteries in January 2000, has recommended that this matter needs resolution by a "location and ident" survey.

It is not known why a new cemetery was gazetted for the area in a different location. However the new site is midway between the Golden Gate group of mines and the Sunset group of mines, so it was possibly moved to facilitate common use by both of these communities.

Mines in the Golden Gate group included Golden Gate Nos 1 to 10, Golden Gate United, Golden Gate Consols, Tracey's Block, Morgan's Block, Rogers no. 1, and Plants Block, the deepest mine on the Croydon goldfields. Mines in the Sunset group included True Blue, Content, Blue Peter, Sunset and Lady Isabelle.

== Description ==
Station Creek cemetery covers 1 hectare (2.5 acres) of land, 5 kilometres (3.1 mi) north west of Croydon on the north east side of the Normanton Road, and 2–3 kilometres (1.2–1.9 mi) south east of the Golden Gate town site. The site is just west of Belmore Creek.

There are two clearly marked graves, although evidence of a further 34 has been noted. One of the marked graves is that of a young girl, Charlotte Brown. This grave is marked by a metal railing with higher rails towards the head.

The cemetery is bounded by natural vegetation and a Department of Main Roads gravel stockpile on the eastern boundary. Access is from the Normanton Road about 100 metres (330 ft) west of the Belmore Creek bridge crossing. There is minor difficulty with access due to construction of the Belmore Creek bridge which has substantial side drains to the approaches. A roughly defined track crosses a drainage gully on the north side of the road. The track terminates near the corner of a post and wire fence which encloses the present cemetery boundary. The fence was recently constructed and may not reflect the original boundary. A single gate provides entry.

The terrain is gently sloping with fine grained, sandy soil. Vegetation is predominantly natural although introduced weed species have been noted. Eucalypts and other endemic tree species are scattered through the site. Tussocky native grasses provide a dense cover during most of the year. Native birds and animals utilise this habitat.

== Heritage listing ==
Station Creek Cemetery was listed on the Queensland Heritage Register on 25 October 2002 having satisfied the following criteria.

The place is important in demonstrating the evolution or pattern of Queensland's history.

The Station Creek Cemetery, first surveyed in 1899, reflects the early development of the region. The cemetery is an important record of the cultural development of the area, showing the ethnicity, occupations and social status of the inhabitants of early Croydon since settlement.

The place has potential to yield information that will contribute to an understanding of Queensland's history.

The cemetery has the potential to yield information in regards to the early history of the inhabitants of Croydon, their ethnic, social and religious backgrounds and standing within the community.

The place has a strong or special association with a particular community or cultural group for social, cultural or spiritual reasons.

The cemetery is significant for its high spiritual and symbolic value to the community because of the burials that took place there and the evidence of hardship experienced by the first inhabitants of Croydon.
