= Content Mine =

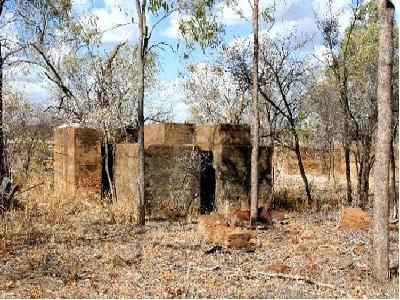
- Remains of compressor mounts at the former Content Mine

- Location within Queensland Location within Australia
- 18.1718°S 142.2201°E
- Location: Gulf Developmental Road, Croydon, Shire of Croydon, Queensland, Australia

History
- Design period: 1870s–1890s (late 19th century)
- Built: 1887–1918

Queensland Heritage Register
- Official name: Content Mine, Content Block Mine
- Type: state heritage (archaeological)
- Designated: 4 July 2006
- Reference no.: 602243
- Significant period: 1887–1918 (fabric, and historical operation of mine)
- Significant components: machinery/plant/equipment – mining/mineral processing, mounting block/stand, shaft, tank – water

Content Mine is a heritage-listed former mine at Gulf Developmental Road, Croydon, Shire of Croydon, Queensland, Australia. It was built from 1887 to 1918. It is also known as Content Block Mine. It was added to the Queensland Heritage Register on 4 July 2006.

== History ==
Located on the Croydon Goldfield, the Content PC was opened in 1887 by Croydon businessman and mining investor Frederick William Cuthbert as part of the True Blue and Isabella complex of mines at Croydon and it operated until the end of World War I. Production and profitability of the Croydon Goldfield declined from 1900, the field being largely abandoned by 1915.

Croydon is situated in the heart of the Gulf Savannah, 562 kilometres (349 mi) west of Cairns, approximately 176 kilometres (109 mi) west of Georgetown and 144 kilometres (89 mi) south east of the port of Normanton on the Gulf of Carpentaria. Europeans first explored this area in the 1860s. John McKinlay searched for lost explorers Burke and Wills in 1862 and John Graham MacDonald explored a route from Carpentaria Downs to the Gulf in 1864. Pastoralists followed these early explorers, bringing sheep in 1865, but by 1867 many had retreated because of fever, drought, low wool prices and distance from the markets. An overland telegraph line was constructed from Cardwell to Normanton between 1869 and 1872. This passed through the Croydon district and later became a lifeline for the northern mining fields.

Gold was first discovered on Croydon Downs Station, which had been taken up by W. Brown in 1881. In the latter part of 1883, two of his employees found quartz carrying gold. However it was not until 1885 that Richard and Walter Alldridge, acting under instructions from WC Brown, prospected the area and discovered 20 payable reefs. The finds were reported in October 1885, and the Croydon area was proclaimed a goldfield on 18 January 1886, thus coming under the administration of the Queensland Department of Public Works and Mines.

Hundreds flocked to the area. By 1887 the population of the district had peaked at 7000, and by 1897 it still had the third highest population in north Queensland after Charters Towers and Townsville. From 1890 to 1910, gold output from the Croydon reefs were second only to Charters Towers. Total production from inception until 1947 was 772,374 ounces (21,896,400 g). By 1909 however, production began to decline and by 1914, the population at the turn of the century had halved.

Residents on the Croydon Goldfield faced many hardships including inadequate supplies of water; pasture grasses and timber for fuel and constructions purposes. Isolation was also a major problem until the Croydon to Normanton railway was completed in 1891. The area was subject to droughts and floods, and even a cyclone in 1906. During the "crash" of 1893, when most banks closed doors and gold buying ceased, many miners were thrown out of work. Despite all these difficulties, the 1890s were productive years for Croydon. Pugh's Almanac of 1900 listed 3 banks, 6 blacksmiths, 5 bakers, 6 commission agents, 4 newsagents, 6 carriers, 2 chemists, 6 drapers, 11 share brokers, 18 hotels and 4 watchmakers, among many other assorted businesses. Other townships were established at Golden Gate, Tabletop, Gorge Creek, Golden Valley, Goldstone, Carron, Twelve Miles, Mulligan's, Flannigan's, Morning Light, Moonstone and Alluvial Springs.

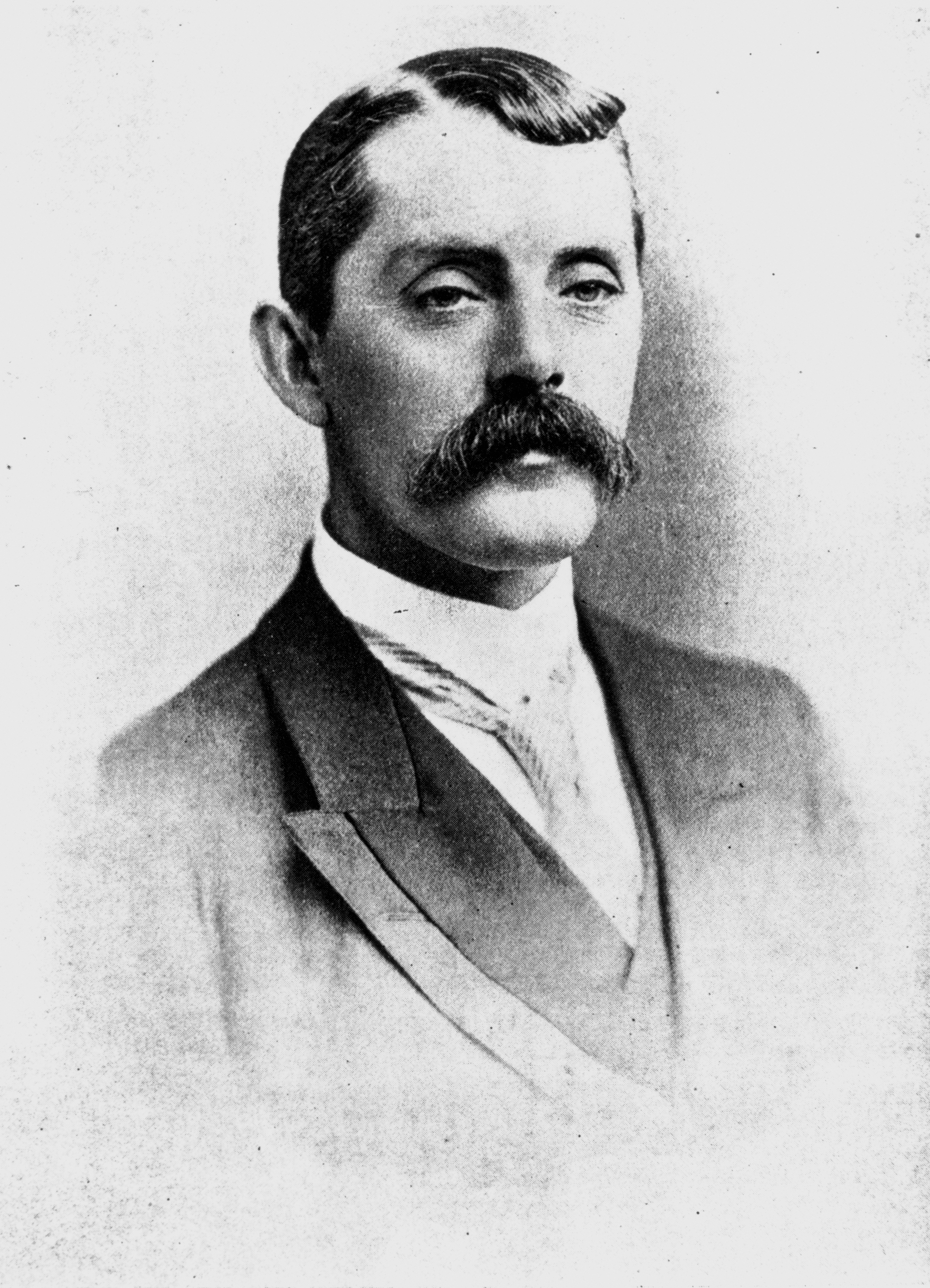
Frederick William Cuthbert, owner of the Content Mine

The Content Mine was established in 1887 by FW Cuthbert, a Croydon grocer, mining investor and mining director. The mine remained under Cuthbert's proprietorship throughout its life; public companies never invested in it. Cuthbert was the last of Croydon's influential mining men. He was known for his openness to new ideas such using the diamond drill to test his geological theories. His use of rock drilling machinery to make large, low-grade ore bodies pay through economies of scale was unusual in north Queensland. His personal qualities and business enterprises were important for the success of mining activities on the Croydon Goldfield.

In its first year of operation the Content mine produced 30 long tons (30 t) of quartz yielding 27 ounces (770 g) of gold. The first equipment installed at the mine was a 12-horsepower steam engine imported in 1891 at a value of £500.

In 1892, during a widespread economic depression, the Isabella and the Content were employing 150 men, but in that year the Content only produced 206 ounces (5,800 g) of gold. Along with the True Blue and Isabella the Content had pumping machinery and these were known as the premier mines on the field in 1893.

For the rest of the decade the Content produced an ounce of gold per ton of stone crushed. The most profitable years were 1894 with 897, 1895 with 344 ounces (9,800 g), and 1896 with 256 ounces (7,300 g). Production was sparse until 1900 and 1901 when 288 and 511 ounces (14,500 g) were produced. By constantly pumping, Cuthbert produced profits and expanded operations. One history of the Croydon Goldfield acknowledged the success of Cuthbert's Content Mine:

This big low-grade reef was patiently developed over a decade, paying the occasional profit or breaking even. Cuthbert stayed with it, working it on an increasing scale; he even introduced rock drills in 1912. After 1905 it became the field's biggest producer of ore, if not of gold. It supported around 25-30 miners in a period of chronic depression on the field. However it had to crush at customs mills a couple of miles away and its output of 2-3000 tons a year was hardly impressive. Low grade ore needed to be worked on a larger scale to be consistently profitable over a long period, and cheap milling was essential. Often the Content made a profit simply because it hit a patch of richer stone. However it did show how working more of the low-grade reefs might have prolonged the field's life.

In September 1900, Cuthbert applied for a new lease of the Content (which included the Content Block mine) and commenced sinking a shaft striking the reef at 85 metres (279 ft). He then spent over £10,000 on equipment and development work before he received any returns. If the Content had been owned by a company it would have been abandoned, but Cuthbert believed in its potential and was ultimately rewarded.

Substantial poppet legs and a winding engine were erected in 1903 on the frontage line and the two shafts were being worked together. They produced 1,252 ounces (35,500 g) of gold from 1,306 long tons (1,327 t) of stone. The mine produced well in 1904 and 1905 yielding 5,571 ounces (157,900 g) at under £2 per ounce from 2,206 long tons (2,241 t) of stone and 3,253 ounces (92,200 g) respectively. However, like every Croydon mine, 1906 was a disappointing year for the Content. Heavy development work was underway. £4,418 was made in profit from 2,246 ounces (63,700 g) in 1907. By 1908 it was the most productive mine on the Croydon field producing 2,770 long tons (2,810 t) of stone yielding 7,203 ounces (204,200 g) of gold valued at £10,625. It held its own through 1909 with a profit of £6,091 from 3,465 ounces (98,200 g) of gold.

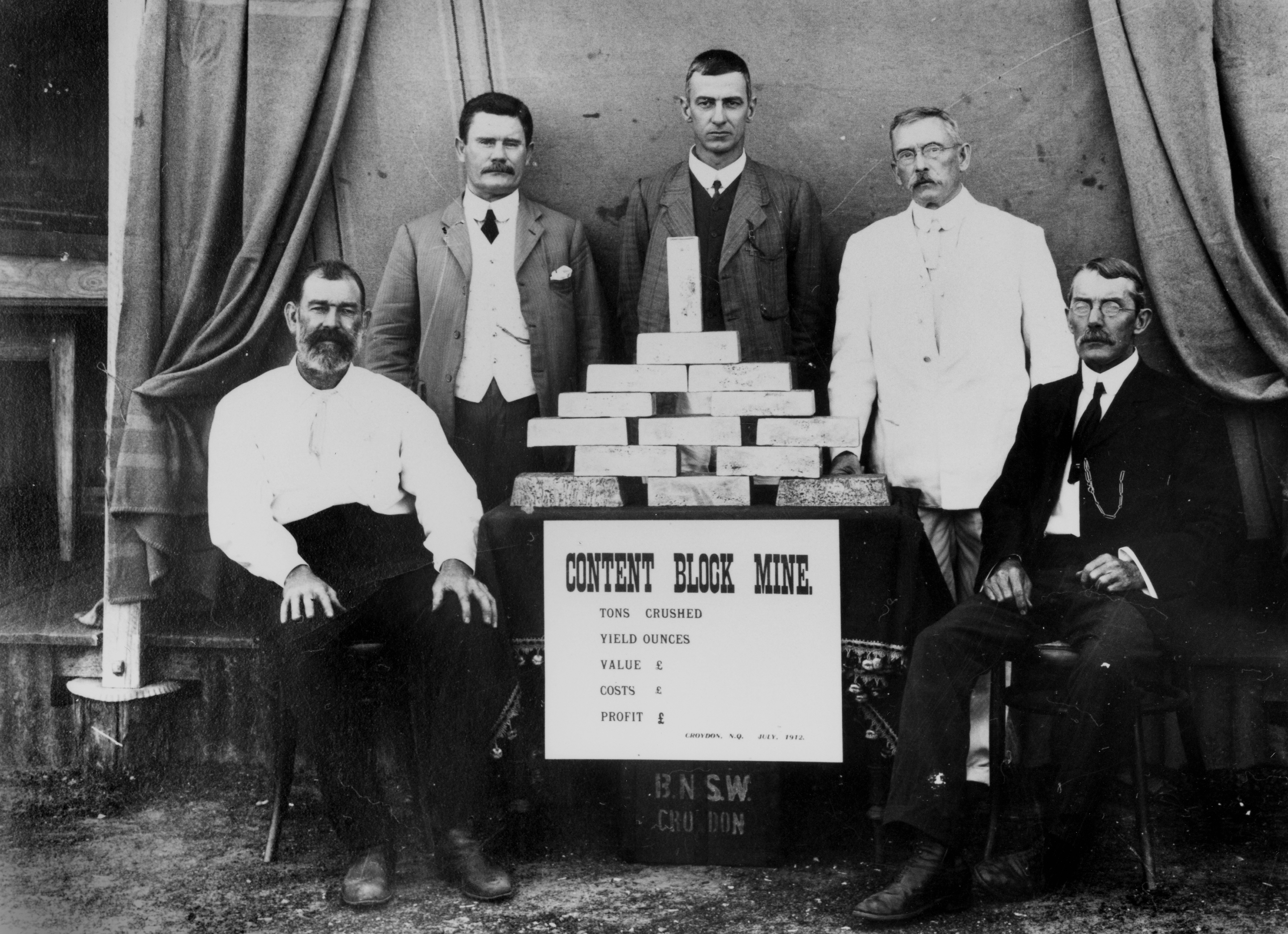
Gold ingots from the Content Mine, 1912

Extensive development work was done in 1910 to follow the reef and it was the highest producer on the field with 3,031 ounces (85,900 g) from 2,707 long tons (2,750 t) of stone. By 1912 the Content was producing one third of the total gold production on the Croydon Goldfield. It also employed the largest number of miners of any mine on the field - 32. An air compressor was purchased from Charters Towers in 1912 together with a 40HP Babcock boiler from the Federation mine for a total of £3,000.

In 1912 the Queensland Mines Department stated that Cuthbert's foresight in developing the Content mine showed that capital, judiciously expended, would give good returns on the Croydon Goldfield because undoubtedly there were other lines of reef which would probably give the same results if worked on the same scale and method.

The Content was earning Cuthbert, as owner, a considerable income up to 1912. From then on water was a problem and the faces of the stopes were unpromising. Cuthbert sought to re-open Waram's shaft in 1914, which had been discontinued 20 years before. Production was all inferior stone and eventually Cuthbert gave up the struggle, closing the mine on 24 January 1918 after a continuous run of over 16 years. The final crushing was of 231 long tons (235 t) of stone, which yielded 1,058 ounces (30,000 g) of gold valued at £1,843. The Content was the last of the large productive mines on the Croydon field.

Officially, the Content reef yielded 65,130 ounces (1,846,000 g) of gold from 35,521 long tons (36,091 t) of ore between 1886 and 1918 and most of this derived from Cuthbert's Content Block mine. However, the bullion gold yield is quite deceiving: from the 60,235 ounces (1,707,600 g) of bullion gold, only 23,822 ounces (675,300 g) of fine gold was derived and the balance was almost all silver.

The plant was removed c. 1918 and transferred to the Iguana Consols to prospect for the lost Iguana reef. The layout of the plant there mirrors the arrangement at the Content.

== Description ==
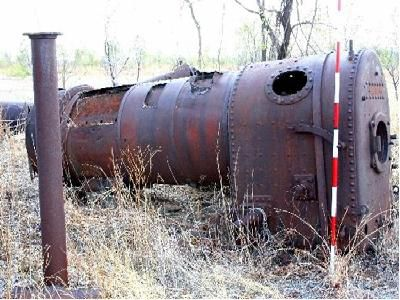
Remains of the portable steam engine

The Content Mine is located 4 kilometres (2.5 mi) northwest of Croydon on the southern side of the Gulf Developmental Road. The area around the mine has been heavily disturbed in recent times by road construction and modern mining activities. While most of the vegetation has been cleared, to the north and east of the site there is a sparse coverage of trees, predominantly Eucalyptus spp regrowth.

The main concentration of machinery and concrete foundations are located to the northwest of the site, about 40–60 metres (130–200 ft) southwest of the current Gulf Developmental Road. However, there are a number of shafts, most of which have filled with water, and one which is timbered with sawn hardwood, situated on the southern side of the former Gulf Developmental Road. The use of sawn timber to line the shaft is rare on the former Croydon goldfield; most timbered shafts in the area used locally cut sapling logs. Surviving sawn timber shaft linings are rare in Queensland.

The southeast corner of the site has been truncated as a result of the construction of a large open cut pit during 1980s mining activities, which has since filled with water.

The site has been much disturbed in recent times and stone boiler mounts, concrete compressor footings and a portable steam engine are the only evidence of Cuthbert's capital investment in the mine. The presence of the iron pump balance may be indicative of water problems in the mine, although there is no evidence of a pump bed at the collar of the surviving shaft.

Most of the plant has been removed from the place and the area, which is located immediately alongside the Gulf Developmental Road, has been subjected to considerable disturbance. All evidence of mullock heaps has been removed from the site. The two compartment timbered main shaft has partly caved at the surface. A group of concrete and bed log machinery mounts are aligned with the shaft including foundations for a winding engine and an air compressor. A twin cylinder portable steam engine and the remains of a stone mount for a Cornish boiler are similarly aligned. A section of a lightweight iron pump balance is located on the place. An above ground concrete tank contains evidence of cooling tower footings.

The surviving plant includes:

- Two cylinder portable steam engine – no brand
- Iron pump balance

== Heritage listing ==
Content Mine was listed on the Queensland Heritage Register on 4 July 2006 having satisfied the following criteria.

The place is important in demonstrating the evolution or pattern of Queensland's history.

The Content Mine at Croydon, developed under the proprietorship of mining entrepreneur FW Cuthbert, is significant in Queensland history as the longest operating mine (1887–1918) on the important Croydon Goldfield. In addition, Cuthbert's willingness to trial, and then use, the latest mining technologies (such as new drilling machinery), allowed mining activities of large, low-grade ore bodies to be shown to be profitable.

The place demonstrates rare, uncommon or endangered aspects of Queensland's cultural heritage.

This demonstrates an unusual pattern for Queensland gold mines, making poorer ore payable by mining and treating it along with richer ore, instead of just extracting the richer ore. Even on Charters Towers Goldfield, only a handful of mines achieved this level of development. The timbered shaft at the southern end of the Content Reef (south of the former Gulf Developmental Road alignment) is very rare, being early (late 19th century) and lined with sawn timber boards. It is important in demonstrating its type and early gold mining techniques that are no longer practised.

The place is important in demonstrating the principal characteristics of a particular class of cultural places.

Surviving fabric associated with early mining activity at this site includes the foundations of the winding engine, compressor and compressor cooling tower, which indicate the scale of operations at the Content Mine.

The place has a special association with the life or work of a particular person, group or organisation of importance in Queensland's history.

The Content Mine has a special association with the life and work of FW Cuthbert, a Queensland (and later New Guinea) mining entrepreneur who played a significant role in the success and history of the Croydon Goldfield.
