= Frederick William Cuthbert =

Australian grocer and miner

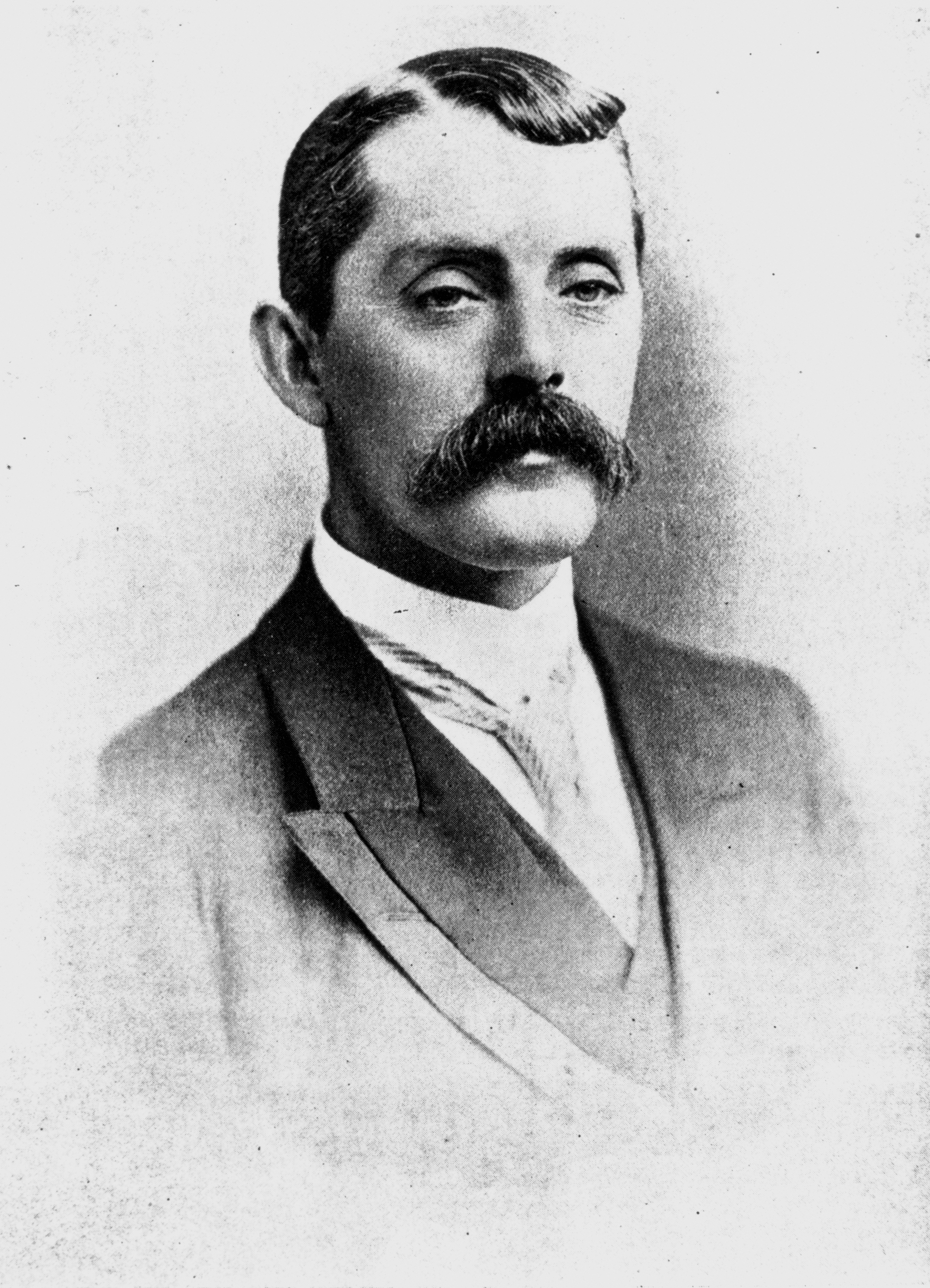
Frederick William Cuthbert, Croydon

Frederick William Cuthbert (died 5 October 1948) was a grocer and miner in Croydon, Queensland, Australia. He was known as the "Gold King of the North".

== Early life ==
Born about 1855, Cuthbert was the son of a London policeman.

== Grocer and miner ==
Cuthbert arrived in Melbourne in 1876 with 3/6 in his pocket. He carried his swag from Melbourne to Glen Innes, New South Wales where he spent six years as a miner and storekeeper. While he was prospecting between Glen Innes and Grafton, he honed his skill at recognising gold-bearing country.

From Grafton, Cuthbert went to the goldfields of Gympie. From there, he was part of the first goldrush in Croydon in 1885–1886, but it was a "duffer" (short-lived). Having visited Thursday Island, he decided to return to Croydon, walking 450 miles from Cooktown to do so.

On his second visit, he struck gold on the Golden Gate reef, which produced £112,000 over 19 years. He established the Content Mine in 1887. The mine remained under Cuthbert's proprietorship throughout its life without resorting to public investment. Cuthbert was the last of Croydon's influential mining men. He was known for his openness to new ideas such using the diamond drill to test his geological theories. His use of rock drilling machinery to make large, low-grade ore bodies pay through economies of scale was unusual in north Queensland. His personal qualities and business enterprises were important for the success of mining activities on the Croydon Goldfield. In September 1900, Cuthbert applied for a new lease for the Content Mine and commenced sinking a shaft striking the reef at 85m. He then spent over £10,000 on equipment and development work before he received any returns, something most companies would not have been prepared to do. However, Cuthbert believed in the mine's potential and was ultimately rewarded.

Having sold his interests, eight years later Cuthbert met a friend on a Brisbane racecourse and was persuaded to invest in a mine at Misima Island in New Guinea. This was another success, and he sold out 8 1/2 years later for £75,000.

Although wealthy, Cuthbert was not able to sit idle. He returned to Croydon, but he was unable to proceed due to World War II. He then moved to Georgetown where he lived with old friends Jack Bethel and his wife.

== Death ==
On 25 October 1948, Cuthbert died aged 93 years at the home of his niece, Mrs J. Beyrer, at Wilston, Brisbane. He was cremated at the Mount Thompson crematorium on 27 October.
